= New Turkish Cinema =

2010 book by Asuman Suner

- I.B. Tauris book cover
- Author: Asuman Suner
- Language: English
- Genre: Turkish Cinema
- Publisher: I.B. Tauris
- Publication date: January 30, 2010
- Publication place: United Kingdom; United States
- Media type: Hardback; Paperback
- Pages: 224
- ISBN: 978-1-84511-949-2

New Turkish Cinema: Belonging, Identity and Memory is a 2010 I.B. Tauris publication by Istanbul Technical University Associate Professor Asuman Suner which examines the emergence of the new wave Turkish cinema, including both commercial and independent productions, against the backdrop of the drastic transformation undergone by Turkey since the mid-1990s and how these films persistently return to the themes of belonging, identity and memory. The book, which was published on January 30, 2010, is an extensively revised and re-written update of an earlier edition published by Metis Press, Istanbul, in 2006.

== Content ==
=== Introduction ===
The author briefly outlines the history of Turkish cinema in order to place the emergence of new Turkish cinema in into historical and cultural context.

=== Chapter 1: Popular Nostalgia Films ===
New popular Turkish films focusing on the provincial small-town life of the past, which voice a critique of modern Turkish society through an idealized representation of the past as a time of collective childhood, are discussed by the author, who finds this critique problematic, however, as it renders society unaccountable for the events of the past and alleviates it from the burden of responsibility.

==== Filmography ====
- Propaganda (1999), directed by Sinan Çetin
- Offside (Turkish: Dar Alanda Kısa Paslaşmalar, 2000), directed by Serdar Akar
- The Waterfall (Turkish: Şellale, 2001), directed by Semir Aslanyürek
- Vizontele (2001), directed by Yılmaz Erdoğan and Ömer Faruk Sorak
- Vizontele Tuuba (2004), directed by Yılmaz Erdoğan
- My Father and My Son (Turkish: Babam ve Oğlum, 2005), directed by Çağan Irmak
- The International (Turkish: Beynelmilel, 2006), directed by Muharrem Gülmez and Sırrı Süreyya Önder

=== Chapter 2: New Political Films ===
The new wave of Turkish political films, which show the effect on normal people of the country's traumatic recent past (including police brutality, disappearances, repression of religious and ethnic minorities and the Kurdish–Turkish conflict), are discussed by the author, who argues these films interrogate questions of national identity and belonging in common with transnational cinema.

==== Filmography ====
- Journey to the Sun (Turkish: Güneşe Yolculuk, 1999), directed by Yeşim Ustaoğlu
- In Nowhere Land (Turkish: Hiçbiryerde, 2002), directed by Tayfun Pirselimoğlu
- Mud (Turkish: Çamur, 2003), directed by Derviş Zaim
- Waiting for the Clouds (Turkish: Bulutları Beklerken, 2003), directed by Yeşim Ustaoğlu
- Toss-Up (Turkish: Yazı Tura, 2004), directed by Uğur Yücel

=== Chapter 3: The Cinema of Nuri Bilge Ceylan ===
The films of the Cannes Grand Jury Prize-winning auteur-filmmaker Nuri Bilge Ceylan, arguably the most internationally acclaimed director of new Turkish cinema, are discussed by the author, who claims that they are mainly about acknowledging the paradoxes of home and belonging.

==== Filmography ====
- Cocoon (Turkish: Koza, 1995), directed by Nuri Bilge Ceylan
- Small Town (Turkish: Kasaba, 1998), directed by Nuri Bilge Ceylan
- Clouds of May (Turkish: Mayıs Sıkıntısı, 2000), directed by Nuri Bilge Ceylan
- Distant (Turkish: Uzak, 2002), directed by Nuri Bilge Ceylan
- Climates (Turkish: İklimler, 2006), directed by Nuri Bilge Ceylan

=== Chapter 4: The Cinema of Zeki Demirkubuz ===
The films of prominent auteur-filmmaker Zeki Demirkubuz, which centre on characters who are agitated or detached, draw upon highly-dramatic and violent events, and use compulsive repetition in the narrative, are discussed by the author, who claims they direct attention to the dark underside of domesticity and the home.

==== Filmography ====
- Block C (Turkish: C Blok, 1994), directed by Zeki Demirkubuz
- Innocence (Turkish: Masumiyet, 1997), directed by Zeki Demirkubuz
- The Third Page (Turkish: Üçüncü Sayfa, 1999), directed by Zeki Demirkubuz
- Fate (Turkish: Yazgı, 2001), directed by Zeki Demirkubuz
- Confession (Turkish: İtiraf, 2002), directed by Zeki Demirkubuz
- The Waiting Room (Turkish: Bekleme Odası, 2003), directed by Zeki Demirkubuz
- Destiny (Turkish: Kader, 2005), directed by Zeki Demirkubuz

=== Chapter 5: New Istanbul Films ===
The new transitional genre of Istanbul Films, which offer alternative ways of seeing the city to its former privileged position in Turkish cinema, is discussed by the author, who claims that these films recycle and reuse traditional clichés about the city rather than negating them.

==== Filmography ====
- Somersault in a Coffin (Turkish: Tabutta Rövasata, 1996), directed by Dervis Zaim
- Istanbul Tales (Turkish: Anlat İstanbul, 2005), directed by Selim Demirdelen, Kudret Sabancı, Ümit Ünal, Yücel Yolcu and Ömür Atay
- Head-On (German: Gegen die Wand / Turkish: Duvara Karşı, 2004), directed by Fatih Akın
- Crossing the Bridge: The Sound of Istanbul (Turkish: İstanbul Hatırası: Köprüyü Geçmek, 2005), directed by Fatih Akın

=== Chapter 6: The Absent Women of New Turkish Cinema ===
The absence of women, a major defining characteristic of new Turkish cinema, is discussed by the author, who suggests this is shaped by an ambivalence of the filmmakers who subordinate women to men and deny them agency but have a critical self-awareness of their complicity with patriarchal society.

==== Filmography ====
- Vasfiye is Her Name (Turkish: Adı Vasfiye, 1985), directed by Atıf Yılmaz

=== Afterword ===
The author provides a general assessment of new Turkish cinema on the basis of the arguments in the preceding chapters.
