= Winter Sleep (film) =

2014 Turkish film by Nuri Bilge Ceylan

- Film poster
- Turkish: Kış Uykusu
- Directed by: Nuri Bilge Ceylan
- Written by: Nuri Bilge Ceylan; Ebru Ceylan
- Produced by: Zeynep Özbatur Atakan
- Starring: Haluk Bilginer; Demet Akbağ; Melisa Sözen; Tamer Levent; Nejat İşler
- Cinematography: Gökhan Tiryaki
- Edited by: Nuri Bilge Ceylan; Bora Göksingöl
- Production companies: NBC Film; Bredok Filmproduction; Memento Films Production; Zeynofilm
- Distributed by: Pinema
- Release dates: 16 May 2014 (Cannes); 13 June 2014 (Turkey)
- Running time: 196 minutes
- Countries: Turkey; France; Germany
- Languages: Turkish; English
- Box office: $3.7 million

Winter Sleep (Turkish: Kış Uykusu [ˈkɯʃ ujkuˈsu]) is a 2014 Turkish drama film directed by Nuri Bilge Ceylan, adapted from the novella "The Wife" by Anton Chekhov and one subplot of The Brothers Karamazov by Fyodor Dostoevsky. The story is set in Anatolia and examines the significant divide between the rich and the poor as well as the powerful and the powerless in Turkey. It stars Haluk Bilginer, Demet Akbağ and Melisa Sözen.

Ceylan had long wished to adapt "The Wife", and shot it in Cappadocia. At the 2014 Cannes Film Festival, the film won the Palme d'Or and the FIPRESCI Prize. The film was selected as the Turkish entry for the Best Foreign Language Film at the 87th Academy Awards, but was not nominated.

== Plot ==
Aydın, a former actor, owns a mountaintop hotel in Cappadocia, as well as several properties which he rents out to local tenants. He leads a more idyllic life than most people around him in the region. Educated and wealthy, he spends his time writing columns for a local newspaper and researching the history of Turkish theater, of which he hopes to write a book someday.

One day, Aydın and his assistant Hidayet are driving down to the village when a stone shatters the window. It was thrown by İlyas, the son of İsmail, one of Aydın's tenants who is several months behind in the rent. When Hidayet confronts the father, it turns out that Aydın's people had already sent a collection agency that took İsmail's television and refrigerator, with İsmail getting beaten up by the police for resisting. The situation escalates until İsmail's brother Hamdi intervenes.

Hamdi, the eager-to-please local imam, brings the young İlyas to Aydın in an attempt to make amends for the glass-breaking incident. However, this only serves to annoy Aydin, inspiring him to write a column on how an imam should really give a proper example to their community. At first, his sister Necla wonders why Aydın does not use his writing talent in a better place than the local newspaper. Later, she reverses her view and tells him that he is just superficially and sentimentally criticising other people from his comfortable armchair. This results in a long chain of snide remarks made back and forth at each other. This reversal occurs after Necla mentions to Aydın's wife Nihal that Necla might be better off going back to her ex-husband, after which Nihal tells Necla that she is free to leave even though it is a stupid idea.

Nihal is much younger than her husband Aydın. She tries to give meaning to her life by fundraising for developing schools, an activity for which Aydın has not shown much interest. However, when Nihal organizes a fundraiser event in their home, Aydın becomes annoyed and tells her that the fundraiser event will be a guaranteed failure due to her lack of experience and bookkeeping skills. This turns into an emotional argument, where he tells her that she is free to divorce from him if she wishes so. Finally, Aydın states that he will leave for Istanbul for several months to make arrangements for his book. He warns her that she should not trust Levent (Nadir Sarıbacak), one of the other people involved in the fundraiser, since Aydın considers Levent to lack moral values. Before he leaves, Aydın makes a large anonymous donation in cash.

The next day, Hidayet takes Aydın to the train station, carrying all the luggage while Aydın comfortably walks empty-handed. Due to heavy snow fall, the train is severely delayed, and Aydın decides that they will visit Aydın's friend Suavi in a nearby village. Suavi welcomes Aydın's visit, but Levent also shows up, as Levent and Suavi had agreed earlier to go out hunting. They spend the evening drinking and talking. There is some tension between Aydın and Levent, as Levent makes insinuations that Aydın did not do enough to help in the aftermath of an earthquake, six years earlier.

In the meantime, Nihal visits the house of Hamdi, İsmail, İlyas, and the sick grandmother. Nihal learns that İsmail was unemployed after a prison sentence for stabbing a lingerie thief and that İlyas had been suffering from pneumonia. Their financial difficulties are due to the fact that Hamdi has to take care of all of them from his modest income as an imam. Nihal offers the money that Aydın had donated, around 10,000 lira ($5,900 in 2013), enough to buy a house in the area. İsmail is insulted by what he sees as an attempt to pay off her conscience and burns the money in the fireplace, to the horror of Nihal.

Aydın returns home the next day. As Nihal stares out of the window, silently, Aydin's voice is heard explaining to Nihal that even if she doesn't love him anymore, she can't live without him and Aydın asks for her forgiveness. Aydin starts his procrastinated project of writing about the history of Turkish theatre as heavy snow falls to Cappadocia.

== Cast ==
- Haluk Bilginer as Aydın, a former actor who is now a writer, hotel owner, and landlord.
- Demet Akbağ as Necla, Aydın's recently divorced sister who started to detest the monotonous living in Cappadocia and thus, wants to return her alcoholic ex-husband.
- Melisa Sözen as Nihal, Aydın's young wife. She sinks under her husband's experience, knowledge, and personality. Tries to assert herself with the aid campaigns she runs.
- Ayberk Pekcan as Hidayet, Aydın's assistant.
- Tamer Levent as Suavi, Nihal and Aydın's friend. Since his wife has just died and his daughter is studying in London, he lives alone in a remote village. However, he does not want to leave this house where he spent his childhood.
- Nejat İşler as İsmail, Aydın's tenant. His fresh release from prison deteriorated his reputation, making it impossible for him to find a job. For this reason, he has difficulty in paying his rent and tries to suppress his stress by consuming alcohol.
- Serhat Kılıç as Hamdi, the local imam and İsmail's brother. The sole breadwinner of this house of five people. Hopelessly tussles to feed his family and pay the rent by keeping on the right side of Aydın.
- Nadir Sarıbacak as Levent, a teacher and Nihal's friend. Wants to be a part of Nihals aid campaign but Aydın doesn't trust him much.
- Mehmet Ali Nuroğlu as Timur, one of the hotel guests. He is a young University student that loves adventure and prefers a spontaneous life.
- Emirhan Doruktutan as İlyas, İsmail's son. Rarely talks and often suppresses his feelings.

== Production ==
Director Nuri Bilge Ceylan co-wrote the screenplay with his wife Ebru Ceylan, based on "The Wife" by Anton Chekhov, wishing to make an adaptation for 15 years but not feeling ready. He said it was challenging to write, remarking "You struggle and there are moments you feel you will go nowhere. Some days after the struggle, there is a script, and you forget the process". Ebru, who often debated with him in their collaborations on screenplays opted to end their writing partnership after Winter Sleep.

Besides having Chekhov's "The Wife" as inspiration, the film uses a subplot of "The Brothers Karamazov" by Fyodor Dostoyevsky, specifically of Book Four: Lacerations. In the novel, Alyosha, one of the protagonists, observes a group of schoolboys throwing rocks at one of their sickly peers named Ilyusha, whom he tries to help. Ilyusha bites Alyosha's finger, mirroring İlyas throwing the rock at Aydın's car. In both, the film and the book, it is revealed that the boys' shame and anger about their respective fathers (Snegiryov in Dostoyevsky's novel, İsmail in Winter Sleep) being humiliated in times of hardships are the cause of their behavior. Snegiryov was assaulted by Dmitri, Alyosha's Brother, while İsmail's was beaten by the police for trying to resist the collection agency sent on Aydın's behalf. Just like Alyosha offering Snegiryov money as an apology for his brother's behavior and to help his family, Nihal tries to make up for her husband by bringing İsmail's family money. Again, Snegiryov throwing the money to the ground and stomping it into the mud mirrors İsmail burning the money in contempt.

The film was produced through the director's company NBC Film in collaboration with Turkey's Zeynofilm, Germany's Bredok Film Production and France's Memento Films. It received 450,000 euro from Eurimages. Filming took place during two winter months in Cappadocia followed by four weeks in Istanbul for studio scenes. The film was shot with the Sony F65 camera. The final adjustments to the story line took place when Ceylan edited it.

== Distribution ==
The film was distributed by Pinema in Turkey, New Wave Films in the United Kingdom, and Adopt Films in the United States.

== Reception ==
=== Critical reception ===
According to Metacritic, which collected 27 reviews and calculated an average score of 88 out of 100, the film received "universal acclaim". Rotten Tomatoes, another aggregator, reports that 87% of 84 reviews are positive, and the average rating is 8.3/10. The site's critical consensus reads: "Epic in length, thrilling to behold, and utterly absorbing, Winter Sleep demands – and rewards – viewers' patient attention".

Writing for The Guardian at the film's Cannes screening, Xan Brooks said that "in fits and starts, this is a stunning picture. At its best, Winter Sleep shows Ceylan to be as psychologically rigorous, in his way, as Ingmar Bergman before him". Robbie Collin of The Telegraph said that the film is "still fiendishly intelligent stuff from the director, nudging back the limits of what we expect of cinema and also what it expects of us: a mighty tale of what becomes of a man when his heart goes into hibernation".

IndieWire praised the film and defined it as a "mesmerizing, superbly acted portrait of a wealthy, self-involved landowner and the various figures impacted by his reign" while The Telegraph called it a "bold, beautiful - and very long - film about a failing marriage" The Guardian also gave the film a glowing review describing it as a harsh "character study" and a "stunning picture" while praising Haluk Bilginer's "magnificent performance". Another positive review came from Variety. Film critic Justin Chang called the film a "richly engrossing experience" and asserted that Nuri Bilge Ceylan is at his "peak" with Winter Sleep. Another critic, Ben Kenigsberg, noting Winter Sleep was the longest film in the Cannes film competition, pointed out that the film was an awards favorite from the get-go. He also found "the movie's slow revelation of character detail quietly devastating".

More positive reviews followed. Huffington Post reviewer Karin Badt called the film a "masterpiece" and noted that there is "movement and growth and self-realization" in the characters and none of them are "black-and-white". Also, the ending of the film was defined as "ambiguous" leaving parts of the movie to the interpretation of the viewer. Way Too Indie awarded the film 9.7 points out of 10, commenting: "What Bela Tarr did with images, Nuri Bilge Ceylan accomplishes with dialogue; one hundred percent inclusive assimilation. You literally get lost inside this world that seems to balance on the periphery of humanity itself. But, believe it or not, that’s just the surface. If you put your trust in Ceylan and his troupe of brilliant actors, every action will reveal deeper meanings, every frame will contain significant details, and you will leave the theater completely nourished". TIME Magazine remarked that it was no surprise that Winter Sleep won the award and noted: "Winter Sleep probes the psychology of a Turkish landowner confronting crises from his young wife, his sister and his aggrieved tenants". Irish Times called the film "terrific" and commented: "So leisurely is Winter Sleep, it makes Once Upon a Time in Anatolia, his last film, feel like an episode of The A-Team". Cine Vue noted that while Ceylan's previous film Once upon a Time in Anatolia might have been inspired by Dostoevsky, Winter Sleep took its inspiration from Chekhov. The reviewer added: "The pacing of Ceylan's latest will inevitably be a hurdle for many viewers, as a slow-burn beginning with numerous scenes of dialogue played out in full gets even more unhurried in a pair of marathon confrontations".

=== Interpretation ===
According to reviewer Robbie Collin, Aydın sees himself as the region's kind ruler, intervening in the business of the townspeople below the mountain, whereas in reality, almost everyone, including his wife, dislikes Aydın.

When the snow season approaches and the guests depart, the tension between Aydın, his wife, his sister who lives with him, and the village people takes over by long dialogues. Conversations dominate the film as the inner workings of the characters are slowly revealed. Variety reviewer Justin Chang notes that the argument between Hidayet and İsmail in the beginning of the film all happens "while Aydın keeps a timid distance [and this is] just a minor example of his complacency and casual indifference to the suffering around him".

Collin wrote:

It turns out that most people have at least one very good reason to dislike Aydin: even his wife, whose charity fundraising efforts he dismisses laughingly, criticising the state of her bookkeeping like a teacher ticking off a particularly slow pupil.

Only one man, the obsequious imam, makes a concerted effort to get along with him, although Aydin is annoyed by his flattering talk and insincere, teeth-baring grins, and obliquely insults him in his newspaper column.

Aydın's comfort is, however, "challenged by the conversations that ensue between him and the poor family, his wife and his sister on topics ranging from civic responsibility to evil".

=== Accolades ===
The film won the Palme d'Or at the 67th Cannes Film Festival. Jane Campion, Jury President, said at a press conference after the awards program that "the film had such a beautiful rhythm and took me in. I could have stayed there for a couple of more hours. It was masterful." The longest film in competition by far, Winter Sleep's Palme d'Or marked the culmination of the career of Nuri Bilge Ceylan, who has twice received the festival's second-place honor, the Grand Prix (for 2002's Uzak and for 2011's Once Upon a Time in Anatolia) and who won a directing prize for 2008's Three Monkeys. Nuri Bilge Ceylan also won the award for Achievement in Directing for the film at the 2014 Asia Pacific Screen Awards.

Ceylan said in his acceptance speech that it was "a great surprise" when he took the stage, noting that it was perhaps a fitting choice in a year that marked the 100th anniversary of Turkish cinema. Tacitly acknowledging the 2013–14 protests in Turkey that led to the deaths of 11 people, the director said, "I want to dedicate the prize to all the young people of Turkey, including those who lost their lives". He also mentioned the workers who were killed in the Soma mine disaster, which occurred on the day prior to the commencement of the awards event. Although it divided critics and audiences with its reams of dialogue and challenging 196-minute running time, the film became an early critics’ favorite and Palme d'Or contender when it screened on the festival's third day. The film was selected as the Turkish entry for the Best Foreign Language Film at the 87th Academy Awards, but was not nominated.

Award	Date of ceremony	Category	Recipient(s)	Result	Ref(s)
Asia Pacific Screen Awards	11 December 2014	Achievement in Directing	Nuri Bilge Ceylan	Won	
Bodil Awards	28 February 2015	Best Non-American Film	Nuri Bilge Ceylan	Nominated	
Cannes Film Festival	14 – 25 May 2014	Palme d'Or	Nuri Bilge Ceylan	Won	
Cannes Film Festival	14 – 25 May 2014	FIPRESCI Prize	Nuri Bilge Ceylan	Won	
César Awards	20 February 2015	Best Foreign Film	Nuri Bilge Ceylan	Nominated	
European Film Awards	13 December 2014	Best Film	Nuri Bilge Ceylan and Zeynep Ozbatur Atakan	Nominated	
European Film Awards	13 December 2014	Best Director	Nuri Bilge Ceylan	Nominated	
European Film Awards	13 December 2014	Best Screenwriter	Ebru Ceylan and Nuri Bilge Ceylan	Nominated	
London Film Critics' Circle	18 January 2015	Best Foreign Language Film	Nuri Bilge Ceylan	Nominated	
Los Angeles Film Critics Association	7 December 2014	Best Foreign Language Film	Nuri Bilge Ceylan	Runner-up	
Palm Springs International Film Festival	January 2015	Best Actor	Haluk Bilginer	Won	

== See also ==
- List of submissions to the 87th Academy Awards for Best Foreign Language Film
- List of Turkish submissions for the Academy Award for Best Foreign Language Film
