= Michael Phillips (critic) =

American film critic

- Phillips in 2017
- Born: March 11, 1961 (age 65); Kenosha, Wisconsin, U.S.
- Occupation: Film critic
- Years active: 1983–present
- Spouses: Ann Jarmusch (divorced); Andrea Lenaburg (divorced) Heidi Stevens (m. 2013; div. 2023)
- Children: 1

Michael Phillips (born March 11, 1961) is an American film critic formerly for the Chicago Tribune newspaper.

== Early life ==
Phillips was born in Kenosha, Wisconsin, and spent most of his early years in Racine.

== Career ==
Prior to being film critic for the Chicago Tribune, Phillips was the drama critic of the Tribune; the Los Angeles Times; the St. Paul Pioneer Press; The San Diego Union-Tribune; and the Dallas Times Herald.

From 2006 through August 2008, he appeared frequently on At the Movies with Ebert & Roeper, first as one of numerous guest critics filling in for the late Roger Ebert while he was on medical leave, and becoming a semipermanent cohost with Richard Roeper in the months before Roeper and Ebert ended their association with the series. On August 5, 2009, Phillips was hired along with New York Times critic A. O. Scott to replace hosts Ben Lyons and Ben Mankiewicz. The show was cancelled after one season due to low ratings, concluding its run in August 2010.

Phillips has introduced over 100 feature films for Turner Classic Movies. He appears on the Filmspotting podcast. He hosted a series about movie music called The Film Score and contributes to Soundtrack both for WFMT-FM (98.7).

In 2025, the Chicago Tribune eliminated its film critic role and Phillips accepted a buyout. His final review for the paper, published August 14, was for the film Highest 2 Lowest. His final piece for the paper overall, published September 4, was a preview for movies coming out in the fall of 2025.

== Preferences ==
In an interview with Rotten Tomatoes, Phillips listed his five favorite films (in chronological order):

1. The Passion of Joan of Arc
2. His Girl Friday
3. Citizen Kane
4. The Band Wagon
5. Taxi Driver

=== Best films of the year ===
Each year, from 2005 until 2024, Phillips prepares a list of the top ten films of the year. In 2009, he also made a list for the films of the 2000s decade.

| Year | #1 | #2 | #3 | #4 | #5 | #6 | #7 | #8 | #9 | #10 |
|---|---|---|---|---|---|---|---|---|---|---|
| 2005 | Capote | King Kong | The Three Burials of Melquiades Estrada | Nuit noire 17 octobre 1961 | The 40-Year-Old Virgin | The Squid and the Whale | Junebug | Le Grand Voyage | Pride and Prejudice | Brokeback Mountain |
| 2006 | Climates | United 93 | Little Children | The Death of Mr. Lazarescu | Letters from Iwo Jima | Borat | The War Tapes | Casino Royale | The Queen | Caché |
| 2007 | Once | The Diving Bell and the Butterfly | 4 Months, 3 Weeks, 2 Days | Ratatouille | There Will Be Blood | No End in Sight | Margot at the Wedding | The Bourne Ultimatum | The Assassination of Jesse James by the Coward Robert Ford | Knocked Up and Juno |
| 2008 | WALL-E | The Class | A Christmas Tale | Let the Right One In | The Flight of the Red Balloon | Alexandra | Man on Wire | Snow Angels | Still Life | The Dark Knight |
| 2009 | Up | Where the Wild Things Are | Of Time and the City | The Hurt Locker | A Serious Man | Adventureland | A Single Man | Sugar | In the Loop | Me and Orson Welles |
| 2000s | There Will Be Blood | Ratatouille | Climates | Once | Y Tu Mamá También | Zodiac | United 93 | Mulholland Drive | Gosford Park | Minority Report |
| 2010 | The Kids are All Right | The Secret in Their Eyes | Boxing Gym | Last Train Home | Greenberg | Carlos | The Social Network | The King's Speech | The Ghost Writer | The Fighter |
| 2011 | Poetry | Moneyball | Certified Copy | The Descendants | The Interrupters | Guy and Madeline on a Park Bench | A Separation | The Tree of Life | Tinker Tailor Soldier Spy | Weekend |
| 2012 | Zero Dark Thirty | Lincoln | Once Upon a Time in Anatolia | The Master | Amour | Chico and Rita | The Color Wheel | Searching for Sugar Man | Flight | Moonrise Kingdom |
| 2013 | Her | 12 Years a Slave | Consuming Spirits | Stories We Tell | Fruitvale Station | American Hustle | Post Tenebras Lux | Inside Llewyn Davis | Let the Fire Burn | The Gatekeepers |
| 2014 | Boyhood | The Grand Budapest Hotel | Winter Sleep | Whiplash | The Lego Movie | Listen Up Philip | Force Majeure | Mr. Turner | Dear White People | Heaven Knows What |
| 2015 | Spotlight | Anomalisa | Love & Mercy | The Diary of a Teenage Girl | Son of Saul | Carol | Beasts of No Nation | Creed | Heart of a Dog | Tangerine |
| 2016 | Moonlight | La La Land | Manchester by the Sea | Toni Erdmann | O.J.: Made in America | Krisha | The Witch | Hell or High Water | Don't Think Twice | The Fits |
| 2017 | Lady Bird | A Ghost Story | Get Out | Phantom Thread | Rat Film | Mudbound | Good Time | Raw | The Florida Project | Call Me by Your Name |
| 2018 | The Rider | Roma | Can You Ever Forgive Me? | The Favourite | Minding the Gap | Widows | First Reformed | Sorry to Bother You | Zama | Black Panther |
| 2019 | Parasite | Marriage Story | Ash Is Purest White | Portrait of a Lady on Fire | The Irishman | One Child Nation | Waves | Present.Perfect. | The Last Black Man in San Francisco | Little Women |
| 2020 | Lovers Rock | First Cow | American Utopia | Nomadland | City So Real | Ma Rainey's Black Bottom | The Assistant | Mangrove | The Vast of Night | Never Rarely Sometimes Always |
| 2021 | A Night of Knowing Nothing | The Underground Railroad | Drive My Car | Passing | West Side Story | The Lost Daughter | Licorice Pizza | Summer of Soul | It's a Sin | The Green Knight and The Tragedy of Macbeth |
| 2022 (Note: The 2022 edition was presented in alphabetical order.) | All the Beauty and the Bloodshed | Compartment No. 6 | EO | Kimi | Let the Little Light Shine | Marcel the Shell with Shoes On | Saint Omer | Tár | Turning Red | The Woman King |
| 2023 | Past Lives | The Boy | Killers of the Flower Moon | Barbie | Are You There God? It's Me, Margaret. | The Zone of Interest | Return to Seoul | The Wonderful Story of Henry Sugar; The Rat Catcher; The Swan; & Poison | Oppenheimer | May December |
| 2024 (Note: The 2024 edition was presented in alphabetical order.) | All We Imagine as Light | Anora | The Brutalist | Challengers | Do Not Expect Too Much from the End of the World | Green Border | Janet Planet | My Old Ass | Nickel Boys | A Real Pain |

== Filmography ==
| Year | Title | Role | Notes |
|---|---|---|---|
| 2006-2010 | At the Movies | Guest Host/Co-Host | 91 episodes |
| 2008 | Entourage | Himself | Episode: "Fantasy Island" |
| 2010 | Who Wants to Be a Millionaire | Guest Expert | 5 episodes |
| 2010 | The View | Himself | 1 episode |
| 2010 | Charlie Rose | Guest | 1 episode |
| 2011 | The Early Show | Himself | 1 episode |
| 2013 | TCM Friday Night Spotlight: Future Shock! | Host | |
