= European Film Award for Best Director =

Annual award given for cinematic achievements in directing

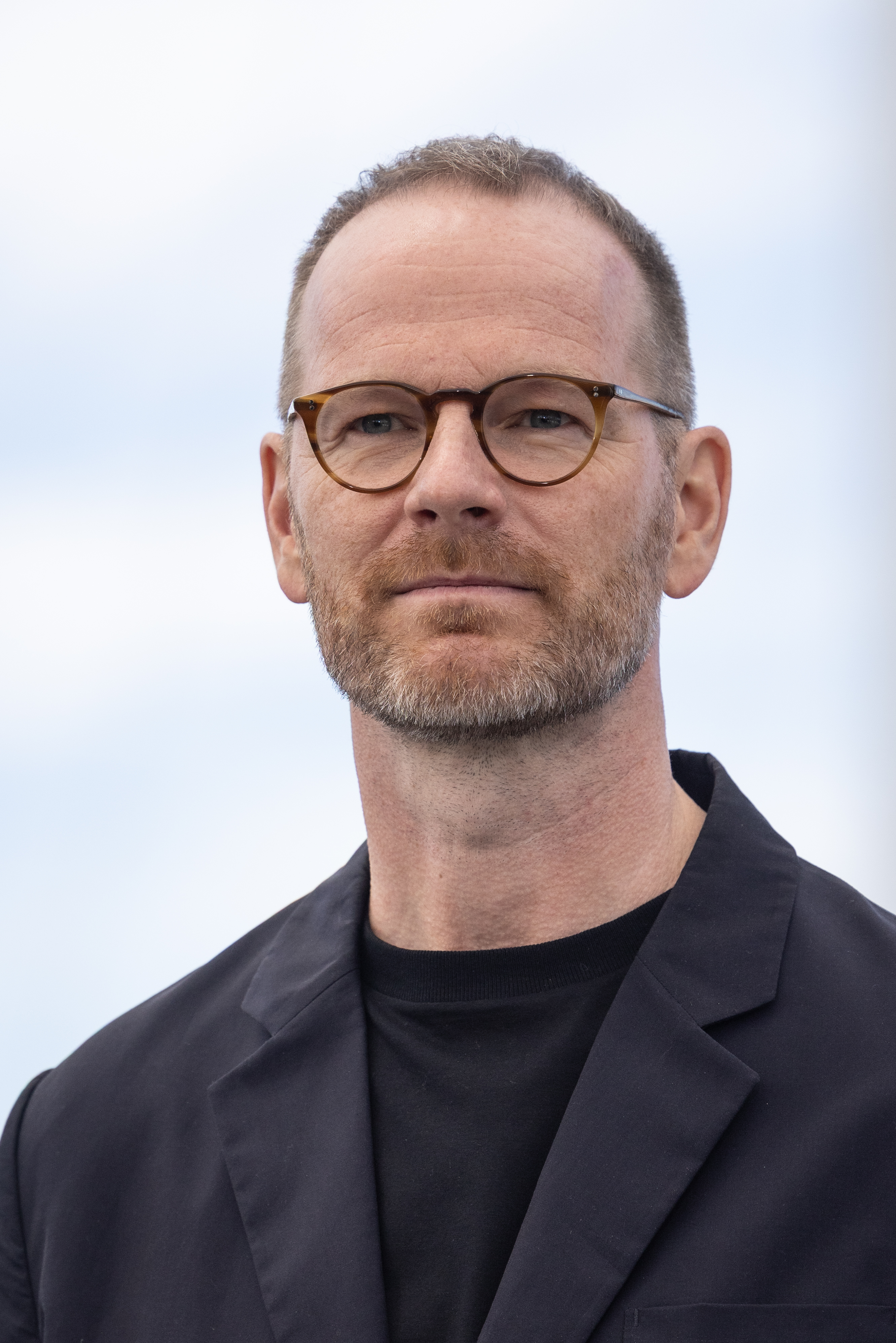
- The 2025 recipient: Joachim Trier
- Awarded for: Best Achievement in Directing
- Presented by: European Film Academy
- First award: Wim Wenders; Wings of Desire (1988)
- Currently held by: Joachim Trier; Sentimental Value (2025)
- Website: europeanfilmacademy.org

The European Film Award for Best Director is an award given out at the annual European Film Awards to recognize a director who has exhibited outstanding directing while working in a film industry. The award is presented by the European Film Academy (EFA) and was first presented in 1988 to German director Wim Wenders for Wings of Desire.

Michael Haneke is the director with most wins in the category with three, followed by Pedro Almodóvar, Paolo Sorrentino, Paweł Pawlikowski and Ruben Östlund, with two wins each. Almodóvar is the most nominated director with seven nominations for the award. Danish director Susanne Bier was the first female director to receive the award, winning for In a Better World in 2011.

== Winners and nominees ==
=== 1980s ===
Year	Winner and nominees	English title	Original title
1988 (1st)	Wim Wenders	Wings of Desire	Der Himmel über Berlin
1988 (1st)	Terence Davies	Distant Voices, Still Lives	
1988 (1st)	Manoel de Oliveira	The Cannibals	Os Canibais
1988 (1st)	Louis Malle	Au revoir, les enfants	
1988 (1st)	Sergei Parajanov	Ashik Kerib	აშიკ-ქერიბი
1989 (2nd)	Géza Bereményi	Eldorádó	
1989 (2nd)	Theodoros Angelopoulos	Landscape in the Mist	Τοπίο στην ομίχλη
1989 (2nd)	Maciej Dejczer	300 Miles to Heaven	300 mil do nieba
1989 (2nd)	Vasili Pichul	Little Vera	Ма́ленькая Ве́ра
1989 (2nd)	Jim Sheridan	My Left Foot: The Story of Christy Brown	

=== 2000s ===
Year	Winner and nominees	English title	Original title
2001 (14th)	Jean-Pierre Jeunet	Amélie	Le fabuleux destin d'Amélie Poulain
2001 (14th)	José Luis Garci	You're the One	Una historia de entonces
2001 (14th)	Péter Gothár	Passport	Paszport
2001 (14th)	Emanno Olmi	The Profession of Arms	Il mestiere delle armi
2001 (14th)	François Ozon	Under the Sand	Sous le sable
2001 (14th)	Éric Rohmer	The Lady and the Duke	L'Anglaise et le duc
2002 (15th)	Pedro Almodóvar	Talk to Her	Hable con ella
2002 (15th)	Marco Bellocchio	My Mother's Smile	L'ora di religione (Il sorriso di mia madre)
2002 (15th)	Andreas Dresen	Grill Point	Halbe Treppe
2002 (15th)	Aki Kaurismäki	The Man Without a Past	Mies vailla menneisyyttä
2002 (15th)	Mike Leigh	All or Nothing	
2002 (15th)	Ken Loach	Sweet Sixteen	
2002 (15th)	Roman Polański	The Pianist	
2002 (15th)	Alexander Sokurov	Russian Ark	Русский ковчег
2003 (16th)	Lars von Trier	Dogville	
2003 (16th)	Wolfgang Becker	Good Bye, Lenin!	
2003 (16th)	Nuri Bilge Ceylan	Distant	Uzak
2003 (16th)	Isabel Coixet	My Life Without Me	
2003 (16th)	Marco Tullio Giordana	The Best of Youth	La meglio gioventù
2003 (16th)	Michael Winterbottom	In This World	
2004 (17th)	Alejandro Amenábar	The Sea Inside	Mar adentro
2004 (17th)	Fatih Akin	Head-On	Gegen die Wand
2004 (17th)	Pedro Almodóvar	Bad Education	La mala educación
2004 (17th)	Theo Angelopoulos	Trilogy: The Weeping Meadow	Τριλογία: Το λιβάδι που δακρύζει
2004 (17th)	Nimród Antal	Kontroll	
2004 (17th)	Agnès Jaoui	Look at Me	Comme une image
2005 (18th)	Michael Haneke	Caché	
2005 (18th)	Susanne Bier	Brothers	Brødre
2005 (18th)	Roberto Faenza	Come Into the Light	Alla luce del sole
2005 (18th)	Álex de la Iglesia	The Perfect Crime	Crimen ferpecto
2005 (18th)	Paweł Pawlikowski	My Summer of Love	
2005 (18th)	Cristi Puiu	The Death of Mr. Lazarescu	Moartea domnului Lăzărescu
2005 (18th)	Wim Wenders	Don't Come Knocking	
2006 (19th)	Pedro Almodóvar	Volver	
2006 (19th)	Susanne Bier	After the Wedding	Efter brylluppet
2006 (19th)	Emanuele Crialese	The Golden Door	Nuovomondo
2006 (19th)	Florian Henckel von Donnersmarck	The Lives of Others	Das Leben der Anderen
2006 (19th)	Ken Loach	The Wind That Shakes the Barley	
2006 (19th)	Michael Winterbottom and Mat Whitecross	The Road to Guantanamo	
2007 (20th)	Cristian Mungiu	4 Months, 3 Weeks and 2 Days	4 luni, 3 săptămâni şi 2 zile
2007 (20th)	Fatih Akin	The Edge of Heaven	Auf der anderen Seite
2007 (20th)	Roy Andersson	You, the Living	Du levande
2007 (20th)	Stephen Frears	The Queen	
2007 (20th)	Kevin Macdonald	The Last King of Scotland	
2007 (20th)	Giuseppe Tornatore	The Unknown	La sconosciuta
2008 (21st)	Matteo Garrone	Gomorrah	Gomorra
2008 (21st)	Laurent Cantet	The Class	Entre les murs
2008 (21st)	Andreas Dresen	Cloud 9	Wolke neun
2008 (21st)	Ari Folman	Waltz with Bashir	ואלס עם באשיר
2008 (21st)	Steve McQueen	Hunger	
2008 (21st)	Paolo Sorrentino	Il Divo	
2009 (22nd)	Michael Haneke	The White Ribbon	Das weiße Band
2009 (22nd)	Pedro Almodóvar	Broken Embraces	Los abrazos rotos
2009 (22nd)	Andrea Arnold	Fish Tank	
2009 (22nd)	Jacques Audiard	A Prophet	Un prophète
2009 (22nd)	Danny Boyle	Slumdog Millionaire	
2009 (22nd)	Lars von Trier	Antichrist	

=== 2010s ===
Year	Winner and nominees	English title	Original title
2010 (23rd)	Roman Polanski	The Ghost Writer	
2010 (23rd)	Olivier Assayas	Carlos	
2010 (23rd)	Semih Kaplanoğlu	Honey	Bal
2010 (23rd)	Samuel Maoz	Lebanon	
2010 (23rd)	Paolo Virzì	The First Beautiful Thing	La prima cosa bella
2011 (24th)	Susanne Bier	In a Better World	Hævnen
2011 (24th)	Jean-Pierre Dardenne & Luc Dardenne	The Kid with a Bike	Le Gamin au vélo
2011 (24th)	Aki Kaurismäki	Le Havre	
2011 (24th)	Béla Tarr	The Turin Horse	A torinói ló
2011 (24th)	Lars von Trier	Melancholia	
2012 (25th)	Michael Haneke	Amour	
2012 (25th)	Nuri Bilge Ceylan	Once Upon a Time in Anatolia	Bir zamanlar Anadolu'da
2012 (25th)	Steve McQueen	Shame	
2012 (25th)	Thomas Vinterberg	The Hunt	Jagten
2012 (25th)	Paolo and Vittorio Taviani	Caesar Must Die	Cesare deve morire
2013 (26th)	Paolo Sorrentino	The Great Beauty	La grande belleza
2013 (26th)	Pablo Berger	Blancanieves	
2013 (26th)	Felix van Groeningen	The Broken Circle Breakdown	
2013 (26th)	Abdellatif Kechiche	Blue Is the Warmest Colour	La Vie d'Adèle – Chapitres 1 & 2
2013 (26th)	François Ozon	In the House	Dans la maison
2013 (26th)	Giuseppe Tornatore	The Best Offer	La migliore offerta
2014 (27th)	Paweł Pawlikowski	Ida	
2014 (27th)	Nuri Bilge Ceylan	Winter Sleep	Kış Uykusu
2014 (27th)	Steven Knight	Locke	
2014 (27th)	Ruben Östlund	Force Majeure	Turist
2014 (27th)	Paolo Virzì	Human Capital	Il capitale umano
2014 (27th)	Andrey Zvyagintsev	Leviathan	Левиафан
2015 (28th)	Paolo Sorrentino	Youth	
2015 (28th)	Roy Andersson	A Pigeon Sat on a Branch Reflecting on Existence	En duva satt på en gren och funderade på tillvaron
2015 (28th)	Yorgos Lanthimos	The Lobster	
2015 (28th)	Nanni Moretti	Mia Madre	
2015 (28th)	Sebastian Schipper	Victoria	
2015 (28th)	Małgorzata Szumowska	Body	Ciało
2016 (29th)	Maren Ade	Toni Erdmann	
2016 (29th)	Pedro Almodóvar	Julieta	
2016 (29th)	Ken Loach	I, Daniel Blake	
2016 (29th)	Cristian Mungiu	Graduation	Bacalaureat
2016 (29th)	Paul Verhoeven	Elle	
2017 (30th)	Ruben Östlund	The Square	
2017 (30th)	Ildikó Enyedi	On Body and Soul	Testről és lélekről
2017 (30th)	Aki Kaurismäki	The Other Side of Hope	Toivon tuolla puolen
2017 (30th)	Yorgos Lanthimos	The Killing of a Sacred Deer	
2017 (30th)	Andrey Zvyagintsev	Loveless	Нелюбовь (Nelyubov)
2018 (31st)	Paweł Pawlikowski	Cold War	Zimna wojna
2018 (31st)	Ali Abbasi	Border	Gräns
2018 (31st)	Matteo Garrone	Dogman	
2018 (31st)	Samuel Maoz	Foxtrot	פוֹקְסטְרוֹט
2018 (31st)	Alice Rohrwacher	Happy as Lazzaro	Lazzaro felice
2019 (32nd)	Yorgos Lanthimos	The Favourite	
2019 (32nd)	Pedro Almodóvar	Pain and Glory	Dolor y gloria
2019 (32nd)	Marco Bellocchio	The Traitor	Il traditore
2019 (32nd)	Roman Polanski	An Officer and a Spy	J'accuse
2019 (32nd)	Céline Sciamma	Portrait of a Lady on Fire	Portrait de la jeune fille en feu

=== 2020s ===
Year	Winner and nominees	English title	Original title
2020 (33rd)	Thomas Vinterberg	Another Round	Druk
2020 (33rd)	Agnieszka Holland	Charlatan	Šarlatán
2020 (33rd)	Jan Komasa	Corpus Christi	Boże Ciało
2020 (33rd)	Pietro Marcello	Martin Eden	
2020 (33rd)	François Ozon	Summer of 85	Été 85
2020 (33rd)	Maria Sødahl	Hope	Håp
2021 (34th)	Jasmila Žbanić	Quo Vadis, Aida?	
2021 (34th)	Radu Jude	Bad Luck Banging or Loony Porn	Babardeală cu bucluc sau porno balamuc
2021 (34th)	Florian Zeller	The Father	
2021 (34th)	Paolo Sorrentino	The Hand of God	È stata la mano di Dio
2021 (34th)	Julia Ducournau	Titane	
2022 (35th)	Ruben Östlund	Triangle of Sadness	
2022 (35th)	Lukas Dhont	Close	
2022 (35th)	Marie Kreutzer	Corsage	
2022 (35th)	Jerzy Skolimowski	Eo	IO
2022 (35th)	Ali Abbasi	Holy Spider	عنکبوت مقدس
2022 (35th)	Alice Diop	Saint Omer	
2023 (36th)	Justine Triet	Anatomy of a Fall	Anatomie d'une chute
2023 (36th)	Aki Kaurismäki	Fallen Leaves	Kuolleet lehdet
2023 (36th)	Agnieszka Holland	Green Border	Zielona granica
2023 (36th)	Matteo Garrone	Me Captain	Io capitano
2023 (36th)	Jonathan Glazer	The Zone of Interest	
2024 (37th)	Jacques Audiard	Emilia Pérez	
2024 (37th)	Andrea Arnold	Bird	
2024 (37th)	Pedro Almodóvar	The Room Next Door	La habitación de al lado
2024 (37th)	Mohammad Rasoulof	The Seed of the Sacred Fig	دانه‌ی انجیر معابد
2024 (37th)	Maura Delpero	Vermiglio	
2025 (38th)	Joachim Trier	Sentimental Value	Affeksjonsverdi
2025 (38th)	Yorgos Lanthimos	Bugonia	
2025 (38th)	Oliver Laxe	Sirāt	
2025 (38th)	Jafar Panahi	It Was Just an Accident	یک تصادف ساده
2025 (38th)	Mascha Schilinski	Sound of Falling	In die Sonne schauen
2026 (39th)	Javier Calvo and Javier Ambrossi	La bola negra	
2026 (39th)	Cristian Mungiu	Fjord	
2026 (39th)	Paweł Pawlikowski	Fatherland	
2026 (39th)	Sandra Wollner	Everytime	
2026 (39th)	Andrey Zvyagintsev	Minotaur	Минотавр

== Multiple wins and nominations ==
=== Multiple wins ===
Wins	Director
3	Michael Haneke
2	Pedro Almodóvar
2	Ruben Östlund
2	Paweł Pawlikowski
2	Paolo Sorrentino

=== Most nominations ===
Nominations	Director
7	Pedro Almodóvar
4	Aki Kaurismäki
4	Yorgos Lanthimos
4	Pawel Pawlikowski
4	Paolo Sorrentino
3	Susanne Bier
3	Nuri Bilge Ceylan
3	Matteo Garrone
3	Michael Haneke
3	Ken Loach
3	Cristian Mungiu
3	Ruben Östlund
3	François Ozon
3	Roman Polanski
3	Lars Von Trier
3	Andrey Zvyagintsev
2	Ali Abbasi
2	Fatih Akın
2	Roy Andersson
2	Theo Angelopoulos
2	Andrea Arnold
2	Jacques Audiard
2	Marco Bellocchio
2	Andreas Dresen
2	Agnieszka Holland
2	Samuel Maoz
2	Steve McQueen
2	Cristian Mungiu
2	Giuseppe Tornatore
2	Thomas Vinterberg
2	Paolo Virzì
2	Wim Wenders
2	Michael Winterbottom
