= Mehmet Emin Toprak =

Turkish actor

- Born: 11 September 1974; Yenice, Çanakkale, Turkey
- Died: 2 December 2002 (aged 28); Çan, Çanakkale, Turkey
- Occupation: Film actor
- Years active: 1997–2002
- Relatives: Nuri Bilge Ceylan (cousin)

Mehmet Emin Toprak (11 September 1974 – 2 December 2002) was a Turkish film actor.

Toprak starred in the critically acclaimed 2002 film Uzak. He died in a car crash on the way back from the Ankara Film Festival near the town of Çan, at the age of 28.

A few weeks after the accident, the film Uzak was shown at the 2003 Cannes Film Festival, where Toprak was posthumously awarded Best Actor.

== Personal life ==
Toprak collaborated with his cousin Nuri Bilge Ceylan in his films. He had been married for five months at the time of his death.

== Filmography ==
- Kasaba (The Small Town, 1997)
- Mayıs Sıkıntısı (Clouds of May, 1999)
- Uzak (Distant, 2002)

== Awards and nominations ==
Year	Awards	Category	Nominated work	Result
1999	Turkish Film Critics Association	Best Supporting Actor	Mayıs Sıkıntısı	Nominated
2002	Antalya Golden Orange Film Festival	Best Supporting Actor	Uzak	Won
2002	Turkish Film Critics Association	Best Actor	Uzak	Nominated
2003	Cannes Film Festival	Best Actor	Uzak	Won
2004	Singapore International Film Festival	Best Actor	Uzak	Won
