= Doğu Demirkol =

Turkish film actor

- Born: Aydın Doğu Demirkol; 6 September 1988 (age 38); Ankara, Turkey
- Occupations: Comedian, actor
- Years active: 2012–present

Aydın Doğu Demirkol (born 6 September 1988) is a Turkish comedian and actor.

== Personal life ==
Demirkol was born in Ankara. His mother was a lawyer originally from Mersin and his father was a doctor from Balıkesir who was of Circassian descent. He went to middle school in Amasya and finished high school in Ankara. He later graduated from Istanbul University with a degree in computer science.

== Career ==
=== Early years ===
Demirkol first became known for sharing comedy videos on his social media accounts, and he subsequently took part in Yetenek Sizsiniz Türkiye as a contestant in 2012. He later started doing stand-up shows at the Old City Comedy Club, where he was discovered by Murat Gençoğlu and invited to perform on stage at BKM Mutfak. In 2015, he hosted the Açık Mikrofon show at Beşiktaş Cultural Center. In 2016, together with other Açık Mikrofon hosts, including Yavuz Günal, Tuna Kalınsaz, Murat Gençoğlu, and Yusuf Altıntaş, he performed the stand-up show Eski Açık. After getting positive reactions for his performance there, he was invited to join the Güldür Güldür Show TV program for a short stand-up performance.

In 2016, together with Kalben he appeared in a five-minute commercial for Garanti BBVA. In the sketch, titled Fakat O Ne, he portrayed a man who has difficulty in making it to the end of the month, while having dramatic daily expenditures.

=== Rise to prominence ===
Demirkol made his cinematic debut in 2018 with his role as Zafer in Ölümlü Dünya, which was directed by Ali Atay. In the same year, he appeared as Sinan Karasu in Ahlat Ağacı, which was directed by Nuri Bilge Ceylan and screened at the 2018 Cannes Film Festival.

In 2019, he appeared in 25-episode mockumentary for Garanti Emeklilik, titled Parayı Tutamayan Adam, which saw him portray a man struggling to keep his money in his pocket, and when he was about to lose his future and loved ones he meets a coach and learns how to manage his finances.

In 2020, he landed his first television role on the TRT 1 series Tutunamayanlar, in which he played the role of Tarık Şakrak. In the same year, he appeared as Adem Ballı in the movie Bayi Toplantısı, the script for which was written by İbrahim Büyükak. At the end of 2020 and 2021, he was chosen as the presenter of the special new year stand-up program broadcast by GAİN.

In 2021, he played the leading role in Doğu, an absurdist comedy series based on his own life that was made available on BluTV. In the same year, his duet with Mustafa Sandal, titled "Tekrar", was published with a short as well as a long music video. Both versions contained references to Sandal's old music videos.

In 2022, Demirkol was chosen as a judge for FOX's reality singing competition Maske Kimsin Sen? alongside Eda Ece, Melis Sezen and Alican Yücesoy. In September 2022, he began presenting his own talk show Doğu Demirkol ile Alelade Show on Star TV. He additionally appeared in Turkcell's "Turkey's Digital Stories" commercial series.

== Filmography ==
Film
Year	Title	Role
2018	Ahlat Ağacı	Sinan Karasu
2018	Ölümlü Dünya	Zafer
2020	Bayi Toplantısı	Adem Ballı

TV series
Year	Title	Role	Network
2020	Tutunamayanlar	Tarık Şakrak	TRT 1
2021–	Doğu	Doğu Demirkol	BluTV

TV programs
Year	Title	Role
2012	Yetenek Sizsiniz Türkiye	Himself/ contestant
2016	Güldür Güldür Show	Himself
2019	O Ses Türkiye	Himself
2020	GAİN 2021 New Year Special Program	Himself/ (stand-up show)
2021	GAİN 2022 New Year Special Program	Himself/ (stand-up show)
2022	Maske Kimsin Sen?	Himself/ judge
2022–	Doğu Demirkol ile Alelade Show	Himself/ presenter

== Discography ==
Single

- 2021: "Tekrar" (feat. Mustafa Sandal)

== Awards ==
Year	Award	Category
2019	51st Turkish Film Critics Association Awards	Best Actor
2021	GQ Türkiye 2021 'Men of the Year' Awards	Comedian of the Year
