= About Dry Grasses =

2023 film by Nuri Bilge Ceylan

- French theatrical release poster
- Turkish: Kuru Otlar Üstüne
- Directed by: Nuri Bilge Ceylan
- Written by: Nuri Bilge Ceylan; Ebru Ceylan; Akın Aksu
- Produced by: Nuri Bilge Ceylan
- Starring: Deniz Celiloğlu; Merve Dizdar; Musab Ekici
- Cinematography: Kürşat Üresin; Cevahir Şahin
- Edited by: Nuri Bilge Ceylan; Oğuz Atabaş
- Music by: Philip Timofeyev
- Production companies: NBC Film; Memento Production; Komplizen Film
- Distributed by: Memento Distribution (France); Bir Film (Turkey); eksystent Filmverleih (Germany)
- Release dates: 19 May 2023 (Cannes); 12 July 2023 (France); 29 September 2023 (Turkey); 16 May 2024 (Germany)
- Running time: 197 minutes
- Countries: Turkey; France; Germany
- Language: Turkish
- Box office: US$2.3 million

About Dry Grasses (Turkish: Kuru Otlar Üstüne) is a 2023 Turkish-language drama film directed by Nuri Bilge Ceylan and co-written by Ceylan, Ebru Ceylan, and Akın Aksu. Starring Deniz Celiloğlu, Merve Dizdar and Musab Ekici, it follows a teacher working in rural eastern Anatolia with hopes of moving to Istanbul when he is accused of abusing a student. The film premiered in the main competition section of the 2023 Cannes Film Festival, where Dizdar won the Best Actress award. It was selected as the Turkish entry for the Best International Feature Film at the 96th Academy Awards, but was not nominated.

== Plot ==
Samet is a teacher who used to live in Istanbul but has been assigned to a post at a remote village in Eastern Anatolia for years. He comes back from holidays for the winter term. He and his co-worker and roommate Kenan are soon accused of inappropriate behavior by two female pupils. To Samet's dismay, one of them is Sevim, who has been so far a protégée of his. In parallel, both Samet and Kenan meet together, and then separately, Nuray, a teacher in a neighboring village. The latter has been the victim of a terrorist explosion some time before and misses a leg. Together they discuss the possibilities and limits of living in the region. While Kenan and Nuray seem to fall in love, Samet's attitude changes and he too begins to take interest in Nuray despite his first impression.

== Cast ==
- Deniz Celiloğlu as Samet
- Merve Dizdar as Nuray
- Musab Ekici as Kenan
- Ece Bağcı as Sevim
- Erdem Şenocak as Tolga
- Yüksel Aksu as Vahit
- Münir Can Cindoruk as Feyyaz
- Onur Berk Arslanoğlu as Bekir
- Yıldırım Gücük as Director of Education
- Cengiz Bozkurt as Nail
- S. Emrah Özdemir as Sergeant
- Elif Ürse as Assistant Principal Saime
- Elit Andaç Çam as Firdevs
- Nalan Kuruçim as Kevser
- Ferhat Akgün as Guidance Counselor Atakan
- Eylem Canpolat as Halime

== Production ==
About Dry Grasses is Ceylan's ninth feature length film, and his tenth overall. He co-wrote the script with his wife Ebru Ceylan and Akın Aksu; they also co-wrote Ceylan's previous film, The Wild Pear Tree (2018). The script took around two years to complete, and filming began in March 2021 in Erzurum; nature shots were also filmed in Adıyaman. Kürşat Üresin and Cehavir Şahin served as the film's cinematographers.

About Dry Grasses received funding of €470,000 from the European Council's Eurimages fund, in addition to ₺2 million from Turkey's Ministry of Culture and Tourism. The film was produced by Ceylan's NBC Film with France's Memento Production and Germany's Komplizen Film, in co-production with Second Land, Film i Väst, Arte France Cinéma, Bayerischer Rundfunk, TRT Si̇nema, and Playtime.

== Release ==
About Dry Grasses was announced as one of nineteen films selected to compete for the Palme d'Or at the 76th Cannes Film Festival where it had its world premiere on 19 May 2023.

The film was distributed in France by Memento Distribution on 12 July 2023 under the title Les Herbes sèches. It was also invited to the 27th Lima Film Festival in the Acclaimed section, where it was screened on 12 August 2023. Following screenings were held at the 2023 Toronto International Film Festival and 2023 New York Film Festival. It was theatrically released in Turkey by Bir Film on 29 September 2023. It was also invited at the 28th Busan International Film Festival in 'Icon' section and screened on 5 October 2023. About Dry Grasses was selected as 'midfest gala' film of the 54th International Film Festival of India and was screened in November 2023. The film was released in the US by Sideshow and Janus Films on 23 February 2024. Eksystent Filmverleih distributed the film in Germany on 16 May 2024.

== Reception ==
=== Critical response ===
On Rotten Tomatoes, 92% of 71 critic reviews are positive for the film, with an average rating of 8.4/10. The site's critics consensus reads: "About Dry Grasses keeps us warm with dark humor through its unhurried and verbose wintry meditation on the human condition." On Metacritic, the film has a weighted average score of 88 out of 100, based on 26 critic reviews, indicating "universal acclaim".

=== Awards and nominations ===
Award	Date of ceremony	Category	Recipient(s)	Result	Ref.
Cannes Film Festival	27 May 2023	Palme d'Or	Nuri Bilge Ceylan	Nominated	
Cannes Film Festival	27 May 2023	Best Actress	Merve Dizdar	Won	
Chicago International Film Festival	22 October 2023	Gold Hugo	About Dry Grasses	Nominated	
Chicago International Film Festival	22 October 2023	Silver Hugo for Best Supporting Performance	Ece Bağcı	Won	
Jerusalem Film Festival	23 July 2023	The Nechama Rivlin Award for Best International Film	About Dry Grasses	Nominated	
Lumière Awards	22 January 2024	Best International Co-Production	About Dry Grasses	Won	

== See also ==
- List of submissions to the 96th Academy Awards for Best International Feature Film
- List of Turkish submissions for the Academy Award for Best International Feature Film
