= Kasaba (1997 film) =

- Directed by: Nuri Bilge Ceylan
- Written by: Nuri Bilge Ceylan
- Distributed by: NBC Film
- Release date: 1997
- Country: Turkey
- Language: Turkish

Kasaba (internationally known as The Small Town or simply The Town) is a 1997 Turkish film directed by Nuri Bilge Ceylan in his feature film debut. The film tells the story of a family living in a gloomy small town in Turkey through the eyes of children and how they cope with the increasing complexity of life as they become adults.

== Cast ==
- M. Emin Toprak as Saffet
- Havva Sağlam as Asiye
- Cihat Bütün as Ali
- Fatma Ceylan as Nine
- M. Emin Ceylan as Dede
- Sercihan Alioğlu as Baba
- Semra Yılmaz as Anne
- Latif Altıntaş as Öğretmen
- Muzaffer Özdemir as Deli Ahmet

== Reception ==
According to Camden New Journal, Kasaba garnered acclaim. On Metacritic assigned the film a weighted average score of 89 out of 100, based on 4 critics, indicating "universal acclaim".
