= Merve Dizdar =

Turkish actress (born 1986)

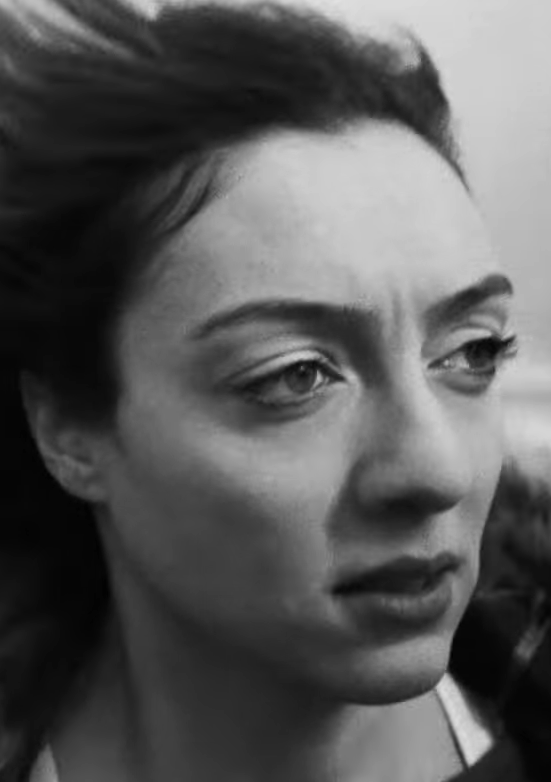
- Dizdar in 2015
- Born: 25 June 1986 (age 40); İzmir, Turkey
- Occupation: Actress
- Years active: 2010–present
- Spouse(s): Gürhan Altundaşar (m. 2018; div. 2021) Cihan Ayger (m. 2024)

Merve Dizdar (born 25 June 1986) is a Turkish actress. She is best known for her roles in War of the Eltis (2020), The Innocents (2020–2022), The Life and Movies of Erşan Kuneri (2022–present), and Snow and the Bear (2022). In 2020, she won the Golden Butterfly Award for Best Actress for her role in The Innocents. Dizdar became the first Turkish actress to win the Cannes Film Festival Award for Best Actress for her performance in About Dry Grasses (2023).

== Early life and career ==
Dizdar was born on 25 June 1986 in İzmir. She is a graduate of Çanakkale Onsekiz Mart University School of Fine Arts with a degree in acting. She received her master's degree in acting from Kadir Has University.

She started her career on stage by joining Semaver Company and continued it at Craft Theatre. Dizdar made her cinematic debut with Bir Ses Böler Geceyi (2011) alongside Cem Davran and pursued a career in television with recurring roles in the series Kavak Yelleri, Geniş Aile, Bir Yastıkta, Doksanlar, Çılgın Dershane Üniversite, and was first noted with her role in Beş Kardeş. She also worked for TRT Children, presenting the programs Arkadaşım Bıdı and 23 Nisan Şenliğe Doğru.

Dizdar won the Afife Jale Theatre Best Actress Award for her role in the play Yutmak. She then joined the cast of hit series 7 Yüz, Vatanım Sensin, and Mucize Doktor respectively. In 2020, she had a leading role with Uraz Kaygılaroğlu in the Gupse Özay's comedy film Eltilerin Savaşı, which as of April 2021 is the 22nd most-watched movie of all time in Turkey according to Box Office Türkiye. She shared the leading role with Serenay Sarıkaya, Ezgi Mola, Enis Arıkan, Şükrü Özyıldız in a musical adaptation of Alice's Adventures in Wonderland.

In 2020, she began appearing in the series Masumlar Apartmanı and won the Golden Butterfly Awards Best Actress award. She played an actress and her many roles in the Netflix spinoff comedy series Erşan Kuneri. In 2023, she starred in Nuri Bilge Ceylan's Kuru Otlar Üstüne, becoming the first Turkish actress to win at the 76th Cannes Film Festival with the Best Actress award for her portrayal of a teacher.

During her acceptance speech, Dizdar dedicated her award to Turkish women. She stated "all my sisters" who actively engage in strengthening the women's rights movement, displaying resilience and unwavering hope despite the challenges they face''. Ibrahim Uslu, the deputy chairman of the Radio and Television Supreme Council, accused Dizdar of undermining Turkey. The incident sparked reactions and debates within the country.

== Filmography ==
=== Film ===
Year	Title	Original title	Role	Notes
2011	A Noise in the Night	Bir Ses Böler Geceyi	Gülizar / Demet	
2013	Dairy Philosopher	Mandıra Filozofu	Secretary	
2016	No Way 2	Yok Artık 2	Buket	
2017	Organic Love Stories	Organik Aşk Hikayeleri	Nazlı	
2017	The Gulf	Körfez	Pınar	Premiered at the 2017 Venice International Film Festival
2018	My Name Is Batlir, Not Butler	Batlır	Yudum	
2019	One Love Two Lives	Bir Aşk İki Hayat	Sema Yaşar	
2020	War of the Eltis	Eltilerin Savaşı	Gizem Altundağ	
2021	Have You Ever Seen Fireflies?	Sen Hiç Ateşböceği Gördün mü?	İzzet	Netflix film
2022	Snow and the Bear	Kar ve Ayı	Aslı	Premiered at the 2022 Toronto International Film Festival
2022	The Garage	Tamirhane	Aynur	
2023	Alice the Musical	Alice Müzikali	Kedi	Disney+ film
2023	About Dry Grasses	Kuru Otlar Üstüne	Nuray	Premiered at the 2023 Cannes Film Festival

=== Web ===
Year	Title	Original title	Role	Platform
2017	Seven Faces	7YÜZ	Nihal	BluTV
2022–2024	The Life and Movies of Erşan Kuneri	Erşan Kuneri	Feride Orhun	Netflix
2023–present	Magarsus	Magarsus	Tansu	BluTV

=== Television ===
Year	Title	Original title	Role	Network
2010–2011	Daydreaming	Kavak Yelleri	Saliha	Kanal D
2012	Kingdom of People	İnsanlar Alemi		Star TV
2013	On a Pillow	Bir Yastıkta	Yeliz Gelin	TRT 1
2013–2014	The Nineties	Doksanlar	Selin	ATV
2014	Çilgin Dersane at the University	Çılgın Dersane Üniversitede	Özge	Show TV
2015	Orphan Flowers	Kırgın Çiçekler	İrem	ATV
2015	Five Brothers	Beş Kardeş	Fatma	Kanal D
2015	New Life	Yeni Hayat	Sekreter	
2015–2016	The Lizard	Kertenkele	İrem	ATV
2017	Face to Face	Yüz Yüze	Yeşim	Show TV
2017–2018	Wounded Love	Vatanım Sensin	Efsun	Kanal D
2020	A Miracle	Mucize Doktor	Damla	Fox
2020–2022	The Innocents	Masumlar Apartmanı	Gülben Derenoğlu Bilen	TRT 1
2021	The Red Room	Kırmızı Oda	Gülben Derenoğlu Bilen (guest actress)	TV8
2023–2024	Ömer	Ömer	Nisa	Star TV

== Theatre ==
Year	Title
2010	Çok Yaşa Dünya
2010–2011	Bir Tutam Hayat
2011–2012	Titus Andronicus
2012	Bir Kurşun Deliğine Kaç İnsan Sığar
2013	Bir İnfazın Portresi
2013	Pamuk Prenses ve Yedi Cüceler
2014	The Birds
2017	Yutmak
2019	Alice Müzikali (published in Disney Plus)
2021	Dijital Sahne: On İkinci Gece (published in YouTube)

== Awards and nominations ==
Name of the award ceremony, year presented, category, nominee of the award, and the result of the nomination
Award	Year	Category	Nominated work	Result	Ref.
Antalya Golden Orange Film Festival	2022	Best Actress – National Competition	Snow and the Bear	Won	
Ayakli Gazete TV Stars Awards	2021	Best Supporting Actress	The Innocents	Won	
Ayakli Gazete TV Stars Awards	2021	Best Theater Actress	Herself	Nominated	
Bosphorus Film Festival	2022	Best Actress – National Competition	Snow and the Bear	Won	
Cannes Film Festival	2023	Best Actress	About Dry Grasses	Won	
Golden Butterfly Awards	2021	Best Actress	The Innocents	Won	
Golden Butterfly Awards	2022	Best Actress in a Comedy Series	The Life and Movies of Erşan Kuneri	Nominated	
Izmir International Festival	2020	Best Supporting Actress – Film	One Love Two Lives	Nominated	
Izmir International Festival	2022	Best Actress – Television	The Innocents	Nominated	
PRODU Awards	2021	Best Actress in a Foreign Series	The Innocents	Nominated	
ReelHeART International Film Festival	2017	Best Ensemble Cast	Organic Love Stories	Won	
Turkish Film Critics Association Awards	2020	Best Actress	War of the Eltis	Nominated	
Turkish Film Critics Association Awards	2023	Best Actress	About Dry Grasses	Won	

- 22nd Sadri Alışık Theatre and Cinema Awards - "Most Successful Actress of the Year" - Yutmak - Craft Theatre - 2017 (nom)
- 21st Afife Theatre Awards - "Most Successful Actress of the Year" - Yutmak - Craft Theatre - 2017
