= Clouds of May =

- Directed by: Nuri Bilge Ceylan
- Written by: Nuri Bilge Ceylan
- Starring: Mehmet Emin Ceylan, Muzaffer Özdemir, Fatma Ceylan, Mehmet Emin Toprak
- Release date: 1999
- Running time: 140 minutes
- Country: Turkey
- Language: Turkish

Clouds of May (Turkish: Mayıs Sıkıntısı) is a 1999 Turkish film directed by Nuri Bilge Ceylan.

== Cast ==
- Emin Ceylan
- Muzaffer Özdemir
- Fatma Ceylan
- Emin Toprak
- Muhammed Zımbaoğlu
- Sadık İncesu

== Reception ==
Metacritic assigned the film a weighted average score of 75 out of 100, based on 4 critics, indicating "generally favorable reviews". A. O. Scott of The New York Times argued that “for much of its running time, it feels diffuse and anecdotal, but in retrospect you appreciate the subtlety and heft of the story, as well as the tricky profundity of Mr. Ceylan's approach [...] part of its magic lies in Mr. Ceylan's ability to place the world plainly before your eyes and invite you to reflect on its everyday mysteries”. In Variety, David Stratton stated that “the inordinately long preliminaries of the first hour could well be tightened. The second half, however, builds to an understated but moving and extremely satisfying climax.” The reviewer described Ceylan as having “a sly sense of humor and a deep emotional link to his characters”.
