= The Wild Pear Tree =

2018 Turkish drama film

- Film poster
- Directed by: Nuri Bilge Ceylan
- Written by: Nuri Bilge Ceylan; Ebru Ceylan; Akın Aksu
- Produced by: Zeynep Özbatur Atakan
- Starring: Doğu Demirkol; Murat Cemcir; Bennu Yıldırımlar; Hazar Ergüçlü
- Cinematography: Gökhan Tiryaki
- Edited by: Nuri Bilge Ceylan
- Distributed by: Memento Films Production
- Release dates: 18 May 2018 (Cannes); 1 June 2018 (Turkey); 15 August 2018 (France)
- Running time: 188 minutes
- Countries: Turkey; France; Germany; Bulgaria; North Macedonia; Bosnia and Herzegovina; Sweden
- Language: Turkish
- Box office: $1.7 million

The Wild Pear Tree (Turkish: Ahlat Ağacı) is a 2018 Turkish drama film directed by Nuri Bilge Ceylan. It was selected to compete for the Palme d'Or at the 2018 Cannes Film Festival. It was also selected as the Turkish entry for the Best Foreign Language Film at the 91st Academy Awards, but it was not nominated.

== Plot ==
Sinan is an aspiring young writer who has just finished college. Returning to his hometown of Çan, he sets about trying to find local funding to publish his debut manuscript, which he calls a "quirky auto-fiction meta-novel", but finds that the locals are uninterested. He also discovers that his eccentric father, Idris, has allowed his gambling addiction to disastrously reduce the family's fortune and stature. Worried about his career prospects and finding himself socially isolated in his rural hometown, Sinan wanders the countryside and engages in a series of testy conversations with various relatives and locals, including an established writer and two Imams who hold differing opinions about religion's place in the modern world.

Eventually, disgusted by his father's degenerate gambling and suspecting him of stealing money, Sinan sells his father's beloved dog for the money to have his book published. He then leaves town for his required military service. When he returns, he finds that his father has abandoned his family, and is now living as a rural shepherd. The two reconnect in a friendly conversation where Idris reveals that he has given up his long-running quixotic attempt to dig a well on his arid property, and that he has read and enjoyed Sinan's book (making him the only person who appears to have done so). In a surreal moment, it appears that Sinan has hanged himself in the abandoned well, but the film then abruptly cuts to Idris awakening. Looking about for his absent son, he walks over to the well to find Sinan at the bottom, continuing to dig.

== Cast ==
- Doğu Demirkol as Sinan Karasu
- Murat Cemcir as İdris Karasu (Sinan's father)
- Bennu Yıldırımlar as Asuman Karasu (Sinan's mother)
- Hazar Ergüçlü as Hatice
- Serkan Keskin as Süleyman
- Tamer Levent as Recep (İdris's father, Sinan's grandfather)
- Akın Aksu as Imam Veysel
- Ahmet Rıfat Şungar as Ali Rıza
- Kubilay Tunçer as İlhami
- Öner Erkan as Imam Nazmi
- Özay Fecht as Hayriye (Asuman's mother, Sinan's grandmother)
- Kadir Çermik as Mayor Adnan
- Ercüment Balakoğlu as Ramazan (Asuman's father, Sinan's grandfather)
- Sencar Sağdıç as Nevzat
- Asena Keskinci as Yasemin Karasu (Sinan's younger sister)

== Production ==
Director Nuri Bilge Ceylan describes the project as being inspired by a father and son who were neighbors of his near Çanakkale, Turkey, where he grew up. The son, Akın Aksu, agreed to contribute to the screenplay, and also plays the character of Imam Veysel in the movie. The finished script is largely drawn from Aksu's own life and his two autobiographical novels, though Ceylan describes the film as being partly based on his relationship with his own father. The film's title comes from Aksu's short story The Loneliness of the Wild Pear Tree.

Lead actor Doğu Demirkol had never acted in a film before, and Ceylan found him on Facebook. Ceylan described him as "...the smartest actor I've met to this day."

The film was primarily shot on location in the city of Çanakkale and the town and region of Çan. The Trojan Horse on the Çanakkale waterfront (where Sinan hides during a dream sequence) is a prop from the 2004 film Troy.

== Reception ==
On review aggregator Rotten Tomatoes, 94% of 81 critic reviews are positive, and the average rating is 8.4/10. The website's critics consensus reads, "The Wild Pear Tree uses a young man's post-graduation experience to pose thoughtful, engaging questions about life in modern Turkey — and the rest of the world." Metacritic, which uses a weighted average, assigned the film a score of 86 out of 100, based on 22 critics, indicating "universal acclaim". It was one of the best-reviewed films to premier at Cannes in 2018.

== See also ==
- List of submissions to the 91st Academy Awards for Best Foreign Language Film
- List of Turkish submissions for the Academy Award for Best Foreign Language Film
