= Once Upon a Time in Anatolia =

- Original theatrical poster
- Directed by: Nuri Bilge Ceylan
- Written by: Nuri Bilge Ceylan; Ercan Kesal; Ebru Ceylan
- Produced by: Zeynep Özbatur Atakan
- Starring: Muhammet Uzuner; Yılmaz Erdoğan; Taner Birsel
- Cinematography: Gökhan Tiryaki
- Edited by: Bora Gökşingöl; Nuri Bilge Ceylan
- Production company: Zeyno Film
- Distributed by: The Cinema Guild
- Release dates: 21 May 2011 (2011 Cannes Film Festival); 23 September 2011 (Turkey)
- Running time: 157 minutes
- Countries: Turkey; Bosnia and Herzegovina
- Language: Turkish

Once Upon a Time in Anatolia (Turkish: Bir Zamanlar Anadolu’da) is a 2011 internationally co-produced drama film, co-written and directed by Nuri Bilge Ceylan based on the true experience of one of the film's writers, telling the story of a group of men who search for a dead body on the Anatolian steppe. The film, which went on nationwide general release across Turkey on 23 September 2011, premiered at the 2011 Cannes Film Festival, where it was a co-winner of the Grand Prix.

== Plot ==
A group of men drive around at night in the rural area of Keskin looking for the buried body of murder victim Yasar Toprak. The perpetrator Kenan recalls burying him near a water fountain with his mentally challenged brother, but the fact that he was drunk during it, the lack of sunlight, and the repetitive landscapes make it difficult for him to find. As the night goes on, prosecutor Nusret tells doctor Cemal about a case he was involved in where a woman correctly informed her husband of her date of death months before giving birth to their child. He explains that she died of a heart attack, but Cemal points out that she could have brought it on intentionally with medication.

Commissioner Naci stops Cemal from giving Kenan a cigarette, claiming he has to earn it. The group stops at a nearby village, where the mayor asks Nusret to get the governor to help fund a morgue, as his town is mostly populated by the elderly and their emigrant children want to see their bodies before burial. The wind causes a power outage and the mayor's daughter brings the group tea, where the beauty of her face by lamplight causes Kenan to shed tears. He explains to Naci that he revealed that Yasar's son Adem was actually his, which caused a fight in which Yasar was killed. Naci gives him a cigarette.

As the sun rises, Kenan finds the body and the authorities realize it has been hogtied. When asked why, Keenan said it was hogtied so it could fit in the trunk of his car. The body is untied. Having forgotten a body bag, they re-tie the body and force it into the trunk of one of the cars. As they return to Keskin, Adem and his mother Gülnaz watch Kenan emerge from the car. Adem hits Kenan in the head with a small stone, causing him to weep.

In conversation with Nusret, Cemal notes a specific drug that could have easily been used to induce a heart attack, which Nusret admits he is familiar with due to his father-in-law's heart problems. Cemel muses that the woman may have committed suicide because of her husband's infidelity but waited to do so after the baby was born. Nusret dismiss Cemel’s conjecture. But the way Nusret has describes the situation implies that the woman was his wife. Gülnaz confirms that the body is Yasar, and an autopsy reveals the presence of dirt in his lungs after she leaves, indicating that he was buried alive. Cemal omits this from the report. As the technician further cuts open Yasar's body, some blood splashes onto Cemal's face. Cemal watches the Topraks leave with Yasar's belongings.

== Cast ==
- Muhammet Uzuner as Doctor Cemal
- Yılmaz Erdoğan as Police Commissar Naci
- Taner Birsel as Prosecutor Nusret
- Ahmet Mümtaz Taylan as police driver Arap Ali
- Fırat Tanış as suspect Kenan
- Ercan Kesal as mayor Muhtar
- Cansu Demirci as Cemile, Muhtar's Daughter
- Erol Erarslan as murder victim Yaşar
- Uğur Arslanoğlu as courthouse driver Tevfik
- Murat Kılıç as policeman İzzet
- Şafak Karali as courthouse clerk Abidin
- Emre Şen as gendarmerie sergeant Önder
- Burhan Yıldız as suspect Ramazan
- Nihan Okutucu as Yaşar's wife Gülnaz
- Kubilay Tunçer as autopsy technician Sakir

== Production ==
Director Nuri Bilge Ceylan grew up in a small town similar to the one in the film in terms of mentality and hierarchy, and says he feels a close connection to the characters depicted. The story is based on real events. One of Ceylan's co-writers was an actual doctor, and, in order to attain his license, had been required to work for two years in the town where the plot is set.

The story in the film is based on very similar events the co-writer experienced during this period. The title of the film references Sergio Leone's film Once Upon a Time in the West, and was something one of the drivers uttered during the actual events. When writing the screenplay, the filmmakers tried to be as realistic as possible, and the main aim was to portray the special atmosphere, which had left a strong impression on the doctor. A number of quotations from stories by Anton Chekhov were incorporated into the script.

The film was produced through Turkey's Zeyno Film, in co-production with the Bosnian company Production2006 Sarajevo, and the Turkish companies NBC Film, 1000 Volt Post Production, the Turkish Radio and Television Corporation, Imaj and Fida Film. Filming took place during eleven weeks around Keskin, a district of the Kırıkkale Province in Central Anatolia. It was shot in the CinemaScope format.

== Reception ==
The film has been met with critical acclaim. Review aggregation website Rotten Tomatoes gives the film a score of 94% based on 70 reviews, with an average rating of 8.2/10. The website's critical consensus states: "Cerebral and thrilling, Once Upon a Time in Anatolia is a meditative procedural that maintains feverish intensity throughout its unhurried runtime". Metacritic gives a weighted average rating of 82 based on reviews from 21 critics, indicating "universal acclaim".

Dave Calhoun reviewed the film for Time Out London: "Ceylan is a sly and daring screen artist of the highest order and should draw wild praise with this new film for challenging both himself and us, the audience, with this lengthy, rigorous and masterly portrait of a night and day in the life of a murder investigation." Calhoun compared the film to the director's previous works and noted how it to a lesser extent follows genre conventions: "Displaying a new interest in words and story (albeit of the most elusive kind), Once Upon A Time in Anatolia feels like a change of direction for Ceylan and may disappoint those who were especially attracted to the urbane melancholia of Uzak and Climates. ... Beyond being chronological, the film follows no obvious storytelling pattern. Things happen when they do and at a natural rhythm. ... Ceylan invites us along for the ride – but only if we're up for it."

The film received the Cannes Film Festival's second most prestigious award, the Grand Prix, in a shared win with the film The Kid with a Bike by the Dardenne brothers.

The film was selected as Turkey's official submission for the Academy Award for Best Foreign Language Film, but did not make the shortlist.

Sight & Sound listed Once Upon a Time in Anatolia as the 8th best film of 2012. Stephen Holden of The New York Times named it the sixth best movie of 2012, and "a searching reflection on the elusiveness of truth."

In 2016, the film was named as the 54th best film of the 21st century, from a poll of 177 film critics from around the world.

In 2015, Peter Bradshaw of The Guardian listed it as one of the top 50 films of the 2010s thus far.

== Awards ==
Award	Date of ceremony	Category	Nominee(s)	Result
Asia Pacific Screen Award	24 November 2011	Achievement in Cinematography	Gökhan Tiryaki	Won
Asia Pacific Screen Award	24 November 2011	Achievement in Directing	Nuri Bilge Ceylan	Won
Asia Pacific Screen Award	24 November 2011	Best Feature	Zeynep Özbatur Atakan; Mirsad Purivatra; Eda Arikan; İbrahim Şahin; Müge Kolat; Murat Akdilek; Nuri Bilge Ceylan	Nominated
Asia Pacific Screen Award	24 November 2011	Best Screenplay	Ercan Kesal; Ebru Ceylan; Nuri Bilge Ceylan	Nominated
Asia Pacific Screen Award	24 November 2011	Jury Grand Prize		Won
Cannes Film Festival	22 May 2011	Grand Prix (tied with The Kid with a Bike)	Nuri Bilge Ceylan	Won
Cannes Film Festival	22 May 2011	Palme d'Or	Nuri Bilge Ceylan	Nominated
Chicago Film Critics Association	17 December 2012	Best Foreign Language Film		Nominated
Cinemanila International Film Festival	17 November 2011	Main Competition – Best Director	Nuri Bilge Ceylan	Won
Dubai International Film Festival	7–14 December 2011	Muhr AsiaAfrica Feature: Best Cinematographer	Gökhan Tiryaki	Won
Dubai International Film Festival	7–14 December 2011	Muhr AsiaAfrica Feature: Special Jury Prize	Nuri Bilge Ceylan	Won
European Film Awards	1 December 2012	Best Cinematographer	Gökhan Tiryaki	Nominated
European Film Awards	1 December 2012	Best Director	Nuri Bilge Ceylan	Nominated
Independent Spirit Awards	23 February 2013	Best Foreign Film		Nominated
Jameson Dublin International Film Festival	26 February 2012	Best Director	Nuri Bilge Ceylan	Won
Karlovy Vary International Film Festival	9 July 2011	NETPAC Award	Nuri Bilge Ceylan	Won
London Film Critics' Circle	20 January 2013	Director of the Year	Nuri Bilge Ceylan	Nominated
London Film Critics' Circle	20 January 2013	Foreign Language Film of the Year		Nominated
New York Film Critics Circle	3 December 2012	Best Foreign Language Film		Nominated
Oslo Films from the South Festival	16 October 2011	Best Feature	Nuri Bilge Ceylan	Nominated
Philadelphia Film Festival	29 October 2011	Audience Award Honorable Mention Masters	Nuri Bilge Ceylan	Won

== See also ==
- 2011 in film
- Cinema of Turkey
- Turkish films of 2011
- List of submissions to the 84th Academy Awards for Best Foreign Language Film
- List of Turkish submissions for the Academy Award for Best Foreign Language Film
