= Ebru Ceylan =

Turkish photographer, actress, screenwriter and art director

- Born: Ebru Yapıcı; 26 January 1976 (age 50); Ankara, Turkey
- Education: Marmara University; Mimar Sinan University
- Occupations: Actress; Screenwriter
- Spouse: Nuri Bilge Ceylan

Ebru Ceylan (née Yapıcı, born 26 January 1976) is a Turkish photographer, actress, screenwriter and art director. She is married to collaborator Nuri Bilge Ceylan.

== Biography ==
Ebru Yapıcı was born in Ankara and studied film and television at Marmara University and Mimar Sinan University. The Ceylans starred together in the 2006 film Climates, which they also co-wrote, beginning a writing collaboration that would include Three Monkeys (2008), Once Upon a Time in Anatolia (2011) and the Palme d'Or-winning Winter Sleep (2014).

Nuri Bilge described their writing relationship, which Ebru opted to end after Winter Sleep, saying "Since she is my wife she has the right to say anything. We fight a lot actually, sometimes till the morning, but it's very useful". For Winter Sleep, Ebru received a nomination for the European Film Award for Best Screenwriter.

She resumed her writing collaboration with Nuri Bilge, now with Akin Aksun. The Wild Pear Tree (2018) and About Dry Grasses (2023).
