= List of Turkish submissions for the Academy Award for Best International Feature Film =

Best International Feature Film submissions from Turkey

Highlights
- Debut: 1964
- Submissions: 33
- Nominations: none
- Oscar winners: none

Turkey has submitted films for the Academy Award for Best International Feature Film (Note: The category was previously named the Academy Award for Best Foreign Language Film, but this was changed to the Academy Award for Best International Feature Film in April 2019, after the Academy deemed the word "Foreign" to be outdated.) since 1964. The Oscar is handed out annually by the United States Academy of Motion Picture Arts and Sciences to a feature-length motion picture produced outside the United States that contains primarily non-English dialogue. It was not created until the 1956 Academy Awards, in which a competitive Academy Award of Merit, known as the Best Foreign Language Film Award, was created for non-English speaking films, and has been given annually since.

As of 2026, Turkey has submitted thirty-three films, but none of them were nominated.

== Submissions ==
The Academy of Motion Picture Arts and Sciences has invited the film industries of various countries to submit their best film for the Academy Award for Best International Feature Film since 1956. The International Feature Film Committee oversees the process and reviews all the submitted films. Following this, they vote via secret ballot to determine the five nominees for the award.

For different reasons, many Turkish films were submitted for the category by other countries. Switzerland submitted two: 1982's Yol by Yilmaz Güney, that had to be smuggled into Switzerland for post-production due to political considerations after the 1980 Turkish coup d'état, and 1990's winner Journey of Hope, about Turkish refugees in Europe. Over the years, several other European countries have chosen films that were partially set in Turkey and featured large sections in Turkish including Austria (For a Moment, Freedom), France (Mustang), Germany (The Edge of Heaven) and Greece (A Touch of Spice).

Four directors have represented Turkey more than once: Tunç Başaran, Nuri Bilge Ceylan, Semih Kaplanoğlu and Yavuz Turgul.

Three Monkeys (2008) advanced to the December shortlist, but it was not nominated. As of 2026, it is the only Turkish film to advance to the shortlist (second phase of voting).

All the films submitted are primary in Turkish. Below is a list of the films that have been submitted by Turkey for review by the academy for the award by year and the respective Academy Awards ceremony.

Year (Ceremony)	Film title used in nomination	Original title	Director	Result
1964 (37th)	Dry Summer	Susuz Yaz	Metin Erksan	Not nominated
1989 (62nd)	Don't Let Them Shoot the Kite	Uçurtmayı Vurmasınlar	Tunç Başaran	Not nominated
1992 (65th)	Piano Piano Kid	Piyano Piyano Bacaksız	Tunç Başaran	Not nominated
1993 (66th)	The Blue Exile	Mavi Sürgün	Erden Kıral	Not nominated
1994 (67th)	Tarzan of Manisa	Manisa Tarzanı	Orhan Oğuz	Not nominated
1997 (70th)	The Bandit	Eşkıya	Yavuz Turgul	Not nominated
1999 (72nd)	Mrs. Salkım's Diamonds	Salkım Hanımın Taneleri	Tomris Giritlioğlu	Not nominated
2000 (73rd)	Run for Money	Kaç Para Kaç	Reha Erdem	Not nominated
2001 (74th)	Big Man, Little Love	Büyük Adam Küçük Aşk	Handan İpekçi	Not nominated
2002 (75th)	9		Ümit Ünal	Not nominated
2003 (76th)	Distant	Uzak	Nuri Bilge Ceylan	Not nominated
2005 (78th)	Lovelorn	Gönül Yarası	Yavuz Turgul	Not nominated
2006 (79th)	Ice Cream, I Scream	Dondurmam Gaymak	Yüksel Aksu	Not nominated
2007 (80th)	A Man's Fear of God	Takva	Özer Kızıltan	Not nominated
2008 (81st)	Three Monkeys	Üç Maymun	Nuri Bilge Ceylan	Made shortlist
2009 (82nd)	I Saw the Sun	Güneşi Gördüm	Mahsun Kırmızıgül	Not nominated
2010 (83rd)	Honey	Bal	Semih Kaplanoğlu	Not nominated
2011 (84th)	Once Upon a Time in Anatolia	Bir Zamanlar Anadolu'da	Nuri Bilge Ceylan	Not nominated
2012 (85th)	Where the Fire Burns	Ateşin Düştüğü Yer	İsmail Güneş	Not nominated
2013 (86th)	The Dream of a Butterfly	Kelebeğin Rüyası	Yılmaz Erdoğan	Not nominated
2014 (87th)	Winter Sleep	Kış Uykusu	Nuri Bilge Ceylan	Not nominated
2015 (88th)	Sivas		Kaan Müjdeci	Not nominated
2016 (89th)	Cold of Kalandar	Kalandar Soğuğu	Mustafa Kara	Not nominated
2017 (90th)	Ayla: The Daughter of War	Ayla	Can Ulkay	Not nominated
2018 (91st)	The Wild Pear Tree	Ahlat Ağacı	Nuri Bilge Ceylan	Not nominated
2019 (92nd)	Commitment	Bağlılık Aslı	Semih Kaplanoğlu	Not nominated
2020 (93rd)	Miracle in Cell No. 7	7. Koğuştaki Mucize	Mehmet Ada Öztekin	Not nominated
2021 (94th)	Commitment Hasan	Bağlılık Hasan	Semih Kaplanoğlu	Not nominated
2022 (95th)	Kerr		Tayfun Pirselimoğlu	Not nominated
2023 (96th)	About Dry Grasses	Kuru Otlar Üstüne	Nuri Bilge Ceylan	Not nominated
2024 (97th)	Life	Hayat	Zeki Demirkubuz	Not nominated
2025 (98th)	One of Those Days When Hemme Dies	Hemme’nin Öldüğü Günlerden Biri	Murat Fıratoğlu	Not nominated
2026 (99th)	Like a Limbless Tree	Kesilmiş Bir Ağaç Gibi	Tunç Davut	Pending

== See also ==
- List of Academy Award winners and nominees for Best International Feature Film
- List of Academy Award-winning foreign language films
- Cinema of Turkey
