= Where the Fire Burns =

2012 film

- Directed by: İsmail Güneş
- Written by: İsmail Güneş
- Starring: Elifcan Ongurlar
- Cinematography: Ercan Yilmaz
- Release date: 4 May 2012
- Running time: 105 minutes
- Country: Turkey
- Language: Turkish

Where the Fire Burns (Turkish: Ateşin Düştüğü Yer) is a 2012 Turkish drama film directed by İsmail Güneş. The film was selected as the Turkish entry for the Best Foreign Language Oscar at the 85th Academy Awards, but it did not make the final shortlist.

== Cast ==
- Elifcan Ongurlar as Ayse
- Hakan Karahan as Osman
- Yesim Ceren Bozoglu as Hatice
- Serhan Süsler as Demir
- Abdullah Sekeroglu as Hüseyin
- Ozan Göksu Sayin as Seyit
- Dean Baykan as Denis
- Özlem Balci as Asiye
- Katharina Weithaler as Stefanie
- Oguzhan Sekeroglu as Ali
- Utku Sahin as Kenan

== See also ==
- List of submissions to the 85th Academy Awards for Best Foreign Language Film
- List of Turkish submissions for the Academy Award for Best Foreign Language Film
