= Çan =

- Municipality
- Location in Turkey Çan (Marmara)
- Coordinates: 40°01′39″N 27°02′51″E
- Country: Turkey
- Province: Çanakkale
- District: Çan

Government
  - Mayor: Harun Arslan
- Elevation: 67 m (220 ft)
- Population (2021): 30,970
- Time zone: UTC+3 (TRT)
- Postal code: 17500
- Area code: 0286
- Website: www.can.bel.tr

Çan is a town in Çanakkale Province in the Marmara region of Turkey. It is the seat of Çan District. Its population is 30,970 (2021). The town lies at an elevation of 67 m (220 ft).

The 2018 film The Wild Pear Tree is set in the town.
