= Gökhan Tiryaki =

Turkish cinematographer (born 1972)

- Born: 1972 (age 53–54); Istanbul, Turkey
- Occupation: Cinematographer
- Years active: 2003–present
- Spouse: Begüm Bağca (m. 2020)

Gökhan Tiryaki (born 1972) is a Turkish cinematographer. He contributed to more than twenty films, including Once Upon a Time in Anatolia and Winter Sleep.
