= Grand Prix (Cannes Film Festival) =

Award given to feature films

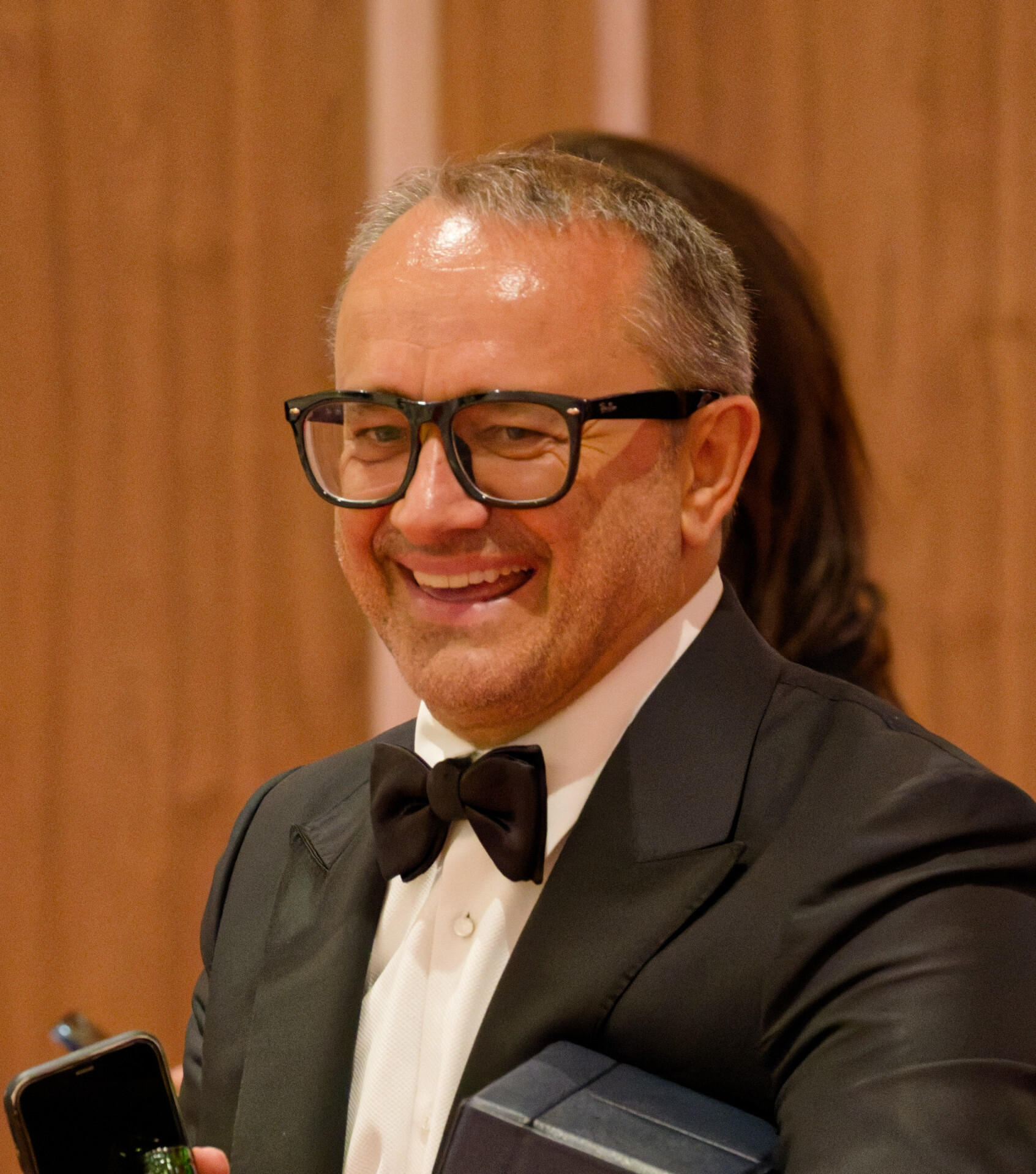
- 2026 recipient: Andrey Zvyagintsev
- Country: France
- Presented by: Cannes Film Festival
- First award: 1967
- Currently held by: Andrey Zvyagintsev for Minotaur (2026)
- Website: www.festival-cannes.com/en/

The Grand Prix is an award of the Cannes Film Festival bestowed by the jury of the festival on one of the competing feature films. It is the second-most prestigious prize of the festival after the Palme d'Or.

It most recent winner was the Russian filmmaker Andrey Zvyagintsev for Minotaur at the 2026 Cannes Film Festival.

== History ==
Prize official logo

The award was first presented in 1967. The prize was not awarded in 1977. The festival was not held at all in 2020. In 1968, no awards were given as the festival was called off mid-way due to the May 1968 events in France.

Also, the jury vote was tied, and the prize was shared by two films on 10 occasions (1967, 1971, 1976, 1978, 1989, 1990, 1994, 2011, and 2021–22). Andrei Tarkovsky, Bruno Dumont, Nuri Bilge Ceylan, and Matteo Garrone have won the most awards in this category, each winning twice. Three directing teams have shared the award: Paolo and Vittorio Taviani for The Night of the Shooting Stars (1982), Jean-Pierre and Luc Dardenne for The Kid with a Bike (2011), and Joel and Ethan Coen for Inside Llewyn Davis (2013). Márta Mészáros was the first woman to have won the award, for 1984's Diary for My Children.

Since 1995, the official name of the award has been simply the Grand Prix, but it has had two other names since its creation in 1967: the Grand Prix Spécial du Jury (1967–1988) and the Grand Prix du Jury (1989–1994).

In addition, the award should not be confused with the Grand Prix du Festival International du Film (1939–1954; 1964–1974), which was the highest prize of the festival and a precursor to the Palme d'Or.

== Winners ==
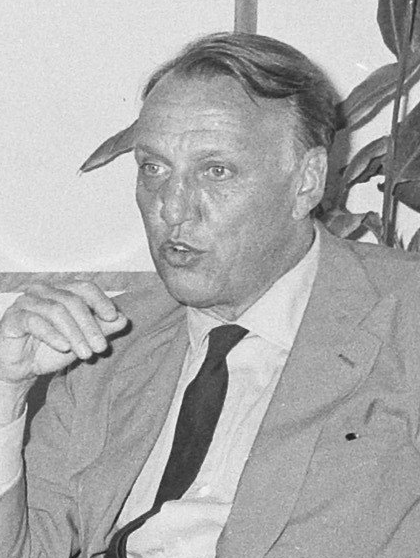
Joseph Losey won for Accident (1967)

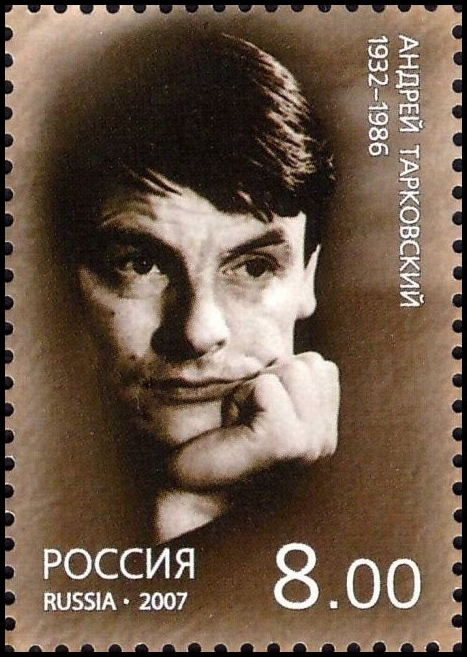
Andrei Tarkovsky won twice for Solaris (1972) and The Sacrifice (1986)

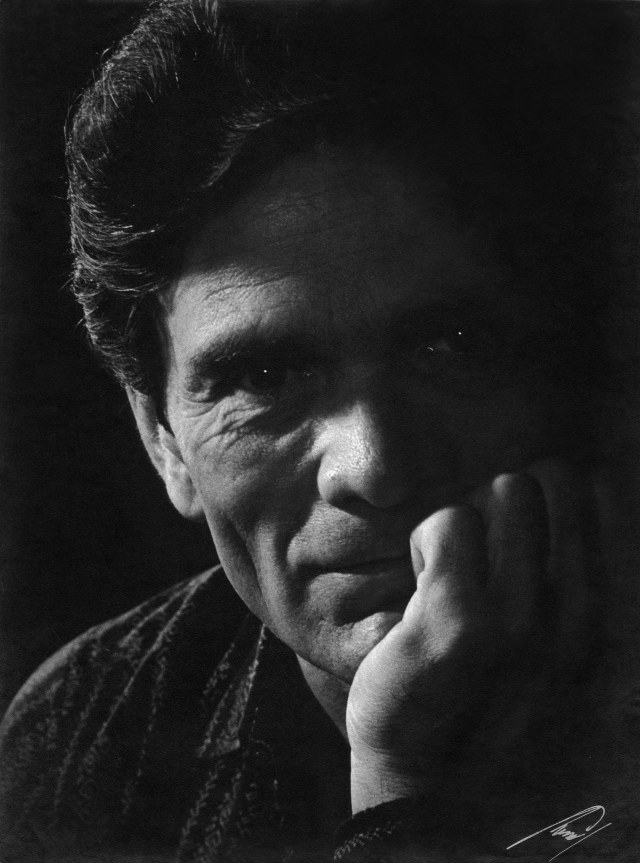
Pier Paolo Pasolini won for Arabian Nights (1974)

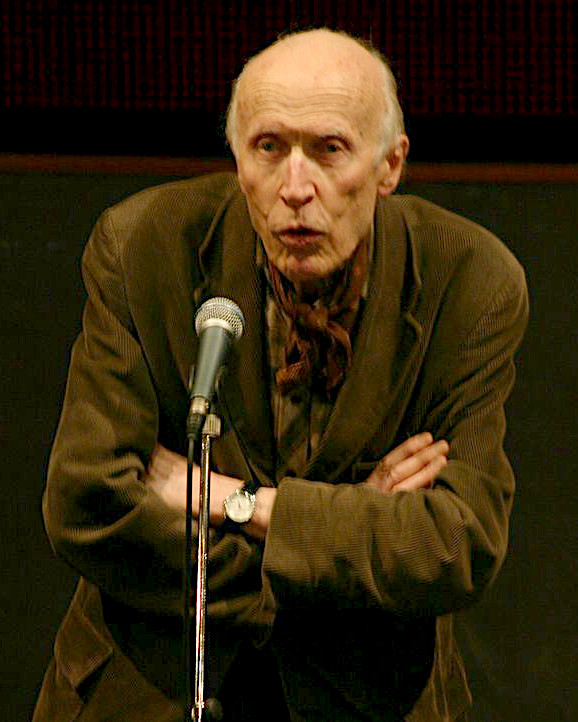
Éric Rohmer won for The Marquise of O (1976)

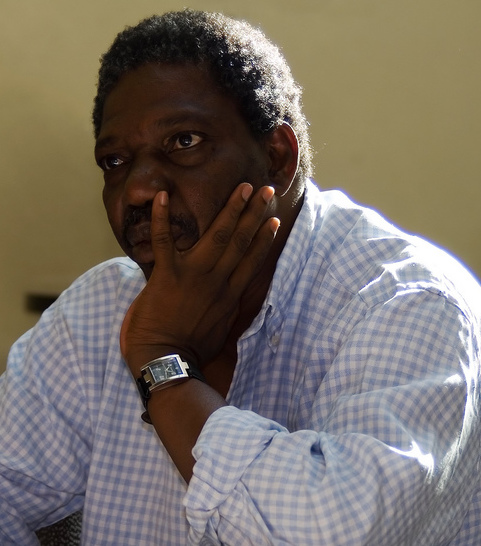
Idrissa Ouedraogo won for Tilaï (1990)

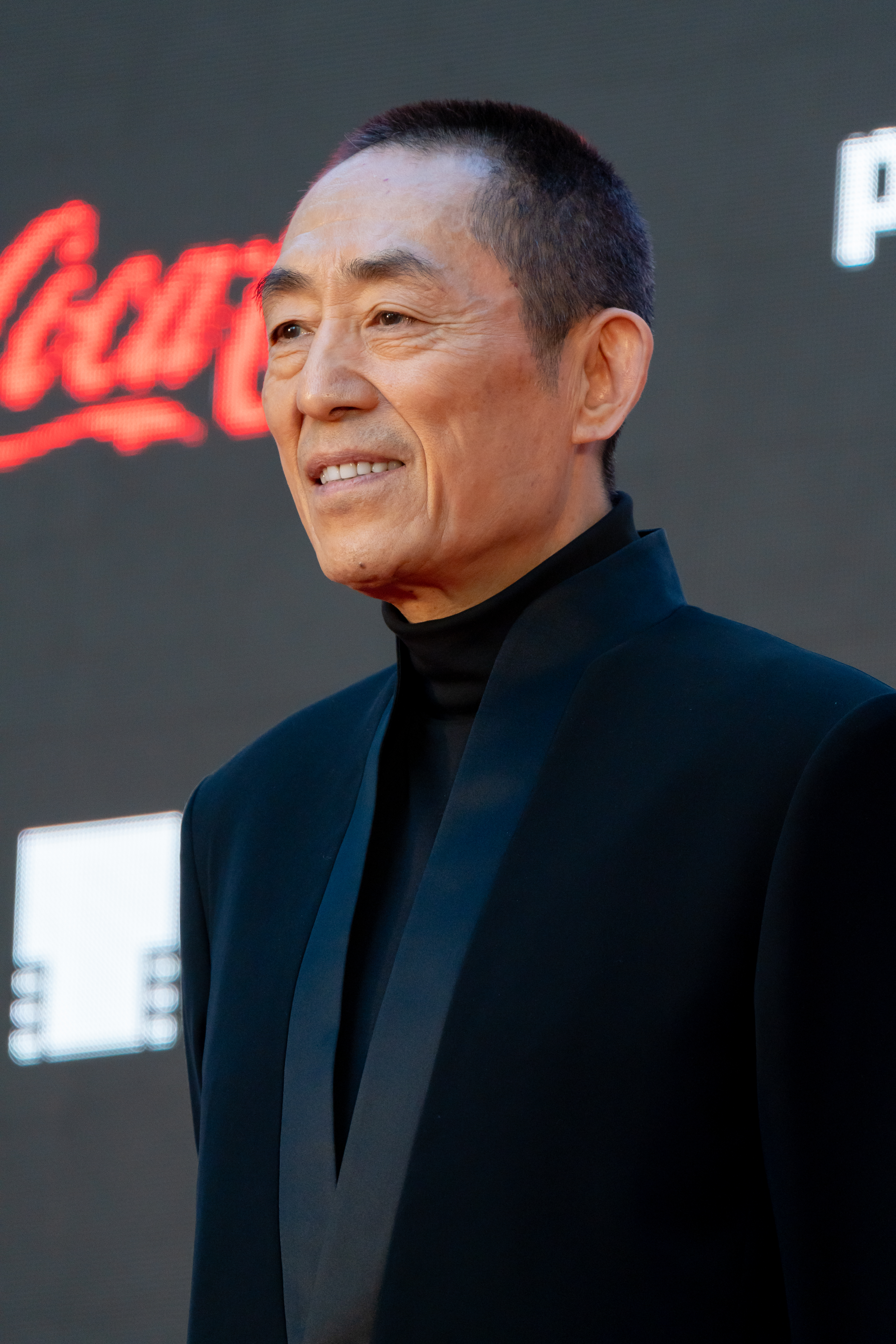
Zhang Yimou won for To Live (1994)

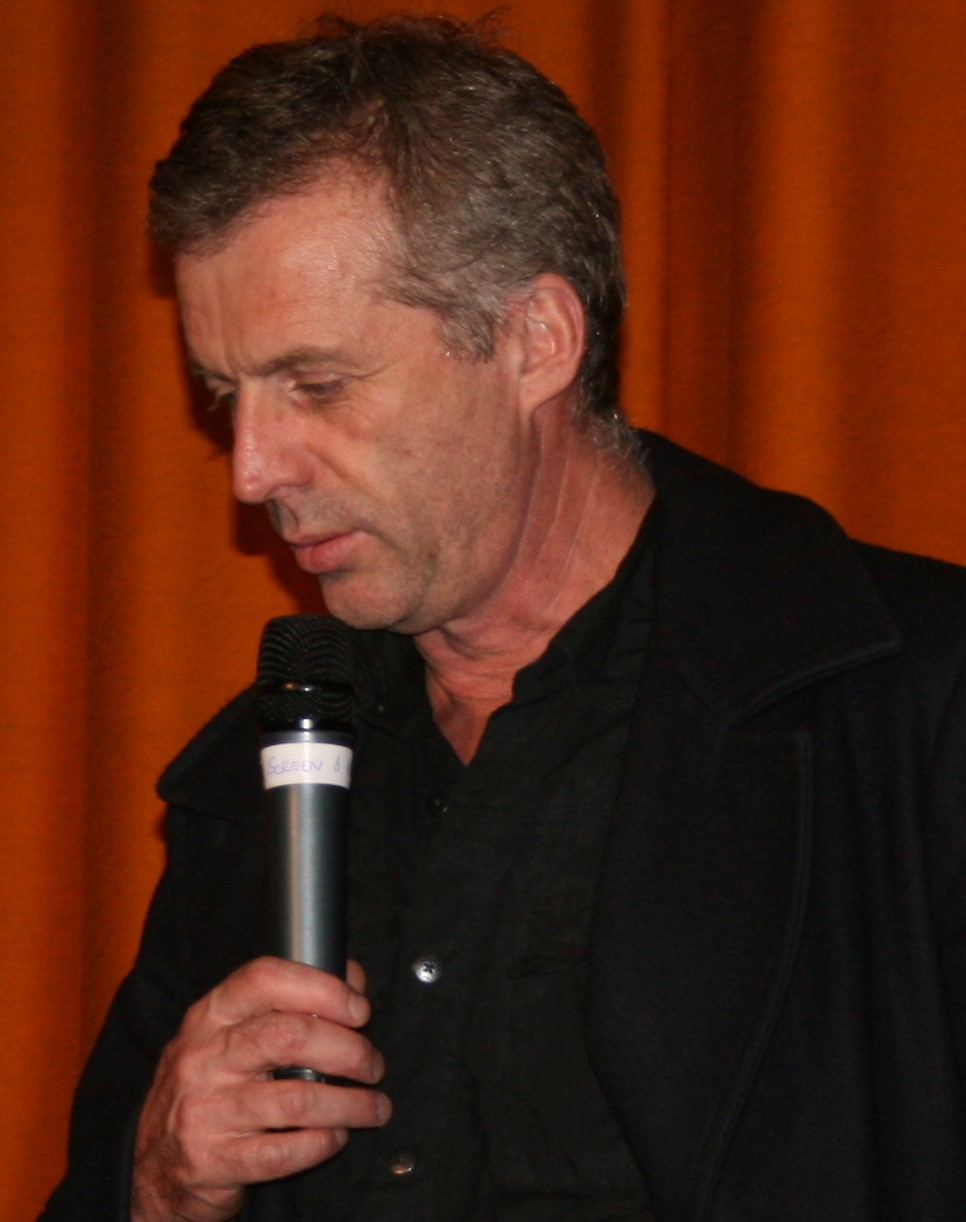
Bruno Dumont won twice for Humanité (1999) and Flanders (2006)

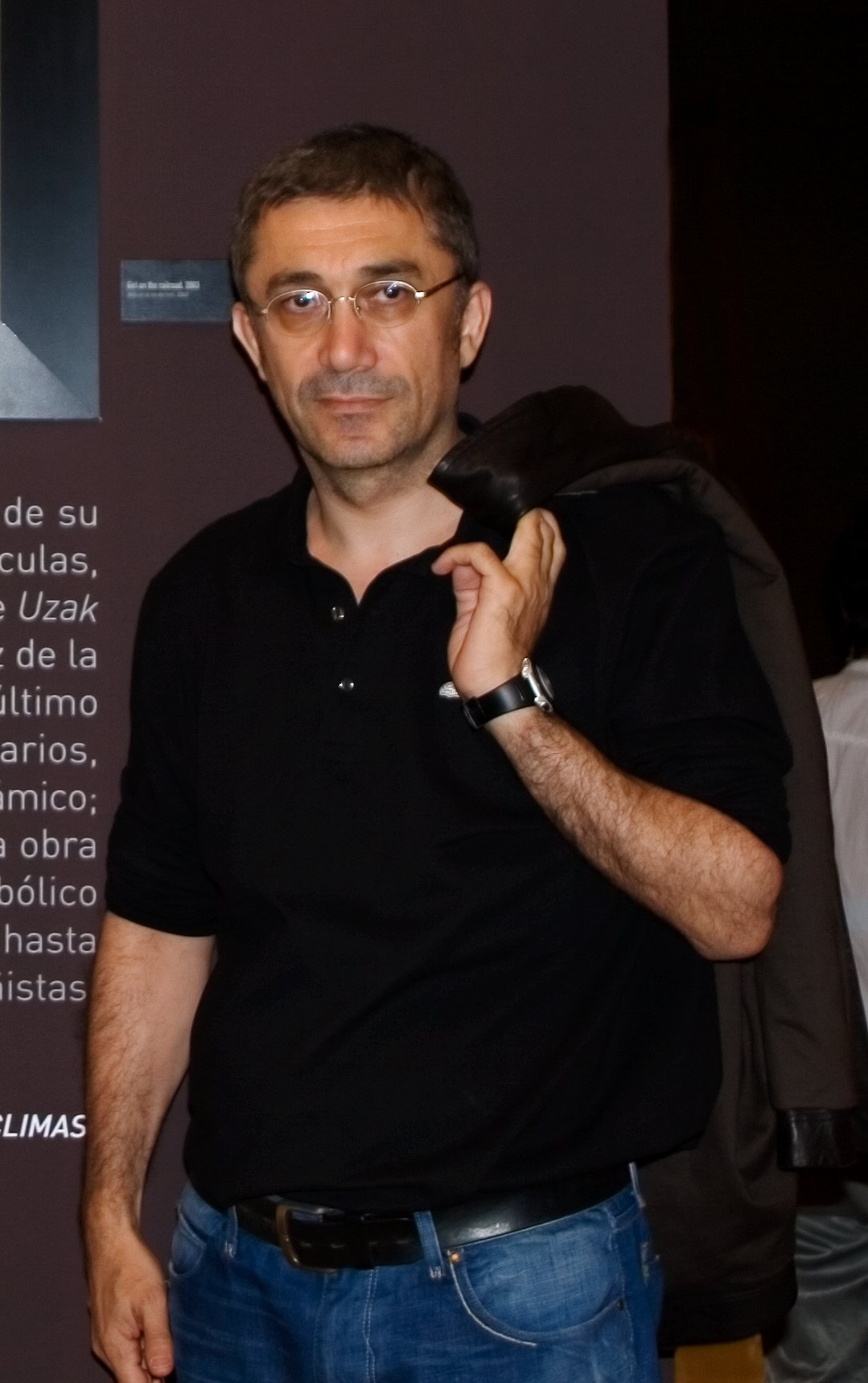
Nuri Bilge Ceylan won twice for Uzak (2003) and Once Upon a Time in Anatolia (2011)

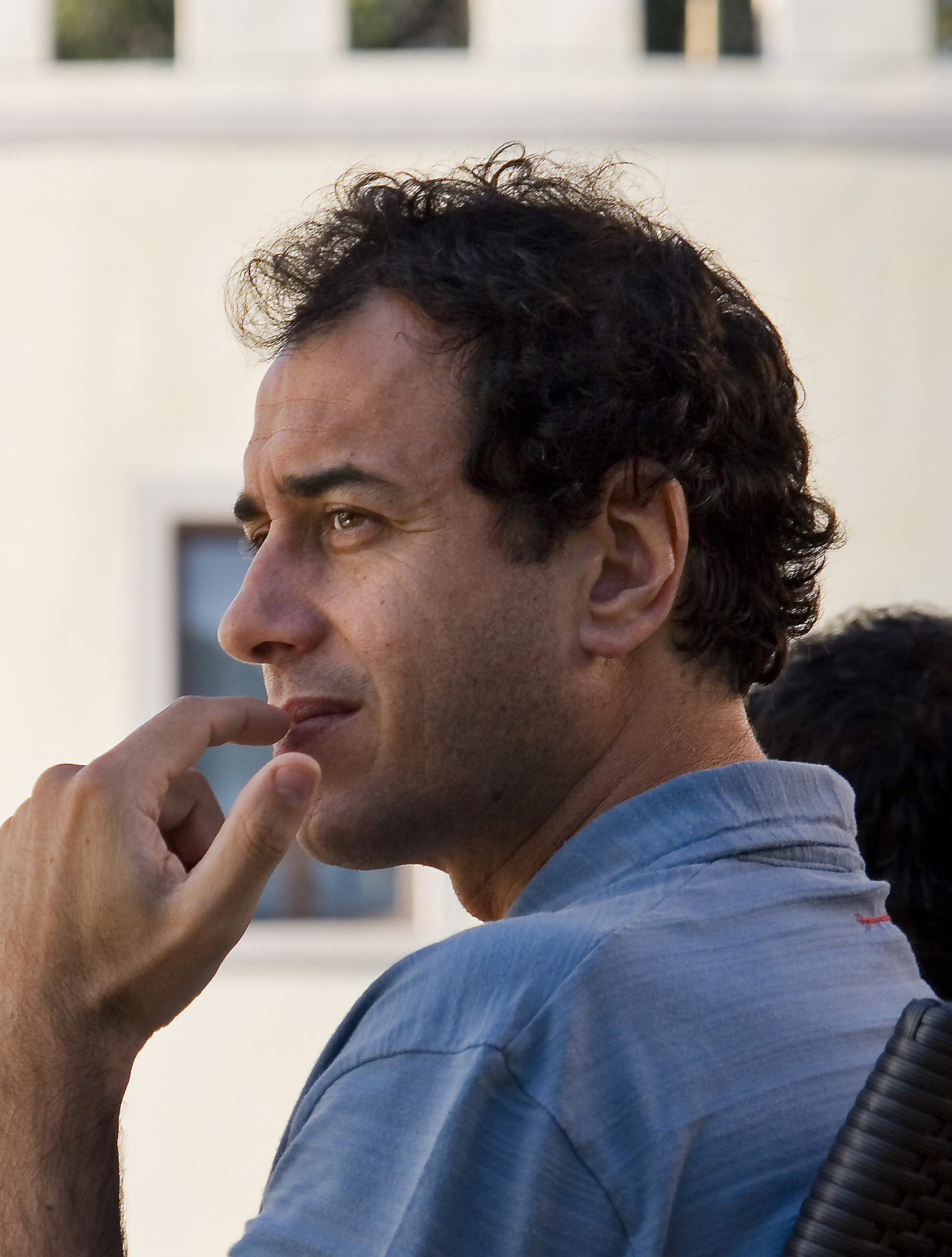
Matteo Garrone won twice for Gomorrah (2008) and Reality (2012)

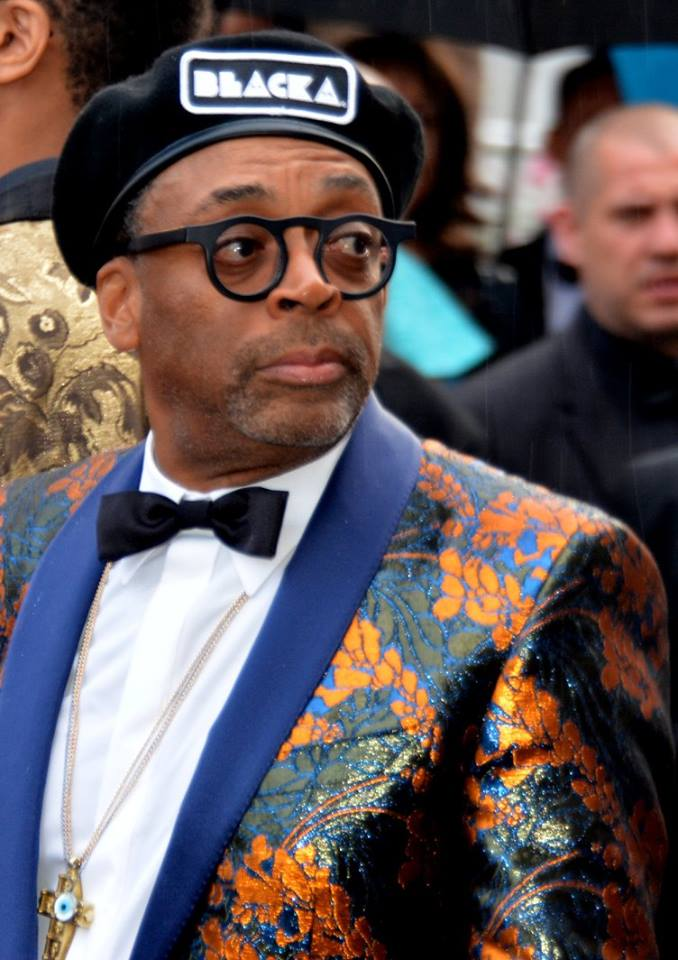
Spike Lee won for BlacKkKlansman (2018)

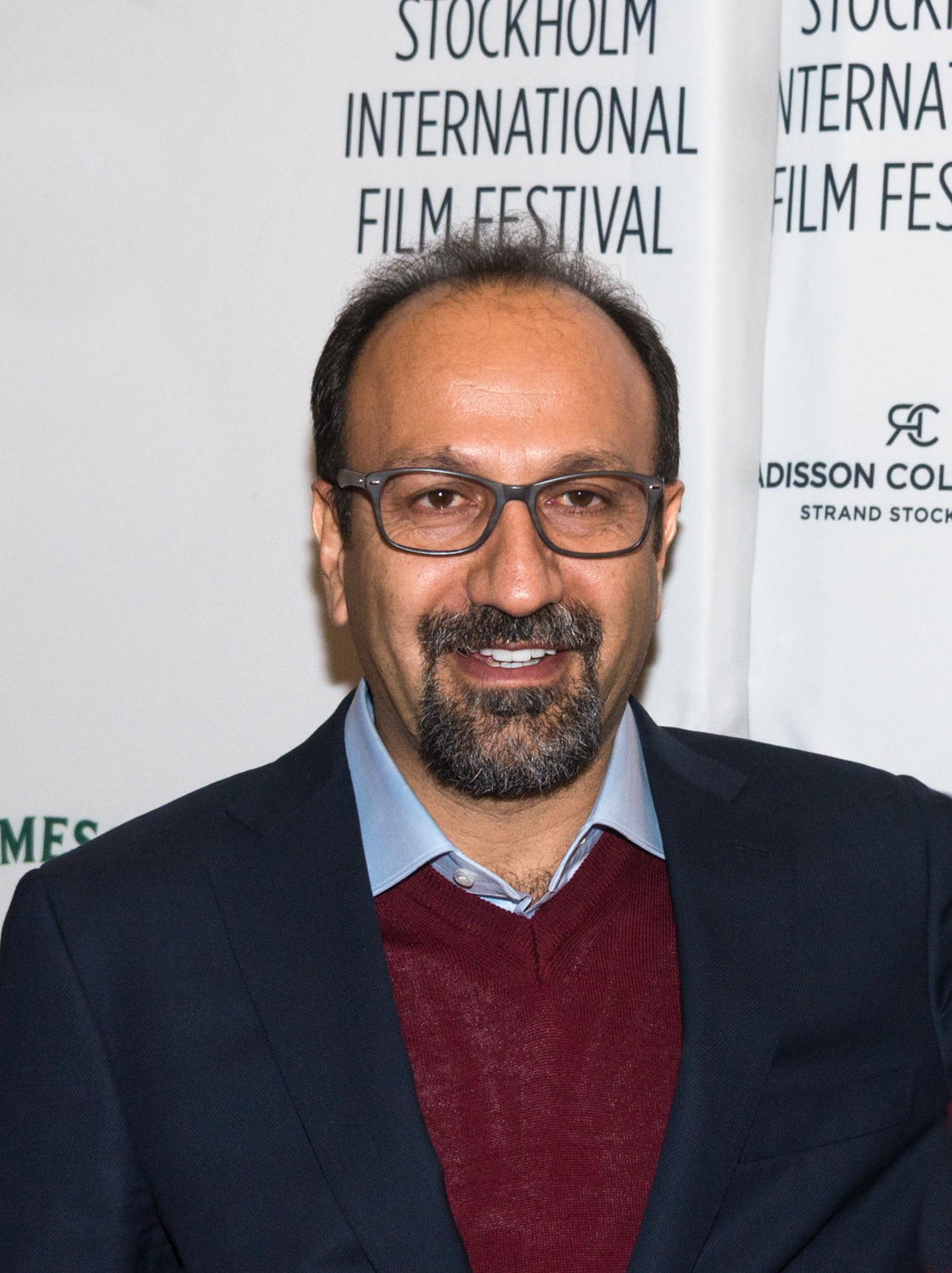
Asghar Farhadi won for A Hero (2021)

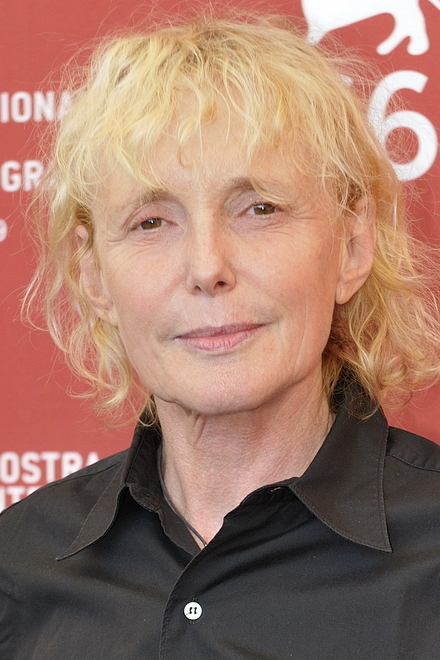
Claire Denis won for Stars at Noon (2022)

=== 1960s ===
| Year | English title | Original title | Director | Production country |
|---|---|---|---|---|
| 1967 | Accident | | Joseph Losey | United Kingdom |
| 1967 | I Even Met Happy Gypsies | Skupljači perja | Aleksandar Petrović | Yugoslavia |
| 1969 | Ådalen 31 | | Bo Widerberg | Sweden |

=== 1970s ===
| Year | English title | Original title | Director | Production country |
|---|---|---|---|---|
| 1970 | Investigation of a Citizen Above Suspicion | Indagine su un cittadino al di sopra di ogni sospetto | Elio Petri | Italy |
| 1971 | Johnny Got His Gun | | Dalton Trumbo | United States |
| 1971 | Taking Off | | Miloš Forman | United States |
| 1972 | Solaris | Солярис | Andrei Tarkovsky | Soviet Union |
| 1973 | The Mother and the Whore | La Maman et la putain | Jean Eustache | France |
| 1974 | Arabian Nights | Il fiore delle Mille e una notte | Pier Paolo Pasolini | Italy, France |
| 1975 | The Enigma of Kaspar Hauser | Jeder für sich und Gott gegen alle | Werner Herzog | West Germany |
| 1976 | Cría Cuervos | | Carlos Saura | Spain |
| 1976 | The Marquise of O | Die Marquise von O... | Éric Rohmer | France, West Germany |
| 1978 | Bye Bye Monkey | Ciao maschio | Marco Ferreri | Italy, France |
| 1978 | The Shout | | Jerzy Skolimowski | United Kingdom |
| 1979 | Siberiade | Сибириада | Andrei Konchalovsky | Soviet Union |

=== 1980s ===
| Year | English title | Original title | Director | Production country |
|---|---|---|---|---|
| 1980 | My American Uncle | Mon oncle d'Amérique | Alain Resnais | France |
| 1981 | Light Years Away | Les Années lumière | Alain Tanner | France, Switzerland |
| 1982 | The Night of the Shooting Stars | La Notte di San Lorenzo | Paolo and Vittorio Taviani | Italy |
| 1983 | Monty Python's The Meaning of Life | | Terry Jones | United Kingdom |
| 1984 | Diary for My Children | Napló gyermekeimnek | Márta Mészáros | Hungary |
| 1985 | Birdy | | Alan Parker | United States |
| 1986 | The Sacrifice | Offret | Andrei Tarkovsky | Sweden, France, United Kingdom |
| 1987 | Repentance | მონანიება | Tengiz Abuladze | Soviet Union |
| 1988 | A World Apart | | Chris Menges | United Kingdom, Zimbabwe |
| 1989 | Cinema Paradiso | Nuovo Cinema Paradiso | Giuseppe Tornatore | Italy |
| 1989 | Too Beautiful for You | Trop belle pour toi | Bertrand Blier | France |

=== 1990s ===
| Year | English title | Original title | Director | Production country |
|---|---|---|---|---|
| 1990 | The Sting of Death | 死の棘 | Kōhei Oguri | Japan |
| 1990 | Tilaï | | Idrissa Ouedraogo | Burkina Faso, Switzerland, France, Germany, United Kingdom |
| 1991 | La Belle Noiseuse | | Jacques Rivette | France, Switzerland |
| 1992 | The Stolen Children | Il Ladro di bambini | Gianni Amelio | Italy |
| 1993 | Faraway, So Close! | In weiter Ferne, so nah! | Wim Wenders | Germany |
| 1994 | Burnt by the Sun | Утомлённые солнцем | Nikita Mikhalkov | Russia, France |
| 1994 | To Live | 活着 | Zhang Yimou | Hongkong |
| 1995 | Ulysses' Gaze | To Vlemma tou Odyssea | Theo Angelopoulos | Greece |
| 1996 | Breaking the Waves | | Lars von Trier | Denmark, United Kingdom |
| 1997 | The Sweet Hereafter | | Atom Egoyan | Canada |
| 1998 | Life Is Beautiful | La vita è bella | Roberto Benigni | Italy |
| 1999 | Humanité | | Bruno Dumont | France |

=== 2000s ===
| Year | English title | Original title | Director | Production country |
|---|---|---|---|---|
| 2000 | Devils on the Doorstep | 鬼子来了 | Jiang Wen | China |
| 2001 | The Piano Teacher | La Pianiste | Michael Haneke | France, Austria, Germany |
| 2002 | The Man Without a Past | Mies vailla menneisyyttä | Aki Kaurismäki | Finland |
| 2003 | Uzak | | Nuri Bilge Ceylan | Turkey |
| 2004 | Oldboy | 올드보이 | Park Chan-wook | South Korea |
| 2005 | Broken Flowers | | Jim Jarmusch | France, United States |
| 2006 | Flanders | | Bruno Dumont | France |
| 2007 | The Mourning Forest | 殯の森 | Naomi Kawase | Japan |
| 2008 | Gomorrah | Gomorra | Matteo Garrone | Italy |
| 2009 | A Prophet | Un prophète | Jacques Audiard | France |

=== 2010s ===
| Year | English title | Original title | Director | Production country |
|---|---|---|---|---|
| 2010 | Of Gods and Men | Des hommes et des dieux | Xavier Beauvois | France |
| 2011 | The Kid with a Bike | Le Gamin au vélo | Dardenne brothers | Belgium, France |
| 2011 | Once Upon a Time in Anatolia | Bir Zamanlar Anadolu'da | Nuri Bilge Ceylan | Turkey, Bosnia and Herzegovina |
| 2012 | Reality | | Matteo Garrone | Italy, France |
| 2013 | Inside Llewyn Davis | | Joel & Ethan Coen | United States, United Kingdom, France |
| 2014 | The Wonders | Le meraviglie | Alice Rohrwacher | Italy, Switzerland, Germany |
| 2015 | Son of Saul | Saul fia | László Nemes | Hungary |
| 2016 | It's Only the End of the World | Juste la fin du monde | Xavier Dolan | Canada, France |
| 2017 | BPM (Beats per Minute) | 120 battements par minute | Robin Campillo | France |
| 2018 | BlacKkKlansman | | Spike Lee | United States |
| 2019 | Atlantics | Atlantique | Mati Diop | France, Senegal, Belgium |

=== 2020s ===
| Year | English title | Original title | Director | Production country |
|---|---|---|---|---|
| 2021 | Compartment No. 6 | Hytti nro 6 | Juho Kuosmanen | Finland, Germany, Estonia, Russia |
| 2021 | A Hero | قهرمان | Asghar Farhadi | Iran, France |
| 2022 | Close | | Lukas Dhont | Belgium, Netherlands, France |
| 2022 | Stars at Noon | | Claire Denis | France |
| 2023 | The Zone of Interest | | Jonathan Glazer | United Kingdom, Poland |
| 2024 | All We Imagine as Light | പ്രഭയായ് നിനച്ചതെല്ലം | Payal Kapadia | India, France, Italy, Netherlands, Luxembourg |
| 2025 | Sentimental Value | Affeksjonsverdi | Joachim Trier | Norway, France, Germany, Denmark, Sweden, United Kingdom |
| 2026 | Minotaur | Минотавр | Andrey Zvyagintsev | France, Latvia, Germany |

== Multiple winners ==
The following individuals received two or more Grand Prix awards:

| Number of Wins | Directors | Nationality | Films | Ref(s) |
|---|---|---|---|---|
| 2 | Andrei Tarkovsky | Soviet Union | Solaris (1972), The Sacrifice (1986) | |
| 2 | Bruno Dumont | France | Humanité (1999), Flanders (2006) | |
| 2 | Nuri Bilge Ceylan | Turkey | Uzak (2003), Once Upon a Time in Anatolia (2011) | |
| 2 | Matteo Garrone | Italy | Gomorrah (2008), Reality (2012) | |

== See also ==
- Palme d'Or
- Jury Prize (third place)
