= Nuri Bilge Ceylan =

Turkish film director, screenwriter, film producer and photographer (born 1959)

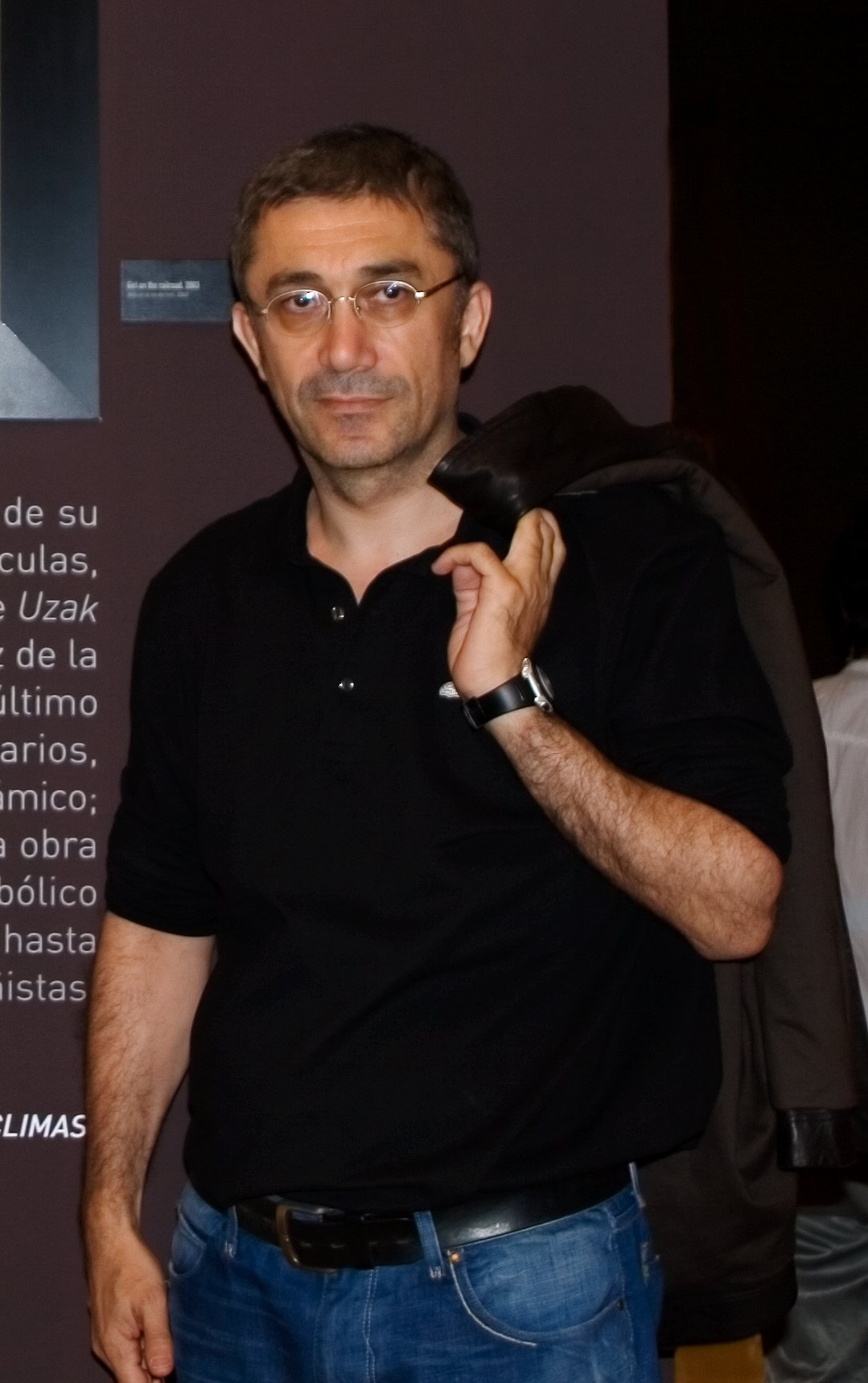
- Ceylan in 2009
- Born: 26 January 1959 (age 67); Istanbul, Turkey
- Education: Boğaziçi University; Mimar Sinan University
- Occupations: Film director, photographer
- Years active: 1995–present
- Spouse(s): Aylin Ünaldı Ceylan; Ebru Ceylan (2003–present)
- Relatives: Mehmet Emin Toprak (cousin)
- Awards: Full list

Nuri Bilge Ceylan (Turkish: [ˈnuːɾi ˈbilɟe ˈdʒejlan]; born 26 January 1959) is a Turkish filmmaker and actor. His films usually explore Turkish society in the 21st century, featuring long takes and lengthy runtime.

His drama film Winter Sleep (2014) won the Palme d'Or at the 67th Cannes Film Festival, while six of his nine feature films have been selected as Turkey's submission for the Academy Award for Best International Feature Film.

== Early life and education ==
Ceylan was born in Bakırköy, Istanbul, Turkey on 26 January 1959, to Mehmet Emin Ceylan, an agricultural engineer, and Fatma Ceylan. Ceylan spent most of his childhood in his father's hometown of Yenice, Çanakkale. He completed his primary education in Yenice before finishing high school in Istanbul. In 1976, Ceylan started studying chemistry at Istanbul Technical University; in 1978, he transferred to Boğaziçi University in order to study electrical engineering.

During his time at Boğaziçi University, Ceylan began to receive recognition for his work as a photographer; in 1982, he was featured in an article in the arts and culture magazine Milliyet Sanat on young Turkish photographers. During the 1980s, photographs by Ceylan were featured in magazines including Gergedan; in 1989, he won a national competition to represent Turkey at an international event organised by Kodak, and took part in shoots in London and Kathmandu. After returning to Turkey, he completed military service in Mamak, Ankara. After completing his military service, Ceylan studied film at Mimar Sinan University.

== Career ==
=== 1990s ===
In 1993, he acted in Mehmet Eryılmaz's short film Seviyorum Ergo Sum, where he also helped with the film's production. After the production of Seviyorum Ergo Sum, Ceylan bought the camera used to film it and subsequently used it in the production of his own short film, Cocoon (Koza). Which became the first Turkish short film to be screened at the 48th Cannes Film Festival in 1995.

Ceylan's first feature film Kasaba (1997) screened at various international film festivals including the 47th Berlin International Film Festival. The film, which has been called the first in Ceylan's "provincial trilogy" (Turkish: "taşra üçlemesi") of films,alongside Mayıs Sıkıntısı and Uzak, has also been considered a sequel to Koza. Ceylan assumed much of the production roles, including screenwriting and cinematography in addition to directing; it also features a cast consisting primarily of his family members.

Ceylan's sophomore film Clouds of May (1999) screened in competition at the 50th Berlin International Film Festival, starring his own father Emin Ceylan.

=== 2000s ===
Uzak (2002) had its international premiere at the main competition of the 56th Cannes Film Festival, where it won the Grand Prix (second place), while its stars Muzaffer Özdemir and Mehmet Emin Toprak (who died shortly after the film's production) were jointly awarded the Best Actor prize. The film received positive reviews. A novelisation was published in 2004.

Climates (2006) premiered at the main competition of the 59th Cannes Film Festival, where it won the FIPRESCI Prize. Co-starred by Ceylan and his wife Ebru Ceylan, it marked the first production he did not work as cinematographer and producer.

His thriller drama film Three Monkeys (2008) marked his first collaboration with professional actors. The film premiered at the main competition of the 61st Cannes Film Festival, where it won the Best Director. It was selected as the Turkey's submission for Best International Feature Film at the 81st Academy Awards, and was shortlisted among nine semi-finalists, although was not ultimately nominated. One year later, Ceylan served as a member of the main competition jury of the 2009 Cannes Film Festival.

=== 2010s ===
His crime drama film Once Upon a Time in Anatolia (2011) premiered at the main competition of the 64th Cannes Film Festival, where Ceylan won for a second time the Grand Prix (second place), alongside Dardenne brothers' The Kid with a Bike. It received widespread critical acclaim. Critic Roger Ebert praised the director, writing: "The Turkish director doesn't slap us with big dramatic moments, but allows us to live along with his characters as things occur to them". At the 25th European Film Awards, Ceylan received his first nomination for the European Film Award for Best Director.

Winter Sleep (2014) premiered at the main competition of the 67th Cannes Film Festival, where it won the Palme d'Or, becoming the first Turkish film to win the prize since Yol in 1982. Peter Bradshaw of The Guardian described the film as "chilly but touching" adding, "[it's] a huge, sombre and compelling tragicomedy set in Turkey's vast Anatolian steppe".

His drama film The Wild Pear Tree (2018) premiered at the main competition of the 71st Cannes Film Festival. The film is a character study involving a writer who returns to his hometown after graduating, where he seeks sponsors to publish his book while dealing with his father's deteriorating indulgence into gambling. Pat Brown of Slant Magazine praised it as a "rich, textured film, [which] is ostensibly about patrimony—namely, what sons inherit from and owe to their fathers. In many ways it's a coming-of-age story, featuring a protagonist whose immature callousness gradually gives way to a more mature openness to his family".

=== 2020s ===
After a small hiatus, Ceylan returned with About Dry Grasses (2023), which premiered at the main competition of the 76th Cannes Film Festival, where Merve Dizdar won the Best Actress award. The film involves a young teacher hoping to be appointed to Istanbul after mandatory duty at a small village. Siddhant Adlakha of IndieWire wrote of the film: "Your mileage may vary, but 'About Dry Grasses' is among the most brilliantly off-putting works to be featured at Cannes in recent years, with so rotten a core that every hint of virtue or even normalcy in the camera's peripheral vision becomes a tragedy unto itself, simply by way of being ignored."

==== Upcoming projects ====
In 2026, Ceylan started shooting Pale Sun (Yorgun Günes), starring Pınar Deniz and Altan Erkekli. Filming took place in Istanbul and Assos. The film follows Sabri, who travels from Ankara to his daughter, Defne, home in the seaside.

== Styles and themes ==
Recurring themes in Ceylan's films include estrangement, existentialism, monotony, and the human experience. He often features static shots and long takes, usually in natural settings and without the use of staged sets. Ceylan's use of sound includes using silence to cause unease. He has been noted for filming his protagonists from behind, which he has stated is in order to leave the audience speculating on their motives and emotions. Ceylan's earlier films were made on low budgets with casts consisting primarily of amateur actors, often family members and neighbours of Ceylan himself.

=== Influences ===
In Sight and Sound's 2012 poll of the world's greatest films, Ceylan named his ten favorite films as being Andrei Rublev (1966), Au hasard Balthazar (1966), L'Avventura (1960), L'Eclisse (1962), Late Spring (1949), A Man Escaped (1956), Mirror (1975), Scenes from a Marriage (1973), Shame (1968), and Tokyo Story (1953).

== Personal life ==
Ceylan is married to filmmaker, photographer and actress Ebru Ceylan, the couple co-starred in Climates.

== Filmography ==
Year	Title	Original title	Notes
1995	Cocoon	Koza	Short film
1997	The Small Town	Kasaba	
1999	Clouds of May	Mayıs Sıkıntısı	
2002	Distant	Uzak	
2006	Climates	İklimler	Also actor
2008	Three Monkeys	Üç Maymun	
2011	Once Upon a Time in Anatolia	Bir Zamanlar Anadolu'da	
2014	Winter Sleep	Kış Uykusu	
2018	The Wild Pear Tree	Ahlat Ağacı	
2023	About Dry Grasses	Kuru Otlar Üstüne	
TBA	Pale Sun	Yorgun Günes	Post-production

== Accolades ==
- FIPRESCI Award (1997 – Kasaba ("Small Town" or "The Town"), 2000 – Clouds of May, 2006 – Iklimler ("Climates")), 2014 – Winter Sleep
- Golden Orange Award for Best Director (1999 – Clouds of May, 2002 – Uzak (Distant), 2006 – Iklimler ("Climates"))
- Golden Orange Award for Best Screenplay (2002 – Uzak ("Distant"))
- Grand Jury Prize / Grand Prix at Cannes Film Festival (2002 – Uzak ("Distant"), 2011 – Once Upon a Time in Anatolia)
- Cannes Film Festival Best Director Award (2008 - Three Monkeys)
- Asia Pacific Screen Award for Best Director (2008 – Üç Maymun ("Three Monkeys"), 2011 – Once Upon a Time in Anatolia, 2014 – Winter Sleep
- Palme d'Or (2014 - "Winter Sleep")

Ceylan has also received an honorary PhD from Boğaziçi University, his alma mater.
