= Muzaffer Özdemir =

Turkish actor (born 1955)

Muzaffer Özdemir (born 1955 in Gümüşhane) is a Turkish actor. He is best known for his performance as Mahmut in Uzak.

== Awards ==
- Best actor at Cannes Film Festival (2003)
