= Uzak =

2002 Turkish film

- International promotional poster
- Directed by: Nuri Bilge Ceylan
- Written by: Nuri Bilge Ceylan
- Produced by: Nuri Bilge Ceylan
- Starring: Muzaffer Özdemir; Mehmet Emin Toprak
- Cinematography: Nuri Bilge Ceylan
- Edited by: Ayhan Ergürsel; Nuri Bilge Ceylan
- Production company: NBC Film
- Distributed by: Özen Film
- Release dates: October 2002 (Antalya); 20 December 2002 (Turkey); 17 May 2003 (Cannes)
- Running time: 110 minutes
- Country: Turkey
- Language: Turkish
- Box office: $766,669

Uzak (pronounced [uˈzac], Distant in North America) is a 2002 Turkish drama film written, produced, co-edit, shot and directed by Nuri Bilge Ceylan. Starring Muzaffer Özdemir and Mehmet Emin Toprak (in his final acting credit), it follows Yusuf, an illiterate unemployed young man, who travels to Istanbul to stay with his relative, Mahmut.

The film was theatrically released in Turkey in 20 December 2002, followed by its international release at the 2003 Cannes Film Festival, where it won the Grand Prix and the Best Actor award for Özdemir and Toprak. It was Turkey's official submission for the Academy Award for Best Foreign Language Film at the 77th Academy Awards, but it was not nominated.

== Plot ==
Yusuf, a young factory worker who recently lost his job, travels to Istanbul to stay with Mahmut, one of his relatives, while looking for a job. Mahmut is a rather wealthy and intellectual photographer, whereas Yusuf is almost illiterate, uneducated, and unsophisticated. The two do not get along well. Yusuf assumes that he will easily find work as a sailor but there are no jobs, and he has no sense of direction or energy. Meanwhile, Mahmut, despite his wealth, is aimless too: his job, which consists of photographing tiles, is dull and inartistic; he can barely express emotions towards his ex-wife or his lover. When Yusuf goes to bed during a film, Mahmut switches channels to watch porn the moment he's gone.

Mahmut attempts to bond with Yusuf and recapture his love of art by taking him on a drive to photograph the beautiful Turkish countryside, but the attempt is a failure on both counts. At the end of the film, Yusuf leaves without telling Mahmut, who is left to sit by the docks, watching the ships on his own.

== Cast ==
- Muzaffer Özdemir as Mahmut
- Mehmet Emin Toprak as Yusuf
- Zuhal Gencer as Nazan (credited as Zuhal Gencer Erkaya)
- Nazan Kırılmış as Lover
- Feridun Koç as Janitor
- Fatma Ceylan as Mother

== Production ==
Ceylan made the film with a team of 5 people, and stated that he found the body of a French teacher on the upper floor of the apartment where he lived, thus he was very affected by this incident and included it in the film.

Uzak was the last film that the actor Mehmet Emin Toprak would be involved with, as he died in a car accident soon after filming was completed. He was 28 years old.

== Reception ==
=== Critical response ===
Distant has been acclaimed by critics. On Rotten Tomatoes, the film has an approval rating of 87%, based on 46 reviews, with an average rating of 7.8/10. The site's critical consensus reads, "Hauntingly beautiful, Distant communicates volumes with its almost pervasive silence." On Metacritic, the film has an average score of 84 out of 100, based on 18 critics, indicating "universal acclaim".

Tom Dawson of BBC describes the film as "richly contemplative and languid filmmaking" and added "Few recent films have been so accomplished in capturing the way people drift through their lives, unable to communicate their emotions and feelings." David Sterritt of The Christian Science Monitor describes it as an "unassuming, acutely observant drama."

=== Awards, Nominations and Honours ===
Uzak won 17 awards and 2 nominations, including the Grand Prix and Prix d'interprétation masculine, shared by the two lead actors of the film at the 2003 Cannes Film Festival.

In 2019, director Andrew Haigh named it as the best film of the 21st century, praising it as "one of the best about loneliness ever made."

== See also ==
- List of submissions to the 77th Academy Awards for Best Foreign Language Film
- List of Turkish submissions for the Academy Award for Best Foreign Language Film
