= Valley of the Wolves (disambiguation) =

Valley of the Wolves may refer to the Turkish media franchise consisting of:

== Television ==
- Valley of the Wolves (TV series) (Turkish: Kurtlar Vadisi); the original 2003 series created by Osman Sınav.
- Valley of the Wolves: Terror (Turkish: Kurtlar Vadisi: Terör); the short-lived 2007 spin-off series.
- Valley of the Wolves:Ambush (Turkish: Kurtlar Vadisi: Pusu); the second 2007 spin-off series.

== Film ==
- Valley of the Wolves: Iraq (Turkish: Kurtlar Vadisi: Irak); the controversial 2006 spin-off film directed by Serdar Akar.
- Valley of the Wolves: Gladio (Turkish: Kurtlar Vadisi: Gladio); the 2009 spin-off film directed by Sadullah Şentürk.
- Valley of the Wolves: Palestine (Turkish: Kurtlar Vadisi: Filistin); the up-coming 2010 spin-off film directed by Sadullah Şentürk.
