= Kim Milyoner Olmak İster? =

- Presented by: Kenan Işık (2011–2014); Various celebrities (2014); Selçuk Yöntem (2014–2017); Murat Yıldırım (2017–2019); Kenan İmirzalıoğlu (2019–2024); Oktay Kaynarca (2024–2026); Cem Öğretir (2026–)
- Country of origin: Turkey
- Original language: Turkish
- No. of seasons: 14
- No. of episodes: 1251

Production
- Running time: 180 minutes
- Production company: Sera Film Services

Original release
- Network: ATV
- Release: 2 August 2011 – present

Related
- Kim 1 Milyon İster? (2008); Kim 500 Bin İster? (2005-2006); Kim 500 Milyar İster? (2000-2004)

Kim Milyoner Olmak İster? (English translation: Who Wants to Be a Millionaire?) is a Turkish game show based on the original British format of Who Wants to Be a Millionaire?. The program was broadcast from August 2, 2011 and it is shown on ATV.

The main goal of the game is to win ₺10,000,000 (₺1,000,000 until 2023; ₺5,000,000 from 2023 to 2026) by answering 15 (12 until 2023; 13 from 2023 to 2026) multiple choice questions correctly. There are four lifelines: Phone a Friend, Ask the Audience, 50/50 and Double Dip. If a contestant answers incorrectly before the first guaranteed sum (located at question 2 until 2026, and at question 5 since then), the contestant walks away with absolutely nothing. During the game, the contestant can walk away with the money they earned in the game, thus ending the game.

This version does not have Fastest Finger First round and the host will invite each contestants to the studio, and also uses a modified version of the clock format first used in the UK version. Contestants have a 15-second time-limit for each of the first five (two until 2026) questions and then a 45-second time-limit for each of the next five questions. After answering the 10th (7th until 2026) question correctly, the clock is removed and there is no time limit to answer the last five (six from 2023 to 2026) questions. If the contestant fails to give a final answer when the time expires, it will be treated as if a wrong answer was given by the contestant.

== Payout structure ==
Payout structure
Question number	Question value			
Question number	2011–2021	2021–2023	2023–2026	2026–
1	₺500	₺1,000	₺2,000	
2	₺1,000	₺2,000	₺5,000	₺5,000
3	₺2,000	₺3,000	₺7,500	
4	₺3,000	₺5,000	₺10,000	
5	₺5,000	₺7,500	₺20,000	₺20,000
6	₺7,500	₺10,000	₺30,000	
7	₺15,000	₺30,000	₺50,000	₺50,000
8	₺30,000	₺50,000	₺100,000	
9	₺60,000	₺100,000	₺200,000	
10	₺125,000	₺200,000	₺300,000	₺300,000
11	₺250,000	₺400,000	₺500,000	
12	₺1,000,000		₺1,000,000	
13	—N/a		₺5,000,000	₺2,000,000
14	—N/a		—N/a	₺4,000,000
15	—N/a		—N/a	₺10,000,000

== Lifelines ==
Using a lifeline (referred to in this version as a "joker") temporarily pauses the question's timer.

- Phone a Friend (Telefon): The contestant selects one of their three friends to call. The contestants have 30 seconds to read the question and the options to their friend. Also, friends have 30 seconds to answer the question on the phone given to them by contestants.
- Ask the Audience (Seyirciye sorma): The contestant asks the studio audience which answer they believe is correct. Members of the studio audience indicate their choices using an audience response system and audience have 10 seconds to do. The results are immediately displayed on the contestant's and host's screens. This is a popular lifeline, known for its near-perfect accuracy. This lifeline was temporarily suspended by the COVID-19 pandemic.
- 50:50 (Yarı yarıya): Computer eliminates two wrong answers randomly.
- Double Dip (Çift cevap): The contestant can give two answers for a question; but, contestants can't walk away or use any other lifelines after selecting it. This lifeline is available to the contestant after answering 7th question correctly. If the contestant had used 50:50 and then decides to use Double Dip, the contestant is guaranteed to get the correct answer for the question.
- Ask the Expert (Uzmana sorma). The contestant turns to an invited expert (Arda Ayten) who can help answer the question. The lifeline briefly replaced the "Ask the Audience" in 2020 during the early phases of the COVID-19 pandemic.

== Top prize winners ==
- Arda Ayten – ₺1,000,000 (5 October 2019)
- Rabia Birsen Göğercin – ₺1,000,000 (10 September 2023)
- Berk Göktaş – ₺5,000,000 (24 March 2024)
