= Selin Demiratar =

Turkish actress

- Born: 20 March 1983 (age 42); Erzincan, Turkey
- Education: Mimar Sinan University
- Occupation: Actress
- Years active: 2001–2014
- Spouse: Mehmet Ali Çebi (m. 2020)
- Website: Official website

Selin Demiratar (born 20 March 1983) is a Turkish actress.

== Biography ==
Selin Demiratar was born in 1983 in Erzincan. She first explored acting at the Antalya Municipal Theatre.

In 1999, she won the Miss Globe Turkey beauty pageant and finished in third place at Miss Globe World. After moving to Istanbul, she started her professional acting career with a role in the series 90-60-90. She became popular in Turkey following her appearance in Acı Hayat alongside Kenan İmirzalıoğlu. She was cast in the popular youth series "Lise Defteri" and "Koçum Benim". She played in hit comedy crime series "Adanalı" alongside Oktay Kaynarca, Serenay Sarıkaya.

== Filmography ==
Film
Year	Title	Role	Notes
2002	Abdülhamit Düşerken	Ayşe Sultan	
2005	Şaşkın	Pelin	
2007	O Kadın	Yeşim	
2012	Patlak Sokaklar: Gerzomat	Jennifer	
Television
Year	Title	Role	Notles
2001	90-60-90	Burcu	
2002–2004	Koçum Benim	Eylül	
2003–2004	Lise Defteri	Güney Esen	
2004	Sular Durulmuyor	Gülçin	
2005–2007	Acı Hayat	Nermin Yıldız	
2008	Dur Yolcu	Ayşe	
2008	Gazi	Tuna	
2008–2010	Adanalı	İdil Ertürk	
2010	Haneler	Kendisi	
2011	Şüphe	İpek	
2012–2014	Huzur Sokağı	Feyza	
