= Valley of the Wolves: Palestine =

- Theatrical release poster
- Directed by: Zübeyr Şaşmaz
- Written by: Cüneyt Aysan; Bahadır Özdener; Raci Şaşmaz
- Produced by: Raci Şaşmaz
- Starring: Necati Şaşmaz; Mustafa Yasar; Erdal Beşikçioğlu; Nur Aysan; Gürkan Uygun; Kenan Çoban
- Cinematography: Selahattin Sancaklı
- Edited by: Kemalettin Osmanlı
- Music by: Gökhan Kırdar
- Production company: Pana Film
- Distributed by: Özen Film
- Release date: 28 January 2011
- Running time: 105 minutes
- Country: Turkey
- Languages: Turkish; Hebrew; Arabic
- Budget: $10 million
- Box office: $12,732,423

Valley of the Wolves: Palestine (Turkish: Kurtlar Vadisi: Filistin) is a 2011 Turkish action film directed by Zübeyr Şaşmaz and starring Necati Şaşmaz, Nur Fettahoğlu and Erdal Beşikçioğlu. The story revolves around a Turkish commando team which goes to Israel on a rampage of revenge to track down the Israeli military commander responsible for the 2010 Gaza flotilla raid. It is part of the Valley of the Wolves media franchise, based on the Turkish television series of the same name, and a sequel to Valley of the Wolves: Iraq (2006) and Valley of the Wolves: Gladio (2008).

The film, which went on nationwide general release across Turkey on 28 January 2011, was at the time the most expensive Turkish films ever made.

Valley of the Wolves: Palestine was criticized for being anti-Israeli and inflammatory.

== Synopsis ==
After a civilian flotilla attempts to break the Israeli blockade of the Gaza Strip to bring humanitarian assistance and building materials, it is boarded by the Israeli military. Some activists violently resist and are killed by the Israeli soldiers. A Turkish commando team led by Polat Alemdar (Necati Şaşmaz) travels to the West Bank, where they launch a covert campaign against Israeli military personnel in an attempt to track down and eliminate an Israeli general, Moşe Ben Eliyezer (Erdal Beşikçioğlu), who was responsible for the flotilla raid. Polat manages to wound Moshe, who from that moment on goes with an eye patch. After he finds out that the Turkish commando receives support from Palestinian Abdullah, Moshe arrests Abdullah's family and bulldozers their house, with Abdullah's son Ahmet in it. After a fierce urban battle, Polat kills Moshe.

== Cast ==
- Necati Şaşmaz ... Polat Alemdar
- Nur Fettahoğlu ... Simone Levi (credited as Nur Aysan)
- Erdal Beşikçioğlu ... Moşe Ben Eliyezer
- Gürkan Uygun ... Memati Baş
- Kenan Çoban ... Abdülhey Çoban
- Erkan Sever
- Zafer Diper
- Umut Karadağ
- Mustafa Yaşar

== Production ==
Pana Film had already settled on the Palestinian territories as the setting of the film and was about to start shooting when the Gaza flotilla raid occurred on 31 May 2010. The existing script was subsequently rewritten to feature the raid as the centre piece of the plot. "This is not about taking revenge for Mavi Marmara", stated producer Zübeyr Şaşmaz. "The goal of the film is to show what the Palestinians are going through." Screenwriter Bahadır Özdener added: "We're calling out to people's conscience. All we want is freedom for innocent and tormented Palestinian people living in inhumane conditions in the world's biggest prison."

The film, which is projected to cost over $20 million, making it one of the most expensive Turkish films, was shot in 11 weeks on location in Adana and Tarsus (Turkey) with a team of 400 people during the summer of 2010. Officials from Pana Film said that these locations were chosen, after scouting several locations in Lebanon, Syria and Bulgaria as well as 20 provinces in Turkey, including Hatay, Elazığ, Şanlıurfa and Gaziantep, due to "the historical texture, the streets and local culture of these places". According to Bünyamın Köselı, writing in Today's Zaman, "approximately 3,000 fans were drawn to the Şehit Kerim neighborhood in Tarsus, where some of the scenes were shot", "which makes the salesmen in the city very happy". Extensive re-shoots were later required after some of the film's action sequences were burned during the lab process.

== Release ==
The announcement of the film's release came just days after Israel's attack on the Gaza flotilla and according to Emrah Güler, writing in Hürriyet Daily News, "the name of the movie was enough for millions to buy tickets". Technical problems however resulted in the release of the film being postponed until 28 January 2011.

The film was premiered at a special gala screening on 26 January 2011 and a press screening on 27 January 2011 at Nişantaşı City's Shopping Mall in Istanbul, where director Zübeyr Şaşmaz defended his film against criticism like that the film would earn money by exploiting Palestine and Islamic feelings.

The film finally received an 18 certificate from the FSK in Germany because of their initial concerns over the film's perceived anti-Israeli and anti-American overtones and its scheduled release on 27 January 2011 (International Holocaust Remembrance Day) which caused some controversy about it being antisemitic propaganda. Jewish organisations as well as politicians of Turkish descent opposed the film and some tried to ban it.

The film opened on nationwide general release in 364 screens across Turkey on 28 January 2011 at number 1 in the national box office with a first weekend gross of US$3,830,431.

== Controversy ==
The film has been called anti-Israeli and antisemitic. It was strongly criticized in Germany as anti-Israeli and inciting antisemitic sentiments, including the timing chosen for its premiere (Holocaust Remembrance Day).
