= Deli Yürek: Bumerang Cehennemi =

2001 film by Osman Sınav

- Theatrical film poster
- Directed by: Osman Sınav
- Written by: Osman Sınav; Raci Şaşmaz
- Produced by: Osman Sınav; Mustafa Şevki Doğan
- Starring: Kenan İmirzalıoğlu; Melda Bekcan; Oktay Kaynarca; Selçuk Yöntem; Zara
- Cinematography: Tevfik Şenol
- Music by: Aria
- Release date: 7 December 2001
- Running time: 120 mins
- Country: Turkey
- Language: Turkish

Deli Yürek: Bumerang Cehennemi ("Crazy Heart: Boomerang Hell") is a 2001 Turkish action film, written and directed by Osman Sınav. It is spun off from the TV series Deli Yürek.

== Plot ==
Yusuf Miroğlu goes with Zeynep to Diyarbakır in southeast Turkey to attend his best friend Cemal's wedding. While performing the traditional halay dance at the wedding, Cemal is killed by an assassin. Cemal's widowed wife Leyla pleads Yusuf to find the people behind the murder and bring them to justice. Yusuf finds himself caught in a struggle against the PKK and other terrorist groups in the area.

== Cast ==
- Kenan İmirzalıoğlu (Yusuf Miroğlu)
- Melda Bekcan (Zeynep)
- Oktay Kaynarca (Cemal)
- Selçuk Yöntem (Bozo)
- Zara (Leyla)
