= Şaşmaz =

Şaşmaz (literally "infallible" in Turkish) is a Turkish surname. Notable people with the surname include:

- Aytaç Şaşmaz (born 1998), Turkish actor and musician
- Necati Şaşmaz, (born 1971), Turkish actor
- Raci Şaşmaz, Turkish film producer, writer and actor
- Vatan Şaşmaz (1975–2017), Turkish actor, and author
- Zübeyr Şaşmaz (born 1982), Turkish film director
