= Erhan =

Erhan is a male Turkish given name of Turkic origin. With the combination of word “Er” and “Han”. It has the meaning of "Soldier King" or "Soldier Khan", with Er meaning "soldier" and Han meaning "Khan".

== Given name ==
- Erhan Albayrak (born 1977), Turkish football player
- Erhan Altın (born 1956), Turkish football player and manager
- Erhan Aydın (born 1981), Turkish football player
- Erhan Çınlar (born 1941), Turkish American probabilist and Professor Emeritus in Engineering at Princeton University
- Erhan Deniz (born 1985), Turkish kickboxer
- Erhan Dünge (born 1980), Turkish volleyball player
- Erhan Emre (born 1978), Turkish–German actor, director, film producer and writer
- Erhan Güven (born 1982), Turkish football player
- Erhan Kartal (born 1993), Turkish footballer
- Erhan Can Kartal (born 1998), Turkish actor
- Erhan Kavak (born 1987), Turkish-Swiss football player
- Erhan Kuşkapan (born 1988), Turkish football player
- Erhan Mašović (born 1998), Serbian football player
- Erhan Namlı (born 1974), Turkish football player
- Erhan Şentürk (born 1989), Turkish football player

== Middle name ==
- Mehmet Erhan Tanman (born 1989), Turkish composer

== Surname ==
- Iulian Erhan (born 1986), Moldovan football player
- Pantelimon Erhan (1884–1971), Moldovan politician and prime minister of the Moldavian Democratic Republic (1917–1918)
