= Valley of the Wolves =

Turkish media franchise

- Created by: Osman Sınav
- Original work: Valley of the Wolves (2003–2005)

Films and television
- Film(s): Valley of the Wolves: Iraq (2006); Muro: Damn the Humanist Inside (2008); Valley of the Wolves: Gladio (2009); Valley of the Wolves: Palestine (2011); Valley of the Wolves: Homeland (2017)
- Television series: Valley of the Wolves (2003–2005); Valley of the Wolves: Terror (2007); Valley of the Wolves: Ambush (2007–2016)

Valley of the Wolves (Turkish: Kurtlar Vadisi) is a Turkish media franchise created by Osman Sınav. The franchise includes television series, films, and books. It became popular in Turkey, with high ratings for the television series and box-office success for the first film.

== Production history ==
Valley of the Wolves (Turkish: Kurtlar Vadisi) is the original television series, created by Osman Sınav, which followed a Turkish intelligence agent working under the assumed identity of Polat Alemdar (played by Necati Şaşmaz) who attempts to infiltrate the Turkish mafia. The 97-episode series aired from 2003 to 2005.

=== Valley of the Wolves: Iraq ===
Valley of the Wolves: Iraq (Turkish: Kurtlar Vadisi: Irak) is a controversial 2006 spin-off film, directed by Serdar Akar, which follows Polat Alemdar (Necati Şaşmaz) and his team as they go to northern Iraq during its occupation to avenge the death of Turkish soldiers. Its reported anti-Americanism and antisemitism attracted interest from American and European media and other organizations, such as the Anti-Defamation League. Released in Turkey on February 3, 2006, it was one of the year's highest-grossing Turkish films.

=== Valley of the Wolves: Terror ===
Valley of the Wolves: Terror (Turkish: Kurtlar Vadisi: Terör) is a short-lived spin-off television series which follows Polat Alemdar in his attempts to infiltrate Kurdish-separatist militant networks in Turkey. The first episode (which aired on February 8, 2007) had good ratings, but its political content and violence triggered a harsh response from the Radio and Television Supreme Council (RTÜK). The series was then cancelled, sparking controversy about censorship in Turkey.

=== Valley of the Wolves: Ambush ===
Valley of the Wolves: Ambush (Turkish: Kurtlar Vadisi: Pusu) is a television series produced after the cancellation of the previous series. Airing on Show TV, Star TV, ATV Kanal D and Mesaj TV Meltem TV from April 20, 2007 to June 16, 2016, the series had good ratings.

Polat Alemdar wages a vigilante struggle against four Turkish families who control the country's economy and helps Ahu Toros, a young businesswoman who lost her father. Polat has a rival, İskender Büyük, and marries Ebru Duru. Two other protagonists are Memati and Abdülhey; Memati is a former criminal associate of Süleyman Çakır, and Abdülhey is a Turkish intelligence agent.

Aron Feller is an ex-CIA agent attempting to exert influence in Turkey. Polat kills İskender Büyük, and loses Ebru; their young daughter is taken by Aron Feller to be raised as a Christian in the US.

After İskender's death, Polat and his team fight Kurdish terrorists associated with the Kurdistan Workers' Party. Ersoy Ulubey wants to seize Turkey with terrorism and his relationships with family leaders such as Haşim Ağa, İzzet Ağa, and Yaşar Ağa, creating the Templars (a secret society). Polat maintains his relationship with the İhtiyarlar (the Elders), who see him as Turkey's protector.

Polat kills Ersoy and Aron Feller, and Süleyman Çakır's family returns from a six-year absence. A new character, Kara, had also worked for the Elders. Other new characters include Beyefendi, Mete Ağır, Memduh Baba, Şeref Zazaoğlu, and Mete Aymar. Memati and the "White Hair" of the Elders are killed by the Templars.

Polat and his friends, in shock after Memati's death, are unable to take revenge. The Elders choose Adil Eşrefoğlu as their new White Hair. Adil is the brother of Doğu Eşrefoğlu, and the brothers and Aslan Akbey created the Valley of the Wolves mission. A new youth team, the Regional KGT, comes to Turkey to help Polat complete his mission. Polat is forced to kidnap Adil, who tells him that he used to be like Polat in his youth. Adil says that he formed the KGT with Doğu, and trained Aslan Akbey. Sencer, an Elder, is revealed as the mastermind behind the murders of Memati and the former White Hair. Sencer and Adil are executed by the Elders, who are executed in turn.

Akif and foreign minister Hoca conspire to make Polat appear dead to everyone but the Elders, and Polat is chosen as the White Hair. Cahit joins the Templars, meets Safiye Karahanlı, and tries to win her confidence. Abdülhey is found by Hoca mourning Polat's death. Cahit meets Margaret Theodora, and is introduced to Maestro Ronald and Inspector Kane. Two Elders are murdered by the Templars, and Cahit learns that someone other than Maestro Ronald is their leader. Kara's grandchild has been murdered by Poyraz, and Kara seeks revenge; Polat and Kara kill Poyraz. Cahit (Polat's bodyguard when he was the White Hair) is summoned by Timur to a meeting; Polat wants to surprise Cahit, but accidentally shoots him. The Templars learn that Abdülhey was vice-president of the Elders, but are still in the dark about Polat.

After Inspector Kane's death, UN member Mr. Key takes revenge by murdering Margaret and many others. Polat forms Black Flag (a military team) to help other sympathetic countries, with Kara its commander. A meeting is planned in Cyprus, where the Templar leader will be present. Cahit demolishes the place and leaves with Kara. Abdülhey is killed by a bomb planted in the KGT office, and Kara is injected with Ebola.

Mr. Key is murdered by Akif. Turkish baron Fehmi Kuzuzade tries to form a council to rule Turkey, but is assassinated by Polat. New antagonists include John Smith, Tilki Andrei, Sagir, and Sadık Britani. Professor Martin (a friend of Safiye) was a Templar leader, and plans to destroy Polat's family and kidnap Elif. Ömer dies of a heart attack during daily prayers, and Nazife is poisoned by Professor Martin. Polat is kidnapped by the Templars, whose leader offers him the Turkish leadership. He escapes; he and Cahit kill the Templar leader and arrest his staff. Polat marries Leyla, who is killed in an explosion on their honeymoon.

=== Muro: Damn the Humanist Inside ===
Muro: Damn the Humanist Inside (Turkish: Muro: Lanet Olsun İçimdeki İnsan Sevgisine) is a 2008 spin-off film directed by Zübeyr Şaşmaz and starring Mustafa Üstündağ and Şefik Onatoğlu as two revolutionaries recently released from prison who stumble across an illegal organization run by a former friend. Released in Turkey on December 5, 2008, it was the year's third-highest-grossing Turkish film.

=== Valley of the Wolves: Gladio ===
Valley of the Wolves: Gladio (Turkish: Kurtlar Vadisi: Gladio) is a 2009 spin-off film directed by Sadullah Şentürk which follows retired security intelligence agent Iskender Buyuk (Musa Uzunlar) as he strikes back against his former employers by revealing all he knows about Operation Gladio. "It addresses Turkey’s years-long adventure with the deep state and illegal formations nested within the state" and "aims to provide an opportunity for movie fans to closely look at the 'deep gangs' that attempted to stir and divide Turkey with subversive plots," according to Betül Akkaya Demirbaş in Today's Zaman. Released in Turkey on November 20, 2009, it was the year's fifth-highest-grossing Turkish film.

=== Valley of the Wolves: Palestine ===
Valley of the Wolves: Palestine (Turkish: Kurtlar Vadisi: Filistin) is a 2011 spin-off film directed by Zübeyr Şaşmaz which follows Polat Alemdar (Necati Şaşmaz) and his team as they go to Israel to bring down an Israeli military commander who planned and conducted an attack on a Gaza aid flotilla.

=== Valley of the Wolves: Homeland ===
Valley of the Wolves: Homeland (Turkish: Kurtlar Vadisi: Vatan) is a 2017 spin-off film directed by Serdar Akar which is set during the 2016 Turkish coup attempt. During an operation in Iraq, Polat Alemdar and his team obtain a map of Turkey showing several strategic locations, including military bases, special operations centers, and a border town near Syria. They discover that a coup attempt is being planned inside the country, while a large military force is simultaneously positioned near the border, waiting to launch an attack. Polat Alemdar and his team, working with loyal state institutions, attempt to uncover and prevent both the internal coup and the external military operation.

== Cultural influence ==
"Kurtlar Vadisi became an instant hit with its references to Turkish politics, its unabashed abuse of social sensitivities on patriotism, and with unprecedented scenes of violence that included assassination and torture on television", Hürriyet Daily News reviewer Emrah Güler wrote. "Not unlike John Woo’s Face/Off, an undercover Turkish agent goes through a set of plastic surgeries to infiltrate the mafia, along with a gunman who walks surefooted in this muddy underworld", Güler continued; "the two go through ordeals of every kind for Polat to become the next baron so that he can break them apart." "The hype eventually got so big that the final episodes featured Andy Garcia as the big American mafia boss and Sharon Stone as his wife, eventually lending a kiss to our hero."

Lead character Polat Alemdar (Necati Şaşmaz) was "established in the image of a mafia-macho Turkish guy", Güler wrote, and was "admired by unemployed and frustrated young men all over Turkey". Güler describes him as "the Turkish equivalent of 24's Jack Bauer, entangled in the deep state, disguised as a mafia boss". "Short and ordinary looking," according to Güler, "Polat has a self-defined sense of justice that includes hanging traitors in the city center of Istanbul." Güler concluded, "The series reached such a cult status that many young men officially changed their names to Polat Alemdar". The series has been dubbed into the Syrian Arabic dialect.

== Controversy with Israel ==
An episode of Valley of the Wolves: Ambush that depicted Israeli Mossad agents spying in Turkey and kidnapping Turkish babies was criticized by the Israeli government and media. The Turkish government's refusal to act on Israeli requests to better censor the series contributed to the deepening of a dispute between the countries which culminated in Turkey's threat to recall ambassador to Israel Ahmet Oguz Celikkol after a controversial diplomatic meeting with Israeli Deputy Foreign Minister Danny Ayalon in January 2010.

== See also ==
- Ayrılık
- Zahra's Blue Eyes
