= Tuğçe Kazaz =

Turkish actress, model and beauty pageant titleholder

- Born: 26 August 1982 (age 44); Edremit, Balıkesir Province, Turkey
- Other name: Maria Seitaridis
- Spouse: George Seitaridis (m. 2005; div. 2008)
- Modeling information
- Height: 1.83 m (6 ft 0 in)
- Hair color: Light brown/Blonde
- Eye color: Blue

Tuğçe Kazaz (born 26 August 1982) is a Turkish actress, model and beauty pageant titleholder who was crowned Miss Turkey 2001.

== Biography ==
Kazaz was born in Edremit, Balıkesir Province. She was educated in international relations at the Yeditepe University in Istanbul.

She acted as Arzu in the youth series Kampüsistan and period series "Son Yaz Balkanlar 1912" alongside Hazal Kaya, Furkan Palalı. She had leading role in period film Uzun Hikaye alongside Kenan İmirzalıoğlu. She played in the Greek movie Loafing and Camouflage: Sirens in the Aegean where she met her ex-husband, George Seitaridis. Before her marriage in September 2005, she converted to Orthodox Christianity to be of the same religion as her husband, an act that caused some negative reaction in her country. She also said about her change of religion "only God can judge me". After 3 years of marriage she ended up divorcing and came back to her homeland. Kazaz became a Muslim again. Kazaz stated that she quit smoking, drinking and night life, and claimed that she rejected an offer to be one of Victoria's Secret's angels, according to a Turkish media. She was a keynote speaker in the anti-LGBT protest in Istanbul, where she declared war on LGBT rights.

== Filmography ==
- Kampüsistan (2003), TV series
- Loafing and Camouflage: Sirens in the Aegean (2005)
- Uzun Hikâye (2012), Film
- Son Yaz (2012), Film
- Kafkas (2014), Film

Awards
Preceded by Yüksel Ak (Izmir)	Miss Turkey; 2001	Succeeded by Azra Akın (Istanbul)
