= Kim 1 Milyon İster? =

- Presented by: Kenan Işık
- Country of origin: Turkey
- Original language: Turkish
- No. of seasons: 1

Original release
- Network: Star TV
- Release: 1 February 2008 – 2008

Related
- Kim 500 Milyar İster? Kim 500 Bin İster? Kim Milyoner Olmak İster?

Kim 1 Milyon İster? (English: Who Wants One Million?) is a Turkish game show based on the original British format of Who Wants to Be a Millionaire?. The programme aired for the first time on Star TV on February 1, 2008, and only aired for one season.

The main goal of the game was to win 1,000,000 YTL by answering 16 multiple‑choice questions correctly. Participants had access to four lifelines: 50:50, Phone‑a‑Friend, Ask the Audience, and Switch the Question (the latter granted after the 10th question). This Turkish version did not use the Fastest Finger First round, like previous versions.

== Money tree ==
Payout structure
Question number	Question value
16	1,000,000 YTL
15	500,000 YTL
14	250,000 YTL
13	125,000 YTL
12	64,000 YTL
11	32,000 YTL
10	16,000 YTL
9	8,000 YTL
8	4,000 YTL
7	2,000 YTL
6	1,200 YTL
5	750 YTL
4	400 YTL
3	300 YTL
2	200 YTL
1	100 YTL
Milestone Top prize

== Lifelines ==
- 50:50 (Yarı Yarıya) – eliminates two wrong answers.
- Phone‑a‑Friend (Telefon) – contestant calls a friend for help.
- Ask the Audience (Seyirciye Sorma) – studio audience votes.
- Switch the Question (Soru Değiştirme) – available after the 10th question.
