= Musa Uzunlar =

Turkish actor

- Born: 21 April 1959 (age 67); Antalya, Turkey
- Occupation: Actor
- Years active: 1981–present

Musa Uzunlar (born 21 April 1959) is a Turkish actor. Uzunlar acted as Reşat in the Turkish TV series Fatmagül'ün Suçu Ne?. He played in Onur Ünlü's surreal drama "Şubat". He played a lot of different roles in Turkish TV series and plays. He then portrayed the role of Bahri Umman in the TV series and spin off film of Poyraz Karayel. He played in hit series and spin off film of "Kurtlar Vadisi Pusu".

== Theatre ==
- Yüzleşme
- Ful Yaprakaları
- Yaban
- Haydutlar
- Efrasyabın Hikayeleri
- Şerefe 20. Yüzyıl
- Urfaust

== Filmography ==
=== TV series ===
- Aile - 2023-2024 - İlyas Koruzade
- Biz Kimden Kaçıyorduk Anne? - 2023 - Grandfather
- Hayatımın Şansı - 2022–2023 - Turgay Moral
- Bir Annenin Günahı - 2020 - Sadri Güngör
- 8. Gün - 2018 - Hayati Şahin
- Poyraz Karayel - 2015–2017 - Bahri Umman
- Karanlıklar Çiçeği - 2012 - Tariyel Bey
- Şubat - 2012–2013 - Aziz Bey / Isaac Christian Novak
- Fatmagül'ün Suçu Ne? - 2010–2012 - Reşat Yaşaran
- Kurtlar Vadisi Pusu - 2007–2010 - İskender Büyük
- Yağmur Zamanı - 2004–2006 - Levent
- Karanlıkta Koşanlar - 2001 - Priest
- Merdoğlu - 2000
- Nilgün - 1999 - Sinan
- Ateş Dansı - 1998 - Sinan
- Süper Baba - 1993 - Sinan
- Geçmiş Bahar Mimozaları - 1989

=== Film ===
- Dehşet Bey - 2025 - Harun Hürriyet
- Uykucu - 2025 - Asim
- Aşkın Kıyameti - 2022 - Behçet
- Poyraz Karayel: Küresel Sermaye - 2016 - Bahri Umman
- Açlığa Doymak - Serdar
- Cingöz Recai: Bir Efsanenin Dönüşü - Ghost
- Kurtlar Vadisi Gladio - 2009 - İskender Büyük
- Hayal Kurma Oyunları - 2004 - Mother's boyfriend
- Bütün Kapılar Kapalıydı - 1990 - Suat

== Sources ==
- Musa Uzunlar - İskender Büyük
