= Kenan Çoban =

Turkish actor

- Born: 22 January 1975 (age 51); Elazığ, Turkey
- Occupation: Actor
- Years active: 2003–present
- Known for: Role of Abdülhey in the Valley of the Wolves, And Fahri in Eşkıya Dünyaya Hükümdar Olmaz
- Spouse(s): Dilek Özkan (2011); Helin Nazlı Çoban (2017- )

Kenan Çoban (born 22 January 1975, Elazığ) is a Turkish actor who is known for playing the role of Abdülhey Çoban in the Valley of the Wolves.

== Filmography ==
Film
Year	Title	Role	Notes
2003-2005	Kurtlar Vadisi	Abdülhey	Supporting Leading actor
2006	Kurtlar Vadisi Irak	Abdülhey	Supporting Leading actor
2007	Halil İbrahim Sofrası	Himself	Guest Star
2007	Ayrılık	Kerem	Leading actor
2007	Kurtlar Vadisi Terör	Abdülhey	Supporting Leading actor
2011	Kurtlar Vadisi Filistin	Abdülhey	Supporting Leading actor
2007-2014	Kurtlar Vadisi Pusu	Abdülhey	Supporting Leading actor
2014	Beyaz Karanfil	Zülfü Korkmaz	Supporting Leading actor
2015–2020	Eşkıya Dünyaya Hükümdar Olmaz	Fahri	Supporting Leading actor
2022	El Haybe		Supporting Leading actor
2024-	Mehmed: Fetihler Sultani	Malkoçoğlu Bali Bey	Supporting Leading actor
