= Valley of the Wolves: Iraq =

Valley Of The Wolves: Iraq
- Theatrical release poster
- Directed by: Serdar Akar; Sadullah Şentürk
- Written by: Raci Şaşmaz; Bahadır Özdener; Soner Yalçın (concept creator)
- Produced by: Raci Şaşmaz
- Starring: Necati Şaşmaz; Billy Zane; Ghassan Massoud; Gary Busey; Diego Serrano; Gürkan Uygun; Bergüzar Korel
- Cinematography: Selahattin Sancaklı
- Edited by: Kemalettin Osmanlı
- Music by: Gökhan Kırdar
- Release date: February 3, 2006
- Running time: 122 min.
- Country: Turkey
- Languages: Turkish; English; Arabic; German; Kurdish
- Budget: $14,000,000
- Box office: $27,900,000

Valley of the Wolves: Iraq (Turkish: Kurtlar Vadisi: Irak) is a 2006 Turkish action film directed by Serdar Akar and starring Necati Şaşmaz, Billy Zane and Ghassan Massoud. The story concerns a Turkish commando team which goes to Iraq to track down the US military commander responsible for the Hood event.

The film is set during the occupation of Iraq and includes references to other real events such as the Abu Ghraib prison scandal. The film, which went on nationwide general release across Turkey on February 3, 2006, was the highest-grossing Turkish films of 2006 and is one of the most expensive Turkish films ever made.

It is part of the Valley of the Wolves media franchise, based on the Turkish television series of the same name, and was followed by Valley of the Wolves: Gladio (2008) and Valley of the Wolves: Palestine (2010).

Filmed with a budget of $14 million, this was the most expensive Turkish film ever made at the time of its release before being surpassed by A.R.O.G. The film grossed $27.9 million at the box office — $25.1 million in Turkey and $2.8 million in Europe.

Opinions of the film greatly varied. While the Wall Street Journal characterized it as "a cross between American Psycho in uniform and the Protocols of the Elders of Zion", Turkey's parliamentary speaker Bülent Arınç described it as "absolutely magnificent".

== Background ==
The film covers through fiction real-life events like the occupation of Iraq, the execution of Daniel Pearl and the Abu Ghraib torture scandal. Nevertheless, the film's primary focus is the Hood event (Turkish: Çuval Olayı), an incident on July 4, 2003 following the 2003 invasion of Iraq where a group of Turkish military personnel operating in northern Iraq were captured, led away with hoods over their heads, and interrogated by the United States military.

The arrest is infamous in Turkey as the so-called "Hood event". The soldiers were led out of their headquarters at gunpoint, with hoods over their heads and subsequently detained for sixty hours before being released, after Turkey protested to the United States. A US-Turkish commission set up to investigate the incident later issued a joint statement of regret and US Defense Secretary Donald Rumsfeld wrote a letter to the Turkish Prime Minister Recep Tayyip Erdoğan, expressing sorrow over the event.

== Plot ==
The film opens with a fictional depiction of a real-life incident, the "Hood event". On July 4, 2003, the Turkish soldiers believe they are receiving an ordinary visit from their NATO allies, but a sudden change occurs, and 11 allied Turkish special forces soldiers and 13 civilians are arrested by Colonel Sam William Marshall (Billy Zane), in the northern Iraqi town of Sulaymaniyah. They are forced to wear hoods while in detention, and are released some time later.

A Turkish officer named Suleyman Aslan, who was a member of the special forces troops involved in the Hood event, is unable to bear the shame of what happened, and commits suicide. Before doing so, he writes a letter saying goodbye to his friend, Polat Alemdar (Necati Şaşmaz). Alemdar is a former Turkish intelligence agent who has recently severed links to the government agency for which he worked. Determined to avenge his friend's humiliation, Alemdar travels to Iraq along with several of his colleagues, seeking vengeance on the American commander whose actions led to Aslan's suicide.

At a checkpoint, Alemdar and his team kill three Iraqi Kurdish paramilitary Peshmerga soldiers. They attach explosives to the foundation of a hotel, to which they demand Colonel Sam William Marshall, who was responsible for the hooding incident, come. When Marshall arrives, Polat wants him to put a sack over his head and to publicly leave the hotel with him, allowing journalists to take photos, taking the same insult he committed to Polat's dead friend. The group threatens to blow up the hotel unless Marshall and some of his men let themselves be led out of the hotel while hooded. Marshall refuses and brings in a group of Iraqi children as human shields. Alemdar gives in and leaves.

Marshall raids an Arab wedding on the pretext of hunting "terrorists". When the usual celebratory gunfire starts, one soldier states: "Now they are shooting, now they are terrorists"; they attack a wedding party, where a small child named Ali sticks a branch up the barrel of one of the soldiers' guns. At first, the soldier just hushes the boy away; the second time, he opens fire and afterwards looks astonished as he sees the little child dead. The rest of the soldiers panic and open fire on the wedding guests, beat up the bride, shoot the groom, the guests and children. The survivors are captured and forced into an airtight container truck and sent to Abu Ghraib prison.

En route to Abu Ghraib, an American soldier complains that the prisoners might be suffocating in the truck. One of Marshall's men then fires on the truck, spraying the detainees with bullets. "See, now they won't suffocate to death", he says. When the soldier threatens to report the incident, he is promptly shot. In Abu Ghraib, a group of American soldiers is making naked human pyramids from those arrested in the wedding, aided by an Arab interpreter. The prisoners are washed with high pressure nozzles in what appears to be cattle stalls.

In a later scene, the execution of a Western journalist by Iraqi rebels is about to take place, but the sheikh Abdurrahman Halis Karkuki, who is esteemed by the rebels, prevents it, and offers the journalist the opportunity to kill the rebel who was about to kill him. The rebel does not resist, but the journalist declines the offer. Thereafter, the bride who survived the earlier massacre, Leyla, wants revenge by becoming a suicide bomber, but is talked out of it by the Sheikh. Leyla hurries to a market to stop her brother-in-law Abu Ali, the father of the child killed at the wedding, from blowing himself up in the place where Col. Marshall is having a meeting, but she arrives too late. Alemdar and his men, who are there to assassinate Marshall, are led to safety by Leyla.

Alemdar and his team then attempt to kill Marshall again by rigging a bomb in a piano which once belonged to Saddam Hussein and is delivered to Marshall as a gift. The bomb explodes prematurely, and Marshall survives. Alemdar and Leyla then go to a mosque, to meet the sheikh. Marshall tracks them down, however, and a big firefight ensues. The entire village and mosque are destroyed by heavy gunfire. Together they manage to kill Marshall, but Leyla is also killed by Marshall.

== Cast ==
- Necati Şaşmaz - Polat Alemdar
- Billy Zane - Sam William Marshall
- Ghassan Massoud - Sheikh Abdurrahman Halis Karkuki
- Bergüzar Korel - Leyla
- Gürkan Uygun - Memati
- Abdikariim Tahliil - Ahmed Taajir
- Diego Serrano - Dante
- Kenan Çoban - Abdülhey
- Erhan Ufak - Erhan
- Spencer Garrett - George Baltimore
- Gary Busey - Doctor
- Nusret Şenay - Turkish commander
- Tayfun Eraslan - Lieutenant Süleyman Aslan (a suicide at the start of the film)
- Tito Ortiz - Major U.S. Official
- İsmet Hürmüzlü - Arab leader
- Jihad Abdou - Kurdish leader
- Yavuz İmsel - Turkmen leader
- Mauro Martino - Mr. Fender, hotel manager

== Reception ==
The film upset some viewers for its heavy and incriminating subject matter. Some have criticized it for alleged stereotyping and "black and white" portrayal of the opposing forces. The controversy arises mainly from the following scenes:

- In one sequence, American soldiers raid an Iraqi wedding and massacre a number of civilians, which might be an allusion to a wedding party massacre perpetrated by US forces caught on tape in Mukaradeeb on May 19, 2004.
- U.S. soldiers torture detainees in Abu Ghraib prison, which includes a female soldier making a human pyramid, referring to the Abu Ghraib torture and prisoner abuse by US soldiers. It is the first depiction of actions by American soldiers at the Abu Ghraib prison ever to appear on film.
- While captives are transported on a long journey in a container on a truck, one guard says to the other: "They might suffocate in the container because there is no fresh air supply". The truck stops, the American guard gets off the truck and fires hundreds of bullet-holes into the container with an automatic weapon "in order to make holes for the air to get in", and as a result many detainees are injured or get killed. A similar event is reported to have occurred in Afghanistan after the battle for Mazar-i-Sharif on November 9, 2001, with Taliban soldiers in the container and soldiers of the Afghan Northern Alliance as their guardians, as described in the documentary film Afghan Massacre: The Convoy of Death by Irish filmmaker Jamie Doran. This event is also reenacted in the film The Road to Guantanamo.
- The film features a Jewish American U.S. Army doctor (Gary Busey) who, as an inhuman figure common in urban legends, removes organs from injured civilian prisoners to sell to rich people in New York, London and Tel-Aviv for transplantation.

=== Scriptwriter and director point of view ===
The film's scriptwriter Bahadir Ozdener has defined the film by saying:

Our film is a sort of political action. Maybe 60 or 70 percent of what happens on screen is factually true. Turkey and America are allies, but Turkey wants to say something to its friend. We want to say the bitter truth. We want to say that this is wrong.

The movie's director, Serdar Akar, went further and said the film was supposed to promote a dialogue between religions.

=== International reception ===
==== Turkey ====
- The film has pulled in record audiences on its release in Turkey, capitalizing on widespread opposition to the Iraq War.
- When asked about the factual nature of the scenario, Bülent Arınç, the chairman of the Turkish Parliament, replied "yes, this was exactly as it happened". He called the movie "an extraordinary film that will go into history".
- Foreign minister Abdullah Gul states that "the film is no worse than some of the productions of Hollywood studios".
- Istanbul mayor Kadir Topbaş told the Associated Press that the movie "was very successful — a soldier's honor must never be damaged".
- The reception in the Turkish media was split. Some called it a milestone for the Turkish film industry — others warned the movie might lead to a strengthening of religious extremism.
- Mehmet Ali Birand, a prominent Turkish columnist and anchorman, said he admired the filmmakers. "They have played with the inner feelings, unsatisfied feelings of Turkish public opinion, and they are making money."

==== Germany ====
- In Germany, the home of the European Union's largest Turkish community, the film was heavily criticized for its alleged racism and antisemitism by several politicians from both the right and left ends of the spectrum of mainstream German politics and in several leading newspapers. As a reviewer in the mainstream magazine Der Spiegel put it, referring to the film's reliance on a revenge motif, "This wouldn't be so bad if the film didn't portray the opponents of Turks and Muslims so brutally — the bad guys in this black and white world are the Americans, the Kurds, the Christians and the Jews.
- In an interview with Bild am Sonntag on February 19, 2006, Bavarian premier Edmund Stoiber called upon German theatre owners to stop showing Valley of the Wolves. Shortly afterward, Germany's largest cinema chain, CinemaxX, pulled the film, which had been popular among Germany's large Turkish community, from its theatres in response to the criticism from politicians.
- The film won a Bogey Award in Germany.
- "The Central Council of Jews", a Jewish-German organization, have expressed its opinion that Valley of the Wolves – Iraq (Kurtlar Vadisi – Irak) holds antisemitic views, and is racist. It requested German cinemas stop showing the film.

==== United States ====
- The film has received only minor exposure in the United States and is not widely known.
- On Comedy Central's The Daily Show, Jon Stewart lampooned actors Billy Zane and Gary Busey, in an attempt to satirize the mainstream media's reaction to the film. During the same segment, several clips were played from American films portraying unidentified terrorists of Muslim, Arab or Middle Eastern extraction. The segment juxtaposes the stereotypes of Arabs and Muslims in Hollywood films from the 1980s and 1990s to the reactions of mainstream American media pundits regarding the film.
- The U.S. Army recommended that Army personnel overseas not approach cinemas in which the movie is played.
- Busey's attorney Vicki Roberts, released a statement: "If Gary played a rapist in a movie, would anyone believe him to be an actual rapist? He is an actor, not a politician." When asked about the moral and ethical implications of portraying what could be construed as an antisemitic stereotype in a foreign movie, Roberts declined to comment any further.

== See also ==
- Kurtlar Vadisi, the TV series version of the film
