= Valley of the Wolves: Gladio =

- Theatrical poster
- Directed by: Sadullah Şentürk
- Written by: Cüneyt Aysan; Bahadır Özdener; Raci Şaşmaz
- Produced by: Raci Şaşmaz
- Starring: Musa Uzunlar; Ayfer Dönmez; Tuğrul Çetiner
- Cinematography: Selahattin Sancaklı
- Edited by: Kemalettin Osmanlı
- Music by: Gökhan Kırdar
- Production company: Pana Film
- Distributed by: Özen Film; Maxximum Film und Kunst
- Release date: November 20, 2009
- Running time: 122 minutes
- Country: Turkey
- Language: Turkish
- Box office: $4,703,086

Valley of the Wolves: Gladio (Turkish: Kurtlar Vadisi: Gladio) is a 2009 Turkish action film directed by Sadullah Şentürk. It follows the retired security intelligence agent İskender Büyük, as he strikes back against his one-time employers by revealing all he knows about Gladio. The film, which went on nationwide general release across Turkey on November 20, 2009, was the fifth highest grossing Turkish film of 2009. It is part of the Valley of the Wolves media franchise, based on the Turkish television series of the same name, along with Valley of the Wolves: Iraq (2006) and Valley of the Wolves: Palestine (2010).

== Synopsis ==
Retired security intelligence agent Iskender Buyuk (Alexander the Great) has kept his government's secrets for years, but when the men he has sworn to protect suddenly deserts him, he finds himself in the defendant's chair, with only young and inexperienced lawyer Ayse to represent his interests. Angered by this turn of events, he strikes back against his one-time employers by revealing all he knows about covert missions.

== Cast ==
- Musa Uzunlar – İskender Büyük
- Tuğrul Çetiner – Bülent Fuat Aras
- Ayfer Dönmez – Ayse
- Ali Başar – Shahid Major Ahmet Cem Ersever
- Sezai Aydın – Turgut Özal
- Işıl Ertuna – Semra Özal
- Hakan İlçin – Gendarmerie Commander
- Köksal Engür – Process notes General
- Ali Rıza Soydan – Şener Pasha
- Sinan Pekinton – Judge
- Uğur Taşdemir – Announcer
- Hakan Vanlı – Journalist Ali
- Celalettin Demirel – Head guards
- Yurdaer Tosun – Ercüment
- Buket Aslan – İskender's Girlfriend
- Hüseyin Yirik – İskender's lawyer
- Erol Alpsoykan – Av. Haşim İçtürk
- Sinan Altuntaş – Security
- Mustafa Develi – Abdullah Öcalan
- Serap Ergen – Kurdish Women
- Rafet Özdemir – Prime Minister
- Cengiz Gürkısmet – Maestro
- Sinem Öçalır – Clerk
- Yıldıray Yıldızoğlu – Usher
- Ülkü Şahiner – Pasha's wife notes client

== Release ==
The film opened on 311 screens across Turkey on November 20, 2009, at number 2 in the box office chart with an opening weekend gross of $1,510,896.

== Reception ==
=== Commercial ===
The film was the fifth highest grossing Turkish film of 2009, making $4,703,086 worldwide.

=== Critical ===
Turkish Daily News reviewer Emrah Güler, states that the film "comes to theaters in the heat of the Ergenekon investigation, an alleged ultra-nationalistic organization with ties in the military, media and justice, and accused of terrorism, a media-favorite for the last six months", with "real questions on the terrorist organization PKK, coups in the last half-a-century, and alleged assassinations against previous presidents are answered through a fictitious deep throat". He recommends the film to "those who couldn’t get more of the original series, and those who feed on state conspiracies", but warns "the movie features a plethora of plot holes, inconsistencies within the script, with real time events, and with its predecessors. Those who are hoping for impressive action scenes like in Kurtlar Vadisi – Irak go home empty-handed as well." He finishes by saying "those who refrain from subjective political dramas, and those who’re tired of hearing and reading about the never ending Ergenekon stories" should avoid it.

According to Betül Akkaya Demirbaş in Today's Zaman, "it addresses Turkey’s years-long adventure with the deep state and illegal formations nested within the state" and "aims to provide an opportunity for movie fans to closely look at the 'deep gangs' that attempted to stir and divide Turkey with subversive plots".
