= Nihat Nikerel =

Turkish actor

Nihat Nikerel (05 February 1950 – 26 September 2009) was a Turkish actor, best known for his role in the crime drama series Kurtlar Vadisi.

== Selected filmography ==
- Tarzan of Manisa (1994)
