= Nur Fettahoğlu =

Turkish actress (born 1980)

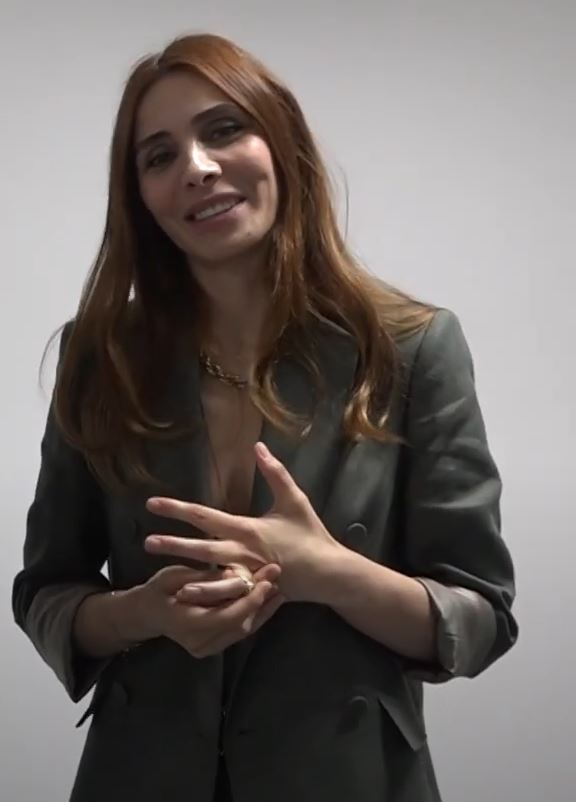
- Fettahoğlu in 2017
- Born: Asiye Nur Fettahoğlu; 12 November 1980 (age 45); Duisburg, West Germany
- Citizenship: Turkey; Germany
- Education: Haliç University
- Occupations: Actress; television presenter; fashion designer; model
- Years active: 2007–present
- Notable work: Muhteşem Yüzyıl as Mahidevran Sultan
- Spouses: Murat Aysan (m. 2008; div. 2011) Levent Veziroğlu (m. 2013; div. 2021)
- Children: 1
- Awards: BIAF Award for Best International Actress in Payitaht: Abdülhamid

Asiye Nur Fettahoğlu (Turkish pronunciation: [nuɾ ˈfettahoːɫu]) (born 12 November 1980) is a Turkish-German actress, model, television presenter and fashion designer known for playing numerous characters in several films and television series, including her role as Mahidevran Sultan in Muhteşem Yüzyıl.

== Early life ==
Fettahoğlu was born to Fatma and Sinan Fettahoğlu as one of their five children in Duisburg, West Germany. Her family is from Rize, Turkey. After the Ottoman Empire collapsed, her paternal family, who were Cretan Muslims, immigrated to Turkey from Crete, Greece. Her maternal family who were originally Kosovo Albanians, immigrated from Yugoslavia to Rize. She was educated at Beşiktaş High School before enrolling in Haliç University, where she graduated with a degree in fashion design. She worked for a while as a television anchor for financial news on the Sky Türk channel.

== Personal life ==
Between 2008 and 2011, Fettahoğlu was married to Murat Aysan. After they divorced, she married businessman Levent Veziroğlu in 2013. The couple separated in 2015 but reconciled before the divorce proceedings were finalized. On 11 February 2016, Fettahoğlu gave birth to their first child, a daughter named Elisa. The couple formally divorced in March 2021.

== Filmography ==
Streaming series
Year	Title	Role	Network
2017–2018	Fi	Billur	puhutv
2018–2019	Bozkır	Dilara Eroğlu	BluTV
2021	Hükümsüz	Melek Ender	Exxen
2022	Ayak İşleri	Bengi	GAİN
TV Series
Year	Title	Role	Notes
2007	Benden Baba Olmaz	Tülay Cenk	Supporting role
2007	Gönül Salıncağı	Aylin Arısoy	Supporting role
2008–2010	Aşk-ı Memnu	Peyker Yöreoğlu	Leading role
2011–2014	Muhteşem Yüzyıl	Mahidevran Sultan	Leading role
2014–2015	Hayat Yolunda	Dr. Şafak Günay	Leading role
2015–2016	Filinta	Süreyya	Leading role
2017–2018	Payitaht: Abdülhamid	Efsun	Supporting role
2019	Kardeş Çocukları	Umay Karay	Leading role
2020	Babil	Eda Saygun	Leading role
2021	Kağıt Ev	Aylin Fırtına	Leading role
2022	Darmaduman	Beliz Servet	Leading role
2024	Yabani	Özge Aydin	Leading role
Film
Year	Title	Role	Notes
2010	Gişe Memuru	Kadın	Leading role
2010	Kurtlar Vadisi Filistin	Simone Levy	Leading role
2018	Deliler: Fatih'in Fermanı	Alaca	Leading role
2022	Benden Ne Olur?	Harika Bal	Supporting role
2022	Babamın Öldüğü Gün	Sema	Short film
2023	İyi Adamın 10 Günü	Rezzan	Netflix film

== Awards and nominations ==
Year	Award	Category	Title	Result
2011	Ayaklı Newspaper TV Stars Award	Best Supporting Actress	Muhteşem Yüzyıl	Won
2012	Ayaklı Newspaper TV Stars Award	Best Drama Series Supporting Actress of the Year	Muhteşem Yüzyıl	Won
2013	Hotel Association of Turkey's Best Turkish Series Award	Gratitude Award	Muhteşem Yüzyıl	Won
2013	Ayaklı Newspaper TV Stars Award	Best Drama Series Supporting Actress of the Year	Muhteşem Yüzyıl	Won
2017	BIAF (Beirut International Awards Festival)	Best International Actress	Payitaht: Abdülhamid	Won
