= Raci Şaşmaz =

Turkish film producer, writer and actor

- Born: 30 October 1973 (age 52) Elazığ, Turkey
- Occupation: Producer, writer, actor
- Years active: 1998–present
- Relatives: Necati Şaşmaz (brother)

Raci Şaşmaz (born 30 October 1973) is a Turkish film producer, writer and actor.

== Filmography ==
- The Hunter (Turkish: Avci) writer (TV series: 2001)
- Ekmek Teknesi producer & writer (TV series: 2002)
- Valley of the Wolves (Turkish: Kurtlar Vadisi) producer, writer & actor as Ali Candan (TV series: 2003–2005)
- Valley of the Wolves: Iraq (Turkish: Kurtlar Vadisi: Irak) producer & writer (Film: 2006)
- Valley of the Wolves: Terror (Turkish: Kurtlar Vadisi: Terör) producer & writer (TV series: 2007)
- Esref Saati producer & writer (TV series: 2007)
- Valley of the Wolves: Ambush (Turkish: Kurtlar Vadisi: Pusu) producer & writer (TV series: 2007–2014)
- Muro: Damn the Humanist Inside (Turkish: Muro: Nalet Olsun İçimdeki İnsan Sevgisine) producer & writer (Film: 2008)
- Separation (Turkish: Ayrılık) producer & writer (TV series: 2009)
- Valley of the Wolves: Gladio (Turkish: Kurtlar Vadisi: Gladio) producer & writer (Film: 2009)
- Valley of the Wolves: Palestine (Turkish: Kurtlar Vadisi: Filistin) as Polat Alemdar (Film: 2011)
- Bandits Don't Rule the World (Turkish: Eşkıya Dünyaya Hükümdar Olmaz) producer & writer (TV series: 2015–present)
