= Necati Şaşmaz =

Turkish actor (born 1971)

- Born: Muhammed Necati Şaşmaz; 15 December 1971 (age 54); Harput, Elazığ, Turkey
- Occupation: Actor
- Years active: 2003–present
- Spouse(s): Claire B. (m. 2001; div. 2001) Nagehan Kaşıkçı (m. 2012; div. 2021)
- Children: 2
- Relatives: Raci Şaşmaz (brother)

Muhammed Necati Şaşmaz (born 15 December 1971) is a Turkish actor, best known for playing the lead role of Polat Alemdar in the popular television series Kurtlar Vadisi (Valley of the Wolves) and its movie spin-offs, including Kurtlar Vadisi Irak (Valley of the Wolves Iraq).

== Life and career ==
Necati Şaşmaz was born to a family of Zaza origin in Harput, Elazığ, Turkey, as the oldest son of Abdülkadir Şaşmaz. He studied Tourism and Hotel Management, both in Turkey and in Canada. He lived in the United States for six years before returning to Turkey for a visit to his parents before attempting to return to the United States on September 11, 2001. Due to the launch of Operation Yellow Ribbon which was initiated in response to the attacks which took place on the same day, and thus the airplane which he was on returned to Turkey, Şaşmaz was successfully persuaded by his family to not return to the United States and stay in Turkey.

In Istanbul, Necati Şaşmaz met renowned Turkish director Osman Sınav, who offered him the leading role in the Valley of the Wolves. He played the fictional character Polat Alemdar in the series and in the movie. He currently plays in another spin-off of the original series titled Kurtlar Vadisi: Pusu (Valley of the Wolves: Ambush).

He married Nagehan Kaşıkçı in 2012, but filed for divorce in 2019. Their divorce was finalized in 2021.

== Filmography ==
Television
Year	Title	Role	Notes
2003-2005	Kurtlar Vadisi	Polat Alemdar	Leading Role
2005	Ekmek Teknesi	Itself	106. bölümde konuk oyuncu
2007	Kurtlar Vadisi Terör	Polat Alemdar	Leading Role
2007-2016	Kurtlar Vadisi Pusu	Polat Alemdar	Lead, Producer, Concept
2010-2011	Halil İbrahim Sofrası	Itself	Guest star in episodes 1 and 39
2012	Kurt Kanunu	Enver Paşa	Guest star in episode 5
2015	Kara Kutu		Producer
2019	Nöbet		Producer, screenwriter, general director
Cinema
Year	Title	Role	Notes
2006	Kurtlar Vadisi Irak	Polat Alemdar	Leading Role
2011	Kurtlar Vadisi Filistin	Polat Alemdar	Leading Role
2017	Kurtlar Vadisi Vatan	Polat Alemdar	Lead role, producer, screenwriter
Program
Year	Title	Role	Notes
2005	İbo Show	Kendisi	Guest in episode 9
2005	CNN Türk - Tarafsız Bölge	Kendisi	Guest
2006	32. Gün	Kendisi	Guest in episode 670
2009	Saba Tümer'le Bu Gece	Kendisi	Guest
2009	32. Gün	Kendisi	Guest in episode 782
2009	Beyaz Show	Kendisi	Guest
2009	Sen Türkülerini Söyle	Kendisi	Guest
2010	Şeffaf Oda	Kendisi	Guest
2010	atv - Dizi TV	Kendisi	Guest in episode 31
2011	Burada Laf Çok	Kendisi	Guest
2011	Serkan Çağrı ile Seyyare	Kendisi	Guest
2011	NTV	Kendisi	Guest
2012	Sırma İle Bugün	Kendisi	Guest
2012	Eşref Vakti	Kendisi	Guest
2013	Kadir Çöpdemir İle Koptu Geliyor	Kendisi	Guest
2017	Akılda Kalan	Kendisi	Guest
2022	Mazhar Alanson İle	Kendisi	Guest in episode 28
2022	İbo Show	Kendisi	Guest in episode 31
