= Bitter Life (TV series) =

- Genre: Drama
- Starring: Kenan İmirzalıoğlu; Selin Demiratar
- Composer: Aytug Yargiç
- Country of origin: Turkey
- Original language: Turkish
- No. of episodes: 59

Original release
- Network: Show TV
- Release: July 14, 2005 – June 25, 2007

Bitter Life (Turkish: Acı Hayat) is a Turkish TV series that was initially broadcast by Show TV in 2005. It is a television adaptation of the original 1962 film.

== Plot ==
Mehmet and Nermin are desperately in love with each other. Both are living in the suburbs of Istanbul, trying to stay one step ahead of poverty by working harder each day. Their only aim is to get married and have a nice home. While Mehmet works as a welder in a shipyard, Nermin is a manicurist in one of the well known coiffeurs. But no matter how hard they try, they just never earn enough money to realize their dream. Ender, one of Istanbul's playboys sees Nermin and falls in love with her. Nermin, not being able to realise her dreams, gets upset, drunk and makes the biggest mistake of her life and spends the night with Ender. She has no other choice than to marry him. She leaves her old poor life and her only real love behind and starts a new life in richness with Ender. Heartbroken, Mehmet, decides to get revenge on Ender for taking his only love from him. He knows that Ender's family are rich and evil, so he decides to become rich as well, by stealing money from them, to be able to beat them in their own game. But despite all the things Mehmet goes through, he can't forget Nermin's love and pines for her. Even though he thinks Nermin betrayed him for money, he remains madly in love with her. He fights for his lost love until the end.

== Cast ==
- Kenan İmirzalıoğlu as Mehmet Kosovalı
- Selin Demiratar as Nermin Yıldız
- Oguz Galeli as Ender Kervancıoğlu
- Ebru Kocaağa as Filiz Kervancıoğlu
- Ahmet Yenilmez as Hasan Cin
- Ekin Türkmen as Özlem Kosovalı
- Murat Soydan as Celal Kosovalı
- Meral Orhonsay as Sultan Kosovalı
- Ferdi Merter as Sefa Kervancıoğlu
- Anta Toros as Belkıs Kervancıoğlu
