= Zahra's Blue Eyes =

Iranian television series

Zahra's Blue Eyes (Persian: جشمهاى آبى زهرا), also titled For You, Palestine, is a Syrian–Iranian television series which premiered in 2004 on Sahar 1. It was created by Ali Derakhshi, a former official of the Iranian Education Ministry. Set in the West Bank, the plot of the series mostly centers around Israeli military and civilians conspiring to steal the eyes of Palestinian children. It was made in Persian but also dubbed into Arabic for further broadcast.

In 2006, it was also shown in Turkish in Germany on Milli Görüs’ TV5. In February 2005, the French Broadcasting Authority ordered the French satellite provider Eutelsat to stop transmitting broadcasts from the Iranian satellite TV channel Sahar 1 because of its broadcast of the series. It was distributed as four VCDs by Vakit, a newspaper in Turkey. In 2017, it was televised on Akit TV, a satellite channel in Turkey.

== Plot ==
The series depicts Israeli doctors harvesting organs from Palestinian children and focuses on the campaign of fictional prime-ministerial candidate Yitzhak Cohen, who declares in a speech that Jews "are the best of the races in the world". Cohen becomes obsessed with seizing the eyes of a young Palestinian girl named Zahra. To this end, Israelis pose as United Nations employees who come to a Palestinian school and check children in order to "prevent the spreading of an eye disease" but really want to inspect the class for students with the best eyes. After an extremely graphic surgery, Zahra is left blind by the Israeli doctors.

In episode two of the series, it is revealed that the Israeli president is being kept alive by organs stolen from Palestinian children, and an Israeli military commander is seen kidnapping UN employees and Palestinians.

All of the Israeli antagonists are dressed in the traditional clothing of religious Jews throughout the series, and the "Israeli" soldiers wear uniforms that are very different from IDF uniforms in actuality. All of the Jewish characters in the series are portrayed as villains, with the exception of an Ethiopian Jew who helps Zahra after she briefly escapes the "Evil Zionist Palace" and is killed for it shortly after.

Multiple protagonists declare the land of Israel to belong to the Palestinians often throughout the series.

== Episodes ==
1. Preparations for Stealing Palestinian Children's Organs
2. Palestinian Children Are taken to Israeli Hospital
3. Zahra Is Taken to Yitzhak and Theodor Cohen's Mansion
4. Zionists Prepare to Implant Zahra's Eyes in Theodor
5. Zahra Escapes Evil Zionist Palace
6. A Good Jew Helps Zahra, Before He is Murdered.
7. Zahra Is Blinded, Rest of Characters Are Killed

== International reactions ==
Zahra's Blue Eyes and other original series from Sahar TV were banned in France. The series has received condemnation outside of the Middle East due to its usage of heavily anti-Semitic depictions of Jewish people, particularly Israelis. Additionally, 15 members of the United States Congress, both Democrats and Republicans (including Tom Lantos, then the only Holocaust survivor sitting in the legislature), wrote to the director of the Interests Section of the Islamic Republic of Iran to condemn the series.

In her book entitled Because They Hate, Lebanese American author and activist Brigitte Gabriel wrote of the series: "Did this fellow (the producer) get a peek at the screenplay for the movie The Island, in which people are raised for spare body parts, or did he just catch a preview of coming attractions? As Goebbels said: 'If you repeat a lie long enough it becomes the truth.' That's taqiyya at its best. Or worst, depending on your moral compass."

== See also ==
- Ayrılık
- Kurtlar Vadisi
