= Uzun Hikâye =

- Directed by: Osman Sınav
- Written by: Yiğit Güralp (screenplay); Mustafa Kutlu (book)
- Produced by: Suat Kapkı; Taner Özbel
- Starring: Kenan İmirzalıoğlu; Tuğçe Kazaz; Mustafa Alabora; Damla Sönmez
- Cinematography: Vedat Özdemir
- Edited by: Murat Önal
- Music by: Ulaş Özdemir
- Release date: October 12, 2012
- Running time: 125 min.
- Country: Turkey
- Language: Turkish

Uzun Hikâye (A Long Story) is a 2012 Turkish drama film, co-produced by Suat Kapkı and Taner Özbel written by Yiğit Güralp and directed by Osman Sınav based on a novella by Mustafa Kutlu. The movie premiered on October 12, 2012.

== Plot ==
The movie, spanning a time from the 1940s to the 1970s, features a dramatic as well as bright and charged story.

After becoming orphan at an early age, Ali (starring Kenan İmirzalıoğlu) immigrates to Turkey from Bulgaria with his oil wrestler grandfather Süleyman. Settled at Eyüp in Istanbul, he is raised by his grandfather as a brave and equalitarian individual.

During his teen years in the 1950s, Ali falls in love with Münire (starring Tuğçe Kazaz), the daughter of an outdoor cinema owner. Ali abducts Münire as her parents does not allow their marriage. From then on, Ali spends a life together with the woman he loves, moving from town to town at railway stations. In the meantime, the couple welcome a son they name Mustafa. Ali, nicknamed now "the Socialist", earns a living by his typewriting and accounting knowledge. He is, however, sacked by plotting towners because of his intolerant character against injustice and discrimination. Meanwhile, Mustafa is growing and pursues his own life stories.

== Cast ==
- Kenan İmirzalıoğlu as Ali
- Damla Sönmez as Ayla
- Tuğçe Kazaz as Minüre
- Altan Erkekli as Emin Efendi
- Güven Kıraç as Conductor
- Zafer Algöz as Şeref
- Cihat Tamer as Schoolmaster
- Mahir Günşiray as Prosecutor
- Mustafa Alabora as Mayor
- Kürşat Alnıaçık
- Şener Kökkaya
- Osman Alkaş
- Cengiz Bozkurt
- Mustafa Üstündağ
- Erkan Avcı
- İsmail Hakkı Ürün
- Bora Koçak
- Ushan Çakır as Mustafa
- Batuhan Karacakaya as Mustafa (15 years old)
- Taha Yusuf Tan as Mustafa (5 years old)
- Elif Atakan as Feride
