= Valley of the Wolves (TV series) =

Turkish crime drama television series (2003–2005)

- Valley of the Wolves title card
- Genre: Action; Crime drama Political drama
- Created by: Osman Sınav
- Written by: Raci Şaşmaz (1-97); Bahadır Özdener (1-97); Mehmet Turgut (21-55)
- Directed by: Osman Sınav (1-55); Mustafa Şevki Doğan (21-55); Serdar Akar (55-97)
- Starring: Necati Şaşmaz; Özgü Namal; Selçuk Yöntem; Oktay Kaynarca; Gürkan Uygun
- Music by: Gökhan Kırdar
- Country of origin: Turkey
- No. of seasons: 4
- No. of episodes: 97

Production
- Producers: Osman Sınav (2003-2004); Raci Şaşmaz (2004-2005)
- Production locations: Istanbul, Turkey (seasons 1–4); Northern Cyprus (season 3); Aleppo, Syria (season 4); Los Angeles, California (season 4)
- Cinematography: Tevfik Şenol (1-55); Selahattin Sancaklı (55-97)
- Editor: Kemalettin Osmanlı
- Production companies: Sinegraf (2003-2004); Pana Film (2004-2005)

Original release
- Network: Show TV
- Release: 15 January 2003 – 9 June 2005
- Network: Kanal D
- Release: 6 October – 29 December 2005

Related
- Valley of the Wolves: Iraq; Valley of the Wolves: Terror; Valley of the Wolves: Ambush; Muro: Damn the Humanist Inside; Valley of the Wolves: Gladio; Valley of the Wolves: Palestine; Valley of the Wolves: Homeland

Valley of the Wolves (Turkish: Kurtlar Vadisi) is a Turkish crime drama television series created by Osman Sınav and Raci Şaşmaz, which originally aired on Show TV. The show focuses on the protagonist Agent Polat Alemdar, an undercover operative who joins the mafia and becomes the partner of a known mafia gunman, Süleyman Çakır. The show makes direct and indirect references to Turkish politics. The show was subsequently acquired by Kanal D for its final season.

Valley of the Wolves became the most successful TV show in Turkey. Multiple successful feature films were made based on the show, including Valley of the Wolves: Iraq, Valley of the Wolves: Gladio and Valley of the Wolves: Palestine.

Guest appearances for the series included Rauf Denktaş, founding president of Northern Cyprus; as well as Andy García and Sharon Stone.

== Premise ==
Ali Candan (played by Raci Şaşmaz), who has carried out many successful operations abroad on behalf of the KGT, was called back to Turkey while he was in Kosovo by his superior, Aslan Akbey (Selçuk Yöntem), and assigned his most critical mission: the Valley of the Wolves Operation. The goal of this mission is to dismantle the Wolves’ Council, the most powerful mafia organization, of which Mehmet Karahanlı (Zafer Ergin) is the baron. This task is no easy feat, as the Wolves’ Council is incredibly powerful, controlling an amount of money equivalent to half of Turkey’s annual national income.

== Production ==
=== Conception ===
In June 2002, Show TV asked director Osman Sınav to create a Turkish version of the American series Wiseguy. The Deli Yürek series had just finished, and the director and writers had no specific project in mind. However, when they learned that the series was based on a show they had frequently watched, they realized it was something they were already familiar with, and they began working on the script.

At the request of Raci Şaşmaz, Soner Yalçın joined the show as a concept consultant. It was agreed that the series would not carry over any elements from Deli Yürek and would instead take a completely different, unprecedented approach.

Even six years after the Susurluk scandal, the public was still curious about the deep state, the mafia, the underground world, and their interconnections. This curiosity helped shape the theme of the show.

By July 2002, the general framework of the series began to take shape. One of the unique aspects was that the lead actor would not appear in the first episode but would start playing the role in the second episode after a face change. Another distinctive feature was that many key actors, who would play significant roles later in the series, appeared very briefly or not at all in the first season.

Osman Sınav initially wanted a softer title, but after insistence from Raci Şaşmaz and Soner Yalçın, the title of the series was decided upon.

The characters were largely inspired by real people. As the writers worked on the script, they kept track of current events (such as the Iraq War, the 1 March motion, etc.), and these events were incorporated into the show. While the writers had major disagreements on certain contemporary issues, they only wrote the parts they had reached a consensus on.

=== Casting ===
When Osman Sınav’s new project was announced, many people assumed Kenan İmirzalioğlu would be cast as the lead. However, Sınav offered the role to Cenk Torun, who turned it down without asking any questions about it. In the end, Osman Sınav chose Necati Şaşmaz, who had no prior acting experience, for the role.

The role of Elif, the female lead, was initially offered to Oylum Talu, but she declined. After that, Özgü Namal was considered for the role. At the time, she was dating Oktay Kaynarca, but after both sides agreed, she was cast.

The team worked with Abidin Yerebakan to arrange the weapons for the casino scenes, and they reached an agreement to have him appear in the series in exchange. Although Yerebakan didn’t keep his part of the deal, he played the role of Abidin Seferoğlu in the series, marking his acting debut.

Great care was taken in selecting the cast for the council roles, with all the actors chosen from the State Theatre artists.

== Episodes ==
Series	Episodes	Originally released		
Series	Episodes	First released	Last released	Network
1	20	15 January 2003	18 June 2003	Show TV
2	35	2 October 2003	24 June 2004	Show TV
3	31	23 September 2004	9 June 2005	Show TV
4	11	6 October 2005	29 December 2005	Kanal D

=== Season 1 ===
Ali Candan (Raci Şaşmaz), after saying goodbye to all his loved ones for a difficult mission he’s been assigned, is shown to have "died" in a car accident and undergoes surgery to receive a new face. He’s given a new identity: Polat Alemdar (Necati Şaşmaz). Polat is presented as the nephew of an old mobster, Duran Emmi, allowing him to infiltrate the mafia world. One day, Süleyman Çakır (Oktay Kaynarca), a hitman in the hierarchy of the Wolves’ Council who performs assassinations on behalf of the council, goes to visit Duran Emmi at his café in Salacak. There, he meets Polat for the first time. As Çakır and Emmi are leaving the café, they’re attacked by Çakır’s rival, Şevko. Sensing the ambush, Polat quickly pushes both Çakır and Emmi to the ground, saving their lives. From that moment, Çakır and Polat become blood brothers and carry out many successful operations together.

=== Season 2 ===
Polat’s successes catch the attention of the Wolves’ Council, and he gradually meets its members, including Mehmet Karahanlı, Laz Ziya, Kılıç, and Testere Necmi.

=== Season 3 ===
Eventually, like Çakır, Polat begins working for the council and rises in its ranks until he becomes its baron. Along the way, while eliminating many enemies—such as Pala and his team, Kirve, the Russian Council, and other harmful groups—Polat also loses several close friends, including Süleyman Çakır, Aslan Akbey (Selçuk Yöntem), Seyfo Dayı (Nihat Nikerel), and Elif Eylül (Özgü Namal).

=== Season 4 ===
In 2005, the Wolves’ Council collapses due to internal conflicts and other factors, with its last member, Nizamettin Güvenç, is hanged by Polat Alemdar. This marks the successful conclusion of the "Valley of the Wolves" operation. After the council’s fall, Polat travels to Los Angeles to meet Amon (Andy Garcia), the World Baron of the Templars, to whom the council was secretly connected. Amon proposes an alliance and requests documents kept in a cryptic device called the Cryptex, which contains records of the council’s activities against Turkey and other connected entities. However, Polat refuses Amon’s request, makes an agreement with him, and returns to Turkey.

== Cast and characters ==
=== Main characters ===
Actor	Character	About
Necati Şaşmaz	Polat Alemdar	An intelligence agent trained by Aslan Akbey the spymaster to bringing down the Turkish mafia.
Özgü Namal	Elif Eylül	Ali Candan's girlfriend, lawyer
Selçuk Yöntem	Aslan Akbey	Polat's mentor. Controls the KGT. Trained by Doğu Eşrefoğlu.
Oktay Kaynarca	Süleyman Çakır	A crime boss at the head of the Istanbul mafia, who later became friends with Polat Alemdar.
Gürkan Uygun	Memati Baş	Süleyman Çakır's right arm.
Nihat Nikerel	Seyfo Dayı	Loyal man of rowdy Duran Şatıroğlu. Full name: Seyfullah Yördem
Kenan Çoban	Abdülhey Çoban	Polat Alemdar's fellow.
Erhan Ufak	Güllü Erhan	Nephew of Seyfo Dayı (Uncle Seyfo). Full name:Erhan Ufuk
İpek Tenolcay	Nesrin Çakır	Süleyman Çakır's wife and Laz Ziya's older daughter.
Seray Sever	Derya Çakır	Çakır's sister.
Müge Ulusoy	Meral Yılmaz	Nesrin Çakır's sister, Laz Ziya's younger daughter.
Hande Kazanova	Canan Çavan	Elif's friend, also a lawyer.
Begüm Kütük	Safiye Karahanlı	Mehmet Karahanlı's daughter. Uses the name Sophie in Canada.
Güven Hokna	Nergiz Karahanlı	Mehmet Karahanlı's wife and Safiye's mother.
Altan Akışık	Doğu Eşrefoğlu	Aslan Akbey's mentor.
Emin Olcay	Ömer Candan	Polat's non-biological father
İnci Melis Pars / Serpil Tamur	Nazife Candan	Polat's non-biological mother

=== Council of the Wolves ===
Actor	Character	About
Zafer Ergin	Mehmet Karahanlı	Don of the Turkish mafia and Baron of the council.
Attila Olgaç	Kılıç	Right arm and the consigliere of Karahanlı.
İstemi Betil	Laz Ziya	Leading gun smuggler of the council.
Baykal Saran	Hüsrev Ağa	Leading drug trafficker of the council.
Tarık Ünlüoğlu	Testere Necmi	Leading executioner of the council. Karahanlı's left arm.
Nişan Şirinyan	Samuel Vanunu	Responsible for the foreign policies of the council.
Adnan Biricik	Nizamettin Güvenç	Responsible for the legal matters regarding the council.
Haldun Boysan	Tombalacı Mehmet	Responsible for the casinos.
İsmail İncekara	İplikçi Nedim	Operates the money of the council members, joined later.
Osman Wöber	Tuncay Kantarcı	Runs the customs for the council, joined later
Sönmez Atasoy	Halil İbrahim Kapar	Drug trafficker of the council, joined later.
