= List of Turkish films of 2007 =

A list of films produced by the Turkish film industry in Turkey in 2007.

== Highest-grossing films ==
Highest-grossing Turkish films of 2007
Rank	Title	English title	Studio	Gross
1	Kabadayı	For Love and Honor		$10,161,213
2	Beyaz Melek	The White Angel	Medyavizyon	$9,759,677
3	Maskeli Beşler: Irak	The Masked Gang: Iraq	Arzu Film / Fida Film	$6,563,123
4	Son Osmanlı Yandım Ali	The Last Ottoman: Knockout Ali		$5,803,454
5	Çılgın Dersane	Cool School	Aksoy Film	$4,265,287
6	Kutsal Damacana	Kutsal Damacana	Zero Film	$3,721,075
7	Mutluluk	Bliss		$3,565,322
8	Amerikalılar Karadeniz'de 2	Americans at the Black Sea	Energy Medya	$2,243,249
9	Pars: Kiraz Operasyonu	Pars: Operation Cherry	Sinegraf	$2,093,804
