= Sahar TV =

Iranian international television channel

Coordinates: 35°47′4.22″N 51°24′43.78″E

- Broadcast area: Worldwide
- Headquarters: Islamic Republic of Iran Broadcasting; Tehran; Iran

Programming
- Languages: Urdu, Azeri, Kurdish, Bosnian
- Picture format: 16:9 (576i, SDTV)

Ownership
- Sister channels: Sahar Azeri; Sahar Balkan; Sahar Kurdish; Sahar Urdu

History
- Launched: 16 December 1997

Links
- Website: Sahar TV website

Sahar TV (Persian: شبکه سحر, Shabake-e Sahar, SAHARTV), is the name of an Iranian TV channels that is part of Sahar Universal Network (SUN) which is the branch of Islamic Republic of Iran Broadcasting responsible for broadcasting programs internationally via its Azeri, Balkan, Kurdish, and Urdu language television channels.

It broadcasts to Europe, Central Asia and the Caucasus, some parts of Northern Africa, Oceania, and all the countries in the subcontinent of India and Eastern Asia.

== History ==
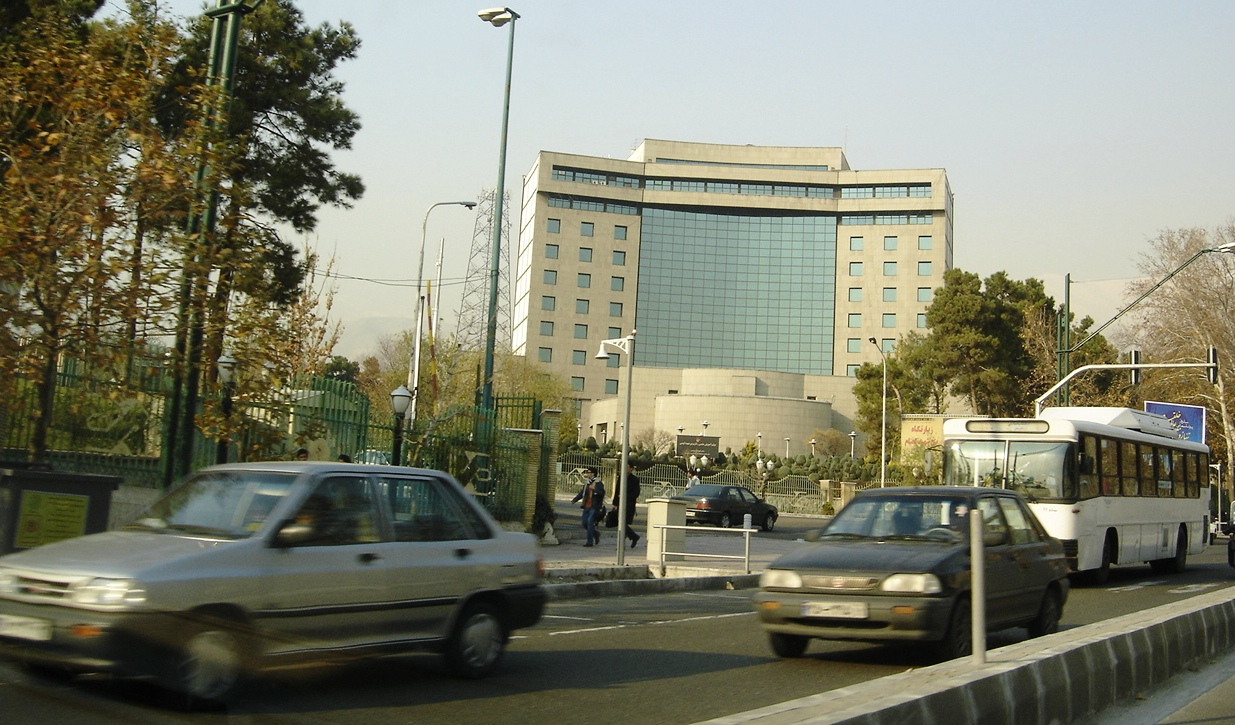
IRIB's northeast gate along Vali Asr Ave.

On 16 December 1997, Sahar Universal Network began broadcasting English programs for one hour a day. It gradually increased its airtime up to 4 hours a day.

Although the main function of English TV is to propagate the Islamic educations, the structure of the topics and genres of programs in English TV are varied. Programming is not restricted to politics and news, but scientific and social documentaries, clips, and game shows also.

== Controversy ==
In February 2005, French-based Eutelsat banned all broadcasts of Sahar TV by the orders of the administrative court, due to the channel's alleged incitement of antisemitism by broadcasting the Syrian TV series Zahra's Blue Eyes, which was produced by the Lebanese TV station, Al-Manar, owned by Hezbollah organization. Iraqi information director Nazar Heydar cited the French ban has violated human rights conventions.
