= The Last Ottoman =

- Theatrical poster
- Directed by: Mustafa Şevki Doğan
- Written by: Suat Yalaz; Mehmet Soyarslan; Baykut Badem
- Produced by: Mehmet Soyarslan
- Starring: Kenan İmirzalıoğlu; Cansu Dere; Engin Şenkan
- Cinematography: Zekeriya Kurtuluş
- Distributed by: Özen Film
- Release date: January 19, 2007
- Running time: 121 mins
- Country: Turkey
- Language: Turkish

The Last Ottoman: Knockout Ali (Turkish: Son Osmanlı Yandım Ali) is a 2007 Turkish action film, directed by Mustafa Şevki Doğan based on the book by Suat Yalaz, starring Kenan İmirzalıoğlu as the titular hero Tahtacızade "Yandım" Ali, who is inspired by the landing of Mustafa Kemal at Samsun and decides to join the resistance movement fighting against the occupation of Constantinople in the aftermath of the First World War. The film, which went on general release across Turkey on January 19, 2007, is the fourth highest grossing Turkish film of 2007.

== Production ==
"Yandım Ali is a great hero and heroism is something which always appeals to us. Maybe we follow this path because we know the make-up of our people and know there is a majority that likes nationalist films", director Mustafa Şevki Doğan told Reuters.

The film was shot on location in Istanbul and Bahçeşehir, Turkey.

== Plot ==
The film is set in the years after World War I when the Ottoman capital of Constantinople was under the siege by the enemy. A navy sergeant named Tahtacızade Ali (Kenan İmirzalıoğlu), who has just completed his military service, is yearning for his fiancée Defne (Cansu Dere) who married another man while Ali was away. Ali plans to abduct Defne and flee to Vienna. However, Ali's plans change when he comes across Mustafa Kemal, who has just set on a journey to save the Turkish land from the enemy. Ali recognizes that his real love is his country, and joins in the endeavors to save his country.

== Main cast ==
- Kenan İmirzalıoğlu as Tahtacızade "Yandım" Ali
- Cansu Dere as Defne
- Engin Şenkan as Çukurçeşmeli Osman Bey
- Anna Babkova as Nadia
- Alican Yücesoy as Mustafa Kemal
- Baykut Badem as Kelle
- Öner Erkan as Gerard (Jerar)
- Kim Feenstra as Collette (French teacher)

== Release ==
=== Festival Screenings ===
- 31st Cairo International Film Festival (Nov. 27-Dec. 7, 2007)
