= Hood event =

2003 incident in Iraq involving Turkish and American troops

The Hood event (Turkish: Çuval olayı) was a 2003 military incident involving Turkey and the United States shortly after the American-led invasion of Iraq. On July 4, 2003, a group of Turkish soldiers operating in Iraqi Kurdistan were captured by American troops and, with hoods covering their heads, were led away to be interrogated. Afterwards, American soldiers raided a Turkish safehouse in Sulaymaniyah and seized 15 kilograms (33 lb) of explosives in addition to sniper rifles, grenades, and maps of Kirkuk with circles drawn around positions near the local governor's building. Turkey lodged a diplomatic protest with the United States, and the Turkish soldiers were then released after spending 60 hours in American custody. Turkey has been involved in a long-running conflict with the Kurds, and one Iraqi-Kurdish intelligence official claimed that the Turkish soldiers had been linked to a plot to assassinate the newly elected governor of Kirkuk in order to destabilize the region, opening the way for the Turkish military to intervene.

Neither side has issued a formal apology, though a U.S.–Turkish investigative commission later issued a joint statement of regret. Additionally, Donald Rumsfeld expressed sorrow over the incident in a letter to Recep Tayyip Erdoğan. The Hood event severely damaged Turkey–United States relations; both countries are strategic allies under NATO. While the incident received comparatively little coverage in the United States, it was a major event in Turkey. It became known as the "Hood event" (referring to the manner in which the Turkish soldiers were taken away) in Turkey, and many Turkish citizens saw it as a deliberate insult.

== Background ==
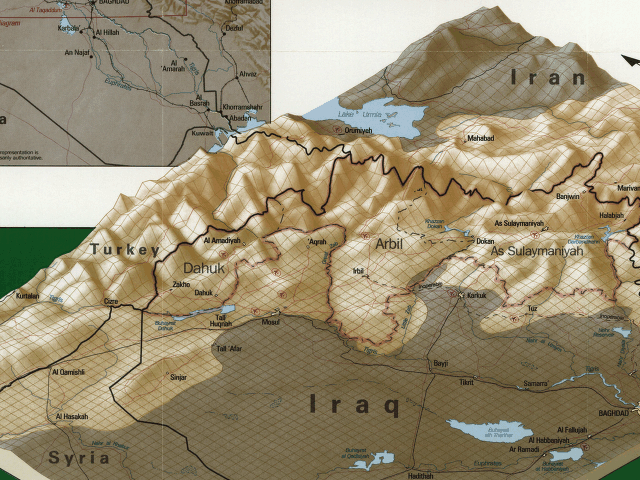
A map of the Kurdish-inhabited areas of Iraq bordering Turkey.

Turkey had long viewed northern Iraq, with its large mountain ranges, as a possible national security threat. During the 1980s and 1990s, Turkey fought against PKK, operating mainly in southeastern Turkey. More than 30,000 people were killed and millions more were displaced. During the war, the PKK established bases in Iraq and Syria.

Turkish fears intensified after Iraqi Kurdistan gained autonomy after the 1991 Gulf War. In 1996, after a civil war had broken out there, Turkey deployed troops there to monitor a ceasefire between the two main Kurdish factions. In 1998, Turkey was able to use military threats to force neighboring Syria to expel PKK leader Abdullah Öcalan. However, because of the United States, it was never able to move decisively against the PKK in northern Iraq.

Under American protection, Iraqi Kurdistan had evolved into a semi-autonomous region. U.S. pressure helped lead to a peace deal in 1999 between the major Iraqi Kurdish factions, the Patriotic Union of Kurdistan and the Kurdistan Democratic Party of Iraq. While both parties officially swore off independence, the Turkish government remained sufficiently concerned, and continued to keep troops in northern Iraq.

== Turkey and the U.S. invasion of Iraq ==
By 2003, many Turks had come to see American foreign policy in the region as a threat. The election in 2002 of the Justice and Development Party (AKP) gave hopes that relations could be improved, especially given AKP leader Recep Tayyip Erdogan's positive comments regarding the US-Turkish cooperation in the Middle East, specifically concerning the so-called "Greater Middle East Project". However, shortly after the election of the AKP, tensions with America increased, due to the Parliament's decision not to send any Turkish troops to Iraq. 70% of the parliament members were Justice and Development Party members. Although more than half of AKP members voted to authorize the troop deployment, a significant minority of the AKP along with almost all of the main opposition CHP voted against it. It was considered Erdogan's first significant political defeat as part of the AKP given his vocal support for the authorization before the vote.

On April 24, 2003, only two weeks after the fall of Baghdad, a dozen Turkish special forces were arrested in Da Quq, a tribal village 45 minutes north of Kirkuk. According to Time, a weekly news magazine, they were wearing civilian clothes and intended to infiltrate Iraq, lagging behind a humanitarian convoy, in order to destabilize the region to a level where Turkey could reasonably send its own peacekeeping force. However, they were intercepted by American forces, who claimed they had received prior knowledge of the group.

Colonel Bill Mayville, a U.S. brigade commander who was responsible for the region where this took place, accused the Turks of having links to the Iraqi Turkmen Front (ITF), an ethnic-Turkish militia. US forces showed no intention to hold the Turks for very long, merely detaining them for a day, with food, security and comfort, and then escorting them back to the Iraqi-Turkish border. In the following months, Turkey continued its policy of sending small groups of soldiers into Iraqi Kurdistan, ostensibly to search for PKK bases. According to The Economist, Turkey also began covertly arming the ITF as a lever against the PKK.

== U.S. raid on a Turkish safehouse in Sulaymaniyah ==
On July 4, 2003, soldiers from the United States Army's 173d Airborne Brigade raided a safehouse in the Iraqi Kurdish city of Sulaymaniyah. They seemed to have acted on an intelligence tip that there were individuals in the safehouse plotting to assassinate the Iraqi-Kurdish governor of the province of Kirkuk. The safehouse instead housed members of the Iraqi Turkmen Front and Turkish Special Forces soldiers, including a colonel and two majors, whom they promptly arrested. Turkish sources refer to eleven soldiers commanded by a major. An unknown number of other individuals were also detained during the raid, although thirteen were later released. Apart from these, and the Turkish soldiers who were to be released after intense diplomatic activity, a British citizen named Michael Todd, who was in the area looking for his girlfriend and their 19-month-old daughter, was also taken into custody.

== Bilateral negotiations ==
The Turkish military immediately threatened retaliatory measures, including closing Turkish airspace to US military flights, stopping the use of the southern Incirlik Air Base and sending more troops into northern Iraq. A delegation of Turkish military and diplomatic officials immediately left for Sulaymaniyah on Saturday to discuss the matter with the Americans, but, according to the Turks, most of the American commanders were off celebrating Independence Day. Following direct protests by Turkish Prime Minister Recep Tayyip Erdoğan to US Vice President Dick Cheney, as well as by Turkish Foreign Minister Abdullah Gül to US Secretary of State Colin Powell, the Turkish soldiers were released after sixty hours in captivity.

== Aftermath and media coverage ==
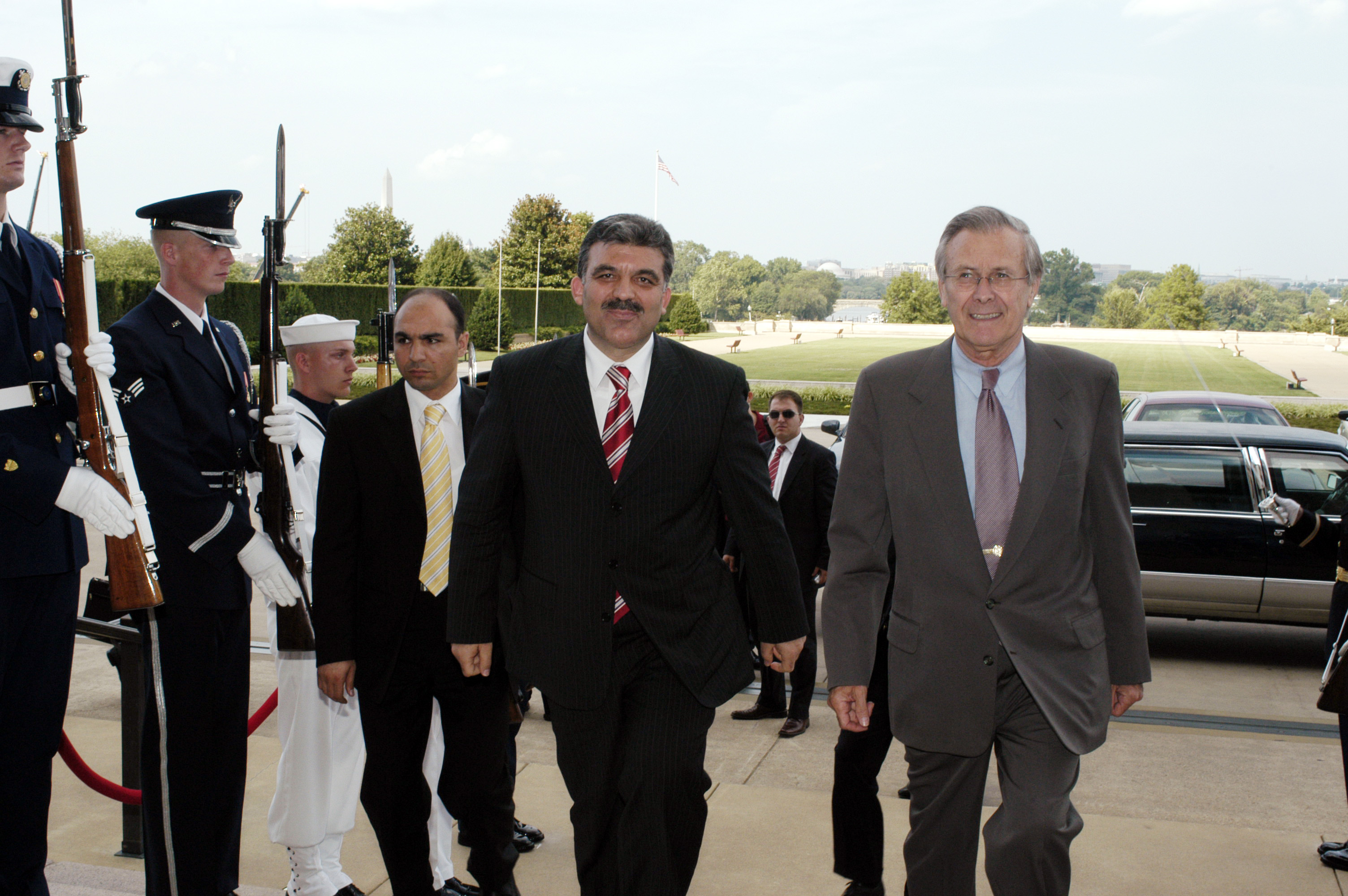
On 2003-07-24, Gül and Rumsfeld met at the Pentagon.

The Hood event made a much greater impact in Turkey than in the West, which by and large agreed with the U.S. government's interpretation. While the story received comparatively little coverage outside of the Middle East, Turkish newspapers loudly condemned the raid, referring to U.S. forces with nicknames such as "Rambos" and "Ugly Americans". On the last day of the incident, Hilmi Özkök, Chief of the General Staff (Turkey), declared that the Hood event had caused a "crisis of confidence" between the US and Turkey.

The event periodically gets front coverage in the Turkish media, such as in the mass-circulation daily Hürriyet, in keeping with new declarations made to the press by the involved parties and new details divulged. Most recently, the key witness in the Ergenekon investigation, Tuncay Güney, alleged that the event was the U.S. response to the discovery of documents about the clandestine Ergenekon network's Iraq connection in the archives of Tariq Aziz.

The Hood event was the inspiration for the 2006 Turkish action film Valley of the Wolves Iraq. The film opens with a rough depiction of the Hood event, following with a fictional story in which the Turkish protagonist seeks retaliation against the American commander responsible for the incident.

== Claims ==
Various municipal and government buildings were set on fire in Mosul and Kirkuk by Kurdish forces on 10 and 11 April 2003. A Turkish daily newspaper reported that the Turkish Special Forces soldiers, who were captured by US Army, had already filmed the deed records and sent the digital records to Turkey before the historical records were terminated. The newspaper also reported that the US party was, in fact, in search of those records, but they were unable to find them. However, Turkish Ministry of Public Works declared that the ministry archives holds historical deed records from the Ottoman era and there were no operations involved.

Retired Department of Intelligence Chief of General Staff of the Republic of Turkey, Korg. İsmail Hakki Pekin, claims in his book named "Dikkat Cemaat Çıkabilir KOZMİK ODA" that, after the secret archives about Turkmens captured during the raid, local Turkmen leaders were assassinated or died in suspicious traffic accidents.

== See also ==
- Human rights in post-invasion Iraq
