= For Love and Honor =

- Theatrical poster
- Directed by: Ömer Vargı
- Written by: Yavuz Turgul
- Produced by: Ömer Vargı; Murat Akdilek; Mine Vargı
- Starring: Şener Şen; Kenan İmirzalıoğlu; İsmail Hacıoğlu; Aslı Tandoğan; Rasim Öztekin
- Cinematography: Frenc Pap
- Music by: Michael Vickerage & Benjamin Walken Beladi
- Distributed by: Fida Film
- Release date: December 14, 2007
- Running time: 140 min.
- Country: Turkey
- Language: Turkish

For Love and Honor (Turkish: Kabadayı) is a 2007 Turkish drama film, written by Yavuz Turgul and directed by Ömer Vargı, starring Şener Şen as a retired gangster who learns that he has a son in need of protection. The film, which went on nationwide general release across Turkey on December 14, 2007, was the highest-grossing Turkish film of 2007.

== Plot ==
Ali Osman is a retired Kabadayı (old school gangster) who learns that he has a son Murat. Murat works in a bar and his girlfriend Karaca also works there as a singer. Murat has a run-in with a Mob Boss named Devran who tries to shut down the place. From that moment on, Devran swears to avenge Murat and Karaca and it is up to Ali Osman to protect them.

== Cast ==
- Şener Şen as Ali Osman, A retired gangster who learn that he has a son
- Kenan İmirzalıoğlu as Devran, Main Villain, mob boss and informant for police. In love with Karaca
- İsmail Hacıoğlu as Murat, Ali Osman's son. In love with Karaca
- Aslı Tandoğan as Karaca, Singer, in love with Murat
- Rasim Öztekin as Sürmeli, Ali Osman`friend
- Ruhi Sarı as Selim
- Süleyman Turan as Cemil
- Ulgar Manzakoğlu as Boss, Villain, Devran boss
- Tarık Ünlüoğlu as Gölge

== Reception ==
It was watched by 920,000 in the first 10 days of its release and by over 2 million people in Turkey at the end its theatrical run.
