= Selçuk Yöntem =

Turkish actor and TV presenter

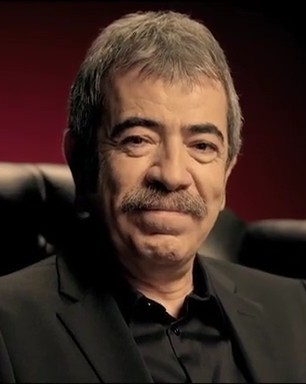
- Born: Akif Selçuk Yöntem; 13 July 1953 (age 73); Istanbul, Turkey
- Occupations: Actor, TV presenter
- Years active: 1972–present
- Spouses: Zuhal Olcay (m. 1976; div. 1979); Cihan Yöntem (m. 1987)
- Children: 1

Selçuk Yöntem (born 13 July 1953) is a Turkish actor and TV presenter.

== Life and career ==
Yöntem was born on 13 July 1953 in Eyüpsultan, Istanbul. His mother was from Erzurum and his father was from Sakarya. In 1976, he graduated from Ankara State Conservatory with a degree in theatre studies. In 1977 started working in the same institution. In 1994, Yöntem took the play Aşağıdakiler on stage, followed by Gürültülü Patırtılı Bir Hikâye in 1995. Between 1997 and 1998, he directed an adaptation of Haldun Taner's play Ay Işığında Şamata. Aside from his career on stage, he joined TRT Istanbul Radio and took part in presenting radio plays.

He simultaneously continued a career in television and cinema, and for his performance in the movie C Blok, he was given the "Best Supporting Actor" award. After his portrayal of the Bozo character in Deli Yürek TV series and its follow-up movie, in 2003 he joined the cast of Kurtlar Vadisi as Aslan Akbey.

Another breakthrough came with his role in the 2008 drama series Aşk-ı Memnu as Adnan Ziyagil. He also presented about 400 episodes of Büyük Risk on Star TV and then on Show TV. In 2013, he was cast in ATV's series Bugünün Saraylısı, playing the role of Ata Katipoğlu.

He also presented the popular game show Kim Milyoner Olmak İster? in 2014, after the former presenter Kenan Işık suffered from a stroke.

== Filmography ==
Year	Title	Role	Notes
1984	Ellis Adası		TV series
1991	Suyun Öte Yanı		
1993	Süper Baba	Celal	TV series
1993	Yaz Yağmuru		
1993	C-Blok	Selim	
1994	Şehnaz Tango		TV series
1996	80. Adım		
1996	İstanbul Kanatlarımın Altında		
1998	Ateş Dansı	Nuri	TV series
1998	Deli Yürek	Bozo (2002)	TV series
1998	Çiçeği Büyütmek		TV series
1998	Sıcak Saatler	Süleyman Uslu	TV series
1998	Kaçıklık Diploması	Murat	
1999	Çatısız Kadınlar	Ahmet	TV series
1999	Kimsecikler		TV series
1999	Figüran	Sırrı	TV film
2000	Taksim-İstanbul		TV series
2000	Üzgünüm Leyla	Taxi driver Orhan	TV series
2000	Şaşı Felek Çıkmazı	Hilmi	TV series
2000	Şarkıcı	Doctor	
2000	Acı Gönül		
2001	Deli Yürek-Boomerang Cehennemi	Bozo	
2003–2004	Kurtlar Vadisi	Aslan Akbey	TV series
2004	24 Saat	Superintendent Ahmet	TV series
2004	Çalınan Ceset	Ahmet	TV series
2005	Rüzgarlı Bahçe	Çınar	TV series
2005	Banyo	Adnan	
2006	Pars: Kiraz Operasyonu	Kadir Zebari	
2006	Kız Babası	Rıza Kılıç	TV series
2006	Kuşdili	Şükrü	TV series
2007	Sardunya Sokağı	İrfan	TV series
2007	Kuzey Rüzgârı	Aziz	TV series
2008	Devrim Arabaları	Latif	
2008	Gölgesizler	Muhtar	
2008	Alia	Chief Constable	TV film
2008	Mevlana Aşkın Dansı		
2008	Girdap	Yaşar Bey	
2008	Aşk-ı Memnu	Adnan Ziyagil	TV series
2009	Suluboya		Animated film
2011	Mazi Kalbimde Yaradır	Rauf Bey	TV series
2011	Celal Tan ve Ailesinin Aşırı Acıklı Hikayesi	Celal Tan	
2012	Uçurum	Arif	TV series
2013	Bugünün Saraylısı	Ata	TV series
2015	Güneşin Kızları	Guest appearance	TV series
2014–2017	Kim Milyoner Olmak İster?	Presenter	TV program
2017–2018	Milyonluk Resim	Presenter	TV program
2017	The Ottoman Lieutenant	Melih Pasha	
2023	Sevda Mecburi İstikamet	Selim Erensoylu	Film
2025	Leyla: Hayat... Aşk... Adalet...	Vedat Koroglu	TV series
2026	Dünyayi Degistiren Ayten		Film
2027	Danalar ve İnsanlar	Cemil	Film
