= Valley of the Wolves: Homeland =

- Theatrical release poster
- Turkish: Kurtlar Vadisi Vatan
- Directed by: Serdar Akar
- Starring: Necati Şaşmaz; Ertuğrul Şakar; Sinem Uslu; Cahit Kayaoğlu; Nezih Işıtan; Erhan Ufak
- Production company: Pana Film
- Release date: September 29, 2017
- Running time: 105 minutes
- Country: Turkey
- Language: Turkish
- Box office: 7,355,034 ₺

Valley of the Wolves: Homeland (Turkish: Kurtlar Vadisi Vatan) is a film of the Turkish TV serial media franchise Valley of the Wolves. The story is set during the Turkish coup d'état attempt.

== Synopsis ==
During an operation in northern Iraq, Polat Alemdar and his team receive a map of Turkey marked with several strategic locations, including military bases, special operations centers, and the border town of Yalavuz near Syria. While investigating the map, they uncover a coordinated plot in which a large military force is positioned near the Turkish border, poised to invade the country upon receiving a signal. At the same time, a coup attempt is being planned inside Turkey. Polat Alemdar and his team, in collaboration with loyal state institutions, work to uncover and prevent both the internal coup and the external military operation

== Cast ==
- Necati Sasmaz as Polat Alemdar
- Erhan Ufak as Erhan
- Ertugrul Sakar as Yasin
- Cahit Kayaoglu as Cahit
- Nezih Isitan as Dave
- Sinem Öztürk as Tegmen Deniz Öztürk
- Tuncay Beyazit as Muhtar
- Zumre Erturk as Teacher
- Iskender Altin as Soros
- Yücel Erten as Muhterem
- Senol Ipek as Ömer
- Özcan Özdemir as Soldier
- Esra Isgüzar as Seher Nurse

== Release ==
The film was released in cinemas on 29 September 2017 in Turkey, Germany, and the Netherlands.

== Sources ==
- "Kurtlar Vadisi Vatan 29 Eylül 2017'de sinemalarda". TeknolojiHaberim.net (in Turkish).
- "New 'Valley of the Wolves' movie handles foiled coup attempt in Turkey". hurriyetdailynews.com (in Turkish). Antalya: Hürriyet. 26 April 2017.
