= Erhan Aydın =

Turkish footballer

Personal information
- Full name: Erhan Aydın
- Date of birth: 13 February 1981 (age 45)
- Position: Forward

Youth career
- TeBe Berlin

Senior career*
Years	Team	Apps	(Gls)
2001–2003	Werder Bremen II	33	(5)
2003–2004	SC Verl		
2004–2005	MSV Neuruppin		
2005–2007	Berliner AK		
2007–2008	Ankaraspor	3	(0)
2007	→ Bugsasspor (loan)		
2008	Şekerspor		
2009	Eyüpspor		
2010–2011	Gölcükspor		
2011–2012	Gölbaşıspor		
- * Club domestic league appearances and goals

Erhan Aydın (born 13 February 1981) is a Turkish retired footballer who played as a winger.

== Career ==
Born in Berlin, Aydın began playing football for SV Werder Bremen II. He moved to Turkey and joined Turkish Super League side Ankaraspor. He only made three league appearances for Ankaraspor, and ended his career with Gölcükspor in the TFF Third League.
