= Kim 500 Bin İster? =

- Logo
- Also known as: Kim beş yüz bin ister?
- Presented by: Kenan Işık; Haluk Bilginer
- Country of origin: Turkey

Production
- Production company: STR Productions

Original release
- Network: Show TV
- Release: December 5, 2005 – June 3, 2007

Related
- Kim 500 Milyar İster?; Kim 1 Milyon İster?

Kim beş yüz bin ister? (English translation:Who wants five hundred thousand?) is a Turkish game show based on the original British format of Who Wants to Be a Millionaire?.

The show was hosted by actor Kenan Işık and later by Haluk Bilginer. The main goal of the game was to win YTL 500,000 by answering 15 multiple-choice questions correctly. There were three lifelines - fifty fifty, phone a friend and ask the audience. It was shown on Show TV.

== Money tree ==
Payout structure
| Question number | Question value |
|---|---|
| 15 | YTL 500,000 |
| 14 | YTL 125,000 |
| 13 | YTL 64,000 |
| 12 | YTL 32,000 |
| 11 | YTL 16,000 |
| 10 | YTL 10,000 |
| 9 | YTL 6,000 |
| 8 | YTL 3,000 |
| 7 | YTL 1,500 |
| 6 | YTL 750 |
| 5 | YTL 500 |
| 4 | YTL 350 |
| 3 | YTL 200 |
| 2 | YTL 100 |
| 1 | YTL 50 |
Milestone Top prize
