= Ayrılık =

- Also known as: Ayrılık: Aşkta ve Savaşta Filistin
- Genre: Drama; Action
- Written by: Sevgi Yılmaz; Zeynep Nilüfer; Özçelik Redife Zerener; Hayri Altunyurt; Eren Azak
- Directed by: Onur TAN
- Country of origin: Turkey
- Original language: Turkish
- No. of seasons: 1
- No. of episodes: 26

Production
- Producer: Çağla Production
- Production company: Çağla Production

Original release
- Network: TRT
- Release: 13 October 2009

Ayrılık: Aşkta ve Savaşta Filistin (literally Separation: Palestine at Love and War), known in English as Farewell, is a prime time Turkish television series aired on state broadcaster TRT. The series started on 13 October 2009. The concept consultant of the series is columnist Hakan Albayrak in daily Yeni Şafak who had also been on the board of MV Mavi Marmara during the 2010 Gaza flotilla raid, while its script consultant is the trade union leader Yaşar Seyman who is a columnist of the left-wing daily BirGün.

== Controversy ==
The contents of Ayrılık reportedly stirred up controversy and protests among both Israelis and Palestinians for its portrayal of the Arab-Israeli conflict.

=== Among Israelis ===
Ayrılık is described as depicting IDF soldiers killing newborn children in cold blood and snatching babies. It sparked angry protests from politicians and the media in Israel. Simon Wiesenthal Center sent a notice on the series to Prime Minister Recep Tayyip Erdoğan. Due to growing concerns, Israeli Foreign Minister Avigdor Lieberman summoned the Turkish ambassador and complained about the antisemitic content of Ayrılık. Turkish Foreign Minister Ahmet Davutoğlu concluded that the Turkish government is not liable for the series' content.

=== Among Palestinians ===
Dubai-based MBC 4 and MBC Action began airing the series in March 2010 and Dubai One had also purchased it. After the series' aired on MBC 4 and MBC Action, a female Palestinian prisoner sent an appeal to Palestinian Prisoners' Society on behalf of other female detainees, demanding that the channel stop broadcasting Ayrılık. Female prisoners were reportedly angered by the depiction of a Palestinian female prisoner being raped by Israeli soldiers under detention, saying that it was a distortion of reality. "The series is full of misconceptions," said the woman who appealed, "like when it shows how a female prisoner’s family killed her upon her release...This is humiliating to the entire Palestinian people and only serves the occupation."

== See also ==
- Israel–Turkey relations
- Zahra's Blue Eyes
- Kurtlar Vadisi
