= Gürkan Uygun =

Turkish actor (born 1974)

- Born: 27 May 1974 (age 52); İzmit, Turkey
- Occupation: Actor
- Years active: 1990–present
- Spouse: Şebnem Ceylan (m. 2008)
- Children: 3

Gürkan Uygun (born 27 May 1974) is a Turkish actor of Georgian descent.

He joined theater in his high school years. He started his career as an amateur actor in 1990. Then he received training at the Dormen Theater. In 1996, he made his debut on television and starred in the series Tatlı Kaçıklar, Böyle Mi Olacaktı, Yedi Numara, Deli Yürek and Şapkadan Babam Çıktı. He is best known for his role as Memati Baş in the Kurtlar Vadisi TV series. For about 10 years, he played the character of Memati. In 2018, he began portraying Halil Halid in Payitaht: Abdülhamid series. He portrayed the role of Hasan Sabbah in famous Turkish series Uyanış: Büyük Selçuklu

== Theatre ==
- Testosteron : Andrzej Saramonowicz - Oyun Studios - 2013
- Timon of Athens : William Shakespeare - Oyun Studios - 2006
- Out of Order : Ray Cooney - Dormen Theatre - 1998
- Funny Money : Ray Cooney - Dormen Theatre - 1996
- The Sunshine Boys : Neil Simon - Dormen Theatre - 1994

== Filmography ==
=== Film ===
- Hoşçakal Yarın : 1998
- Fasulye : 1999 - Cengiz
- Günce : 2003 - Paper Collector
- Çarpışma : 2005
- Kurtlar Vadisi Irak : 2006 - Memati Baş
- Kurtlar Vadisi Filistin : 2011 - Memati Baş
- Hititya Mangala Çarkı : 2013
- Çanakkale: Yolun Sonu : 2013 - Onbaşı Muhsin
- Tamammıyız? : 2013 - İhsan's father
- Çakallarla Dans 3: Sıfır Sıkıntı : 2014
- Unutursam Fısılda : 2014
- Bana Masal Anlatma : 2015 - Jilet, Topal
- Bizans Oyunları : 2016 - Gazi Magosa
- Hep Yek : 2016 - Cevat
- Deliormanlı : 2016 - Tahsin Kara
- Somuncu Baba: Aşkın Sırrı : 2016 - Bayezid I
- Ankara Yazı Veda Mektubu : 2016
- Pocket Hercules: Naim Suleymanoglu : 2019 - Özer Feyzioğlu

=== Television ===
- Kaygısızlar - 1994
- Tatlı Kaçıklar - 1995
- Son Kumpanya - 1997
- Bir Demet Tiyatro
- Affet Bizi Hocam - 1998
- Böyle Mi Olacaktı - 1998
- Yılan Hikayesi - 1999
- Yedi Numara - 2000
- Aşkım Aşkım - 2001
- Deli Yürek - 2002 - Cihan
- Çiçek Taksi - 2002 - Hıdır
- Şapkadan Babam Çıktı - 2003
- Kurtlar Vadisi - 2003–2005 - Memati Baş
- Kurtlar Vadisi Terör - 2007 - Memati Baş
- Kurtlar Vadisi Pusu - 2007–2012 - Memati Baş
- Halil İbrahim Sofrası- 2010 - Himself (guest appearance)
- Muhteşem Yüzyıl - 2013 - Mimar Sinan
- Hititya: Madalyonun Sırrı - 2013
- Kaçak - 2013–2015 - Serhat Hakeri
- Kehribar - 2016 - Orhan Yarımcalı
- Bu Şehir Arkandan Gelecek - 2017 - Şahin Vargı
- Mehmed: Bir Cihan Fatihi - 2018 - Delibaş
- Payitaht: Abdülhamid - 2018–2020 - Halil Halit Bey
- Ishq o'yinlari - 2020 - Iskandar
- Uyanış: Büyük Selçuklu - 2020–2021 - Hasan Sabbah
- Teşkilat - 2021–present - Efkar / Yıldırım
- Bir Gece Masali - 2024-2025 - Kürşat Kilimci
- Mehmed: Fetihler Sultanı - 2025 - Mahmud Pasha

=== Music videos ===
- Yıldız Tilbe - "Vazgeçtim"

=== Documentaries ===
- Afife Jale - 1997
