= Erhan Kuşkapan =

Turkish footballer

Personal information
- Full name: Erhan Kuşkapan
- Date of birth: June 8, 1988 (age 38)
- Place of birth: Yenimahalle, Turkey
- Height: 1.84 m (6 ft 1/2 in)
- Position: Goalkeeper

Team information
- Current team: Ankaraspor
- Number: 12

Senior career*
Years	Team	Apps	(Gls)
2006—	Ankaraspor	0	(0)
- * Club domestic league appearances and goals as of May 6, 2007

Erhan Kuşkapan (born June 8, 1988 in Yenimahalle, Turkey) is a Turkish footballer. He currently plays as a goalkeeper for Ankaraspor in the Süper Lig.
