= Erhan Kavak =

Turkish-Swiss football player (born 1987)

Personal information
- Full name: Erhan Kavak
- Date of birth: 16 December 1987 (age 38)
- Place of birth: Bern, Switzerland
- Height: 1.80 m (5 ft 11 in)
- Position: Midfielder

Team information
- Current team: AS Italiana Bern

Senior career*
Years	Team	Apps	(Gls)
2004–2005	FC Münsingen	12	(0)
2008–2009	→ FC Biel-Bienne (loan)	24	(4)
2009–2010	→ FC Thun (loan)	7	(0)
2006–2010	BSC Young Boys	19	(0)
2010–2012	Karşıyaka	29	(1)
2012–2013	Kartalspor	8	(0)
2013–2014	Bandırmaspor	30	(2)
2017–	AS Italiana Bern	?	(?)

International career
2007	Switzerland U20	1	(0)
- * Club domestic league appearances and goals

Erhan Kavak (born 16 December 1987) is a Swiss footballer who currently plays for AS Italiana Bern.

== Career ==
In January 2006 he was transferred from FC Münsingen of 1. Liga to BSC Young Boys in Bern. On 1 July 2008 he moved to FC Biel-Bienne on loan and turned back on 30 June 2009 to Bern and on 28 July 2009 FC Thun have signed the attacking midfielder on loan from BSC Young Boys until the end of the year. In summer of 2010, he signed Karşıyaka for 2 years.
