= Kim 500 Milyar İster? =

Turkish game show

- Presented by: Kenan Işık
- Country of origin: Turkey

Production
- Production company: Med Productions

Original release
- Network: Show TV
- Release: March 7, 2000 – June 18, 2002
- Network: Kanal D
- Release: September 17, 2002 – June 2004

Related
- Kim 500 Bin İster?

Kim 500 Milyar İster? (English translation: Who wants 500 thousand million?) is a Turkish game show based on the original British format of Who Wants to Be a Millionaire?. The show was hosted by actor Kenan Işık. The main goal of the game was to win TL 500 billion (500,000 YTL after 2005 redenomination) by answering 15 multiple-choice questions correctly. There were three lifelines - fifty fifty, phone a friend and ask the audience. It was shown on Show TV and Kanal D.

== Money Tree ==
Payout structure
Question number	Question value	
Question number	Regular Edition	Kids Edition
15	TL 500,000,000,000	TL 50,000,000,000
14	TL 250,000,000,000	TL 24,000,000,000
13	TL 125,000,000,000	TL 12,000,000,000
12	TL 64,000,000,000	TL 6,000,000,000
11	TL 32,000,000,000	TL 3,000,000,000
10	TL 16,000,000,000	TL 2,000,000,000
9	TL 8,000,000,000	TL 1,000,000,000
8	TL 4,000,000,000	TL 500,000,000
7	TL 2,000,000,000	TL 300,000,000
6	TL 1,000,000,000	TL 200,000,000
5	TL 500,000,000	TL 100,000,000
4	TL 300,000,000	TL 50,000,000
3	TL 200,000,000	TL 25,000,000
2	TL 100,000,000	TL 10,000,000
1	TL 50,000,000	TL 5,000,000
Milestone Top prize
