= Kenan İmirzalıoğlu =

Turkish actor and model

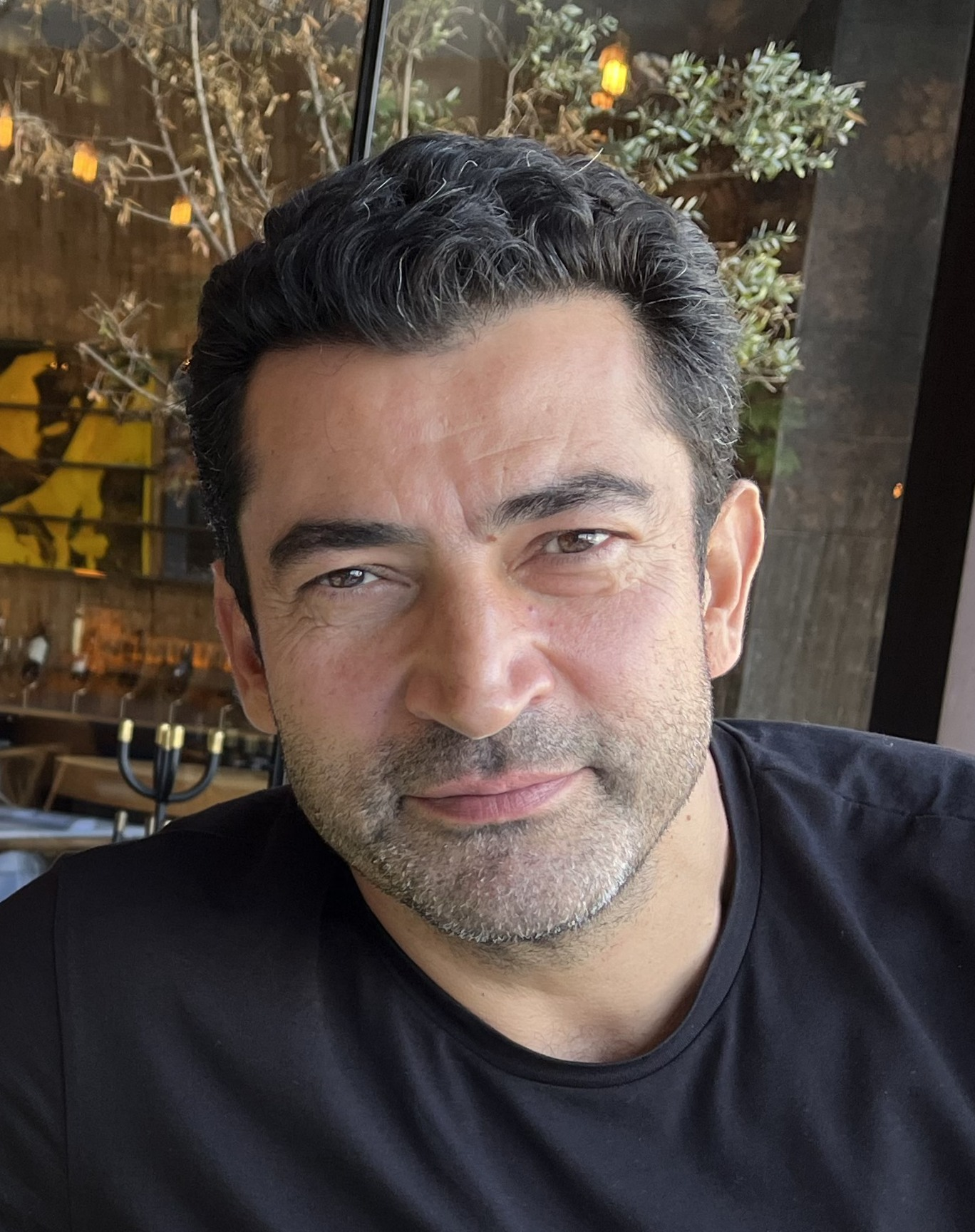
- Born: 18 June 1974 (age 52); Ankara, Turkey
- Occupations: Actor, model
- Years active: 1998–present
- Spouse: Sinem Kobal (m. 2016)
- Children: 2

Kenan İmirzalıoğlu (born 18 June 1974) is a Turkish actor and former model. İmirzalıoğlu appeared in the action films Son Osmanlı Yandım Ali (The Last Ottoman: Knockout Ali) and Kabadayı (For Love and Honor). He returned to television in 2009 with the series Ezel and also starred in the action film Ejder Kapanı (Dragon Trap) directed by Uğur Yücel.

== Early life ==
He was born on 18 June 1974 in Üçem village of Ankara's Balâ district. However, the birth certificate says 10 April 1974. His family's lineage is based on the Tabanlı tribe of the Bozulus Turkmens of the Akkoyunlu State. He comes from a family that migrated from the Khorasan region of Erzurum due to the Celali rebellions at the end of the 17th century and settled in the Balâ area, establishing the Balâ district and Üçem Village. His grandfather welcomed Mustafa Kemal Atatürk in Bala on 27 December 1919, during his first visit to Ankara, and hosted him at his home. Former Ankara MP İbrahim İmirzalıoğlu was the uncle of Kenan İmirzalıoğlu.

Kenan İmirzalıoğlu lived in Üçem village until he was 12 years old. He completed his secondary and high school education with his aunt who lived in Ankara. He studied at Yıldız Technical University for the Math department.

== Career ==
He started modeling during his university years. In 1997, he joined the Best Model of Turkey and came first. In the same year, he joined the Best Model of the World and won. Then he drew attention of Osman Sınav who is producer and screenwriter and he took his first role for Osman Sınav's TV series called Crazy Heart as leading actor. This series made him known all over the country. In 2001, İmirzalıoğlu played the same role in the movie Deli Yürek: Bumerang Cehennemi, which was a sequel to the series.

He shared the leading role with Uğur Yücel in the detective series Alacakaranlık, which was broadcast on Show TV between 2003 and 2005. Then he played Cevher, who could not overcome the traumas he experienced during military service, in the movie Toss-Up (2004), written and directed by Uğur Yücel. He won the best actor award at many prestigious festivals with this film.

He played the role of Mehmet Kosovalı in the drama series Acı Hayat, produced by again Osman Sınav, which was broadcast on Show TV between 2005 and 2007. Then he played the role of Ali in the movie The Last Ottoman (2007), which was adapted from a cartoon. He shared the leading roles with Şener Şen and Aslı Tandoğan in the movie For Love and Honor in 2007 and played the villain for the first time.

In 2009, he played the role of Akrep Celal in the movie Dragon Trap, directed by Uğur Yücel. He became very popular in Turkey with his role in the very popular TV series Ezel, which was broadcast between 2009 and 2011. In 2012, he starred in the movie Uzun Hikâye, directed by Osman Sınav.

İmirzaloğlu, whose salary agreement of $4,000,000 in 2012 for the new series they will shoot with Ay Yapım company was announced to be the highest salary for a TV series actor in Turkey, took on the leading role in the TV series Karadayı.

İmirzalioğlu played the leading role in the movie Cingöz Recai (2017) with Meryem Uzerli, which was adapted from Peyami Sefa's novel. He played Mehmed the Conqueror in the historical series Mehmed: Bir Cihan Fatihi, which was broadcast on Kanal D in 2018. The series cancelled with its 6th episode.

From 5 October 2019 to August 2024, the actor hosted the competition program called "Who Wants to Be a Millionaire?" on atv.

== Personal life ==
İmirzalıoğlu was close with Tuncel Kurtiz and loved him a lot. He was with him on many TV Shows including Ezel. However he died just a couple years after the show had finished. Kenan would spend time with him at his farms, houses, etc.

İmirzalioğlu had a love affair with Zeynep Tokuş, his co-star in the TV series Deli Yürek. The actor was in a relationship with his co-star Zeynep Beşerler for 6 years, whom he met in the TV series Alacakaranlık.

On 14 May 2016, İmirzalıoğlu married actress Sinem Kobal. The couple's first child, a daughter named Lalin, was born in October 2020. Their second daughter, named Leyla, was born in May 2022.

== Filmography ==
=== TV series ===
- Deli Yürek (Yusuf Miroğlu) (1998–2002)
- Alacakaranlık (Ferit Çağlayan) (2003–2005)
- Bitter Life (Mehmet Kosovalı) (2005–2007)
- Ezel (Ezel Bayraktar) (2009–2011)
- Karadayı (Mahir Kara) (2012–2015)
- Mehmed Bir Cihan Fatihi (Sultan Mehmed II) (2018)
- Alef (Kemal) (2020)
- A.B.İ. (Doğan) (2026)

=== Films ===
- Deli Yürek: Bumerang Cehennemi (Yusuf Miroğlu) (2001)
- Yazı Tura (Hayalet Cevher) (2004)
- Son Osmanlı Yandım Ali (Yandım Ali) (2006)
- Kabadayı (Devran) (2007)
- Ejder Kapanı (Akrep Celal) (2009)
- Uzun Hikâye (Ali) (2012)
- Cingöz Recai (Recai) (2017)

=== TV programs ===
- Kim Milyoner Olmak İster? (2019–2024)

== Awards ==
=== Cinema ===
| Year | Ceremony | Awards | Notes |
|---|---|---|---|
| 2005 | Golden Boll Awards | The Best Actor | won for Yazı Tura |
| 2005 | Adana Altin Koza Film Festival | The Best Actor | won for Yazı Tura |
| 2005 | Ankara International Film Festival | The Best Actor | won for Yazı Tura |
| 2007 | LAU – (Lefke Avrupa University) Awards | The Best Actor | won for The Last Ottoman |
| 2007 | 1st Yesilçam Awards | The Best Actor | won for For Love and Honor (Kabadayi) |
| 2010 | Sadri Alışık Cinema Awards, Special Jury Award | The Best Actor | won for Dragon Trap (Ejder Kapani) |
| 2013 | Yıldız Technical University | The most admired actor | won for Uzun Hikâye |

==== Television ====
| Year | Ceremony | Awards | Notes |
|---|---|---|---|
| 2010 | Galtasaray universitesi | Best Actor | won for Ezel |
| 2010 | İsmail Cem Television Awards | Best Actor | won for Ezel |
| 2011 | Medya Oscars | Best Actor | won for Ezel |
| 2011 | Golden Butterfly Awards | Best Actor | won for Ezel |
| 2012 | RTGD – Media Oscar Awards | Best Actor of the year | won for Karadayı |
| 2012 | Association of Local and Regional Televisions | The most successful actor | won for Karadayı |
| 2013 | Antalya Television Awards | Best Actor (Drama Series) | won for Karadayı |
| 2013 | Golden Butterfly Awards | The Best Actor | won for Karadayı |
| 2013 | Magazine Casusu | The Best Actor | won for Karadayı |
| 2013 | 4th Ayakli Gazete TV Star Awards | The Best Actor | won for Karadayı |
| 2013 | 4th Quality Awards | The Best Actor | won for Karadayı |
| 2013 | Golden Lion Awards | The Best Actor | won for Karadayı |
| 2013 | Bilkent Television Awards | The Best Actor | won for Karadayı |
| 2013 | GQ – Actor of the year | Actor of the Year | won for Karadayı |
| 2014 | 5th Ayakli Gazete TV Star Awards | Best actor (period Drama) | won for Karadayı |
| 2014 | Engelsiz Yasam Foundation Awards | Best Actor | won for Karadayı |
| 2014 | Yıldız Technical University Awards | Best Actor | won for Karadayı |
| 2015 | Mersin Golden Palm Awards | Best Actor | won for Karadayı |
| 2015 | 11th Istanbul Aydın University Awards | Best Actor | won for Karadayı |
| 2015 | Golden Objektif Awards | Best Actor | won for Karadayı |
