= Osman Sınav =

Turkish director and producer (1956–2025)

- Born: August 1956; Burdur, Turkey
- Died: 20 March 2025 (aged 68); Istanbul, Turkey
- Burial place: Karacaahmet Cemetery
- Occupation(s): Director, producer, screenwriter
- Spouse: Tangül Sınav (m. 1985; div. 2016)
- Children: 3

Osman Sınav (August 1956 – 20 March 2025) was a Turkish director, producer and screenwriter.

== Life and career ==
Sınav studied art and also finished courses in textile design, cinema, and television at the Istanbul State Fine Arts Academy. He worked as a copywriter from 1979–1980 and from 1980–1984 at the Grafika Lintas Advertising agency. In 1984, he founded his production company, Sinegraf. In 2012, he received a special degree in cinema and television from Mimar Sinan Fine Arts University.

== Death ==
Sınav died in Istanbul at the age of 68 on 20 March 2025, following a long struggle with cancer. Two days later, he was buried at Karacaahmet Cemetery in Istanbul.

== Filmography ==
=== As director ===
- Gel Dese Aşk (2020)
- Sen Anlat Karadeniz (2018)
- İnadına Aşk (2015–2016)
- Kızılelma (2014)
- Aşk Kırmızı (2013)
- Uzun Hikâye (2012)
- Kılıç Günü (2010)
- Masumlar (2009)
- Sakarya Fırat (2009)
- Doludizgin Yıllar (2008)
- Pars Narkoterör (2007)
- Pars: Kiraz Operasyonu (2006)
- Kurtlar Vadisi (2003)
- Ekmek Teknesi (2002)
- Deli Yürek: Bumerang Cehennemi (2001)
- Melek Hanım (2000)
- Hayat Bağları (1999)
- Deli Yürek (1999)
- Mavi Düşler (1998)
- Sıcak Saatler (1998)
- Yasemince (1997)
- Kralın Hayatı (1996)
- Melek Apartmanı (1995)
- Bizim Yunus (1995)
- Gerilla (1994)
- Yalancı (1993)
- Süper Baba (1993)
- Kapıları Açmak (1992)
- Hayata Gülümsemek (1992)
- Yarına Gülümsemek (1991)
- Aşka Kimse Yok (1990)
- Yalancı Şafak (1990)
- Küçük Dünya (1990)
- Hünkarın Bir Günü (1989)
- Atlı Karınca (1989)
- Bir Muharririn Ölümü (1987)

=== As writer ===
- Masumlar (2009)
- Pars: Kiraz Operasyonu (2006)
- Deli Yürek: Bumerang Cehennemi (2001)
- Kapıları Açmak (1992)
- Aşka Kimse Yok (1990)
- Hünkarın Bir Günü (1989)
- Bir Muharririn Ölümü (1987)

=== As producer ===
- Kör Nokta (2024)
- Sen Anlat Karadeniz (2018)
- N'olur Ayrılalım (2016)
- Şahane Damat (2016)
- İnadına Aşk (2015–2016)
- Hatasız Kul Olmaz (2014)
- Kızılelma (2014)
- Aramızdakı Duvar (2011)
- Kılıç Günü (2010)
- Doludizgin Yıllar (2008)
- Alayına İsyan (2009)
- Sakarya Fırat (2009)
- Zoraki Başkan (2009)
- Masumlar (2009)
- Pars Narkoterör (2007)
- Pusat (2007)
- Pars: Kiraz Operasyonu (2006)
- Bitter Life (2005)
- Kapıları Açmak (2005)
- Kurtlar Vadisi (2003)
- Ekmek Teknesi (2002)
- Deli Yürek: Bumerang Cehennemi (2001)
- Hayat Bağları (1999)
- Melek Apartmanı (1995)
