= Oktay Kaynarca =

Turkish actor and television host

- Kaynarca in 2019
- Born: January 27, 1965 (age 61); Üsküdar, Istanbul, Turkey
- Education: Istanbul University State Conservatory
- Occupations: Actor, producer, screenwriter, TV host
- Years active: 1989–present

Oktay Kaynarca (born 27 January 1965) is a Turkish actor, producer, screenwriter, and television personality. He graduated from the Theatre Department of the Istanbul University State Conservatory.

Kaynarca is best known for his leading roles in highly popular Turkish television drama series. He gained massive national fame by portraying the iconic character Süleyman Çakır in the cult crime series Kurtlar Vadisi (Valley of the Wolves) between 2003 and 2004. He later achieved another major career milestone by playing the lead character, Hızır Çakırbeyli, in the long-running hit mafia-drama series Eşkıya Dünyaya Hükümdar Olmaz (The Bandits Cannot Rule the World) from 2015 to 2021.

== Filmography ==
=== Television ===
- Gençler (1989)
- Yeditepe İstanbul (2001–2002)
- Kurtlar Vadisi (2003–2004)
- Adanalı (2008–2010)
- Ustura Kemal (2012)
- Eşkıya Dünyaya Hükümdar Olmaz (2015–2021)
- Ben Bu Cihana Sığmazam (2022–2024)
