= Gökhan Kırdar =

Turkish musician and composer (born 1970)

- Born: 2 June 1970 (age 55); Aydın, Turkey
- Genres: Turkish pop music, trip hop, ethnic electronica, film score
- Occupations: Musician, composer
- Years active: 1991–present
- Label: Loopus Entertainment

Gökhan Kırdar (born 2 June 1970) is a Turkish musician and film score composer.

He attended Yıldız University in Istanbul to study architecture in 1988. However, he devoted himself to music and soon gained success with his soundtrack, released in 1993. Then he released two highly successful albums titled "Serseri Mayın" and "Tutunamadım". During this period, his single "Yerine Sevemem" became a hit and even shadowed the name of its creator. He, then, decided to go to İzmir where he studied musicology at Dokuz Eylül University.

He established his own music company "Loopus Entertainment" in 1997, and released the first Turkish trip hop album and also third Turkish electronic music album ( belongs to the first and second albums, Erol Temizel ) Trip under this label. This was a risky move but proved to be efficient, at least for creating a new view for the Turkish audience.

Kırdar composed film scores for movies and TV series which received various awards and became very popular. Meanwhile, he contributes to a Turkish project titled "Self Project" with his work "Tüür" on the synthesis of Turkish musical instruments since 2000 BCE with electronic music.

== Life and career ==
Gökhan Kırdar was born in Aydın, Turkey on 2 June 1970. He is of Iraqi Turkmen origin. After primary school he lived in İzmir and after being accepted in Yıldız University Architecture Faculty, he moved to Istanbul for good. He released his first album "Floating Mine" in 1994. The album immediately had a great success especially because of the hit single 'Don't Love Anyone'. In 1995 the second album "I Couldn't Hold On" was released including his first film music project single from 1993, 'Night Angel and Our Chaps'. Kırdar started his study in 9 Eylül University, Fine Arts Faculty of Musicology in 1997 and in the same year he established his own label and music company Loopus. His 1997 release "Trip" was accepted as the first electronic/triphop album for Turkish modern music.

After the 1999 İzmit earthquake, he contributed in charity projects for victim children with "Furby 3 Doo" which is released in collaboration with Hasbro Intertoy. This project, designed as a talking robot created in real time with an album, was very interesting for the public attention. The soundtrack for the movie "Namaste", the winner of 1999 Ankara Film Festival as the best short movie was one of the other projects of him in the same time period. In 2000, Gokhan Kirdar released his first library project "Ethnotronix". The project was introduced to 14 different countries by Müzikotek and in 2003 it was released as an album too.

The documentary called "Tekfur Palace and Istanbul" which he made soundtrack for won 2002's Audience Special Award in Istanbul Documentaries Festival. The same year he designed another documentary soundtrack this time for "Aliya". The work won the Documentary of the Year Award in Documentary Authors Union. Gökhan Kırdar composed the music for the movie "Crude" in 2002. The movie won a lot of prizes including The Best Movie Award in Los Angeles Film Festival. In 2004, he brought together all the music from the movie in an album called "Pleasure" and it was released in Greece, Poland and Lebanon. The song 'Pleasure' from the album was also released in a compilation all around the world by EMI.

Gökhan Kırdar has been designing the music for the Turkish TV series "Valley of The Wolves" since 2002 and he released the soundtrack albums in 2004 as "Valley of The Wolves Vol.1" and "Valley of The Wolves Vol.2". in the same year he signed a contract with English Warner-Chappel company for a new library work project. As being in the spotlight because of his TV soundtrack projects since 2002, he released the music he designed for the series called "June Night" in his January 2005 release "The Rain".

In November 2004, he completed the work for the movie "Tell Me Istanbul" which was due to release in March 2005. The album "Don't Strike Me Over" which also included the music designed for "Foreign Groom" was released on 2 June 2005, in some other European countries as well as in Greece, Malta, Cyprus and Turkey.

In 2004, he was a contributor with his music project titled "Tuur" in 'Self Project' held in Luxemburg which also hosted some other Turkish designers. The same project was released 18 July 2005 as an MC/CD/DVD and video film in Turkey and all around Europe. "Tuur" is entitled as a unique piece with a history coming from 15.000 B.C. and based on ancient Asian Turkish music instruments mixed together with electronic and industrial music In the second half of the same year, he prepared the soundtrack of the movie, "The Bath".

In December 2005, he released the album, "Don't Love Anyone/Best of Generic Vol.1". This album entitled as the first multi-formatted album ever made for having a very rich visual content.

In October 2005, Kırdar started to work on his soundtrack project for the movie "Valley of the Wolves Iraq", released in Turkey first, then in Europe and the Middle East in February 2006. Receiving good reviews both with its content and music, the film, will be shown at theatres soon in USA, Latin America and Russia. In the album, "Golden Nosering", a traditional Kirkuk song is very special for being Kırdar's first folk song performance throughout his musical career.

Lately, Gökhan Kırdar's music has contributed in a Discovery Channel /America documentary project "Not Your Average Travel Guide/Turkey", directed by American director Shane Reynolds. Besides he started to create music for new Turkish TV series like "The Bridge" and "Present Tenses" and "Dede Korkut's Stories".

== Works ==
=== Albums ===
- Floating Mine (1994)
- I Couldn't Hold On (1995)
- Trip (1997)

=== Serial albums ===
- Ethnotronix (2000)
- Tuur_Prayer for Rain (2005)

=== Soundtracks ===
- Pleasure (2002)
- Valley of the Wolves Vol.1 (2004)
- Valley of the Wolves Vol.2 (2004)
- The Rain (2005)
- Don't Strike Me Over (2005)
- Don't Love Anyone/Best of Generic Vol.1 (2006)
- Valley of the Wolves Iraq (2006)
- Valley of the Wolves Vol.3 (2009)
- Uyanış: Büyük Selçuklu (2020)

=== Documentary works ===
- Aliya (2002)
- Tekfur Palace and Istanbul (2002)
- Not Your Average Travel Guide (2007)

=== Library works ===
- Ethnotronix (2000)
- From İstanbul (2003)

=== Contribute albums ===
- My Longing (1994 İzel's album)
- I'm Ready (1995 Candan Erçetin's album)
- Asya (1996 Asya's album)
- Silver (1996 Nükhet Duru's album)
- A Small Story (1999 İzel's album)
- Innocent (1999 Asya's album)
- Breathe (2000 Ayşegül Aldinç's album)
- CNN Turk Musics (2003)

== See also ==
- Turkish Music
