= Show TV =

Turkey's national broadcaster

- Country: Turkey
- Broadcast area: National (terrestrial); Worldwide (available online)
- Affiliates: Alem FM
- Headquarters: Levent, Beşiktaş, Istanbul

Programming
- Language: Turkish
- Picture format: 576i (16:9 SDTV); 1080i (HDTV)

Ownership
- Owner: Çukurova Holding (1999–2013); TMSF (2013–2015); Ciner Yayın Holding (2015– Dec. 2024); Can Holding (Dec. 2024–Sept. 2025); TMSF (Sept. 2025–Present)
- Sister channels: Show Türk ^{HD} Habertürk TV ^{HD} Bloomberg HT ^{HD} HT Spor ^{HD} Kanal 1^{HD}

History
- Launched: 1 March 1991 (France); 1 March 1992 (Turkey)

Links
- Website: www.showtv.com.tr

Show TV is a Turkish free-to-air national television channel, established in 1991 by Erol Aksoy, Dinç Bilgin, Haldun Simavi and Erol Simavi, owned by the TMSF.

Show TV's previous logo used from 1 March 1991 to 30 September 2002.

== History ==
The channel replaces Cine5, and it was originally established by the Turkish businessmen Erol Aksoy and Haldun Simavi, and originally launched on March 1, 1991, when it commenced its test transmissions. A year later, the channel moved its headquarters to Istanbul, Turkey, and were at the same time starting its official broadcasts. Show TV extended its range of viewers by adding more channels like Show Max and Show Turk to its group.

On 6 June 2013 the channel was reacquired by Ciner Media Group.

The channel's personalities include Ece Erken, Defne Samyeli, Gülben Ergen, Bülent Ersoy, Ferhat Göçer, Ece Üner, Reha Muhtar, Serdar Ortaç, Demet Akbağ, Mehmet Ali Erbil, Volkan Konak, Alişan, Hülya Avşar, Acun Ilıcalı, Seda Sayan and Çağla Şıkel. The channel also aired successful Turkish television series like Kurtlar Vadisi, Doktorlar, Adını Feriha Koydum, and Muhteşem Yüzyıl.

On 11 September 2025, the channel was seized by the state and placed under the control of the Savings Deposit Insurance Fund of Turkey as part of an investigation into fraud, tax evasion and money laundering into Can Holding.

== Turkish television series ==
- Acı Hayat (2005–2007)
- Adını Feriha Koydum (2011–2012)
- Alev Alev (Flames of Fate) (2020–2021)
- Asla Vazgeçmem (2015–2016)
- Aşk Laftan Anlamaz (2016–2017)
- Aşk Ağlatır (2019)
- Bahar (2023–2025)
- Cennet Mahallesi (2004–2007)
- Kış Güneşi (2016)
- Çukur (2017–2021)
- Çarpışma (2018–2019)
- Dadı (2000–2002)
- Deha (2024–2025)
- Deli Yürek (1999–2001)
- Doktorlar (2006–2011)
- Ezel (2009)
- Ezra (2014)
- Gülperi (2018–2019)
- İçerde (2016–2017)
- İçimizden Biri (2021–present)
- Kurtlar Vadisi (2003–2005)
- Kurtlar Vadisi Pusu (2007–2009)
- Kuzey Yıldızı İlk Aşk (2019–2021)
- Kırmızı Kamyon (2021–present)
- Lale Devri
- Muhteşem Yüzyıl (2011)
- Ramo (2020–2021)
- Arıza (2020–2021)
- Sahte Prenses (2006)
- Servet (2018)
- Tatlı Hayat (2001–2003)
- Üç Kuruş (2021–2022)
- Zemheri (2020)
- Sarhoş Gibiyim (2022)

== Entertainment shows ==
- Var mısın? Yok musun? (the Turkish version of Deal or No Deal; 2007–2010, 2013–2014)
- Kim 500 Milyar İster? (the first Turkish version of Who Wants to Be a Millionaire?; 2000–2002)
- En Zayıf Halka (the first Turkish version of The Weakest Link; 2001–2002)
- Kim 500 Bin İster? (the second Turkish version of Who Wants to Be a Millionaire?; 2005–2007)
- Pazar Sürprizi
- Bu Tarz Benim (2014–2015)
- Şahane Show
- Yemekteyiz (the Turkish version of Come Dine with Me; 2008–2011)
- Wipeout (Based on the 2008 game show Wipeout)
- Bir Milyon Canlı Para (the Turkish version of The Million Pound Drop; 2010–2011)
- MasterChef (the Turkish version of MasterChef; 2011)
- Survivor (the Turkish version of Survivor; 2006–2012)
- Huysuz'la Dans Eder misin? (the Turkish version of So You Think You Can Dance; 2011)
- Yetenek Sizsiniz (the Turkish version of Got Talent; 2009–2012)
- O Ses Türkiye (the Turkish version of The Voice; 2011)
- Bugün Ne Giysem?
