= 2nd Yeşilçam Awards =

- Date: March 3, 2009
- Location: Lütfi Kırdar Congress & Exhibition Hall
- Country: Turkey
- Presented by: Turkish Foundation of Cinema and Audiovisual Culture (TÜRSAK); Beyoğlu Municipality
- Website: http://www.yesilcamodulleri.com.tr/

Television/radio coverage
- Network: NTV Turkey

The 2nd Yeşilçam Awards (Turkish: 2. Yeşilçam Ödülleri), presented by the Turkish Foundation of Cinema and Audiovisual Culture (TÜRSAK) and Beyoğlu Municipality, honored the best Turkish films of 2008 and took place on March 3, 2009, at the Lütfi Kırdar Congress and Exhibition Hall in Istanbul, Turkey.

== Awards and nominations ==
=== Best Film ===
- Winner: Three Monkeys (Turkish: Üç Maymun) directed by Nuri Bilge Ceylan
  - Autumn (Turkish: Sonbahar) directed by Özcan Alper
  - Alone (Turkish: Issız Adam) directed by Çağan Irmak
  - Cars of the Revolution (Turkish: Devrim Arabaları) directed by Tolga Örnek
  - A.R.O.G directed by Cem Yılmaz

=== Best Director ===
- Winner: Nuri Bilge Ceylan for Three Monkeys (Turkish: Üç Maymun)
  - Özcan Alper for Autumn (Turkish: Sonbahar)
  - Çağan Irmak for Alone (Turkish: Issız Adam)
  - Tolga Örnek for Cars of the Revolution (Turkish: Devrim Arabaları)
  - Cem Yılmaz for A.R.O.G

=== Best Actor ===
- Winner: Onur Saylak for Autumn (Turkish: Sonbahar)
  - Yavuz Bingöl for Three Monkeys (Turkish: Üç Maymun)
  - Cem Yılmaz for A.R.O.G
  - Çetin Tekindor for The Messenger (Turkish: Ulak)
  - Taner Birsel for Cars of the Revolution (Turkish: Devrim Arabaları)

=== Best Actress ===
- Winner: Hatice Aslan for Three Monkeys (Turkish: Üç Maymun)
  - Nurgül Yeşilçay for Conscience (Turkish: Vicdan)
  - Demet Akbağ for O... Çocukları
  - Ayça Damgacı for My Marlon and Brando (Turkish: Gitmek)
  - Melis Birkan for Alone (Turkish: Issız Adam)

=== Best Supporting Actor Award ===
- Winner: Altan Erkekli for O... Çocukları
  - Zafer Algöz for A.R.O.G
  - Ercan Kesal for Three Monkeys (Turkish: Üç Maymun)
  - Serkan Keskin for Autumn (Turkish: Sonbahar)
  - Volga Sorgu for My Marlon and Brando (Turkish: Gitmek)
  - Selçuk Yöntem for Cars of the Revolution (Turkish: Devrim Arabaları)

=== Best Supporting Actress Award ===
- Winner: Yıldız Kültür for Alone (Turkish: Issız Adam)
  - Megi Kobaladze for Autumn (Turkish: Sonbahar)
  - Özgü Namal for O... Çocukları
  - Şerif Sezer for The Messenger (Turkish: Ulak)
  - Sele Uçer for Ara

=== Best Cinematography Award ===
- Winner: Gökhan Tiryaki for Three Monkeys (Turkish: Üç Maymun)
  - Feza Çaldıran for Autumn (Turkish: Sonbahar)
  - Soykut Turan for A.R.O.G
  - Hasan Gergin for Cars of the Revolution (Turkish: Devrim Arabaları)
  - Mirsad Heroviç for The Messenger (Turkish: Ulak)

=== Best Screenplay Award ===
- Winner: Ebru Ceylan, Nuri Bilge Ceylan & Ercan Kesal for Three Monkeys (Turkish: Üç Maymun)
  - Özcan Alper for Autumn (Turkish: Sonbahar)
  - Çağan Irmak for Alone (Turkish: Issız Adam)
  - Tolga Örnek & Murat Dişli for Cars of the Revolution (Turkish: Devrim Arabaları)
  - Sırrı Süreyya Önder for O... Çocukları

=== Best Music Award ===
- Winner: Aria Müzik for Alone (Turkish: Issız Adam)
  - Demir Demirkan for Cars of the Revolution (Turkish: Devrim Arabaları)
  - Mazlum Çimen for The Last Executioner (Turkish: Son Cellat)
  - Evanthia Reboutsika for The Messenger (Turkish: Ulak)
  - Zülfü Livaneli for Conscience (Turkish: Vicdan)
  - Cahit Berkay for After the Rain (Turkish: Yağmurdan Sonra)

=== Digiturk Young Talent Award ===
- Winner: Ahmet Rıfat Şungar for Three Monkeys (Turkish: Üç Maymun)
  - Ozan Bilen for Girdap
  - Emrah Özdemir for My Marlon and Brando (Turkish: Gitmek)
  - Onur Ünsal for Cars of the Revolution (Turkish: Devrim Arabaları)
  - Atakan Yağız for The Messenger (Turkish: Ulak)

=== Turkcell First Film Award ===
- Winner: Autumn (Turkish: Sonbahar) directed by Özcan Alper
  - Bayrampaşa: Ben Fazla Kalmayacağım directed by Hamdi Alkan
  - 120 directed by Özhan Eren & Murat Saraçoğlu
  - My Marlon and Brando (Turkish: Gitmek) directed by Hüseyin Karabey
  - Cars of the Revolution (Turkish: Devrim Arabaları) directed by Tolga Örnek

== See also ==
- Yeşilçam Award
- Turkish films of 2008
- 2008 in film
