= Yeşilçam Award =

National film award of Turkey

- Awarded for: Best in film
- Country: Turkey
- Presented by: Turkish Foundation of Cinema and Audiovisual Culture
- First award: 2008
- Website: http://www.yesilcamodulleri.com.tr/

The Yeşilçam Award was the national film award of Turkey, which was presented annually by the Turkish Foundation of Cinema and Audiovisual Culture (TÜRSAK) and Beyoğlu Municipality from 2008 to 2011. The award, which had been named after Yeşilçam Street in the Beyoğlu district of Istanbul where many film studios were based during the 1950s-1970s, was discontinued following the announcement by the Alliance of Cinema Labor Unions' Yeşilçam Film Academy (YEFA) intention to start issuing their own Yeşilçam Academy Award in protest against TÜRSAK's disregard of their suggestions to give the awards a more professional structure.

== Awards ==
Editions
1st Yeşilçam Awards (March 24, 2008)
2nd Yeşilçam Awards (March 3, 2009)
3rd Yeşilçam Awards (March 23, 2010)
4th Yeşilçam Awards (March 28, 2011)

=== Best Film Award ===
- 2008: Bliss (Turkish: Mutluluk) directed by Abdullah Oğuz
- 2009: Three Monkeys (Turkish: Üç Maymun) directed by Nuri Bilge Ceylan
- 2010: Breath (Turkish: Nefes: Vatan Sağolsun) directed by Levent Semerci
- 2011: Majority (Turkish: Çoğunluk) directed by Seren Yüce

=== Best Director Award ===
- 2008: Fatih Akın for The Edge of Heaven (Turkish: Yaşamın Kıyısında)
- 2009: Nuri Bilge Ceylan for Three Monkeys (Turkish: Üç Maymun)
- 2010: Reha Erdem for My Only Sunshine (Turkish: Hayat Var)
- 2011: Seren Yüce for Majority (Turkish: Çoğunluk)

=== Best Actor Award ===
- 2008: Şener Şen for For Love and Honor (Turkish: Kabadayı)
- 2009: Onur Saylak for Autumn (Turkish: Sonbahar)
- 2010: Mert Fırat for Love in Another Language (Turkish: Başka Dilde Aşk)
- 2011: Cem Yılmaz for Hunting Season (Turkish: Av Mevsimi)

=== Best Actress Award ===
- 2008: Özgü Namal for Bliss (Turkish: Mutluluk)
- 2009: Hatice Aslan for Three Monkeys (Turkish: Üç Maymun)
- 2010: Binnur Kaya for Vavien
- 2011: Demet Akbağ for Eyyvah Eyvah

=== Best Supporting Actor Award ===
- 2008: Tuncel Kurtiz for The Edge of Heaven (Turkish: Yaşamın Kıyısında)
- 2009: Altan Erkekli for O... Çocukları
- 2010: Cemal Toktaş for I Saw the Sun (Turkish: Güneşi Gördüm)
- 2011: Okan Yalabık for Hunting Season (Turkish: Av Mevsimi)

=== Best Supporting Actress Award ===
- 2008: Nursel Köse for The Edge of Heaven (Turkish: Yaşamın Kıyısında)
- 2009: Yıldız Kültür for Alone (Turkish: Issız Adam)
- 2010: Derya Alabora for Pandora's Box (Turkish: Pandora’nın Kutusu)
- 2011: Melisa Sözen for Hunting Season (Turkish: Av Mevsimi)

=== Best Cinematography Award ===
- 2008: Mirsad Heroviç for Bliss (Turkish: Mutluluk)
- 2009: Gökhan Tiryaki for Three Monkeys (Turkish: Üç Maymun)
- 2010: Soykut Turan for I Saw the Sun (Turkish: Güneşi Gördüm)
- 2011: Uğur İçbak for Hunting Season (Turkish: Av Mevsimi)

=== Best Screenplay Award ===
- 2008: Fatih Akın for The Edge of Heaven (Turkish: Yaşamın Kıyısında)
- 2009: Ebru Ceylan, Nuri Bilge Ceylan & Ercan Kesal for Three Monkeys (Turkish: Üç Maymun)
- 2010: Engin Günaydın for Vavien
- 2011: Seren Yüce for Majority (Turkish: Çoğunluk)

=== Best Music Award ===
- 2008: Zülfü Livaneli for Bliss (Turkish: Mutluluk)
- 2009: Aria Müzik for Alone (Turkish: Issız Adam)
- 2010: Attila Özdemiroğlu for Vavien
- 2011: Selim Demirdelen for The Crossing (Turkish: Kavşak)

=== Digiturk Young Talent Award ===
- 2008: Saadet Işıl Aksoy for Egg (Turkish: Yumurta)
- 2009: Ahmet Rıfat Şungar for Three Monkeys (Turkish: Üç Maymun)
- 2010: Elit İşcan for My Only Sunshine (Turkish: Hayat Var)
- 2011: Esme Madra for Majority (Turkish: Çoğunluk)

=== Turkcell First Film Award ===
- 2008: The White Angel (Turkish: Beyaz Melek) directed by Mahsun Kırmızıgül
- 2009: Autumn (Turkish: Sonbahar) directed by Özcan Alper
- 2010: Breath (Turkish: Nefes: Vatan Sağolsun) directed by Levent Semerci
- 2011: Majority (Turkish: Çoğunluk) directed by Seren Yüce

=== Special Achievement Award ===
- 2010: Filiz Akın

== See also ==
- Yeşilçam Academy Award
