= 18th International Adana Golden Boll Film Festival =

- Location: Adana, Turkey
- Awards: Golden Boll
- No. of films: 200+
- Festival date: September 17–25, 2011
- Website: http://www.altinkozafestivali.org.tr/en/

Adana Film Festival
- 17th

The 18th International Adana Golden Boll Film Festival (Turkish: 18. Uluslararası Adana Altın Koza Film Festivali) was a film festival held in Adana, Turkey from September 17 to 25, 2011. Cash prizes totalling 936,000 Turkish Liras, the highest amount given by a film festival in Turkey, were awarded for all categories, for the first time in Turkey, in three competitive sections, nearly 220 films were shown both in and out of competition in a selection described by critic Ali Koca as "one of the event’s strongest in recent years," following disappointment with the previous year's hastily rescheduled event, and there were also a range of lectures, workshops and other events, including the 1st International Golden Boll Film Congress, said to be the first to be organised during a film festival.

This edition of the International Adana Golden Boll Film Festival, which was founded in 1969 and is organised by the Adana Metropolitan City Municipality and accredited by FIPRESCI, was the first to accept digital submissions from filmmakers for its national feature competition. It began with an opening gala at the Merkez Park open-air theater on September 17 at which speeches were made by Adana Metropolitan City Municipality Deputy Head Zihni Aldırmaz and Development Minister Cevdet Yılmaz, Lifetime Achievement Awards were presented to Turkish actors Kadir İnanır and Nebahat Çehre, and Turkish filmmaker Ali Özgentürk, and a concert was given by the trio of Mazhar-Fuat-Özkan. Turkish actors and actresses Nuri Alço, Yavuz Karakaş, Yılmaz Köksal and Yusuf Sezgin were among those who toured the city in old style roadsters as part of the annual "Love Cortege" while the annual Solidarity Night for Cinema took place at Mimar Sinan Amphitheatre. The festival closed with an awards ceremony hosted by academic Özlem Gürses and actor Murat Başoğlu at the Adana Merkez Park Amphitheater.

The festival also played host to the 1st International Golden Boll Film Congress, coordinated by Dokuz Eylül University Faculty of Fine Arts Film Design Department and headed by Honorary Presidents Ö. Lütfi Akad, at the Adana Seyhan Hotel from September 21 to 24 on the theme of Turkish Cinema: Views from Turkey and the World, and the Adana Cinema Museum, also run by the Adana Metropolitan City Municipality, was officially opened in a restored historic mansion on Şeyhan Street.

== Awards ==
=== Awards ===
The festival's Best Actor award was dedicated in honour of Adana-born actor Cem Erman who died shortly before the start of the festival.

- Best Film: The Extremely Tragic Story of Celal Tan and His Family (Turkish: Celal Tan ve Ailesinin Aşırı Acıklı Hikayesi) directed by Onur Ünlü
- Best Director: Cemil Ağacıkoğlu for September (Turkish: Eylül)
- Best Screenplay: Onur Ünlü for The Extremely Tragic Story of Celal Tan and His Family (Turkish: Celal Tan ve Ailesinin Aşırı Acıklı Hikayesi)
- Best Actor: Durukan Ordu for Future Lasts Forever (Turkish: Gelecek Uzun Sürer)
- Best Supporting Actor: Tuna Orhan for A Serious Matter (Turkish: Memleket Meselesi)
- Best Actress: Hatice Aslan for The Body (Turkish: Vücut) and Görkem Yeltan for September (Turkish: Eylül)
- Best Supporting Actress: Şeyla Halis for The Body (Turkish: Vücut)
- Most Promising Newcomer (male): Hakan Kurtaş for The Body (Turkish: Vücut) and Gün Koper for Love and Revolution (Turkish: Aşk ve Devrim)
- Most Promising Newcomer (female): Deniz Denker for Love and Revolution (Turkish: Aşk ve Devrim)
- Best Editing: Taner Sarf for September (Turkish: Eylül)
- Best Art Director: Adalı Aksoy for Love and Revolution (Turkish: Aşk ve Devrim) and Hidden Lives (Turkish: Saklı Hayatlar)
- Jury Award for Best Ensemble Cast Performance: The Extremely Tragic Story of Celal Tan and His Family (Turkish: Celal Tan ve Ailesinin Aşırı Acıklı Hikayesi)
- Best Music: Mustafa Biber for Future Lasts Forever (Turkish: Gelecek Uzun Sürer)
- Best Cinematography: Feza Çaldıran for Future Lasts Forever (Turkish: Gelecek Uzun Sürer)
- Best Sound Effects: Burak Topalakçı for Losers' Club (Turkish: Kaybedenler Kulübü) and September (Turkish: Eylül)
- Special Jury Award: Love and Revolution (Turkish: Aşk ve Devrim) directed by F. Serkan Acar
- Adana Audience Award: Simurg directed by Ruhi Karadağ
- Yılmaz Güney Award: Future Lasts Forever (Turkish: Gelecek Uzun Sürer) directed by Özcan Alper
- Turkish Film Critics Association (SİYAD) Best Film Award: Future Lasts Forever (Turkish: Gelecek Uzun Sürer) directed by Özcan Alper

=== Honorary Awards ===
Three Lifetime Achievement Awards were presented at the opening ceremony.

- Lifetime Achievement Award: Kadir İnanır (Turkish actor)
- Lifetime Achievement Award: Nebahat Çehre (Turkish actor)
- Lifetime Achievement Award: Ali Özgentürk (Turkish producer, director & screenwriter)

The festival also curated retrospectives of the recipients films and commissioned books from film critic Burçak Evren about their respective careers.

== Competition Sections ==
=== National Feature Film Competition ===
Fourteen Turkish films made in the preceding year were selected by the Pre-Evaluation Board to compete in the festival's National Feature Film Competition.

==== National Feature Film Competition Jury ====
- Jury Head: Derviş Zaim (Turkish Cypriot director)
- Beste Bereket (Turkish actress)
- Bülent Vardar (Turkish author & academician)
- Ebru Ceylan (Turkish screenwriter & actress)
- Selim Demirdelen (Turkish director & screenwriter)
- Taner Birsel (Turkish actor)
- Yekta Kopan (Turkish author)

==== National Feature Film Competition Selection ====
- A Serious Matter (Turkish: Memleket Meselesi) directed by İsa Yıldız & Murat Onbul
- Future Lasts Forever (Turkish: Gelecek Uzun Sürer) directed by Özcan Alper
- Hidden Lives (Turkish: Saklı Hayatlar) directed by A. Haluk Ünal
- Home (Turkish: Yurt) directed by Muzatffer Özdemir
- Losers' Club (Turkish: Kaybedenler Kulübü) directed by Tolga Örnek
- Love and Revolution (Turkish: Aşk ve Devrim) directed by F. Serkan Acar
- Love Me (Turkish: Beni Sev) directed by Ali Özgentürk
- September (Turkish: Eylül) directed by Cemil Ağacıkoğlu
- Simurg directed by Ruhi Karadağ
- Snake (Turkish: Mar) directed by Caner Erzincan
- The Body (Turkish: Vücut) directed by Mustafa Nuri
- The Extremely Tragic Story of Celal Tan and His Family (Turkish: Celal Tan ve Ailesinin Aşırı Acıklı Hikayesi) directed by Onur Ünlü
- Turkish Passport (Turkish: Türk Pasaportu) directed by Burak Cem Arlıel
- Velvet / The Great Mother (Turkish: Kadife / Büyük Ana) directed by Erdoğan Kar

=== National Student Films Competition ===
Seven documentary films, seven animation films, ten experimental films, ten fictional films by undergraduate students studying at cinema and television departments of Turkey's communications and fine arts faculties were selected from the 180 films that were submitted to compete in the festival's National Student Films Competition.

=== Mediterranean Short Film Competition ===
Twelve documentary films, eighteen animation films, fourteen experimental films and forty-two fictional films were selected from the 526 films from 25 countries that were submitted to compete in the festival's Mediterranean Short Film Competition.

== Screening Sections ==
=== Retrospective: Derviş Zaim ===
Turkish Cypriot director Derviş Zaim, who headed the National Feature Film Competition Jury, received a retrospective of six of his works.

- Dot (Turkish: Nokta)
- Elephants and Grass (Turkish: Filler ve Çimen)
- Mud (Turkish: Çamur)
- Shadows and Faces (Turkish: Gölgeler ve Suretler)
- Somersault in a Coffin (Turkish: Tabutta Rövasata)
- Waiting for Heaven (Turkish: Cenneti Beklerken)

=== Turkish Premiere: Once Upon a Time in Anatolia ===
The director was in attendance for the Turkish premiere of his 2011 Cannes Film Festival Grand Prix-winning film, as well as an exhibition of his photographic works.

- Once Upon a Time in Anatolia (Turkish: Bir Zamanlar Anadolu'da) directed by Nuri Bilge Ceylan

=== World Cinema ===
A selection of nine internationally acclaimed films, including the latest from American director Woody Allen.

- Above Us Only Sky (German: Über uns das All) directed by Jan Schomburg
- Amnesty directed by Bujar Alimani
- Apnea directed by Ari Bafalouka
- Karen Cries in a Bus (Spanish: Karen llora en un bus) directed by Gabriel Rojas Vera
- Man without a Cell Phone directed by Sameh Zoab
- Midnight in Paris directed by Woody Allen
- Parked directed by Darragh Byrne
- The House (Slovak: Dom) directed by Zuzana Liová
- Tomorrow Will Be Better (Polish: Jutro będzie lepiej) directed by Dorata Kedzierzawska

=== The Desert of the Real ===
A selection of critically acclaimed documentaries were screened under the title "The Desert of the Real" (Turkish: Gerçeğin Çölü).

=== I am Asian, I am African ===
Tunisian film critic Hassouna Mansouri and Lebanese director Bahij Hojeij were among the panel for the related discussion at the Metropolitan Municipality Theater Hall.

== See also ==
- 2011 in film
- Turkish films of 2011
