= Ali Düşenkalkar =

Cypriot actor

- Born: 1961 (age 64–65); Nicosia, Northern Cyprus
- Education: Mimar Sinan University
- Occupation: Actor
- Years active: 1983–present

Ali Düşenkalkar (born 1961) is a Turkish Cypriot actor.

== Biography ==
Ali Düşenkalkar graduated in theatre from Mimar Sinan University State Conservatory in 1983, following which he joined the İstanbul State Theatre. Düşenkalkar has acted in, and directed over 40 plays as well as appeared in several films and TV series, notably Reha Erdem's films Kaç Para Kaç and Korkuyorum Anne, Gani Müjde's film Osmanlı Cumhuriyeti, Tolga Örnek's film Devrim Arabaları and the TV adaptation of Orhan Kemal's novel Hanımın Çiftliği. He won several awards for his performance in Korkuyorum Anne including 'Best Actor' awards at the 16th Ankara Film Festival and the 14th Sadri Alışık Awards.

His younger sister is the actress Munis Düşenkalkar.

== Filmography ==
Year	Title	Role
1988.	A Ay	
1997.	Baba Evi	
1998.	Deniz bekliyorgu	
1999.	Kac Para Kac	Casher
2004.	Korkuroyum Anne	Ali
2005	Erkek Tarafi	Baki
2005	Seni cok ozledim	Mahmut
2005	Odunc hayat	Taner
2006	Ruya gibi	
2006	Kiz babasi	Fikri
2006	Kacan Firsatlar Limited	Fuat
2006-2008	Ezo Gelin	
2007	Hayat apartmani	
2008	Osmanli Cumhuriyeti	Ibrahim Pasha
2008	Hayat var	Hayati
2008	Devrim arabalari	
2009-2011	Hanımın Çiftliği	Kabak Hafis
2010	Kukuriku Kadin Kralligi	Duburuk
2011	Luks Otel	Cumali
2011	Ay buyurken uyuyaman	Papaz Hristo
2012	Enterchat	
2012-2014	Dila Hanım	Canip
2016	5 Dakkada Degisir Butun Isler	Kemal
2017	Hep Yek 2	
2017	Aslanlar ve ceylanlar	
2017	Muhtesem Yuzyil Kosem	Cinci Hoca
2017	Babam	Bacanak
2017	Kayitdisi	Sabri
2018	Aşk ve Mavi	Muntaz
2020	The Hunt	Ibrahim
2020-2024	Gönül Dağı	Duguncu Muammer
2021	Bize Musaade	Lutfu
2022	Malazgirt 1071	
2023-2024	Ömer	Izzet Ademoglu
2024	Hain	
2025	Askin Dünkü Çocuklari	Sömelek Riza
2026–	Mehmed: Fetihler Sultani	Rum Mehmed Pasha
