= Sonbahar =

Sonbahar may refer to:

- Autumn (2008 film), Turkish title Sonbahar, a 2008 film by Özcan Alper
- Sonbahar (Autumn), a 1959 film by Turkish director Türker İnanoğlu
- "Sonbahar", a song by Mor ve Ötesi from their album Başıbozuk
