= Yeşilçam Academy Award =

National film award of Turkey presented in 2012

- Awarded for: Best in film
- Country: Turkey
- Presented by: Yeşilçam Film Academy
- First award: 2012

The Yeşilçam Academy Award was the national film award of Turkey, which was presented by the Yeşilçam Film Academy (YEFA) in 2012. The award, which was named after Yeşilçam Street in the Beyoğlu district of Istanbul where many film studios were based during the 1950s-1970s, was created by the Alliance of Cinema Labour Unions' Yeşilçam Film Academy (YEFA) in protest against Turkish Foundation of Cinema and Audiovisual Culture (TÜRSAK)'s disregard of their suggestions to give the Yeşilçam Award, which had been awarded from 2008 to 2011, a more professional structure. The Turkish Ministry of Culture and Tourism and the Beyoğlu Municipality, who had been organizers along with TÜRSAK of the previous awards, failed to offer their support to this new award. The First Yeşilçam Film Academy Awards, which was held on June 4, 2012 at the Cemal Reşit Rey Concert Hall (CRRKS) and broadcast live on the A Haber news channel, were described as a mess and have not been held again.

== Awards ==
Editions
1st Yeşilçam Academy Awards (June 4, 2012)

=== Best Film Award ===
- 2012: Once Upon a Time in Anatolia (Turkish: Bir Zamanlar Anadolu’da) directed by Nuri Bilge Ceylan

=== Best Director Award ===
- 2012: Nuri Bilge Ceylan for Once Upon a Time in Anatolia (Turkish: Bir Zamanlar Anadolu’da)

=== Best Actor Award ===
- 2012: Taner Birsel for Once Upon a Time in Anatolia (Turkish: Bir Zamanlar Anadolu’da)

=== Best Actress Award ===
- 2012: Rüçhan Çalışkur for Turkan

=== Best Supporting Actor Award ===
- 2012: Firat Tanis for Once Upon a Time in Anatolia (Turkish: Bir Zamanlar Anadolu’da)

=== Best Supporting Actress Award ===
- 2012: Idil Firat for Pomegranate (Turkish: Nar)

=== Best Cinematography Award ===
- 2012: Gökhan Tiryak for Once Upon a Time in Anatolia (Turkish: Bir Zamanlar Anadolu’da)

=== Best Editing Award ===
- 2012: Bora Gökşingöl & Nuri Bilge Ceylan for Once Upon a Time in Anatolia (Turkish: Bir Zamanlar Anadolu’da)

=== Best Screenplay Award ===
- 2012: Nuri Bilge Ceylan, Ebru Ceylan & Ercan Kesal for Once Upon a Time in Anatolia (Turkish: Bir Zamanlar Anadolu’da)

=== Best Music Award ===
- 2012: Ozan Colakoglu for Love Likes Coincidences (Turkish: Aşk Tesadüfleri Sever)

=== Best Art Direction ===
- 2012: Elif Taşçıoğlu for Shadows and Faces (Turkish: Gölgeler ve Suretler)

=== Best Makeup ===
- 2012: Mine Külcü & Deniz Görkem Duran for Once Upon a Time in Anatolia (Turkish: Bir Zamanlar Anadolu’da)

=== Best Hair ===
- 2012: Derya Ergün for The Extremely Tragic Story of Celal Tan and His Family (Turkish: Celal Tan ve Ailesinin Aşırı Acıklı Hikayesi)

=== Best Costume Design ===
- 2012: Hussein Özinal for Shadows and Faces (Turkish: Gölgeler ve Suretler)

=== Best Sound ===
- 2012: Okan Selçuk & Mehmet Kılıçel for Once Upon a Time in Anatolia (Turkish: Bir Zamanlar Anadolu’da)

=== Best Sound Design ===
- 2012: Thomas Robert for Once Upon a Time in Anatolia (Turkish: Bir Zamanlar Anadolu’da)

=== Best Digital Effects ===
- 2012: 1000 Volt for Love Likes Coincidences (Turkish: Aşk Tesadüfleri Sever)

=== Best Documentary ===
- 2012: Last Nomads in Anatolia: Sarıkeçililer (Turkish: Anadolu’nun Son Göçerleri Sarı Keçililer) directed by Yüksel Aksu

=== Best Short Film ===
- 2012: Magnus Nottingham directed by Ayçe Kartal

=== Box Office Smasher ===
- 2012: Eyyvah Eyvah 2 directed by Hakan Algül

== See also ==
- Yeşilçam Award
