= Losers' Club =

2011 film by Tolga Örnek

- Theatrical poster
- Directed by: Tolga Örnek
- Written by: Tolga Örnek; Mehmet A. Öztekin
- Produced by: Murat Dörtbudak; Kemal Kaplanoğlu; Tolga Örnek; Neslihan Dörtbudak
- Starring: Nejat İşler; Yiğit Özşener; Ahu Türkpençe; İdil Fırat
- Cinematography: Burak Kanbir
- Edited by: Haluk Arus
- Music by: Erdem Tarabuş; Cavit Ergun; Can Göksu
- Production company: Ekip Film
- Distributed by: Tiglon Film
- Release date: March 25, 2011
- Running time: 110 minutes
- Country: Turkey
- Language: Turkish
- Box office: US$2,864,818

Losers' Club (Turkish: Kaybedenler Kulübü) is a 2011 Turkish comedy-drama film, co-written and directed by Tolga Örnek based on a true story, starring Nejat İşler and Yiğit Özşener as the co-hosts of a controversial mid-90s Istanbul radio show. The film, which opened on March 25, 2011 at number 2 in the Turkish box office, is one of the highest grossing Turkish films of 2011.

== Production ==
The film was shot on location in Kadıköy, Istanbul, Turkey.

== Synopsis ==
Kaan and Mete, co-hosts of a mid 1990s radio show called Kaybedenler Kulübü (Losers' Club), struggle to deal with their daily lives after their show becomes an instant hit. Kaan meets Zeynep, the girl of his dreams, but their relationship comes under pressure as the show continues to stir controversy and attract fans from every segment of Istanbul society.

== Cast ==
- Nejat Isler – Kaan
- Yiğit Özşener – Mete
- Ahu Türkpençe – Zeynep
- İdil Fırat – Asli
- Rıza Kocaoğlu – Murat
- Serra Yılmaz – Mother
- Barış Bağcı – Devrim

== Release and reception ==
The film opened on nationwide general release in 145 screens across Turkey on March 25, 2011 at number 2 in the national box office with a first weekend gross of US$ 428,961.

=== Festival screenings ===
- 18th International Adana Golden Boll Film Festival (September 17–25, 2011)
- Turkish Movie Days, Helsinki (September 29 – October 1, 2011)

=== Awards ===
- 18th International Adana Golden Boll Film Festival (September 17–25, 2011)
  - Best Sound Effects: Burak Topalakçı (won, also for September)

== See also ==
- Turkish films of 2011
- 2011 in film
