= Hanımın Çiftliği (TV series) =

Turkish television series

- Also known as: The Lady's Farm
- Created by: Orhan Kemal
- Based on: Hanımın Çiftliği by Orhan Kemal
- Written by: Zülküf Yücel
- Directed by: Faruk Teber
- Starring: Mehmet Aslantuğ; Özgü Namal; Caner Cindoruk; Fikret Kuşkan; Ebru Özkan; Mehmet Çevik; Necip Memili; Ali Düsenkallar; Hakan Boyav; Can Kolukisa; Zuhal Gencer; Işik Aras; Nazan Ayas
- Country of origin: Turkey
- Original language: Turkish
- No. of seasons: 2
- No. of episodes: 70

Production
- Producer: Faruk Turgut
- Production location: Adana
- Running time: 60 minutes

Original release
- Network: Kanal D
- Release: 4 September 2009 – 17 June 2011

Hanımın Çiftliği (English: Lady's Farm) is a Turkish drama series. It is third adaptation of Orhan Kemal's novel Hanımın Çiftliği. It has been very praised and won numerous awards.

== Plot ==
The plot sets around a poor worker girl named Güllü. She works in a factory and is constantly mistreated by her father and older brother. She is in love with a man named Kemal, a factory worker as well, and they wish to get married but her father won't let her because he wants her to marry Ramazan, the nephew of the factory owner. As the story develops Kemal and Güllü plan to run away together but are stopped by her older brother who comes after them with a gun. Kemal manages to take the gun from Güllü's brother and shoots him, but is arrested by the police for that crime. As Kemal ends up in prison, Güllü is beaten worse than before for refusing to marry Ramazan. Her mother cannot stand to see her daughter be abused like this and goes to the prison to persuade Kemal to tell Güllü he does not love her anymore, so she will marry Ramazan. After hearing about the continuing abuse, Kemal agrees to do this and sends Güllü a letter telling her to do what her father says. Güllü feels as she has nothing to live for anymore and finally agrees to marry Ramazan. As Ramazan takes Güllü to his uncles farm to marry her there, his uncle spots her and falls madly in love with her. Güllü who absolutely resents Ramazan, agrees to marry his uncle Muzaffer instead even though she doesn't love him. Muzaffer is the factory owner and is extremely wealthy compared to most of the town. As their marriage evolves Güllü starts to fall in love with Muzaffer and they become very happy together. In the later episodes, while Güllü is pregnant, Muzaffer is killed and Güllü is left to run the factory and farm all by herself. Her father and brother still try to interfere with her life but being wealthier and more powerful, she does not let them.

The other factory workers are working twelve hours a day and are not getting paid for some of them and since Güllü knows what they are going through, having been a worker herself, they ask her to improve their conditions.

As the story develops, Güllü tries to make some changes in the factory, deal with her family and find out who murdered her husband. The police then find out that the killer is Güllü's brother, Hamza. Knowing that Hamza cannot plot such thing on his own, the police question him to find out who forced him into killing Muzaffer. After many hours of questioning, Hamza admits that Zekai, the man who manages Muzaffer's factory is the actual killer who ordered him to murder Muzaffer in order to get money. Then Zekai gets arrested and he himself cannot bear the environment of the prison, so he commits suicide hanging himself while he is locked up inside the prison. Then 1½ years later, Hamza gets death sentenced/executed by court along with imprisonment for the crime of murdering Muzaffer, i.e. he gets death sentenced by the court being hung.

Then couple of months later in the meantime, Güllü meets up with Kemal and they fall in love with each other again. During their wedding, the factory workers burn Güllü's house because they didn't get paid. However Güllü did pay their salary selling some plots of her own land, but it was Salim, the factory manager who didn't pay the money to the factory workers on behalf of their salary as per Khalida's order, so they angrily harm Güllü burning her mansion. When Güllü and Kemal find out that the mansion is on fire, they realize that Güllü's baby, Ali, is in there. Kemal quickly runs in and saves the baby, then he however ends up dying. Years later, Ali is a little young boy and they live together in a faraway farm cottage happily.

== Other Adaptations ==
- 1972 film - Vukuat Var - It starring Kartal Tibet, Türkan Şoray.
- 1990 mini series - Hanımın Çiftliği

== International broadcasters ==
- Iran on PMC as عمارت سراب (Lady's farm)
- Pakistan on Hum Sitaray as Wadi e Ishq
- Northern Cyprus on Kanal D as Hanımın Çiftliği
- North Macedonia on Kanal 5 and A1 as Имотот на дамата (Lady's farm)
- Serbia on RTV Pink as Nasleđe jedne dame
- Montenegro on Pink M as Nasleđe jedne dame
- Bosnia and Herzegovina on Pink BH as Nasleđe jedne dame
- Croatia on Nova TV and Doma TV as Polja nade
- Morocco on 2M TV as ماتنسانيش (Don't forget me)
- United Arab Emirates on Sama Dubai as سيدة المزرعة (Lady's farm)
- Egypt on Alhayat TV as سيدة المزرعة (Lady's farm)
- Tunisia on Nessma TV as سيدة المزرعة (Lady's farm)
- Lebanon on Future TV as سيدة المزرعة (Lady's farm)
- Romania on Kanal D as Stăpâna inimii
