= Dolmabahce Agreement =

Dolmabahçe Agreement
2015 Dolmabahçe Agreement
- Type: Political declaration
- Drafted: 28 February 2015
- Location: Dolmabahçe Palace, Istanbul, Turkey
- Condition: Informal declaration; not legally binding
- Parties: AKP government's representative HDP delegation
- Language: Turkish

The Dolmabahçe Agreement (Turkish: Dolmabahçe Mutabakatı, 28 February 2015, Dolmabahçe Palace, Istanbul, Turkey) was a significant milestone in the 2013-2015 PKK-Turkey peace process (aka Solution Process) related to the Kurdish issue and the PKK insurgency. The agreement refers to a 10‑point joint declaration aimed to signal the governmental party (AKP), pro-Kurdish party (HDP) and the Kurdistan Workers’ Party (PKK)'s commitment to a roadmap for Turkey's peace and democratic reform processes (Çözüm Süreci). It resulted from a meeting at Dolmabahçe Palace between government officials and representatives associated with the HDP and the İmralı delegation.

== Context ==
As part of the Solution Process started in early 2013, Turkish officials—including Deputy Prime Minister Yalçın Akdoğan, Interior Minister Efkan Ala, and HDP deputies Sırrı Süreyya Önder, İdris Baluken, and Pervin Buldan—held discussions on conflict resolution. The gathering culminated in a public statement outlining key principles for democratic politics and peace.

== Ten points declaration ==
Deputy Prime Minister Yalcın Akdogan, Minister of Interior Efkan Ala and People's Democracy Party (HDP) Sırrı Süreyya Önder (Istanbul MP), Idris Baluken and Pervin Buldan announced the roadmap with the following thematic axis to work on:

1. Definition and content of democratic politics
2. Defining the national and local dimensions of a democratic resolution
3. Legal and democratic guarantees of free citizenship
4. Relationship between democratic politics, the state, and society, and steps toward institutionalization
5. Socio-economic dimensions of the resolution process
6. Addressing the relationship between democracy and security during the resolution process in a way that protects public order and freedoms
7. Legal solutions and guarantees concerning women's issues, culture, and ecological problems
8. Developing a pluralistic democratic approach to the concept, definition, and recognition of identity
9. Support for a democratic republic, common homeland, and nation based on democratic criteria, and ensuring citizen's legal and constitutional guarantees within a pluralistic democratic system
10. A new constitution aiming to internalize all these democratic initiatives and transformations

== Reception and turn back ==
While the HDP and its affiliated İmralı delegation hailed the Dolmabahçe Agreement as a historic advance for peace and democratization, government figures soon distanced themselves from the term "agreement" (mutabakat). After the June 2015 general election AKP set back, on 17 July, President Recep Tayyip Erdoğan publicly renounced the phrase, asserting that formal consensus on national issues belongs in parliament, not in such bi-partisan declarations. Similarly, Mahir Ünal, then Minister of Culture and Tourism, framed the outcome as a bi-parties “declaration” rather than a binding “agreement” and emphasized the absence of formal signatures. Political scientists pointed out to AKP need to highten nationalist sentiment and to walk away from the Peace Process with Kurdish parties.

== Legacy and Calls for Revival ==
Over the following years, the HDP renewed calls for reinstating the principles of the Dolmabahçe declaration, viewing it as a directional template for a democratic and peaceful Turkey. On anniversaries—such as in 2021 and 2022—the party renewed public statements urging a return to the Dolmabahçe framework.

== See also ==
- 2013–2015 PKK–Turkey peace process
- June 2015 Turkish general election
- Ceylanpınar incident
