= Adana Cinema Museum =

Turkish museum with a focus on cinema

Coordinates: 36.9884553°N 35.3297762°E

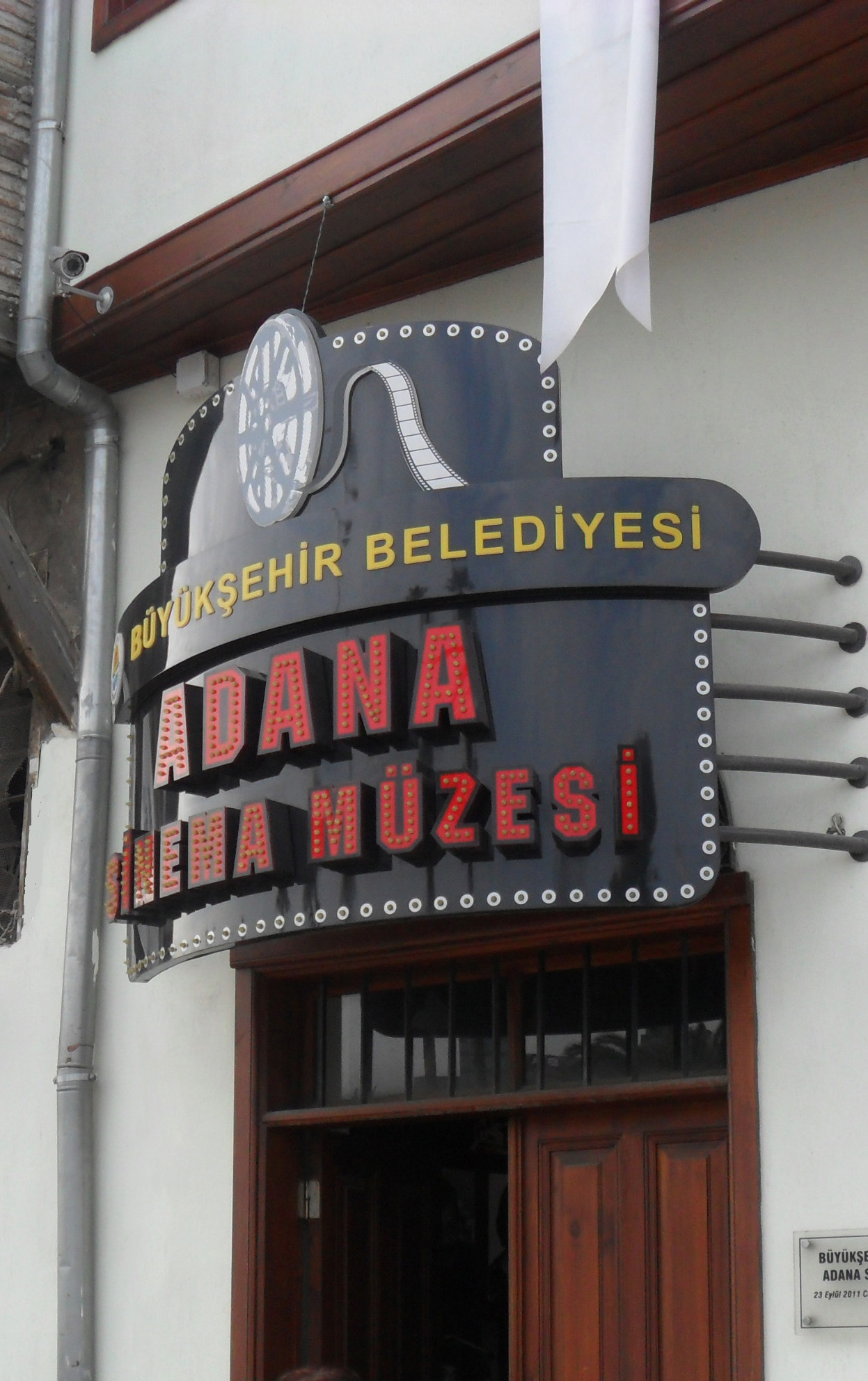
- Established: 23 September 2011; 15 years ago
- Location: Kayalıbağ Mah. Seyhan Cad. 35, Adana, Turkey
- Type: Cinema

Adana Cinema Museum (Turkish: Adana Sinema Müzesi) is a museum in Adana, Turkey, dedicated to the cinema of Turkey, in particular in relation with cinema people like screenwriters, producers, directors and actors native to the city. Established in 2011 in a restored old Adana house in Seyhan.

== Location ==
The museum is located on the corner of Seyhan Cad. and 26025 Sok. in Kayalıbağ neighborhood of Seyhan district in Adana, southern Turkey.

== Overview ==
The museum is in a two-storey, merged building of two historic row houses in the west of Seyhan River. The building was renovated to its original by the Adana Metropolitan Municipality. The museum was established on 23 September 2011. It is home to the 1969-established Adana Golden Boll Film Festival.

The Adana Cinema Museum, which reveals the history of cinema in Turkey, contains works dating back to the 1940s, wax statues of legendary actors, colorful sections from Yeşilçam films that are still actively watched, photographs of actors, interviews and awards and the Cinema Library.

The ground floor of the museum is reserved for the movie posters. At least one name in each poster (director, actor, scriptwriter etc.) belongs to a citizen of Adana.

In the first floor, there is a room exhibiting the photos, movie posters and belongings of the renowned Turkish actor Yılmaz Güney (1937–1984). There are life-size figures of Yılmaz Güney, painter Abidin Dino (1913–1993) and author Orhan Kemal (1914–1970). Photos and artifacts on display of other well-known people from Adana associated with cinema are writer Yaşar Kemal (1923–2015), actor Şener Şen (born 1941) and his father actor Ali Şen (1918–1989), Şahin Kaygun, Muzaffer İzgü (1933–2017), Ali Özgentürk (born 1947), Orhan Duru, İrfan Atasoy, Yılmaz Köksal (1951–2016), Aytaç Arman (1949–2019), Bilal İnci, Meral Zeren (born 1956), Menderes Samancılar (born 1954), Nurhan Tekerek and Mahmut Hekimoğlu (1955–2016). The wax statues in the museum were made by Jale Kuşan and Tülay Aktaş.

There is also a library in the museum. It contains 3,500 books, the oldest of which dates back to 1891, donated by film historian Alberto Modiano (born 1960).
