= September (2011 film) =

- Theatrical Poster
- Directed by: Cemil Ağacıkoğlu
- Written by: Cemil Ağacıkoğlu
- Produced by: Türker Korkmaz
- Starring: Turgay Aydın; Görkem Yeltan; Elena Polyanskaya; Mete Dönmezer; Ayten Uncuoğlu; Serkan Keskin
- Cinematography: Ali Olcay Gözkaya
- Edited by: Taner Sarf
- Music by: Doğan Duru
- Production company: Arti Productions
- Distributed by: Medyavizyon
- Release date: September 30, 2011
- Running time: 84 minutes
- Country: Turkey
- Language: Turkish

September (Turkish: Eylül) is a 2011 Turkish drama film written and directed by Cemil Ağacıkoğlu and starring Turgay Aydın and Görkem Yeltan as an introverted couple who encounter a maltreated young woman. The film, which went on nationwide general release across Turkey on September 30, 2011, was awarded Best Director and Best Actress at the 18th International Adana Golden Boll Film Festival (September 17–25, 2011) and premiered in competition at the 35th Montreal World Film Festival (August 18–28, 2011).
