= Orhan Kemal Literature Museum =

- Orhan Kemal Müzesi
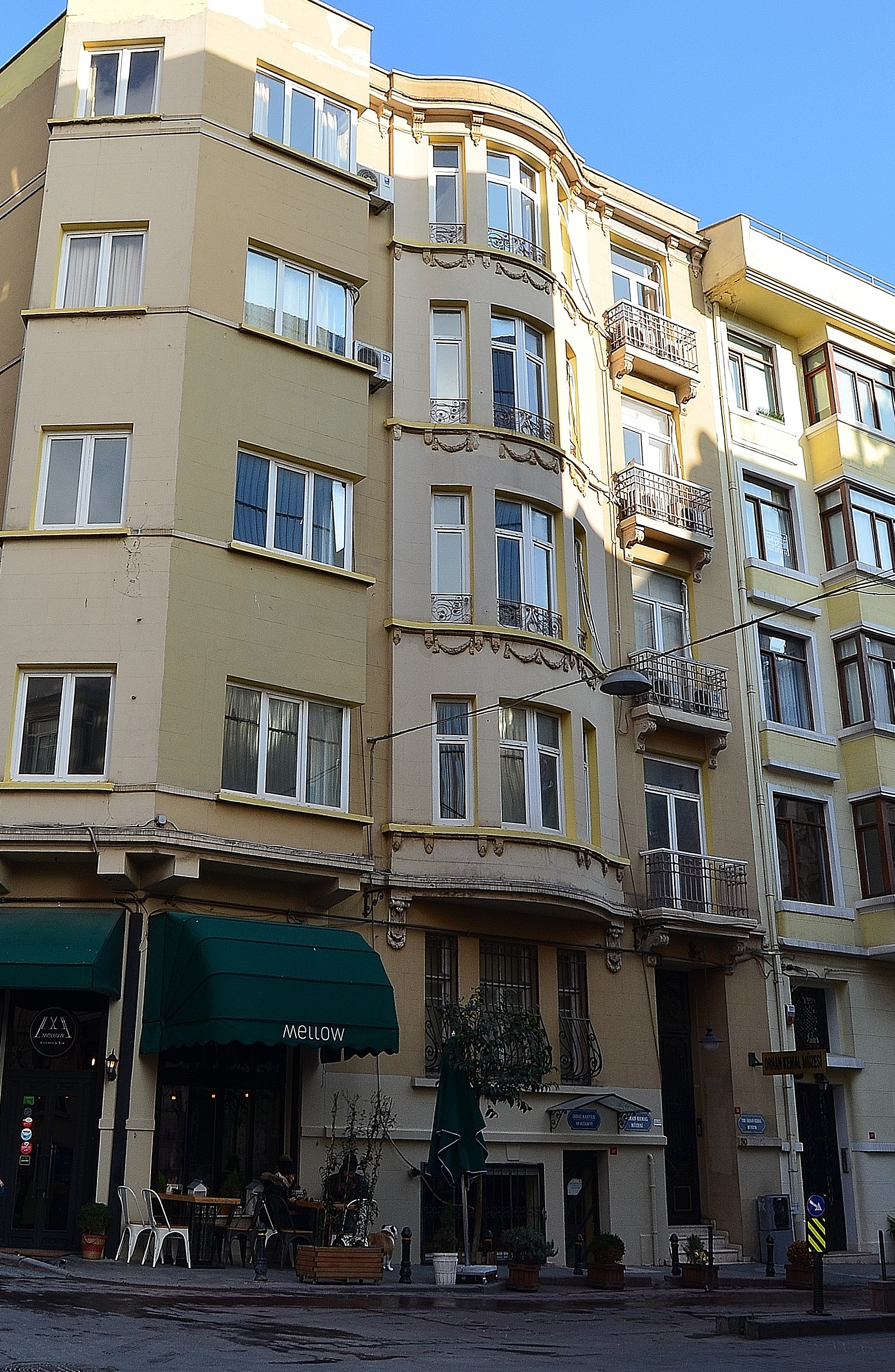
- Building of Orhan Kemal Museum in Cihangir, Istanbul, Turkey

- Location of Orhan Kemal Literature Museum in Istanbul, Turkey.
- Location: Akarsu Yokuşu 30, Cihangir; Beyoğlu, Istanbul, Turkey
- Coordinates: 41.03055°N 28.98357°E
- Type: Living museum, literary museum
- Website: www.orhankemal.org

The Orhan Kemal Literature Museum (Turkish: Orhan Kemal Müzesi) is a literary museum and archive in Istanbul, Turkey dedicated to Turkish literature, and named after novelist Orhan Kemal (1914–1970).

Established with the support of Orhan Kemal Culture and Arts Center, the museum is situated in a five-story building in Cihangir neighborhood of Beyoğlu. On display are photographs about his private life taken by Ara Güler, family photographs, original first edition of his books, his private letters, critics, articles and dissertations about his works. His study room contains his typewriter and many other personal belongings. His death mask is also exhibited in the museum. The building houses a bibliothek and a cafeteria for visitors.

It is accessible by walking from Taksim Square, and is open from 9:00 to 18:00 local time except Sundays. Admission is free of charge.
