= Orhan Kemal Cultural Centre =

Cultural complex in Adana, Turkey

Coordinates: 35°16′18″N 37°02′25″E

- Çukurova Belediyesi Kültür Merkezi
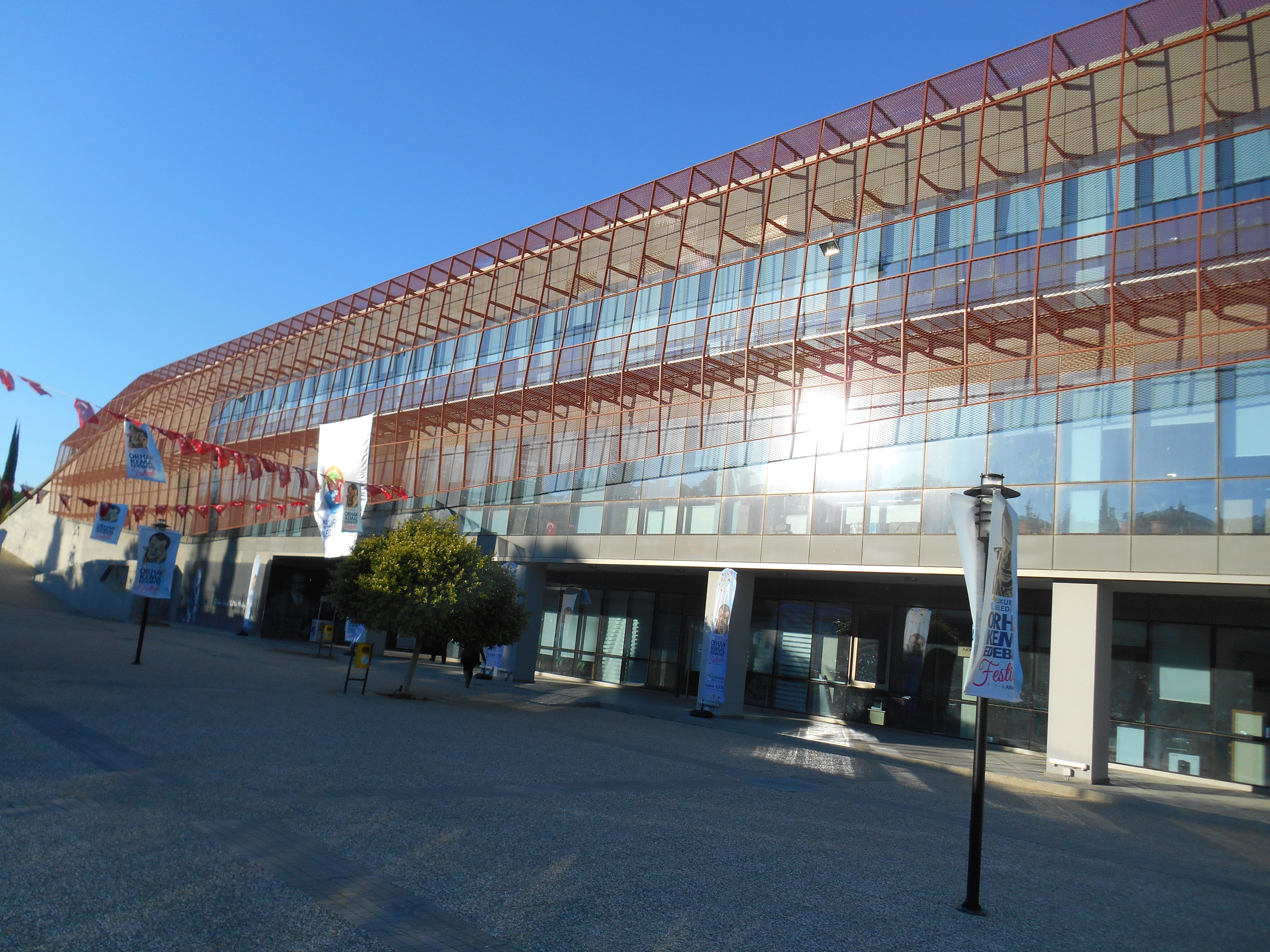
- Interactive map of Orhan Kemal Cultural Centre
- Address: Belediye Evleri mah., Çukurova; Adana; Turkey
- Owner: Çukurova Municipality
- Capacity: 600 (theater hall)
- Type: Cultural complex
- Current use: Theatre, Exhibition Hall, School of Art

Construction
- Opened: 20 September 2013

Orhan Kemal Cultural Centre (Turkish: Orhan Kemal Kültür Merkezi) is a complex in the Çukurova district of Adana, that is composed of a theatre hall, three exhibition halls and a school of arts. The center is located next to the Çukurova Municipality Hall, on Türkmenbaşı Boulevard. The cultural centre was opened on September 20, 2013, together with the City Hall and the Town Park. The centre was initially named the Çukurova Municipality Cultural Centre. On January 7, 2015, the cultural center was renamed 'Orhan Kemal Kültür Merkezi' at the centennial of Orhan Kemal, one of the most productive Turkish novelists who died in 1970.

== The Center ==
600-seater theatre hall of the center hosts the Çukurova Town Theatre and community theater groups. Çukurova Town Theatre performs every Tuesday here from October to May.

Turhan Selçuk School of Arts is a facility for learning photography, caricature and drawing.
