= Wrong Rosary =

- Theatrical poster
- Directed by: Mahmut Fazıl Çoşkun
- Written by: Tarık Tufan; Görkem Yeltan; Bektaş Topaloğlu
- Produced by: Tülin Çetinkol
- Starring: Nadir Sarıbacak; Görkem Yeltan; Ersan Uysal
- Cinematography: Refik Çakar
- Music by: Rahman Altın
- Production company: Hokus Fokus
- Distributed by: Özen Film, Filmpot
- Release dates: April 2009 (Istanbul Film Festival); March 19, 2010
- Running time: 90 mins.
- Country: Turkey
- Language: Turkish

Wrong Rosary (Turkish: Uzak İhtimal) is a 2009 Turkish drama film directed by Mahmut Fazıl Çoşkun.

== Reception ==
=== Awards ===
- 38th International Film Festival Rotterdam - Tiger Award (Won)

== See also ==
- 2009 in film
- Turkish films of 2009
