= Meral Okay =

Turkish actress and screenwriter (1959-2012)

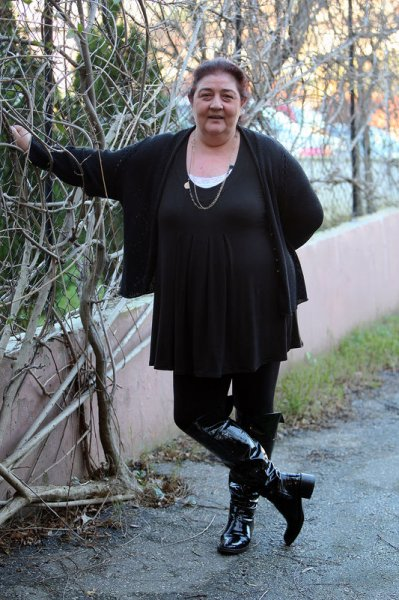
- Born: Meral Katı; September 20, 1959; Ankara, Turkey
- Died: April 9, 2012 (aged 52); Istanbul, Turkey
- Resting place: Zincirlikuyu Cemetery, Istanbul
- Occupations: Actress, film producer and screenwriter
- Notable work: Second Spring, Muhteşem Yüzyıl
- Spouse: Yaman Okay (m. 1984–1993; his death)

Meral Okay (Turkish pronunciation: [meˈɾal oˈkaj], née Katı; September 20, 1959 – April 9, 2012) was a Turkish actress, film producer and screenwriter.

== Early life ==
Okay was born on September 20, 1959, in Ankara to military judge Ata Katı and Türkan as the second child. During her childhood, she moved with her family across Turkey due to her father's duty. After completing the high school in Ankara, she began working at the governmental agency "Turkish Grain Board" (Turkish: Toprak Mahsulleri Ofisi, TMO).

During the 1980 Turkish coup d'état era, she was a member of the socialist Workers Party of Turkey (TİP) and union spokesperson at her workplace.

In 1983, Meral Katı moved to Istanbul to enter the daily Günaydın. She later contributed to the establishment of the publication company "İletişim", and took part in the team that prepared the Turkish edition of Playboy magazin.

She married in 1984 to stage and movie actor Yaman Okay, she had already met in Ankara. Her husband's profession paved her the way for entry into the world of cinema.

== Career ==
Meral Okay became known for roles in Turkish films and television series. She also produced the television series, Second Spring from 1998 to 2001. For one of her last projects, Okay worked as the main screenwriter for the historical TV series, Muhteşem Yüzyıl, based on the life of Ottoman sultan Suleiman the Magnificent.

== Family life ==
Her husband Yaman Okay died in 1993 at the age of 41 from pancreatic cancer. In the summer months of 2011, Meral Okay was diagnosed with lung cancer. She died from complications of the disease on April 9, 2012, at the age of 52. Following the religious funeral at Bebek Mosque, she was buried beside her husband's grave at the Zincirlikuyu Cemetery.

For her role in the movie Beynelmilel, she was awarded "Best Supporting Actress" at the 2007 International Adana Golden Boll Film Festival.

== Filmography ==
Her notable works are:

=== As actress ===
Year	Film	Notes
1992	Seni Seviyorum Rosa	Film
2001	Yeditepe İstanbul	TV series
1998–2001	Second Spring	TV series
2006	Beynelmilel	Film
2009	Bir Bulut Olsam	TV series

=== As screenwriter ===
Year	Film	Notes
2001	Hiçbiryerde	Film
2001	Yeditepe İstanbul	TV series
2002-2004	Asmalı Konak	TV series
2009	Bir Bulut Olsam	TV series
2011–2012	Muhteşem Yüzyıl	TV series

=== Other ===
Year	Film	Notes
1999	Propaganda	Public relations
2000	Yarın Geç Olmayacak	Producer
2004	İstanbul Şahidimdir	Project designer
2005	Körfez Ateşi	Project consultant
2006	Beynelmilel	Production coordinator
