= Baddiel's Syndrome =

British sitcom

- Genre: Sitcom
- Starring: David Baddiel; Morwenna Banks; Peter Bradshaw; Demetri Goritsas; Kim Thomson
- Country of origin: United Kingdom
- Original language: English
- No. of series: 1
- No. of episodes: 13

Production
- Running time: 25 minutes

Original release
- Network: Sky One
- Release: 14 January – 9 April 2001

Baddiel's Syndrome is a British television sitcom that originally aired on Sky One in 2001. It centred on a therapy-attending architect played by David Baddiel.

== Cast ==
- David Baddiel as David
- Morwenna Banks as Eva Starzia Schnorbitz Melitzskova
- Peter Bradshaw as Peter
- Demetri Goritsas as Ethan
- Kim Thomson as Sian
- Stephen Fry as The Psychiatrist
- Jonathan Bailey as Josh
- Gareth Thomas as Colin
- Alex Leam as Frank Skinner

== Episodes ==
No.	Title	Original release date
1	"Hypnotherapy"	14 January 2001
2	"Dead Grandma"	21 January 2001
3	"The Skip"	28 January 2001
4	"Huffa"	4 February 2001
5	"Hair Today"	11 February 2001
6	"Transference"	18 February 2001
7	"Nut Allergy"	25 February 2001
8	"In the Valley of the Blind"	5 March 2001
9	"Calligrula"	12 March 2001
10	"Dream Home"	19 March 2001
11	"Inventions Now"	26 March 2001
12	"En-Suite"	2 April 2001
13	"Religious Uncertainties"	9 April 2001
