= Future Lasts Forever =

Future Lasts Forever (Gelecek Uzun Sürer)
- Theatrical Poster
- Directed by: Özcan Alper
- Written by: Özcan Alper
- Produced by: Soner Alper; Ersin Çelik
- Starring: Gaye Gürsel; Durukan Ordu; Sarkis Seropyan; Osman Karakoç; Erdal Kırık; Güllü Özalp Ulusoy; Asiye Dinçsoy
- Cinematography: Feza Çaldıran
- Edited by: Ayhan Ergürsel; Thomas Balkenhol; Özcan Alper; Umut Sakallıoğlu
- Music by: Mustafa Biber
- Production company: Nar Film
- Distributed by: Tiglon Film
- Release date: November 11, 2011
- Running time: 112 minutes
- Country: Turkey
- Languages: Turkish (main), Kurdish, Armenian

Future Lasts Forever (Turkish: Gelecek Uzun Sürer) is a 2011 Turkish drama film, written and directed by Özcan Alper, starring Gaye Gürsel as an Istanbul music student who travels to south-east Turkey to record traditional music and confront her own past. The film, which will go on nationwide general release across Turkey on November 11, 2011, was awarded 5 prizes at the 18th International Adana Golden Boll Film Festival (September 17–25, 2011) and premiered in competition at the 36th Toronto International Film Festival (September 8–18, 2011).

== Release and reception ==
=== Festival screenings ===
- World Premiere: 36th Toronto International Film Festival (September 8–18, 2011)
- 18th International Adana Golden Boll Film Festival (September 17–25, 2011)

=== Awards ===
- 18th International Adana Golden Boll Film Festival (September 17–25, 2011)
  - Best Actor: Durukan Ordu (won)
  - Best Music: Mustafa Biber (won)
  - Best Cinematography: Feza Çaldıran (won)
  - Yılmaz Güney Award (won)
  - Turkish Film Critics Association (SİYAD) Best Film Award (won)

== See also ==
- Turkish films of 2011
- 2011 in film
