= The International (2006 film) =

The International Beynelmilel
- Theatrical poster
- Directed by: Sırrı Süreyya Önder; Muharrem Gülmez
- Written by: Sırrı Süreyya Önder
- Produced by: Necati Akpınar
- Starring: Cezmi Baskın; Özgü Namal; Umut Kurt; Bahri Beyat; Meral Okay; Nazmi Kirik
- Cinematography: Gökhan Atılmış
- Music by: Sırrı Süreyya Önder; Aytekin Ataş
- Distributed by: Kenda
- Release date: 29 December 2006
- Running time: 105 minutes
- Country: Turkey
- Language: Turkish

The International (Turkish: Beynelmilel) is a 2006 Turkish comedy-drama film, directed by Muharrem Gülmez and Sırrı Süreyya Önder, about a group of local musicians preparing to play at a large military parade in a small town near Adana, Turkey. The film, which went on general release across Turkey on December 29, 2006, won awards at film festivals in Adana, Ankara, Istanbul and Thessalonika. It was also entered into the 29th Moscow International Film Festival.

== Plot ==
In 1982, a small town near Adana is preparing for a big military parade. A group of local musicians are to perform at the event. Gülendam, the daughter of Abuzer, one of the musicians, is preparing for university. Her boyfriend, Haydar, a left-wing activist, gives a record of The International which he possessed to Gülendam for safekeeping because he is afraid to be discovered with it. As she secretly listens to the record in longing with her boyfriend her father Abuzer hears the tune. Unawares of what the music is and what it represents, he decides to base the performance of his band on it for the parade to be given in honor of an official visit from the capital. This comedy of errors leads to a sad outcome. Abuzer and the members of his band get arrested and imprisoned for performing The Internationale. As an outcome of this episode, Güiendam and her provincial girlfriends become more aware of the political issues and decide to support more decidedly the left-wing university students.

== Cast ==
- Cezmi Baskın as Abuzer Yayladalı
- Özgü Namal as Gülendam
- Umut Kurt as Haydar Arıkan
- Bahri Beyat as Mahmut Yayladalı
- Meral Okay as Ayderya Derya
- Nazmi Kirik as Tekin Yayladalı
- Oktay Kaynarca as Major - Commander of The Major Law in the town
- Dilber Ay as Arzum Çilem

== Awards ==
The film won the following awards:

- 14th Altın Koza International Film Festival: Best Film, Best Film (audience award), Best Screenplay (Sırrı Süreyya Önder), Best Actor (Cezmi Baskın), Best Supporting Actress (Meral Okay & Dilber Ay), Best Cinematography (Gökhan Atılmış)
- 18th Ankara Film Festival: Best Film, Onat Kutlar Best Screenplay Award (Sırrı Süreyya Önder)
- Barcelona International Political Films Festival: Audience Award, Jury Special Award
- 26th Istanbul Film Festival: Best Actress (Özgü Namal)
- Pune International Film Festival: Best Actor (Cezmi Baskın)
