= Özgü Namal =

Turkish actress

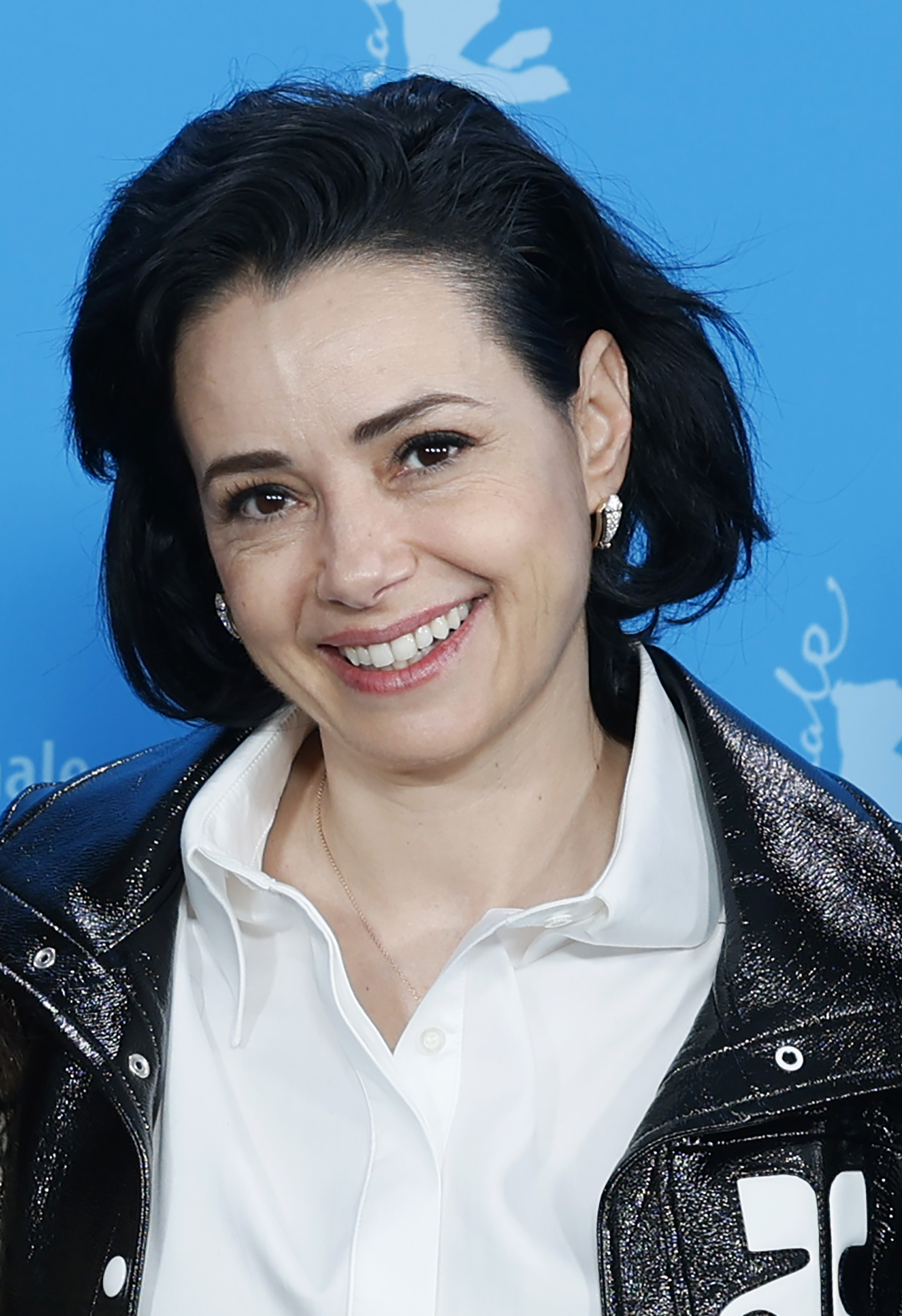
- Namal in 2026
- Born: Melahat Özgü Namal; 28 December 1978 (age 47); Istanbul, Turkey
- Education: Istanbul University State Conservatory
- Occupation: Actress
- Years active: 1998–2015; 2023–present
- Partner: Ahmet Serdar Oral (2014–2020; his death)
- Children: 2

Melahat Özgü Namal (born 28 December 1978) is a Turkish actress.

== Biography ==
Her maternal family are Turkish immigrants from Thessaloniki, Ottoman Empire (now in Greece). Her paternal family are Turkish immigrants from North Macedonia. Özgü Amel Namal started acting at the Masal Gerçek Theatre when she was a child. She graduated from the theater department of the State Conservatory of Istanbul University. She made her television debut in Affet Bizi Hocam and then appeared in the TV series Karete Can, hit series Yeditepe İstanbul, in one of the longest hit series Kurtlar Vadisi as Elif Eylül, "Hanımın Çiftliği" based on a classic novel by Orhan Kemal and "Merhamet" based on a novel by Hande Altaylı.

Namal made her film debut in Sır Çocukları in 2002. Since then, she appeared in several other films such as Anlat İstanbul, Büyü, Organize İşler, Polis, Beynelmilel and O... Çocukları. She was awarded the Golden Orange for Best Actress for her performance in Mutluluk in 2007.

== Filmography ==
=== Television ===
| Year | Title | Role | Notes |
|---|---|---|---|
| 1998 | Affet Bizi Hocam | Nehir | Supporting role |
| 1998 | İkinci Bahar | Öğrenci | Extra |
| 2000 | Karate Can | Zeliha | Leading role |
| 2001 | Bir Filiz Vardı | Young Filiz | mini series |
| 2001 | Cinlerle Periler | Zeynep | guest |
| 2001-2002 | Yeditepe İstanbul | Duru | Leading Role |
| 2002 | Beşibiryerde | Ahu | |
| 2002 | Havada Bulut | Yorgiya | mini series |
| 2003–2005 | Kurtlar Vadisi | Elif Eylül | Leading role |
| 2004 | Hayat Bilgisi | Zuhal Kutluay | Guest |
| 2006 | Bebeğim | Emel Erter | Leading role |
| 2008 | Nerede Kalmıştık | Supporting actress | guest |
| 2008 | Benim Annem Bir Melek | Durusucan | guest |
| 2009 | Masumlar | Zeynep | plot cancelled |
| 2009–2012 | Hanımın Çiftliği | Güllü/Serap | Leading role |
| 2012 | Koyu Kırmızı | Ümit | Leading role |
| 2013–2014 | Merhamet | Narin Yılmaz | Leading role |
| 2023-2025 | Kızıl Goncalar | Meryem Tezel | Leading role |
| 2025-present | Kıskanmak | Seniha Paşazade | Leading role |

=== Film ===
| Year | Title | Role | Notes and Awards |
|---|---|---|---|
| 1999 | Kerem | Ayla | |
| 2000 | Fosforlu Cevriye | Ayten | |
| 2002 | Sır Çocukları | Zeynep | Ankara International Film Festival – Promising New Actress Award; Sadri Alışık Awards – Promising New Actress Award |
| 2004 | Büyü | Sedef | |
| 2004 | Anlat İstanbul | Şenay | |
| 2005 | Organize İşler | Umut Ocak | |
| 2006 | Beynelmilel | Gülendam | International Istanbul Film Festival – Best Actress |
| 2006 | Polis | Funda | |
| 2007 | Mr. Magorium's Wonder Emporium | Turkish dub | |
| 2007 | Bratz | Turkish dub | |
| 2007 | Mutluluk | Meryem | 44th Antalya Golden Orange Film Festival – Best Actress; 1st Yeşilçam Awards – Best Actress; Pune Uluslararası Film Festivali Best International Actress Award; Nominated—40th Sinema Yazarları Derneği Ödülleri – Best Actress |
| 2008 | Güneşin Oğlu | Şule | |
| 2008 | İncir Çekirdeği | Heda | |
| 2008 | O... Çocuklari | Dona | Nominated—2nd Yeşilçam Awards Best Actress Award |
| 2014 | Bu İşte Bir Yalnızlık Var | Ayşe | |
| 2026 | Yellow Letters | Derya | |

=== TV programs ===
- 2006: Yarışma Maratonu
- 2008: Koca Kafalar
- 2014–2015: Yetenek Sizsiniz Türkiye

TV Commercials

Axess:2006-2010

Bingo:2024- present

== Awards ==
| Year | Awards ceremony | Category | Production |
|---|---|---|---|
| 2002 | 14th Ankara International Film Festival | Promising New Actress | Sır Çocukları |
| 2003 | 8th Sadri Alışık Theatre and Cinema Actor Awards | Promising Actress | Sır Çocukları |
| 2005 | 1st White Pearl TV Awards | Best Actress | Valley of the Wolves |
| 2006 | 11th Sadri Alışık Theatre and Cinema Actor Awards | Best Musical/Comedy Actress of the Year in a Supporting Role | Kiralık Oyun |
| 2006 | 10th Afife Theatre Awards | Best Musical/Comedy Actress of the Year in a Supporting Role | Kiralık Oyun |
| 2007 | 26th International Istanbul Film Festival | Best Actress | Beynelmilel |
| 2007 | 2nd Kemal Sunal Culture and Art Awards | Best Motion Cinema Actress | |
| 2007 | 44th Antalya Golden Orange Film Festival | Best Actress | Mutluluk |
| 2008 | 1. Yeşilçam Ödülleri | Best Actress | Mutluluk |
| 2008 | 6. Pune Uluslararası Film Festivali | Best International Actress | Mutluluk |
| 2008 | 15th MGD Golden Lens Awards | Best Movie Actor/Actress of the Year | Mutluluk |
| 2010 | Ismail Cem television awards | Best Actress in a Drama Series | Hanımın Çiftliği |
| 2013 | 2. Bilkent Televizyon Ödülleri | Best Actress in a Drama Series | Merhamet |
| 2013 | Istanbul Aydin University 9th Communication Awards | Best Actress of the Year | Merhamet |
| 2024 | 9th Mimar Sinan GSL Mimar Sinan of the Year | Mimar Sinan of the Year | Kızıl Goncalar |
| 2024 | 24th Magazinci.com Best of the Year | Best TV Actress of the Year | Kızıl Goncalar |
