= Merhamet =

2013 Turkish TV series

- Genre: Drama
- Created by: Hande Altaylı
- Written by: Mahinur Ergun
- Directed by: M. Çağatay Tosun
- Starring: Özgü Namal; İbrahim Çelikkol; Burçin Terzioğlu
- Country of origin: Turkey
- Original language: Turkish
- No. of seasons: 2
- No. of episodes: 44

Production
- Producer: Gül Oğuz
- Running time: 95 minutes
- Production company: Most Production

Original release
- Network: Kanal D

Merhamet (English: Compassion) is a 2013 Turkish drama television series, adapted from Hande Altaylı's novel Kahperengi. It stars Özgü Namal and İbrahim Çelikkol. Set in 1996, it tells the story of Narin, who is a lawyer in Istanbul.

== Plot summary ==
Narin is a girl from a poor family with an abusive alcoholic father. Struggling against family pressure to quit school, she escapes to the big city. Through dedicated study she becomes a successful lawyer. She makes friends with a rich girl, Deniz, but faces difficulties when Firat, her first love, reappears in her life, engaged to Deniz's sister.

== Cast ==
- Özgü Namal - Narin Yılmaz Kazan
- İbrahim Çelikkol - Fırat Kazan
- Burçin Terzioğlu - Deniz
- Mustafa Üstündağ - Sermet Karayel
- Yasemin Allen - Irmak
- Ahmet Rifat Şungar - Atif
- Turgut Tunçalp
- Ayşegül Cengiz Akman
- Kosta Cortis
- Gonca Cilasun
- Aliye Uzunatağan

== Broadcast schedule ==
Season	Time (PST)	Sections	Season premiere		Season final		Channel
Season	Time (PST)	Sections	Date	The premiere audience (rating)	Date	Final viewers (rating)	Channel
1 season	Wednesday 20:00	19	13 February 2013	5.65 ^{[2]}	19 June 2013	3.65 ^{[3]}	Kanal D
2. season	Wednesday 20:00 / 22:00	25	11 September 2013	3.35 ^{[4]}	12 March 2014	4.48	Kanal D

== International publication ==
=== Representation in other countries ===
Country	The channel (s)	Release date	Name
Ethiopia	Kana TV	6 September 2023, April 2024	Mihret (ምህረት)
Iran	GEM TV	15 September 2013	Marhamat(مرحمت)
Croatia	Nova	26 November 2013	Milost
Pakistan	Urdu 1 Drama Central	16 April 2014, September 2020	Bad Naseeb (بد نصیب) Mercy
Bulgaria	bTV	5 November 2014	Милост (Mercy)
Serbia	Prva	23 February 2015	Milost
Romania	Acasă TV	28 October 2015	Iertare
Arab World	MBC4; Alarab	2015	AlRahma Modabla (الحلقات - الرحمة)
United States	Pasiones TV	3 May 2016	Mercy
Puerto Rico	WAPA-TV	9 May 2016	Merhamet
North Macedonia	Sitel TV	15 June 2016	Милост (Mercy)
Russia	Domashnee TV	25 May 2014	Милосердие
