= Demetri Goritsas =

American actor

- Born: Eugene, Oregon, U.S.
- Occupation: Actor
- Years active: 1994–present

Demetri Goritsas is an American actor. He is best known for his roles as Ethan in the Sky One television series Baddiel's Syndrome and Max Cain in the psychological thriller television series Modus.

He is also best known for his film roles as Parker in the 1998 film Saving Private Ryan (1998), Dr. Perkins in the 2019 film Radioactive (2019) and as Stuart Hutchinson in the 2015 film Everest (2015).

== Early life ==
Goritsas was born in Eugene, Oregon and spent part of his childhood in Prince George, British Columbia, Canada. He is of Greek ancestry.

== Career ==
In 1994, Goritsas made his film debut as a minor character in the drama film Little Women, featuring Winona Ryder, Christian Bale and Susan Sarandon. He also appeared as the character Slim Jim Man in the Slim Jim beef jerky commercials in the late 1990s.

He played alongside Jeremy Irons in Gallipoli in 2005 and appeared in the Torchwood series as the father of Jack Harkness. He has also dubbed video games like DRIV3R, Killzone 2, Driver: San Francisco and 007 Legends.

Goritsas appeared as Levene in the 2011 superhero film X-Men: First Class, featuring Hugh Jackman, James McAvoy, Michael Fassbender, Kevin Bacon and Nicholas Hoult. He appeared as Parker in the 1998 Steven Spielberg film Saving Private Ryan, featuring Tom Hanks, Tom Sizemore, Edward Burns and Matt Damon.

He appeared in films such as Sky Captain and the World of Tomorrow, A Mighty Heart, Darkest Hour, National Treasure: Book of Secrets, The Road to Guantanamo, The Catcher Was a Spy and Thunderbirds.

His television credits include The New Addams Family, Hawkeye, Highlander: The Series, Black Mirror and Episodes.

In 2020, he appeared as Bernie Peterson in the TNT original drama series The Alienist's second season, The Alienist: Angel of Darkness.

Goritsas played actor Roy Scheider in The Shark is Broken, Ian Shaw and Joseph Nixon's stage play about the making of the motion picture Jaws (1975). The Shark is Broken was staged at the Edinburgh Festival Fringe in August 2019, starring Ian Shaw as Robert Shaw, Liam Murray Scott as Richard Dreyfuss, and Duncan Henderson as Roy Scheider. Goritsas replaced Henderson in the role of Scheider for the successful run at London's West End from October 2021 to January 2022. The Shark is Broken transferred to the Royal Alexandra Theatre for a run from September–November 2022.

== Filmography ==
=== Film ===
| Year | Title | Role | Notes |
|---|---|---|---|
| 1994 | Little Women | Bhaer's Student | |
| 1997 | Excess Baggage | Surveillance Van Cop | |
| 1998 | Saving Private Ryan | Parker | |
| 1998 | House Arrest | Phil | Short film |
| 2001 | Spy Game | Billy Hyland | |
| 2002 | The Bourne Identity | Con Tech | |
| 2004 | Thunderbirds | News Anchor | |
| 2004 | Sky Captain and the World of Tomorrow | Radio Operator | |
| 2005 | Gallipoli | Narrator | Documentary film |
| 2006 | The Road to Guantanamo | Interrogator #7 | Documentary film |
| 2007 | A Mighty Heart | John Skelton | |
| 2007 | National Treasure: Book of Secrets | Asa Trenchard | |
| 2008 | Genova | Demetri | Titled as A Summer in Genova in the United States |
| 2009 | That Deadwood Feeling | Frank | Direct-to-video |
| 2010 | The Whistleblower | Kyle | |
| 2011 | X-Men: First Class | Levene | |
| 2012 | Acts of Godfrey | Brad Angel | |
| 2012 | Good Vibrations | Paul McNally | |
| 2013 | Austenland | Jimmy | |
| 2013 | Rush | American Journalist | |
| 2015 | Everest | Stuart Hutchinson | |
| 2016 | Angel of Decay | Roger | |
| 2016 | Snowden | CIA Supervisor | |
| 2016 | American Killing | Clark | |
| 2017 | Darkest Hour | Cabinet Secretary Bridges | |
| 2017 | Papillon | Jean-Pierre Castelneau | |
| 2017 | Borg vs. McEnroe | Bjorn Borg's Agent #1 | |
| 2018 | The Catcher Was a Spy | Clifton Fadiman | |
| 2019 | Rocketman | Carter | Credited as Demtrios John Goritsas |
| 2019 | Radioactive | Dr. Perkins | |

=== Television ===
| Year | Title | Role | Notes |
|---|---|---|---|
| 1995 | Hawkeye | Guard | Episode: "Amnesty" |
| 1995 | Highlander: The Series | Timon | Episode: "Song of the Executioner" |
| 1995 | The Annette Funicello Story | Jimmie Dodd | Television movie |
| 1996 | The Prisoner of Zenda, Inc. | Baxter | Television movie |
| 1996 | The Angel of Pennsylvania Avenue | Young Kansas Man | Television movie |
| 1997 | Smudge | Jan | Television movie |
| 1998 | Millennium | Agent Dixon | Episode: "Exegesis" |
| 1999 | Viper | Alan Keefe | Episode: "Of Course, It's a Miracle" |
| 1999 | The New Addams Family | Simon | Episode: "Lurch's Little Helper" |
| 2000 | Search | Vince | Unknown episodes |
| 2001 | Baddiel's Syndrome | Ethan | 14 episodes |
| 2002 | Breaking News | Spokesman | Episode: "Pilot" |
| 2005 | Numb3rs | FBI Tech #2 | Episode: "Identity Crisis" |
| 2006 | Cracker | Harry Peters | Television movie |
| 2006 | The Path to 9/11 | American Driver | Television movie |
| 2007 | Spooks | Frank Lowell | Episode: "The Courier" |
| 2008 | Torchwood | Jack's Father | Episode: "Adam" |
| 2009 | Clouds Over the Hill | Stonetong | Uncredited; Unknown episodes |
| 2010 | The Special Relationship | Strategist | Television movie |
| 2011 | Wicked Pirate City | Narrator | Television documentary movie |
| 2011-2012 | Episodes | Director | 9 episodes |
| 2011 | Wallaby Run | Seb (voice) | US version Television movie |
| 2012 | 6 passi nei giallo | Sebastian Brody | Episode: "Souvenirs" |
| 2012 | Twenty Twelve | Max Madeley | Episode: "The Rapper" |
| 2012-2013 | Nova | Narrator | 3 episodes Television documentary series |
| 2012 | Playhouse Presents | HR Haldeman | Episode: "Nixon's the One" |
| 2013 | Nixon's the One | HR Haldeman | 6 episodes |
| 2014 | A Poet in New York | Dr. Milton Feltenstein | Television movie |
| 2014-2015 | Railroad Alaska | Narrator | 18 episodes |
| 2015 | The Gamechangers | US Radio DJ (voice) | Television movie |
| 2016 | Black Mirror | Hansen | Episode: "Nosedive" |
| 2017 | Modus | Max Cain | 4 episodes |
| 2018 | Ransom | Stan Merker | Episode: "Promised Land" |
| 2020 | The Alienist: Angel of Darkness | Bernie Peterson | Recurring cast |

=== Video games ===
| Year | Title | Role | Notes |
|---|---|---|---|
| 2003 | Ghost Master | Additional Voices (voice) | |
| 2004 | Driver 3 | Bad Hand, Additional Voices (voice) | Credited as Demitri Goritsas |
| 2009 | Killzone 2 | Sgt. Thomas "Sev" Sevchenko (voice) | |
| 2010 | Enslaved: Odyssey to the West | Additional Voices (voice) | |
| 2010 | Apache: Air Assault | Additional Voices (voice) | |
| 2011 | Driver: San Francisco | John Tanner (voice) | Credited as Demitri Goritsas |
| 2012 | Inversion | Davis Russell (voice) | |
| 2012 | 007 Legends | Felix Leiter (voice) | |
| 2014 | The Crew | Additional Voices (voice) | |
| 2018 | Overkill's The Walking Dead | Survivors (voice) | |
| 2020 | The Signifier | Carl (voice) | |
| 2022 | Dying Light 2 Stay Human | Waltz (voice) | |
| 2022 | Triangle Strategy | Maxwell Trier (voice) | |
