= Gallipoli (2005 film) =

- Theatrical release poster
- Directed by: Tolga Örnek
- Written by: Tolga Örnek
- Produced by: Hamdi Döker; Burak Örnek
- Narrated by: Sam Neill; Zafer Ergin; Demetri Goritsas; Jeremy Irons
- Cinematography: Volker Tittel
- Edited by: Maria Zimmermann
- Music by: Demir Demirkan
- Distributed by: Cinema Epoch; Dogus Group
- Release date: March 18, 2005
- Running time: 118 minutes
- Country: Turkey
- Languages: English; Turkish

Gallipoli (Turkish title Gelibolu) is a 2005 Turkish documentary film written and directed by Tolga Örnek. It is a documentary about the 1915 Gallipoli campaign, narrated by both sides, the Turks on one side and the British soldiers and Anzacs (soldiers of the Australian and New Zealand Army Corps) on the other side.

== Synopsis ==
Through the use of surviving diaries, letters and photographs from both sides, the film shows the bravery and the suffering on both sides. The film also contains: interviews with international experts, location landscape, underwater and aerial photography, 3-D computer animations and re-enactments of trenches.

== Reception ==
=== Critical response ===
When the film was released in France, Variety magazine film critic, Lisa Nesselson, reviewed the film favorably, writing, "A thorough recounting of the carnage when Allied Forces attempted to take the Dardanelles Straits and the title peninsula in Turkey during WWI, Gallipoli serves up the paradoxes and idiocy of battle as expressed in letters and journals written by the men (on both sides) who were there...Clear, informative and frequently moving narration by Jeremy Irons and Sam Neill ties together six years of research by vet documaker Tolga Ornek. Drawing heavily on surviving correspondence, and skillfully illustrated with a blend of still photos, period footage and re-enactments, film keeps talking heads to a minimum. It brings to life long-dead adversaries who did their duty despite massive casualties from artillery, mines and the ravages of dysentery...Tech credits are top notch."

Australian film critic Louise Keller wrote, "A potent and magnificent documentary, Gallipoli impacts emotionally through its humanity and intensely personal stories. It has taken filmmaker Tolga Örnek six long years to research, write, produce and direct this outstanding film that documents the thoughts of soldiers who fought on all sides of this futile fiasco of a war. Although Örnek's script concisely recounts the circumstances and events that took place in the lead up to the nine month war, in which tens of thousands of soldiers lost their lives, it is not a story about who won or lost. Everyone lost in this shocking conflict, when young men not only fought against each other, but against extreme weather conditions, severe hardships like the ravages of disease, flies and lice."

=== Awards ===
For this film, Tolga Örnek has been awarded an honorary medal in the general division of the Order of Australia.

== Home media ==
A DVD in Region 1 was released on February 5, 2008 by Cinema Epoch.

== See also ==
- Gallipoli (1981), film starring Mel Gibson and directed by Peter Weir
