= Cemil Ağacıkoğlu =

Turkish photographer, writer, and director

- Born: 1959 (age 66–67); Istanbul
- Occupations: Photographer, film director, screenwriter

Cemil Ağacıkoğlu is a Turkish photographer, writer and film director. His credits include five feature films, 8 personal exhibitions, numerous international awards in photography and directing.

Born in 1959 in Istanbul, he came into directing after a successful career as a photographer. In 1990, he started as a photographer; in 1995 he won the title “Artist of FIAP” and in 1998 “Excellency of FIAP”. In 1997, he directed his first short film titled Cover.

His first feature, September (Eylül), was released in 2011 and was selected for the Montreal and BFI. His second feature film Apologies (Özür Dilerim) followed the next year.

In 2016, he released his third feature — The Field. The movie premiered at the Istanbul Film Festival and was screened at the 22nd Sarajevo Film Festival.

In 2021 Ağacıkoğlu released his fourth feature, The Cage. The movie tells a story of a retired police officer Hasan, who starts working in a motel in the alleys of Istanbul after losing his job. The movie was screened at several international film festivals and won a special jury prize at the 18th Adana Golden Boll Film Festival.

His fifth feature The Reeds was shown at the 2023 Toronto International Film Festival in the Centerpiece program.
