= Autumn (2008 film) =

- Original film poster
- Turkmen: Sonbahar
- Directed by: Özcan Alper
- Screenplay by: Özcan Alper
- Produced by: F. Serkan Acar; Kadir Sözen
- Starring: Onur Saylak; Megi Kobaladze; Serkan Keskin; Raife Yenigül
- Cinematography: Feza Caldiran
- Edited by: Thomas Balkenhol
- Distributed by: Filmpot
- Release date: December 19, 2008
- Running time: 95 minutes
- Country: Turkey
- Languages: Turkish, Georgian languages and the Homshetsi dialect

Autumn (Turkmen: Sonbahar) is a 2008 Turkish drama film directed by Özcan Alper, filmed trilingually in Turkish, Georgian and Homshetsi Armenian. It was filmed in Hopa, Çamlıhemşin, and Kemalpaşa. It profiles Yusuf, who as a 22-year-old university student was jailed for rioting, after his release from prison.

== Cast ==
- Onur Saylak as Yusuf
- Megi Kobaladze as Eka
- Serkan Keskin as Mikail
- Raife Yenigül as Gülefer
- Nino Lejava as Maria
- Sibel Öz as Asiye
- Cihan Camkerte as Onur
- Serhan Pirpir as Cihan
- Yasar Güven as Kogus Yasar

== Awards ==
- 2008: Won "Best Film" and "Jury Award" at the 15th Adana Altın Koza Film Festivali, Turkey
- 2008: Won NETPAC Award at the Avrasya International Film Festivali
- 2008: Won "C.I.C.A.E. Award" at Locarno International Film Festival
- 2008: Won "Silver Prometheus" at the Tbilisi International Film Festival
- 2009: Won "Best film" at the Ankara International Film Festival
- 2009: Won "Best director" at the Ankara International Film Festival
- 2009: Won "Best director" at the Sofia International Film Festival
- 2009: Won "FIPRESCI Prize" at the Yerevan International Film Festival
- 2009: Won "Jury Special Prize" for Best Film at the Yerevan International Film Festival
- 2009: Won "Best First Film" at the 2nd Yeşilçam Awards
- 2009: Nominated for "European Discovery of the Year" at the European Film Awards
