= Dilber Ay =

Turkish folk singer, songwriter, and TV presenter (1956–2019)

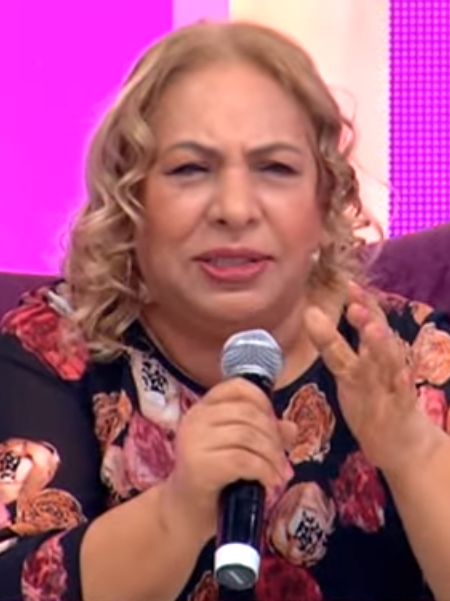
- Dilber Ay at İşte Benim Stilim, March 2016

Background information
- Birth name: Dilber Bağbuş
- Born: 1 January 1956; Pazarcık, Turkey
- Died: 29 April 2019 (aged 63); Ankara, Turkey
- Genres: Arabesque, Turkish folk
- Occupation(s): Musician, TV presenter
- Years active: 1974–2019

Dilber Ay (born Dilber Bağbuş; 1 January 1956 – 29 April 2019) was a Turkish folk singer, songwriter and TV presenter.

== Life ==
A member of the Kureyşan tribe, Ay was born on 1 January 1956 in Pazarcık to a family of Kurdish and Yörük descent. She remained in Kahramanmaraş until finishing the third grade of primary school. Her family then moved to Ankara and later settled in Bolu-Düzce. While studying in Düzce, at the age of 13 she was married to a much older man. Before marrying she had competed in a music contest broadcast on radio in Düzce, called Güzel Ses. During the contest, she sang a türkü, called Gönül Gel Seninle Muhabbet Edelim, and won the contest. After giving birth to two children, she separated from the man she was married to. In 1998, she married her second husband, İbrahim Karakaş, who was 15 years her junior. After making her breakthrough on radio, she released 24 albums. She was also sent to prison twice in Germany. Aside from her career as a musician, she presented Flash TV's Kadere Mahkûmlar program.

== Death ==
A resident of Düzce, Ay suffered from inflammation in her foot after cutting her toenail and died on 29 April 2019 at a hospital in Ankara. Her body was buried on 30 April 2019 at a cemetery in Düzce.

== Albums ==
- Dilberay (1974)
- 3 - Türküola (1975)
- Meyrik (1981)
- HazaL (1986)
- Barak Muhabbeti 1 (1987)
- Barak Muhabbeti 2 (1988)
- Postaci Emmi (1990)
- Oturak Havaları (1990)
- Yandim Eyvah (1993)
- Dağlar Oy (1993)
- Bırak Ona Da Dokunma (1994)
- Kisi Bitmez Daglarimin (1995)
- Barak Kızı (1996)
- Ölesen Gelin (1999)
- Sürdüler Beni - Sen Tasmisin Demirmi (2000)
- Bırakmadı Sevdan Beni - Yabancı (2001)
- Oturdum Mezar Taşına (2002)
- Maraşlı Gelin (2004)
- Hasrete Koştuk (2005)
- Alıp Başımı Gideyim (2005)
- Hacı Ağa (Sarı Sabahlık) (2007)
- Ellerin Olmuş (2008)
- Ötme Bülbül (2009)
- Be Zalim - İtfaiyeci (2010)
- Darıldım Sana (2011)
- Yasmı Varda Mahallede (2019)

== Filmography ==
- Beynelmilel (Arzum) - 2006
- Hayat Sana Güzel - 2014
- Mazlum Kuzey - 2014
- Figüran - 2015
- Yol Arkadaşım - 2017
- Yol Arkadaşım 2 - 2018

== Awards ==
- 14th Golden Boll Film Festival, "Best Supporting Actress" - Beynelmilel (2007)
