= Sırrı Süreyya Önder =

Turkish politician (1962–2025)

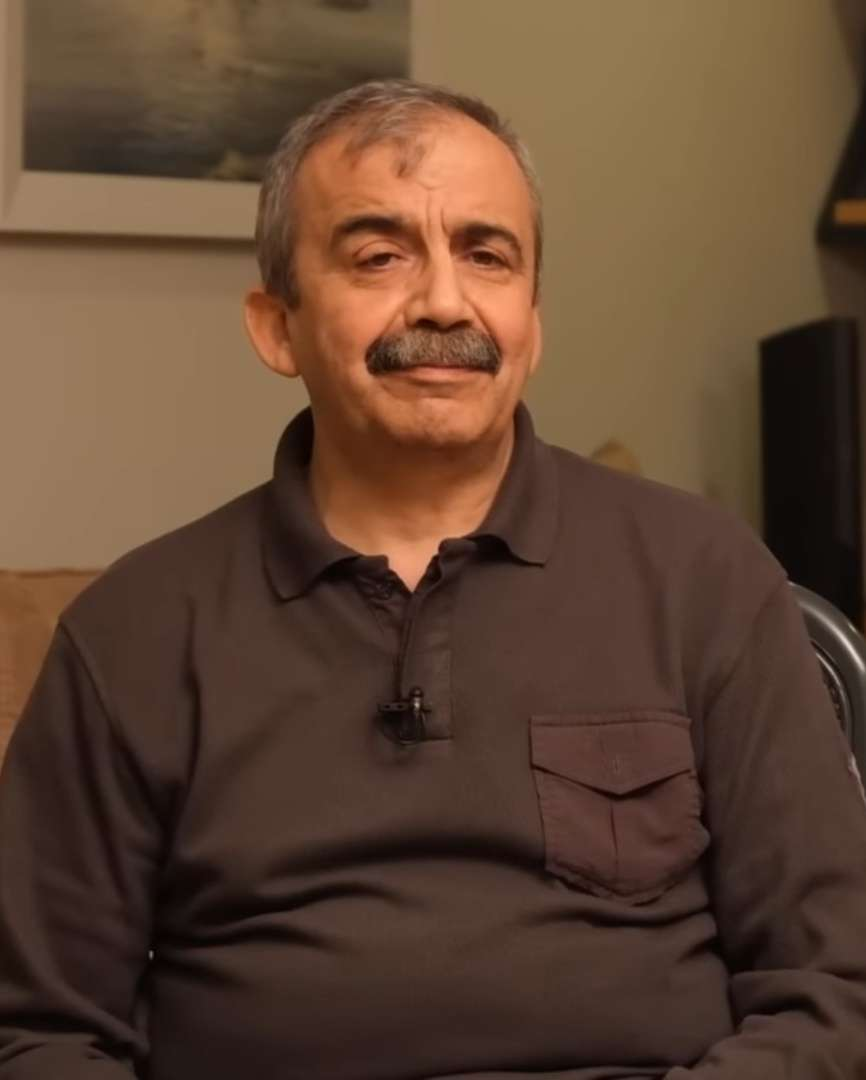
- Önder in 2023

Deputy Speaker of the Grand National Assembly
- In office 2 June 2023 – 3 May 2025
- Speaker: Numan Kurtulmuş
- Preceded by: Nimetullah Erdoğmuş
- Succeeded by: Pervin Buldan

Member of the Grand National Assembly
- In office 2 June 2023 – 3 May 2025
- Constituency: İstanbul (I) (2023)
- In office 28 June 2011 – 16 May 2018
- Constituency: İstanbul (II) (2011); Ankara (I) (June 2015, Nov 2015)

Personal details
- Born: 7 July 1962 Adıyaman, Turkey
- Died: 3 May 2025 (aged 62) Şişli, Istanbul, Turkey
- Resting place: Zincirlikuyu Cemetery, Istanbul
- Party: Peace and Democracy Party (2011–2014); People's Democratic Party (2014–2023); Peoples' Equality and Democracy Party (2023–2025)
- Spouse: Halide Tülay Demirsöz (m. 1991; div. 1991)
- Children: Ceren Önder Kandemir
- Occupation: Politician; film director; screenwriter; actor

Sırrı Süreyya Önder (7 July 1962 – 3 May 2025) was a Turkish film director, actor, screenwriter and columnist. Elected to parliament in 2011 as an independent backed by the Peace and Democracy Party (BDP), he later joined the party even though he was not of Kurdish descent. He competed in the 2014 municipal elections as the Istanbul mayoral candidate of the Peoples' Democratic Party (HDP), the sister party of the BDP, coming third with 412,875 votes (4.83%). In the general election of 7 June 2015 he was elected as MP for the 1st electoral district of Ankara Province.

Önder became a Deputy Speaker of the Grand National Assembly on 2 June 2023.

== Early years and education ==
Önder was born to a Turkoman family on 7 July 1962 in Adıyaman. His father, a barber, was the founder and leader of the provincial office of the Workers Party of Turkey (TİP) in the 1960s. His father belonged to the faction of Behice Boran. When Önder was eight years old, his father died from cirrhosis, after which the family moved to the maternal grandfather's house. To support his family, whilst still at school, Önder began working as an apprentice in a photograph shop, and this continued until he was in the tenth grade of high school.

At the age of sixteen Önder began to earn more money working for the National Malaria Eradication Program. He got involved in the trade union movement and this led to him being fired. Following a brief time in his own tire repair shop he made a living in the countryside by taking people's photographs for their identity documents.

In 1980 Önder enrolled in Ankara University to study political science. During the second term he joined a political student movement to protest the military junta that had overturned the government on 12 September 1980. He was arrested and sentenced to twelve years in prison on charges of membership in an illegal organization. He was incarcerated in overcrowded wards in prisons like Mamak, Ulucanlar and Haymana.

== Career ==
Önder's 2006 film The International was awarded the Best Picture Prize at the 2007 International Adana Golden Boll Film Festival, and was entered into the 29th Moscow International Film Festival.

In 2010 Önder began a columnist career at the newspaper BirGün. He then continued to write at the daily Radikal. Backed by the Peace and Democracy Party (BDP) in the 2011 parliamentary elections, he ran as an independent. Elected as a deputy for Istanbul, he then joined the BDP. After entering parliament, he quit his post at Radikal. He also wrote for Özgür Gündem.

Önder was involved in the 2013 Taksim Gezi Park protests and was reportedly hospitalised after being hit by a tear gas cartridge. He was part of a delegation of HDP politicians facilitating a dialogue between Öcalan and the Turkish Government which on 28 February 2015 led to the Dolmabahce Consensus. Önder was sentenced to 43 months in prison on 3 December 2018 for a speech he held during the Newroz festivities in 2013. On 6 December 2018 he went to prison in Kocaeli. On 4 October 2019, Önder was released, one day after the Constitutional Court ruled his freedom of expression had been violated. On 17 March 2021, the State Prosecutor to the Court of Cassation Bekir Şahin filed a lawsuit before the Constitutional Court demanding for Önder and 686 other HDP politicians a five-year ban to engage in politics together with a closure of the HDP due to their alleged organizational unity with the Kurdistan Workers' Party (PKK).

== Death ==
Önder died on 3 May 2025, at Florence Nightingale Hospital in Istanbul, where he was being treated for multiple organ failure which arose as a result of complications of a ruptured aortic artery that he had been hospitalised for on 15 April. He was 62. He is buried at Zincirlikuyu Cemetery.

== Filmography ==
2006

- The International (Turkish: Beynelmilel), director, screenwriter, film score and actor − Best Picture Award 2007 International Adana Golden Boll Film Festival
- Sis ve Gece, actor

2008

- O... Çocukları, screenwriter
- Kalpsiz Adam, advisor to screenwriter

2009

- Ada: Zombilerin Düğünü, (guest actor)
- Ejder Kapanı, actor

2010

- Mar, guest actor

2011

- Yeraltı, actor

2012

- F Tipi film, director

2013

- Düğün Dernek, actor

2024

- Bir Cumhuriyet Şarkısı, screenwriter

== See also ==
- Dolmabahce Agreement
