= Dot (film) =

- Directed by: Will Studd
- Produced by: Heather Wright
- Starring: Tamsin Egerton
- Music by: Ilan Eshkeri
- Production companies: Aardman Animations; Wieden+Kennedy; Nokia
- Release date: 2010
- Running time: 2 minutes
- Country: United Kingdom
- Language: English

Dot is a 2010 British animated short film directed by Will Studd for Aardman Animations. It is a spot for the Nokia N8.

== Production ==
University of California Berkeley professor Daniel Fletcher built a portable microscope which attaches to the Nokia N8 phone, for medical purposes. Nokia asked Aardman Animations to utilise both the microscope and the phone to create a short. The entire film is shot using a Nokia N8.

Marketing week explains: "To create 'Dot', Aardman's in-house production technology engineer, Lew Gardiner worked alongside the Physics Department at the University of Bristol to create their own CellScope production camera. Aardman used innovative Rapid Prototyping 3D printing technology that uses a computer-generated model of an object or character and then prints it in full 3D using a plastic resin material. The entire set was no more than a metre and a half long, all elements of which were used to help sell the scale of the project to the viewer."

A making-of video was also released.

== Plot ==
Marketing Week explains "The film features Dot, a tiny 9mm girl who wakes up in a magical, magnified world to discover her surroundings are caving in around her."

== Cast ==
- Tamsin Egerton as a girl

== Critical reception ==
Forbes said "It's a great film, but what really got my attention was the making-of-video. The amount of work that went into putting together 97 seconds of animation together is staggering –and I love all the nerdy details, like how they produced the Dot models on a 3D printer."

The executive producer of Dot and head of Aardman's commercials and branded content department, Heather Wright, commented: "The Nokia job is totally unique, one of those rare instances when the idea and execution are totally inter-dependent. It's very cool, challenging and very exciting for the studio."

The short is in the 2011 issue of Guinness Book of World Records as "the world's smallest stop motion character animation."

== Awards and nominations ==
Year	Nominee / work	Award	Result
2011	Dot	Webby Award for People's Voice Award in the Animation	Won
