= Başıbozuk (album) =

Studio album by Mor ve Ötesi
- Released: 24 November 2008
- Genre: Alternative rock
- Label: Rakun
- Producer: Tarkan Gözübüyük, Chris Sheldon

Mor ve Ötesi chronology
Büyük Düşler (2008)	Başıbozuk (2008)	Masumiyetin Ziyan Olmaz (2010)

Başıbozuk is the mix album of Turkish alternative rock band Mor ve Ötesi. It was released on 24 November 2008. The first three tracks are all candidate songs that Mor ve Ötesi had for the Eurovision Song Contest 2008 in Belgrade, Serbia when they were selected to represent Turkey; Of those, Deli was selected. The rest of the songs in the track are remixes and live performances.

== Track listing ==
1. Deli
2. İddia
3. Sonbahar
4. Kış Geliyor (Canlı)
5. Re (Canlı)
6. Bir Derdim Var (Canlı)
7. Parti - Flatliners Killa Remix
8. Kördüğüm - dEmian & Emre Remix
9. Ayıp Olmaz Mı? - Kaan Düzarat & Fuchs Rework
10. Küçük Sevgilim - Kaan Düzarat Remix
11. Darbe - Burak Güven & Serkan Hökenek Remix
12. Çocuklar ve Hayvanlar - DJ Kambo Remix
13. Deli - Luna Remix by Cihan Barış
14. İddia - Kerem Kabadayı & Serkan Hökenek Remix
15. (Hidden Track) Serseri (Canlı)
