= Kadir Sözen =

German-Turkish journalist (born 1964)

Kadir Sözen (born 1964 in Gaziantep, Turkey) is a German-Turkish journalist and filmmaker.

== Life and career ==
Sözen was born into a working-class family in Gaziantep, Turkey in 1964. The family emigrated to West Germany in 1969, and Sözen spent his childhood and youth in Mönchengladbach. While still at school, he began working as a freelance writer for Westdeutscher Rundfunk Köln (WDR), initially for radio. In 1986, due to his trade union and political activism, he received a scholarship from the Hans Böckler Foundation and began studying economics in Cologne, graduating with a diploma in 1990.

He continued his work as a freelance journalist and author for numerous broadcasting companies, including WDR, and began writing radio plays in addition to reports and radio features. In 1990, WDR filmed Sözen's first screenplay, Sehnsucht ('Longing').

In 1996, Sözen founded the production company Filmfabrik GmbH, which produced his own work and films by other filmmakers.

Sözen's first feature film, for which he wrote the screenplay and directed, was entitled Cold Nights, and received five of eight awards given out at the Adana Film Festival in October 1995. This was followed by Winter Flower (1997), God Is Dead (2003), and Of Happy Sheep (2014).

Sözen's two-part television film, Time of Wishes (2005), addressed the topic of migration, and was awarded the Adolf Grimme Prize. Takiye – Trail of Terror (2009), produced as a television film for ARD, also had a theatrical release in Turkey, where it sparked heated debate, leading to Sözen receiving multiple death threats. The film deals with Islamist investment funds that are embezzled by fundamentalist groups for political purposes. Yellow Days (2003), a German-Turkish co-production, was the first film shot in Kurdish in Turkey. Immediately after its premiere at the Antalya Film Festival, the film was banned by the Turkish Ministry of Culture on the grounds that it was pro-Kurdish. Herbst (2011), a German-Turkish co-production, was nominated for a European Film Award and awarded the CICAE Prix Art & Essai at the Locarno Film Festival.
