= Cars of the Revolution =

- Turkish: Devrim Arabaları
- Directed by: Tolga Örnek
- Written by: Tolga Örnek; Murat Disli
- Starring: Haluk Bilginer; Taner Birsel; Ali Düşenkalkar
- Music by: Demir Demirkan
- Release date: October 24, 2008
- Running time: 115 minutes
- Country: Turkey
- Language: Turkish

Cars of the Revolution (Turkish: Devrim Arabaları) is a 2008 Turkish drama film written and directed by Tolga Örnek. The film grossed $1.1 million after it was released to theatres on October 24, 2008.

== Plot ==
The film is based on the development of the Devrim, the first ever automobile designed and produced in Turkey in 1961.

== Cast ==
- Haluk Bilginer - Necip
- Taner Birsel - Gunduz
- Ali Düşenkalkar - Hayati
- Halit Ergenç - Ugur
- Altan Gördüm - Recep
- Serhat Tutumluer - Ismet
- Onur Ünsal - Necip
- Selçuk Yöntem - Latif
