= The Extremely Tragic Story of Celal Tan and His Family =

- Theatrical Poster
- Directed by: Onur Ünlü
- Written by: Onur Ünlü
- Produced by: Orkun Ünlü; Funda Alp
- Starring: Selçuk Yöntem; Bülent Emin Yarar; Ezgi Mola; Tansu Biçer; Güler Ökten; Türkü Turan; Köksal Engür; Cengiz Bozkurt; Alpay Şayhan
- Cinematography: Vedat Özdemir
- Edited by: Ahmet Can Çakırca
- Music by: Atilla Özdemiroğlu
- Production company: EfLAtun Film
- Distributed by: Medyavizyon, Filmpot
- Release date: September 2011
- Running time: 95 minutes
- Country: Turkey
- Language: Turkish

The Extremely Tragic Story of Celal Tan and His Family (Turkish: Celal Tan ve Ailesinin Aşırı Acıklı Hikayesi) is a 2011 Turkish comedy-drama film, written and directed by Onur Ünlü, starring Selçuk Yöntem as a widowed constitutional law professor, whose life takes a turn for the worse when he remarries to a university student, whose life he has saved. The film was awarded Best Film and Best Screenplay at the 18th International Adana Golden Boll Film Festival (September 17–25, 2011) where it premiered.

== Release and reception ==
=== Festival screenings ===
- World Premiere: 18th International Adana Golden Boll Film Festival (September 17–25, 2011)

=== Awards ===
- 18th International Adana Golden Boll Film Festival (September 17–25, 2011)
  - Best Film: (won)
  - Best Screenplay: Onur Ünlü (won)
  - Jury Award for Best Ensemble Cast Performance: (won)

== See also ==
- Turkish films of 2011
- 2011 in film
