= Three Monkeys (film) =

- Theatrical release poster
- Directed by: Nuri Bilge Ceylan
- Written by: Ebru Ceylan; Nuri Bilge Ceylan; Ercan Kesal
- Produced by: Zeynep Özbatur
- Starring: Yavuz Bingöl; Hatice Aslan; Ahmet Rıfat Şungar; Ercan Kesal
- Cinematography: Gökhan Tiryaki
- Edited by: Ayhan Ergürsel; Nuri Bilge Ceylan
- Distributed by: Zeitgeist Films (United States); Pyramide International (Europe)
- Release date: 2008
- Running time: 109 minutes
- Countries: Turkey; France; Italy
- Language: Turkish

Three Monkeys (Turkish: Üç Maymun) is a 2008 drama film co-written and directed by Nuri Bilge Ceylan. The film tells the story of a family of three and the attitude they adopt when faced with an accidental homicide, analyzing how this attitude distorts the human psyche.

== Plot ==
The film opens with a wealthy businessman, Servet, campaigning in the upcoming election, driving in his car on a wet night, alone, sleepy and struggling to keep his eyes open. Seconds later, he hits and kills a pedestrian in the middle of the road. Servet panics when another car with a couple inside stops briefly and drives away. Eyüp, Servet's normal driver, lives with his wife and son next to the railroad tracks in the poor coastal Yedikule neighborhood of Istanbul. He is woken in the night by his cell phone ringing. It is Servet, telling him to meet up immediately. When they meet, Servet, shivering in shock, explains the situation. If his role in the fatal accident becomes public, it would end his political career, so he asks Eyüp to take responsibility and serve the consequent prison sentence, which he thinks will be 6-12 months. In exchange Servet will give him a lump sum payment upon his release and pay his salary while he is in jail to his family so they can get by. Eyüp accepts the deal.

An unspecified time passes, summer arrives, and Eyüp's son, İsmail, fails his college entrance exam again. His mother, Hacer, who works as a kitchen assistant, starts worrying about him because of his dubious acquaintances and his injuries from fighting and tries to convince him to get a job. İsmail suggests driving children between home and school but, as they don't have funds for a car, İsmail asks his mother to seek an advance from the lump sum from Servet without consulting Eyüp. Hacer meets with Servet in his office after the election (which he lost), and requests the money. After Hacer leaves and is waiting for a bus at the stop, Servet persuades Hacer to accept a lift from him back to her home, which she very reluctantly accepts.

More unspecified time passes; İsmail finds out his mother is having an affair with Servet and confronts her but does not tell his father. After serving nine months in prison, Eyüp is released. He senses things are "a little peculiar" inside his home. Hacer is in love with Servet and wants to continue their affair but Servet refuses. That night, Hacer and Eyüp are invited to the police station and informed that Servet has been murdered. Police officers interrogate the two and Eyüp finds out that Hacer was cheating on him. He denies knowing anything about it. İsmail confesses to his mother that he murdered Servet. Eyüp calms down when he pays a visit to a mosque. Afterwards, Eyüp goes on to speak with a very poor man who works and sleeps inside a tea house in the neighborhood. Eyüp makes the same proposition to the poor man, Bayram, that Servet made to him: to claim the crime committed by his son.

== Cast ==
- Yavuz Bingöl as Eyüp
- Hatice Aslan as Hacer
- Ahmet Rıfat Şungar as İsmail
- Ercan Kesal as Servet
- Cafer Köse as Bayram
- Gürkan Aydın as the child

== Reception ==
=== Critical response ===
Three Monkeys has received positive reviews from critics. On Rotten Tomatoes, the film has a rating of 77%, based on 62 reviews, with an average rating of 6.9/10. The site's critical consensus reads, "Exploring the effects of a family's dealings with an underhanded politician, this crime drama avoids showing the violent outcomes of its characters' misdeeds, resulting in a lingeringly potent film." On Metacritic, the film has a score of 73 out of 100, based on 14 critics, indicating "generally favorable reviews".

=== Accolades ===
The film premiered in competition at the 2008 Cannes Film Festival on 16 May, where Ceylan won, ten days later, the Award for Best Director. It also won the Golden Anchor Competition Award at the Haifa International Film Festival. The film won best special effects award at the Golden Orange Film Festival, as well as the Siyad award at the International Eurasia Film Festival. At the Osian's Cinefan Film Festival the film won the Best Director Award, and at the "Manaki Brothers" Film Camera Festival it won Mosfilm Award and Special Mention. Ceylan received the award for Achievement in Directing at the Asia Pacific Screen Awards, where the film also received nominations for Best Feature Film and Achievement in Cinematography.

- 2008 Cannes Film Festival

Candidacy for Golden Palm in 61. Cannes Film Festival Cannes Best Director Award -Won-

- Oscar Awards

Last 9 for Best Foreign Language Film in 81st Academy Awards

- Other Awards

2. Yeşilçam Awards

- Best Movie -won-
- Best Director -won-
- Best Scenario -won-
- Best Actress -won-
- Best Actor
- Best Supporting Actor
- Best Director of Photography -won-
- Young Talent Special Award -won-

41. Siyad Awards

- Best Art Direction
- Best Fiction -won-
- Best Image Management
- Best Scenario
- Best Actor Performance
- Best Actress Performance -won-
- Best Supporting Actor -won-
- Best Director -won-
- Best Film

Osian's Cinefan Film Festival

- Best Director -won-

Haifa Film Festival

- Best Film (Golden Anchos) -won-

Asia Pasific Screen Awards

- Best Director -won-
- Best Film
- Best Image

"Manaki Brothers" Film Camera Festival

- Mosfilm Awards -won-
- Special Mention -won-

== See also ==
- List of submissions to the 81st Academy Awards for Best Foreign Language Film
- List of Turkish submissions for the Academy Award for Best Foreign Language Film

Awards
Preceded by Bliss	Yeşilçam Best Film Award; 2009	Succeeded by Breath
