= Özcan Alper =

Turkish film director and screenwriter (born 1975)

- Born: 1975 (age 50–51); Hopa, Artvin Province, Turkey
- Occupations: Screenwriter, film director
- Years active: 1999–present

Özcan Alper (born 1975) is a Turkish film director and screenwriter of Hemshin descent.

== Education and Career ==
He studied at Trabzon Lisesi. In 1992, he moved to Istanbul to study at Istanbul University Engineering Faculty in the Physics Department and then moved to Istanbul University Literature Faculty where he studied History of Sciences and graduated in 2003.

Since 1996, he was interested in films and took part in workshops organized by Mezopotamya Culture Center, the Nâzım Culture House (now renamed Nâzım Hikmet Culture Center). Starting 2000 started assisting in films under the supervision of film director Yeşim Ustaoğlu.

After being assistant director in the short Toprak, he filmed Momi as his first short film as main director. He also shot the documentary Tokai City'de Melankoli ve Rapsodi in Japan following it with yet another documentary entitled Bir Bilimadamıyla Zaman Enleminde Yolculuk.

In 2008, Alper released his first long feature Sonbahar (Autumn in Turkish) with multiple awards as a newcomer. He followed that with another critically acclaimed film Gelecek Uzun Sürer (English title Future Lasts Forever) that has also won important awards.

== Filmography ==
=== Director ===
- 2006: Saklı Yüzler (as assistant director)
- 2007: Sonbahar (director), English title Autumn
- 2011: Gelecek Uzun Sürer, English title Future Lasts Forever
- 2015: Rüzgarın Hatıraları, English title Memories Of The Wind

=== Screenwriter ===
- 2007: Sonbahar (director), English title Autumn
- 2010: Kars Öyküleri
- 2011: Gelecek Uzun Sürer, English title Future Lasts Forever
- 2015: Rüzgarın Hatıraları, English title Memories Of The Wind

=== Shorts ===
- 1999: Toprak as assistant director (short film)
- 2001: Momi, director (short film)

=== Documentaries ===
- Tokai City'de Melankoli ve Rapsodi
- Bir Bilimadamıyla Zaman Enleminde Yolculuk

=== Actor ===
- 2011: Fotoğraf

== Awards ==
For Sonbahar (Autumn)

- 2008: Won "Best Film" and "Jury Award" at the 15th Adana Altın Koza Film Festivali, Turkey
- 2008: Won NETPAC Award at the Avrasya International Film Festivali
- 2008: Won "C.I.C.A.E. Award" at Locarno International Film Festival
- 2008: Won "Silver Prometheus" at the Tbilisi International Film Festival
- 2009: Won "Best film" at the Ankara International Film Festival
- 2009: Won "Best director" at the Ankara International Film Festival
- 2009: Won "Best director" at the Sofia International Film Festival
- 2009: Won "FIPRESCI Prize" at the Yerevan International Film Festival
- 2009: Won "Jury Special Prize" for Best Film at the Yerevan International Film Festival
- 2009: Won "Best First Film" at the 2nd Yeşilçam Awards
- 2009: Nominated for "European Discovery of the Year" at the European Film Awards
- 2022: Received the Directors award from the Bogazici Film Festival, he dedicated the prize to Sebnem Korur Fincanci, the president of the Turkish Medical Association.

For Gelecek Uzun Sürer (Future Lasts Forever)

- At the Adana Altın Koza Film Festival
  - Best Director
  - Best Actor
  - Yılmaz Güney Award
- At the Malatya International Film Festival
  - Best Film
  - Best Director
  - Best Musik
- At Kerala International Film Festival
  - "FIPRESCI Best Film Award"
