= O... Çocukları =

2008 film

- Directed by: Murat Saraçoğlu
- Starring: Demet Akbağ; İpek Tuzcuoğlu
- Release date: 16 May 2008
- Running time: 2h
- Country: Turkey
- Language: Turkish

O... Çocukları is a 2008 Turkish drama film directed by Murat Saraçoğlu. It was the 8th most successful film at the Turkish box office in 2008.

== Cast ==
- Demet Akbağ - Mehtap Anne
- İpek Tuzcuoğlu - Hatice
- Özgü Namal - Dona
- Sarp Apak - Saffet
- Altan Erkekli - Lokman
