= Hatice Aslan =

Turkish actress (born 1962)

- Born: 20 February 1962 (age 64); Sivas, Turkey
- Occupation: Actress
- Years active: 1992–present
- Spouses: Hakkı Ergök (divorced) Renan Kaleli (m. 1992; div. 2000)
- Children: 1
- Awards: 2011 Best Actress - Golden Boll Award

Hatice Aslan (born 20 February 1962) is a Turkish actress who starred in Nuri Bilge Ceylan's 2008 film Üç Maymun (The Three Monkeys), for which Ceylan won the best director award at the 2008 Cannes Film Festival. Aslan was seen as a strong contender for the best actress award at the festival.

She is best known for hit series "En Son Babalar Duyar" and "Ferhunde Hanımlar". Aslan shared the Adana Golden Boll International Film Festival's Best Actress Award in 2011 together with Görkem Yeltan for her role in Vücut.

== Filmography ==
=== Television ===
TV series
Year	Title	Role	Notes
1992	Elif'in Rüyaları	-	Supporting role
1993	Deli Balta	Rosa	Supporting role
1993–1999	Ferhunde Hanımlar	Nejla	Supporting role
2002	En Son Babalar Duyar	Hülya	Leading role
2002	Kınalı Kar	Leyla	Supporting role
2003	Hürrem Sultan	Mahidevran Sultan	Supporting role
2003	A. G. A		Supporting role
2003	Hırçın Menekşe	Pelin	Supporting role
2007	Güzel Günler	Feride	Supporting role
2008	Düğün Şarkıcısı	Şükran	Supporting role
2009	Masumlar	Nejla	Supporting role
2010	Samanyolu	Belkıs	Leading role
2010–2013	Lale Devri	Zümrüt Taşkıran	Leading role
2014	Bugünün Saraylısı	Türkan	Supporting role
2015	Ayrılsak da Beraberiz	Mehveş	Leading role
2015	Mayıs Kraliçesi	Asu Aytekin	Leading role
2018	Adı: Zehra	Şule	Leading role
2018	Bir Deli Rüzgar	Melike Candan	Leading role
2019	Kuzgun	Meryem	Leading role
2020–2021	Zümrüdüanka	Ülfet	Leading role
2020	Alef	Semiha	Supporting role
2021	Cam Tavanlar	Süreyya	Leading role
2021	Hamlet	Nazan	Supporting role
2021–2022	Annemizi Saklarken	Benan Demir	Leading role
2023	Ya Çok Seversen	Füsun Arcalı	Supporting role
2023	Adım Farah	Rahşan	Supporting role
2024–2025	Bahar	Nevra Yavuzoğlu	Supporting role
2026	Tuzlu Kahve	Nermin Destan	Supporting role

=== Film ===
Cinema and TV movies
Year	Title	Role	Notes
2007	Bayrampaşa: Ben Fazla Kalmayacağım	Hatice	Supporting role
2008	Üç Maymun	Hacer	Leading role
2009	Kıskanmak	Feriha	Supporting role
2009	Şark Oyunları	Işıl's mother	Supporting role
2012	Vücut	Leyla	Leading role
2014	9on	Nermin	Supporting role
2021	Anatolian Leopard (Anadolu Leoparı)	Tezer	Leading role
2022	Burning Days (Kurak Günler)	Emre's mother	Supporting role
2022	Private Lesson	Ülker	Supporting role
2023	Annesinin Kuzusu		Leading role
2024	Derûn		
2025	Yan Yana	Lale	Supporting role
2025	Aşk ve Yemek	Nisan	Supporting role

Awards
Preceded by Nergis Öztürk and Sezin Akbaşoğulları	Golden Boll Award for Best Actress; 2011 with Görkem Yeltan for Vücut	Succeeded by Nilay Erdönmez
