= Onur Saylak =

Turkish actor (born 1977)

Arif Onur Saylak
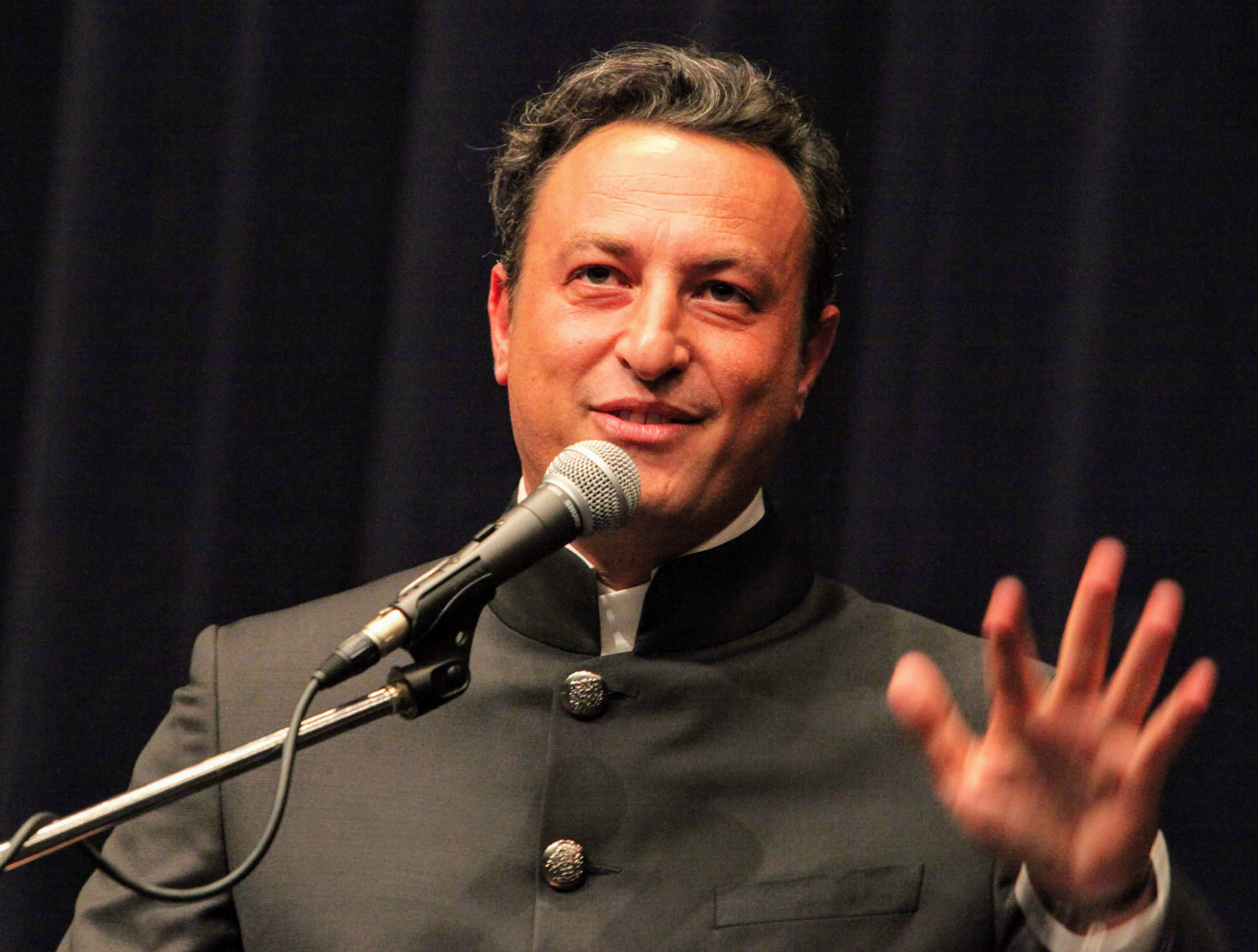
- Saylak in 2017
- Born: Arif Onur Saylak; 12 May 1977 (age 48); Ankara, Turkey
- Occupations: Actor, filmmaker, director
- Years active: 2000–present
- Spouse: Tuba Büyüküstün (m. 2011; div. 2017)
- Partner: Gözde Yılmaz
- Children: 3
- Awards: 2nd Yeşilçam Awards for Best Actor; 41st SİYAD Awards for Best Actor

Arif Onur Saylak (born 12 May 1977) is a Turkish actor, filmmaker and director. He was married for six years to Tuba Büyüküstün, with whom he has twin daughters.

== Personal life ==
On 28 July 2011, Saylak married the Turkish actress Tuba Büyüküstün in Paris, France. In January 2012, his wife gave birth to twin girls, Maya and Toprak. The couple got divorced on 5 June 2017. From his subsequent relationship with the manager Gözde Yılmaz, he has a son who was born in December 2020.

== Filmography ==
=== As director/scriptwriter ===
Projects
Year	Title	Notes
2015	Orman	Director and scriptwriter
2017	Daha	Director and scriptwriter
2018 / 2023–	Şahsiyet	Director
2022	Uysallar	Director
2023	Boğa Boğa	Director

=== As actor ===
Television
Year	Title	Role	Notes
2000	Bizim Evin Halleri		
2003	Yuvadan Bir Kuş Uçtu		
2004	Aşk Buraya Uğramıyor		
2005	Ne Seninle Ne Sensiz	Batanay	Leading role
2006	Yabancı Damat	İhsan	season 3, guest appearance
2006	Hisarbuselik	Çetin	Leading role
2006	Kod Adı	Erkan Karaca	Supporting role
2007	Kod Adı: Kaos	Erkan Karaca	Supporting role
2008–2009	Asi	Ziya	Supporting role
2009	Nefes	Ateş	Leading role
2010–2011	Gönülçelen	Levent	Leading role
2011	Sensiz Olmaz	Aydın	Leading role
2012	Ağır Roman Yeni Dünya	Janti Metin	Leading role
2014	Hayat Ağacı	Cengiz Kaya	Leading role
2015	Hatırla Gönül	Tekin	Leading role
2016–2018	Vatanım Sensin	Tevfik/Yanık Efe	Leading role
2018–2019	Çarpışma	Veli Cevher	Leading role
2019	Çukur	Veli Cevher	Guest appearance
2019	Kuzgun	Ferman Koruoğlu	season 2, supporting role
2020	Babil	Egemen Kıvılcım	season 2, leading role
2024	Gaddar	Müdür	
2024	Deha	Sofi / Ali Haydar	
Film
Year	Title	Role	Notes
2007	Sonbahar	Yusuf	
2008	Güz Sancısı	man blowing feathers	
2009	Denizden Gelen	Halil	
2013	Mavi Dalga	Fırat	
2015	Rüzgarın Hatıraları	Aram	
