= Görkem Yeltan =

Turkish actress (born 1977)

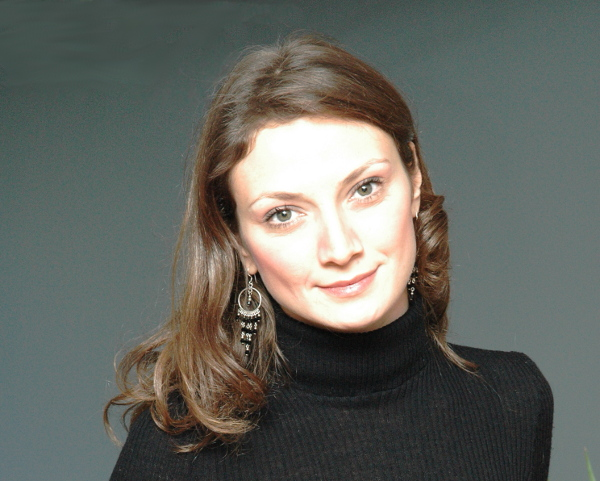
- Born: 17 January 1977 (age 49); Nazilli, Turkey
- Occupation: Actress
- Years active: 1993–present

Görkem Yeltan (born 17 January 1977) is a Turkish actress, writer and director. She appeared in more than fifteen films since 1993. She studied at theatre department and literature department from Istanbul University. She was cast in many popular series like Yılan Hikayesi, Davetsiz Misafir, En İyi Arkadaşım, Süper Baba, Kara Melek, Ruhsar.

== Filmography ==
=== Films ===
- 2006: Miras
- 2006: Pulpa
- 2007: Sıfır Dediğimde
- 2008: Gölge
- 2008: Güneşin Oğlu
- 2009: Uzak İhtimal
- 2010: Unutma Beni İstanbul
- 2011: Eylül
- 2011: Kayıp Aranıyor
- 2014: Seni Seviyorum Adamım
- 2015: Yemekteydik ve Karar Verdim
- 2016: Bünyamin
- 2017: Durak
- 2018: Dört Köşeli Üçgen
- 2019: Kader Postası
- 2019: Dilsiz
- 2021: Kafes

=== Short film ===
- 2017: Gazi
- 2011: Bolis

=== Series ===
- 2018: Alija
- 2016: Hayat Mucizelere Gebe
- 2011: Böyle Bitmesin
- 2011: Küçük Hanımefendi
- 2009: Ey Aşk Nerdesin
- 2008: Aşk Yakar
- 2007: Şölen
- 2005: Davetsiz Misafir
- 2004: En İyi Arkadaşım
- 2004: Sil Baştan
- 2002: Biz Size Aşık Olduk
- 2002: Canım Kocacığım
- 2000: İnsanlık Hali
- 1999: Yılan Hikayesi
- 1999: Yüzleşme
- 1997: Komşu Komşu
- 1998: Ruhsar
- 1997: Kara Melek
- 1994: Foksi Show
- 1993: Süper Baba
- 1991: İnsanlık Hali

== Theatre ==
- 1999: Bir Cinayetin Söylencesi : Melih Cevdet Anday - Bakırköy Belediye Tiyatrosu
- 2010: Bomba (oyun) : Berkun Oya - Krek

== Screenwriter ==
- Once Upon a Time Yesilçam, Abdurrahman Keskiner (2022)
- Bağcık (2018)
- Dört Köşeli Üçgen (2018)
- Yemekteydik ve Karar Verdim (2016)
- Domates Orucu Bozmaz (2009)
- Uzak Ihtimal (2009)

== Other works ==
=== Kid books ===
- 2002: Kırmızı'nın Mektupları
- 2004: Hımbıl Beyaz
- 2004: Zebra Zaza
- 2005: Define Bahçesi
- 2005: Kaplumbağa ile Eşek
- 2006: Kelebek Kız
- 2007: Yapraklı Pelerin
- 2008: Boyalı Hamsi ve Süs Balığı
- 2011: Haliç'ten Bulutlar Geçerken
- 2012: Buyaka Çocuk Evi 1: Tinimini Tehlikede
- 2012: Buyaka Çocuk Evi 2: Pamuklu Bir Macera
- 2012: Buyaka Çocuk Evi 3: Endişeli Bulutlar Arasında
- 2012: Korkusuz Meles
- 2014: Bez Ayakkabılar
- 2014: Çok Şiir Bir Salıncak

=== Kid albums ===
- 2003 Kırmızı’nın Günlüğü
- 2004 Solucan Hımbıl Beyaz – Zebra Zaza
- 2006 Define Bahçesi

== Award ==
- 2009: 16. Uluslararası Adana Altın Koza Film Festivali - Best Actress - Uzak İhtimal
- 2009: 28. Uluslararası İstanbul Film Festivali - Best Screenwriter - Uzak İhtimal
- 2011: 18. Uluslararası Adana Altın Koza Film Festivali - Best Actress - "Eylül"
