= Tolga Örnek =

Turkish film director, writer and producer

Tolga Örnek (born 25 August 1972) is a Turkish film director, writer and producer who, in recognition of his 2005 documentary, Gallipoli, was awarded an honorary medal in the general division of the Order of Australia.

== Education and Career ==
He studied at Robert College and later at Istanbul Technical University. He received his MS in engineering from the University of Florida and his MA in Film and Video Production from American University. Since his Gallipoli documentary, he's moved into feature films by producing, directing and writing four feature films. He is also the director of Losers' Club, which is one of the highest grossing Turkish films ever produced. His film, Labyrinth, an action thriller, has received wide international acclaim and has been distributed worldwide.

== Filmography ==
- Atatürk (1998)
- Kuruluştan Kurtuluşa Fenerbahçe (1999)
- Topkapı Sarayı (1999)
- Tanrıların Tahtı Nemrut Dağı (2000)
- Çeliğin Kalbi Ereğli (2001)
- Gallipoli (Gelibolu) (2005)
- Hittites (2003)
- Devrim Arabaları (2008)
- Losers' Club (2011)
- Labyrinth (2011)
- Your Story (2013)
- Sen Benim HerSeyimsin (2016)
- Miracle Mirrors (2022)
