= 44th SİYAD Awards =

- Date: January 16, 2012
- Location: Cemal Resit Rey Concert Hall
- Country: Turkey
- Presented by: Turkish Film Critics Association (SİYAD)
- Website: siyad.org

Television/radio coverage
- Network: Turkmax

The 44th SİYAD Awards (Turkish: 44. SİYAD Ödülleri), presented by the Turkish Film Critics Association (SİYAD), honored the best Turkish films of 2011 and took place on January 16, 2012, at the Cemal Resit Rey Concert Hall in Istanbul, Turkey.

== Awards and nominations ==
=== Best Film ===
- Winner: Once Upon a Time in Anatolia (Turkish: Bir Zamanlar Anadolu'da) produced by Zeynep Özbatur Atakan
  - Future Lasts Forever (Turkish: Gelecek Uzun Sürer) produced by Soner Alper and Ersin Celik
  - Shadows and Faces (Turkish: Gölgeler ve Suretler) produced by Önder Çakar, Sevil Demirci and Seren Yüce
  - Press produced by Sedat Yılmaz
  - Hair (Turkish: Saç) produced by Tayfun Pirselimoğlu, Veysel İpek and Rena Vougioukalou

=== Best Director ===
- Winner: Nuri Bilge Ceylan for Once Upon a Time in Anatolia (Turkish: Bir Zamanlar Anadolu'da)
  - Çağan Irmak for My Grandfather's People (Turkish: Dedemin İnsanları)
  - Tayfun Pirselimoğlu for Hair (Turkish: Saç)
  - Ümit Ünal for Pomegranate (Turkish: Nar)
  - Derviş Zaim for Shadows and Faces (Turkish: Gölgeler ve Suretler)

=== Mahmut Tali Award for Best Script ===
- Winner: Ebru Ceylan, Nuri Bilge Ceylan and Ercan Kesal for Once Upon a Time in Anatolia (Turkish: Bir Zamanlar Anadolu'da)
  - Ümit Ünal for Pomegranate (Turkish: Nar)
  - Tayfun Pirselimoğlu for Hair (Turkish: Saç)
  - Sedat Yılmaz for Press
  - Derviş Zaim for Shadows and Faces (Turkish: Gölgeler ve Suretler)

=== Cahide Sonku Award for Best Actress ===
- Winner: Nazan Kesal for Hair (Turkish: Saç)
  - Demet Akbağ for Eyyvah Eyvah 2
  - Nesrin Cavadzade for Fire! (Turkish: Yangın Var)
  - Hazar Ergüçlü for Shadows and Faces (Turkish: Gölgeler ve Suretler)
  - Nergis Öztürk for Merry-Go-Round (Turkish: Atlıkarınca)

=== Best Actor ===
- Winner: Ayberk Pekcan for Hair (Turkish: Saç)
  - Taner Birsel for Once Upon a Time in Anatolia (Turkish: Bir Zamanlar Anadolu'da)
  - Serkan Ercan for Toll Booth (Turkish: Gişe Memuru)
  - Osman Sonant for Fire! (Turkish: Yangın Var)
  - Muhammet Uzuner for Once Upon a Time in Anatolia (Turkish: Bir Zamanlar Anadolu'da)

=== Best Supporting Actress ===
- Winner: Asiye Dinçsoy for Press
  - Popi Avraam for Shadows and Faces (Turkish: Gölgeler ve Suretler)
  - Gökçe Bahadır for My Grandfather's People (Turkish: Dedemin İnsanları)
  - İdil Fırat for Pomegranate (Turkish: Nar)
  - Nergis Öztürk for Toll Booth (Turkish: Gişe Memuru)

=== Best Supporting Actor ===
- Winner: Ercan Kesal for Once Upon a Time in Anatolia (Turkish: Bir Zamanlar Anadolu'da)
  - Rıza Akın for Hair (Turkish: Saç)
  - Rıza Kocaoğlu for Losers' Club (Turkish: Kaybedenler Kulübü)
  - Fırat Tanış for Once Upon a Time in Anatolia (Turkish: Bir Zamanlar Anadolu'da)
  - Ahmet Mümtaz Taylan for Once Upon a Time in Anatolia (Turkish: Bir Zamanlar Anadolu'da)

=== Best Cinematogropher ===
- Winner: Gökhan Tiryaki for Once Upon a Time in Anatolia (Turkish: Bir Zamanlar Anadolu'da)
  - Feza Çaldıran for Future Lasts Forever (Turkish: Gelecek Uzun Sürer)
  - Emre Erkmen for Shadows and Faces (Turkish: Gölgeler ve Suretler)
  - Ercan Özkan for Hair (Turkish: Saç)
  - Mehmet Zengin for Zephyr (Turkish: Zefir)

=== Best Music ===
- Winner: Mircan Kaia for White as Snow (Turkish: Kar Beyaz)
  - Mustafa Biber for Future Lasts Forever (Turkish: Gelecek Uzun Sürer)
  - Selim Demirdelen for Pomegranate (Turkish: Nar)
  - Marios Takoushis for Shadows and Faces (Turkish: Gölgeler ve Suretler)
  - Cavit Ergün, Erdem Tarabuş and Can Göksu for Losers' Club (Turkish: Kaybedenler Kulübü)

=== Best Editor ===
- Winner: Bora Gökşingöl and Nuri Bilge Ceylan for Once Upon a Time in Anatolia (Turkish: Bir Zamanlar Anadolu'da)
  - Haluk Arus for Losers' Club (Turkish: Kaybedenler Kulübü)
  - Çiçek Kahraman, Evren Luş and Tolga Karaçelik for Toll Booth (Turkish: Gişe Memuru)
  - Erdinç Özyurt for Hair (Turkish: Saç)
  - Aylin Tinel for Shadows and Faces (Turkish: Gölgeler ve Suretler)

=== Best Art Director ===
- Winner: Haluk Ünlü for My Grandfather's People (Turkish: Dedemin İnsanları)
  - Dilek Yapkuöz Ayatuna for Once Upon a Time in Anatolia (Turkish: Bir Zamanlar Anadolu'da)
  - Nevin Doğan for Press
  - Elif Taşçıoğlu for Shadows and Faces (Turkish: Gölgeler ve Suretler)
  - Natali Yeres for Hair (Turkish: Saç)

=== Best Documentary Film ===
- Winner: Ekümenopolis: Ucu Olmayan Şehir directed by İmre Azem
  - Anadolu'nun Son Göçerleri: Sarıkeçililer directed by Yüksel Aksu
  - An directed by Nazlı Bayram
  - Bedensiz Ruhlar directed by Sabite Kaya
  - Bir Avuç Cesur İnsan directed by Rüya Köksal
  - Diren-İş directed by Burak Koçak
  - Ofsayt directed by Reyan Tuvi
  - Ölücanlar directed by Murat Özçelik

=== Best Short Film ===
- Winner: Birgünbirgünbir...Evedegelmişkimseyok directed by Berrak Çolak
  - Kırmızı Alarm directed by Emre Akay
  - Pera Berbangê directed by Arin İnan Arslan
  - Fazla Mesai directed by Gürcan Keltek
  - Nolya directed by Cem Öztüfekçi

=== Honorary Awards ===
- Erden Kıral (filmmaker)
- Osman Şahin (screenwriter)
- Perihan Savaş (actress)

== See also ==
- 5th Yeşilçam Awards
- Turkish films of 2011
- 2011 in film
- Best 10 Turkish Films selected by SIYAD
