= Kesal =

Kesal is a Turkish surname. Notable people with the surname include:

- Ercan Kesal (born 1959), Turkish actor, director, writer and physician
- Nazan Kesal (born 1969), Turkish actress
