= 35th Moscow International Film Festival =

Film festival

- Opening film: World War Z
- Location: Moscow, Russia
- Founded: 1959
- Awards: Golden George
- Festival date: 20–29 June 2013
- Website: Website

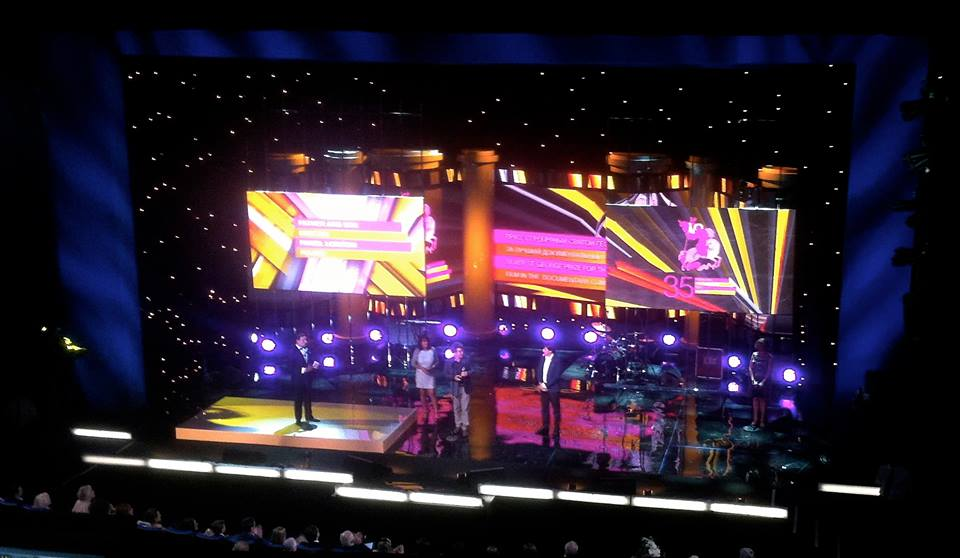
Award presentation stage during the 35th Moscow International Film Festival in 2013.

The 35th Moscow International Film Festival took place between 20 and 29 June 2013. World War Z was selected as the opening film. The Golden George was awarded to the Turkish film Particle.

== Films in competition ==
The following films were selected for the main competition:

English title	Original title	Director(s)	Production country
Matterhorn	Matterhorn	Diederik Ebbinge	Netherlands
Traffic Department	Drogówka	Wojciech Smarzowski	Poland
Spaghetti Story	Spaghetti Story	Ciro de Caro	Italy
The Role	Rol	Konstantin Lopushansky	Russia
The Kids from the Port	Los Chicos Del Puerto	Alberto Morais	Spain
Particle	Zerre	Erdem Tepegöz	Turkey
Rosie	Rosie	Marcel Gisler	Switzerland
The Ravine of Goodbye	Sayonara keikoku	Tatsushi Ōmori	Japan
Disorder	Koma	Archil Kavtaradze	Georgia
Slide	Skolzheniye	Anton Rozenberg	Russia
Back in Crime	L'Autre Vie de Richard Kemp	Germinal Alvarez	France
Mamaroš	Mamaroš	Momčilo Mrdaković	Serbia, Germany, France, Hungary
Lebanon Emotion	Le-ba-non kam-jeong	Young-heun Jung	South Korea
Judas	Iuda	Andrey Bogatyryov	Russia
Memories They Told Me	A Memória que me Contam	Lúcia Murat	Brazil
Delight	Delight	Gareth Jones	United Kingdom

== Jury ==
Competition

- Mohsen Makhmalbaf - Iranian film director
- Ursula Meier - Swiss film director
- Sergei Garmash - Russian actor
- Zurab Kipshidze - Georgian actor
- Kim Dong-ho - Korean actor

== Awards ==
Competition

- Golden George: Particle by Erdem Tepegöz
- Special Jury Prize: The Ravine of Goodbye by Tatsushi Ōmori
- Silver George for Best Director: Young-heun Jung for Lebanon Emotion
- Silver George for Best Actor: Aleksey Shevchenkov for Judas
- Silver George for Best Actress: Jale Arıkan for Particle
- Special Prize for An Outstanding Contribution To The World Cinema: Costa-Gavras
- Stanislavsky Award: Kseniya Rappoport
