= Electroboy =

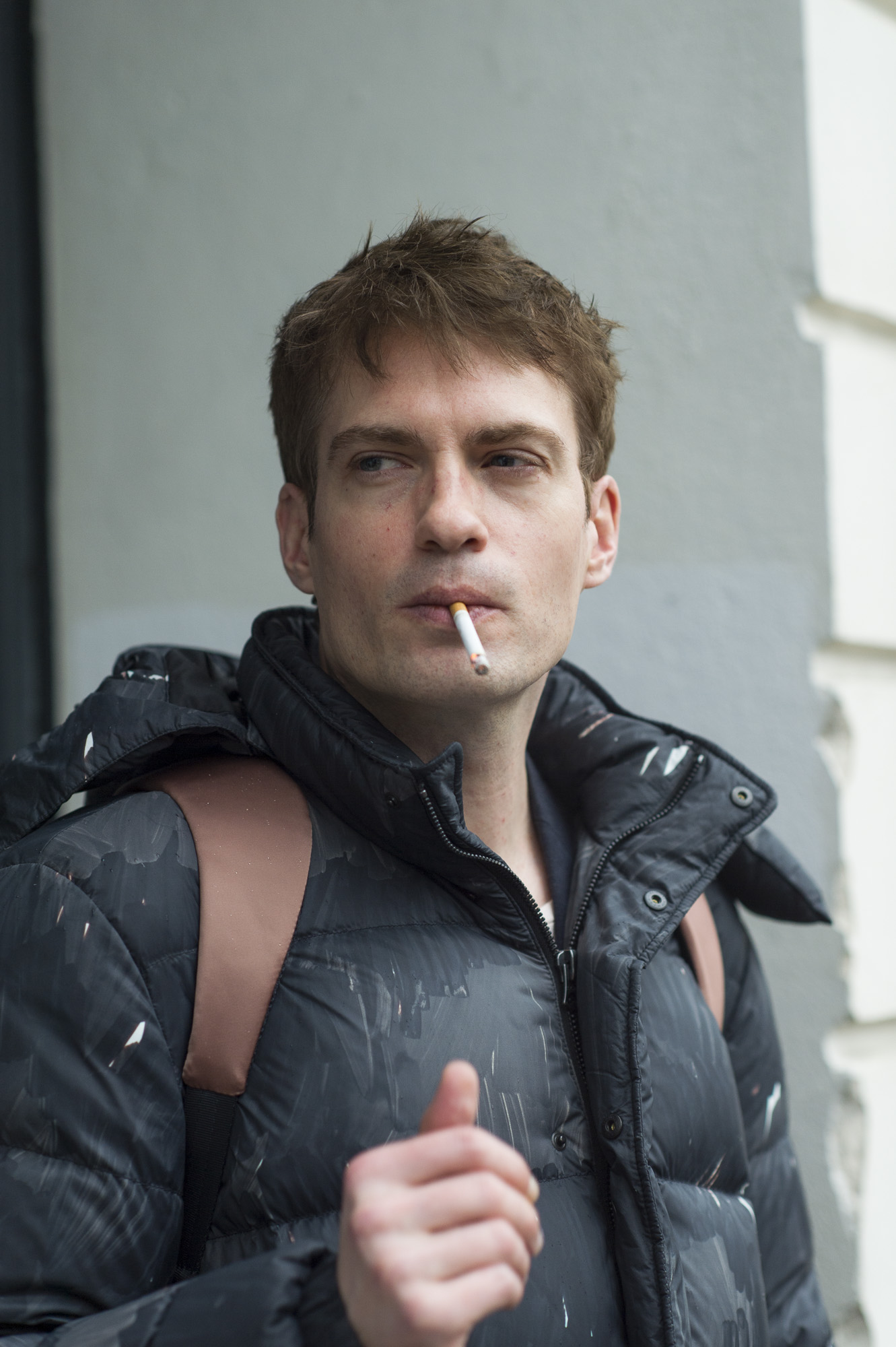
- Burkhardt in 2015
- Born: Florian Burkhardt
- Occupation: Model, Graphic designer, Writer, Composer

Florian Burkhardt, better known as Electroboy, is a Swiss model, author, conceptioner, graphic designer, electronic musician and music producer. He lives in Berlin. Electroboy produces electronic trash-pop and electroclash with simple, cheeky content based on a dadaistic philosophy. He also creates series of vector graphics to call up for more consumer responsibility and to promote a vegan lifestyle.

== Biography ==
Burkhardt dreamt of becoming a professional snowboarder and was sponsored by companies such as Burton Snowboards and Vans. After his diploma in Pedagogy he decided to move to the mountains. This experience convinced him to found the first Swiss snowboard magazine. After selling his magazine, Burkhardt moved in 1996 to Los Angeles to commence an acting career. He signed a contract with a Talent Agency and was coached by Ivana Chubbuck and Robert Easton. But thanks to a feature in a film magazine he got his first modelling job. More modelling work awaited him in Milan, New York, Tokyo, Paris and London. He became Newcomer of the Year, working for labels such as Prada, Gucci, Dolce & Gabbana and Moschino. He had contracts with agencies such as Wilhelmina Models, Boss Model Management and Why Not Model Agency and was booked by photographers such as David LaChapelle and Albert Watson. At the peak of his modelling career he went back to Zurich. Burkhardt studied Graphic design and tried one job after another: first as an advertiser in an internet agency, then he started an own film production company named emotionstimulator to bring as one of the first videos into the internet. After these projects he started to suffer from a generalized anxiety and had to stay 3 months at the University Hospital of Psychiatry of Zurich. After that he wrote the book Stop.

In 2004 he started organizing parties and festivals in Zurich under his pseudonym: Electroboy. Within a year, the name became synonymous with catchy electronic music in Switzerland. Collaborations with national and international artists (musicians, graphic and visual artists, art collectives,) followed. In summer 2005, Electroboy began producing electronic music as a Dada Artist. He went on tour around Switzerland in spring 2005. Between 2005 and 2006 he released four CDs.

In 2009 Burkhardt was founder of the "Cabaret Voltaire" in Berlin and since 2013 he has been active as graphic artist, clothing designer and as a columnist for a popular Swiss online newspaper.

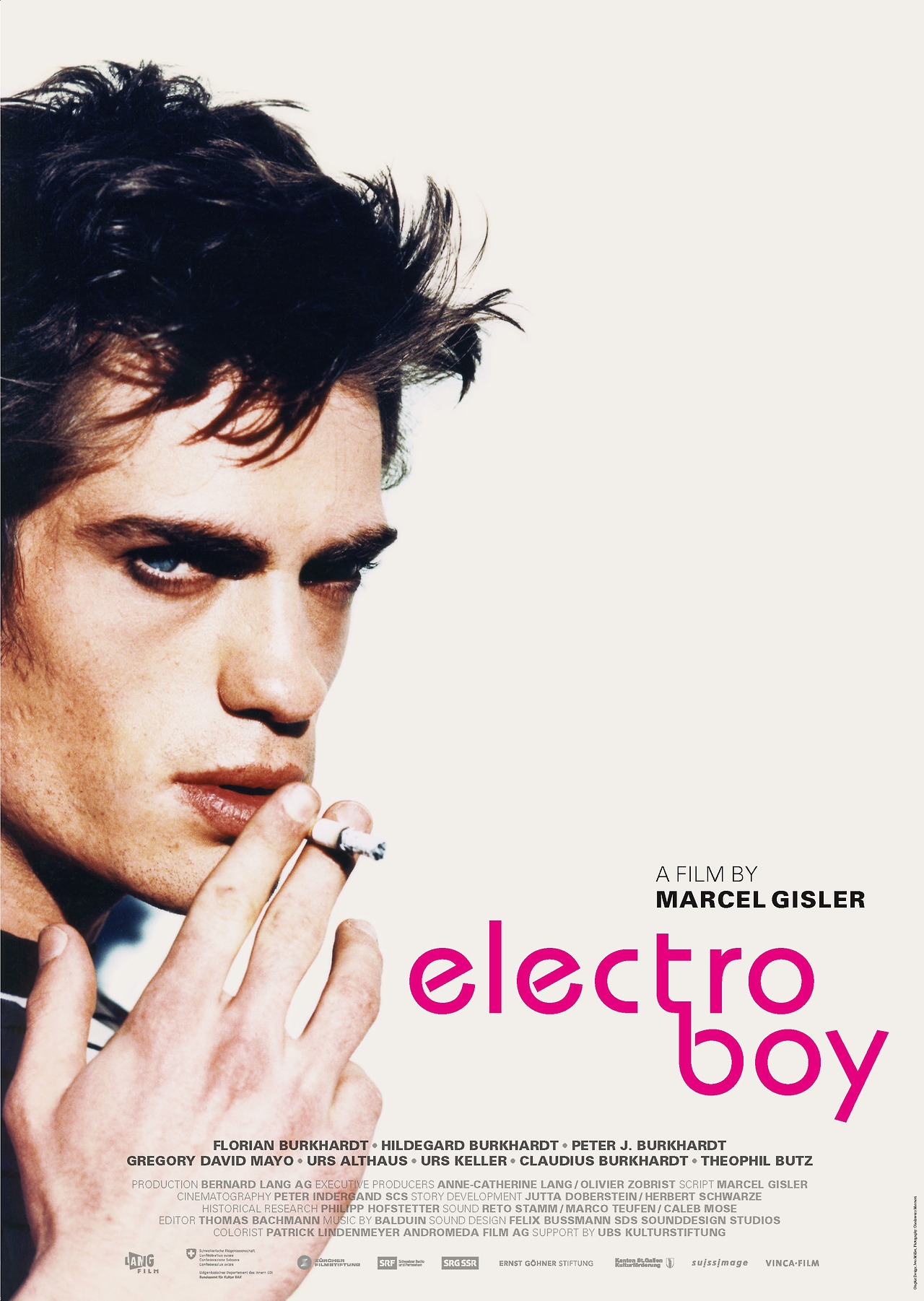
Burkhardt on the "electroboy" film poster

Burkardt's life is subject of the documentary Electroboy directed by Marcel Gisler, that was launched in August 2014 at the Locarno International Film Festival.

== Books ==
- STOP (2004)
- Das Kind meiner Mutter (2017)
- Das Gewicht der Freiheit (2018)

== Discography ==
- Electroboy (2005)
- 50 mg (2005)
- Hör die Emotionen (2006)
- Der grosse Pop (2006)
- Form Banal (2008)
- Das fliegende Spaghettimonster (2019)

== See also ==
- List of electroclash bands and artists
- List of Swiss composers
- List of synthpop artists
