= Carolyn Farina =

American actress (born 1965)

- Born: December 7, 1963 (age 62); Bayside, Queens, New York, U.S.
- Occupations: Actress, psychologist

Carolyn Farina (born December 7, 1963) is an American actress best known for her starring role as Audrey Rouget in the 1990 Whit Stillman film Metropolitan.

== Career ==
Farina was born and raised in Bayside, Queens, New York. Her father left the family very early. A shy child, she began acting classes in grade school. After high school, she had jobs as a waitress, secretary, and receptionist. She spent one semester at Queens College, and also studied acting at a variety of venues including the Lee Strasberg Institute.

She had no professional acting experience or agent when she auditioned for, and was cast as the lead in, Whit Stillman's 1990 independent film Metropolitan. Her performance received very favorable reviews, which noted her sensitivity and perceptiveness.

Apart from a brief non-speaking cameo reprisal of her character Audrey Rouget in Stillman's follow-up film The Last Days of Disco (1998), during the 1990s following her starring role in Metropolitan, Farina received only small roles in two more films. These were a non-speaking role in Little Noises (1992), which was directed by Jane Spencer, and a small role as the protagonist's sister in The Age of Innocence (1993), which was directed by Martin Scorsese.

She returned to college after this period and earned a master's degree in psychology, and made a new career working as a child psychologist.

In 2011 she appeared briefly in Whit Stillman's Damsels in Distress, playing a waitress in a diner. In 2023, she appeared in the film A View of the World from Fifth Avenue, which premiered at the Bentonville Film Festival before being released to video on demand.

== Filmography ==
| Year | Title | Role | Notes |
|---|---|---|---|
| 1990 | Metropolitan | Audrey Rouget | |
| 1992 | Little Noises | Cousin Linny | credited as Caroline Farina |
| 1993 | The Age of Innocence | Janey Archer | |
| 1998 | The Last Days of Disco | Audrey Rouget | |
| 2011 | Damsels in Distress | Carolina Antonucci | |
| 2023 | A View of the World from Fifth Avenue | Phoebe Wilson | video on demand |
