= Jale Arıkan =

Turkish-German actress

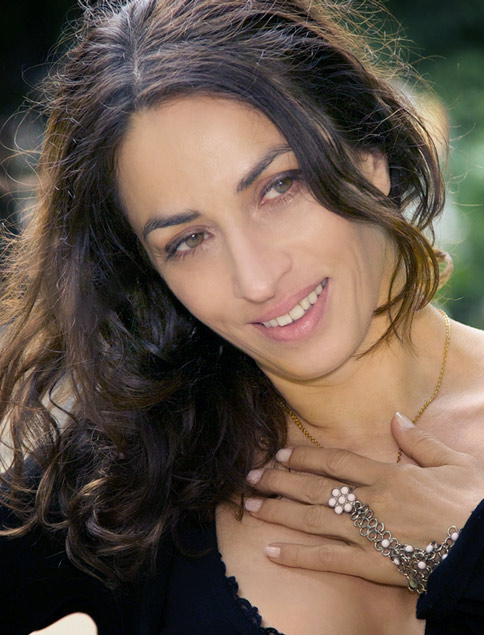
- Arikan in 2014
- Born: 22 August 1965 (age 60); Istanbul, Turkey
- Occupation: Actress
- Years active: 1987–present

Jale Arıkan (born 22 August 1965) is a Turkish-German film and television actress. At the 35th Moscow International Film Festival in 2013, she won the Silver George for Best Actress for her role in the film Particle (2012) which won the Golden George.

== Career ==
Arıkan was born in Turkey but later moved to Germany where she successfully pursued a career in acting. She showed a preference for thrillers and dramas. She has starred in several popular German-language television series, including Ein Fall für zwei (1987–1992), Rivalen der Rennbahn (1989), Hotel Paradies (1990), Tatort (1990–2012), Praxis Bülowbogen (1992), Wolffs Revier (1992), Der Fahnder (1994), Schwarz greift ein (1995), Abschnitt 40 (2003), Leipzig Homicide (2009), Stolberg (2009), Dahoam is Dahoam (2009–2010), Küstenwache (2011), and Der Lehrer (2015).

She starred as Polish Nadenka in the 2005 Luxembourgish film Your Name is Justine which was nominated at the 79th Academy Awards for the Academy Award for Best Foreign Language Film.

She was cast as Naomi in the English-language television film Samson and Delilah (1996).

== Awards and nominations ==
At the 35th Moscow International Film Festival in 2013, she received the Silver George for Best Actress for her role in Particle. In 2014, she also won the award Best Actress in the Turkish Film Festival Frankfurt.

== Filmography ==
=== Film ===
Year	Title	Role	Notes
1989	Vatanyolu – Die Heimreise	Selvi	
1989	The Storyteller	Ivy	
1990	Sleepy Betrayers	Miriam	
1990	Eine Liebe in Istanbul	Nursim	
1991	The Nude		
1992	Shadow Boxer	Leyla	
1992	Misunderstanding of the Moon		
1993	Tersine Dünya		
1995	Pack mich	Leonie	Short film
1995	Nachtbus		Short film
1995	Grenzgänger		Short film
1998	Avcı	Zala	
2002	Nothing Less Than the Best	Lili	
2004	Sie wird ...		Short film
2004	Soundless	Friend of the Russians	
2004	Hinter der Tür	Sabiya Çetin	Short film
2005	Your Name is Justine	Nadenka	
2006	Zucker im Blut	Dancer	Short film
2007	Porno!Melo!Drama!		
2008	1. Mai	Yavuz's mother	
2008	Evet, I Do!		
2012	Zenne Dancer	Şükran	
2012	Particle	Zeynep	
2016	Mrs Nebile's Wormhole	Mrs Nebile	Short film
2021	Kerr		
2024	Elbow		

=== Television ===
Year	Title	Role	Notes
1987–1992	Ein Fall für zwei	Ilse	
1989	Rivalen der Rennbahn		
1990	Hotel Paradies	Isabel	
1990–2012	Tatort	Uschi Petzold/Sabine	
1992	Praxis Bülowbogen		
1992	Business with Friends	Turkish woman	TV short film
1992	Wolffs Revier	Katja	
1993	Glückliche Reise	Rosa Saebra	
1993	Maus und Katz	Ana	TV film
1994	Nacht der Frauen	Hülya	TV mini-series
1994	Der Fahnder		
1994–1995	Ärzte		
1995	Schwarz greift ein		
1995	Die Partner		
1995	Tot auf Halde	Christina	TV film
1996	Landgang für Ring		TV film
1996	Max Wolkenstein	Farah	
1996	Samson and Delilah	Naomi	TV film
1998	An Angel's Revenge	Ayse	TV film
2000	Schimanski muss leiden	Nadiye	TV film
2002	Einmal Star in Hollywood	Herself	TV documentary
2003	Abschnitt 40	Doctor Winzer	
2005	3 Wild Angels	Doctor Ariane Foster	
2006	Der beste Lehrer der Welt		TV film
2007	Ein starkes Team	Turkish barmaid	
2008	Augenzeugin	Ira	TV film
2009	Leipzig Homicide	Yasemin Scröter	
2009	Stolberg	Monika Strecker	
2009–2010	Dahoam is Dahoam	Yıldız Kesoğlu	
2010	Der Kriminalist	Ayşe Şahin	
2011	Küstenwache	Doctor Marlies Tenhagen	
2012	Veda	Behice	
2013	The Dad Test	Simay	TV film
2014	Her Sevda Bir Veda	Selma	
2014–2015	Kiraz Mevsimi	Monika Tessa	
2015	Der Lehrer		
2015	Kommissar Marthaler – Ein allzu schönes Mädchen	Gazetti, service station owner	TV film
2015	Letzte Spur Berlin	Ulya Buchner	
