= Elbow (film) =

2024 coming-of-age film

- Festival release poster
- German: Ellbogen
- Directed by: Aslı Özarslan
- Screenplay by: Aslı Özarslan; Claudia Schaefer
- Based on: Ellbogen by Fatma Aydemir
- Produced by: Jamila Wenske; Delphine Schmit & Guillaume Dreyfus; Anna Maria Aslanlogu; Julia Peters and Jutta Feit
- Starring: Melia Kara; Doğa Gürer; Berk Torun
- Cinematography: Andac Karabeyoglu-Thomas
- Edited by: Ana Branea; David J. Achilles
- Music by: Delphine Mantoulet
- Production companies: Achtung Panda!; Tripode Productions (FR); Istos Film (TR); jip film & verleih (DE)
- Distributed by: jip Film & Verleih
- Release date: 17 February 2024 (Berlinale)
- Running time: 86 minutes
- Countries: Germany; France; Turkey
- Languages: German; Turkish

Elbow (German: Ellbogen) is a 2024 coming-of-age drama film co-written and directed by Aslı Özarslan in her directorial debut. The film, an adaptation of the Franz-Hessel-Preis and Klaus-Michael Kühne prize-winning German novel Ellbogen by Fatma Aydemir, is a story about 17-year-old Hazal, who lives in Berlin. Her biggest wish for her 18th birthday is to escape the everyday grind and party with her friends. But a fatal incident changes everything and she is forced to flee.

The international co-production between Germany, Turkey and France was selected for the Generation 14plus section at the 74th Berlin International Film Festival, where it had its world premiere on 17 February and competed for the Crystal Bear for the Best Film. Aslı Özarslan, making her feature directing debut, was nominated for GWFF Best First Feature Award at the festival.

== Synopsis ==
17-year-old Hazal lives in Berlin. She wants a chance in life; her fervent wish is to get one step further than her parents. Her mother pushes her to get a hairdressing apprenticeship, while her aunt Semra, a social worker, encourages Hazal to finish her Abitur. She works at her mother's bakery and fails to get any response to her hundreds of job applications. She attends job training programs, but encounters discrimination and she finds them to be too time-consuming.

On her 18th birthday, she wants to forget her humdrum life, and party with her best friends. Disappointed after being turned away from a club, they get into a fight with a student in a subway station, and he dies after Hazal shoves him onto the subway tracks. Hazal flees to Istanbul to live with Mehmet, a call centre agent that she regularly flirts with over Skype. He turns out to be a drug addict and is physically abusive towards her. During a police raid on Mehmet's apartment, during which Mehmet's roommate was to be arrested for political agitation, Hazal's head is injured, but she is able to escape. Hazal contacts Semra, who comes to Istanbul and tells her that she has been charged with manslaughter. Semra urges Hazal to turn herself in to the police and to finish secondary school in prison. Hazal hugs her aunt and runs away alone.

== Cast ==
- Melia Kara as Hazal
- Asya Utku as Gül
- Jamilah Bagdach as Elma
- Nurgül Ayduran as Ebru
- Doğa Gürer as Mehmet
- Mina Özlem Sağdiç as Semra
- Jale Arıkan as Sultan
- Ali-Emre Sahin as Onur
- Ercan Karacayli as Salih
- Idil Baydar (Gilet Ayse) as Ms. Göktan
- Shadi Eck as Mahdi
- Halil as Haydar Sahin
- Ömer Kuzu as Orhan Kiliç
- Katrine Eichberger as Ms. Meyer
- Jörg Pintsch as Lars Immer/shop detective
- Denis Riffel as Thorsten
- Berk Torun as Eren

== Production ==
Principal photography began on 15 August 2022 in Istanbul and Berlin. Filming ended on 15 October 2022 with filming locations in various regions of Berlin and Turkey.

== Release ==
Elbow had its world premiere on 17 February 2024, as part of the 74th Berlin International Film Festival, in the Generation 14plus section.

== Reception ==
Vladan Petkovic, reviewing the film at the Berlinale for Cineuropa, wrote "Özarslan's coming-of-age film set in the Berlin immigrant community and Istanbul stands out for its storytelling economy, unusually dark atmosphere, and thematic variety and depth." Julia Lorenz of Die Zeit called Elbow "the best youth film in recent German film history."

== Accolades ==
The film was selected for the Generation 14plus section at the 74th Berlin International Film Festival; it was thus nominated to compete for the Crystal Bear award.

Award	Date	Category	Recipient	Result	Ref.
Berlin International Film Festival	25 February 2024	Generation 14plus Crystal Bear for Best Feature Film	Aslı Özarslan	Nominated	
Berlin International Film Festival	25 February 2024	GWFF Best First Feature Award	Aslı Özarslan	Nominated	
