= The Ninth Cloud =

- Directed by: Jane Spencer
- Written by: Jane Spencer; Lucy Shuttleworth
- Produced by: Jane Spencer; Gia Muresan; Wendy Thomas; Julia Verdin; Christo Dimassis; Richard Hudson
- Starring: Michael Madsen; Jean-Hugues Anglade; Meredith Ostrom; Megan Maczko; Joshua Feinman; Wendy Thomas, Leo Gregory
- Release date: 5 April 2014
- Running time: 93 minutes
- Country: Switzerland
- Language: English

The Ninth Cloud (also known under the working titles Bob's Not Gay, Men Don't Lie, and Cloud Nine) is a 2014 independent comedy-drama film directed by Jane Spencer. It follows a dreamy young woman in love with an American expatriate.

== Synopsis ==
Zena is a beautiful vulnerable young London woman that goes through her life in a dream-like haze. She falls in love with an American expatriate aspiring theatre director, whom she idolizes as perfect.

== Cast ==
- Megan Maczko as Zena
- Michael Madsen as Bob
- Jean-Hugues Anglade as Jonny
- Meredith Ostrom as Miriam
- Elodie Betrisey as Bumble
- Ian Webster as Guy Wordsworth
- Wendy Thomas as Gemma
- Gabrielle Ryan as Princess Mariba

== Production ==
Plans to film The Ninth Cloud (then titled Bob's Not Gay) were announced in 2006. The following year William Baldwin, Irène Jacob, and Julia Jentsch signed on to perform in the film, and filming was slated to begin May 2007 in Bucharest. Financial difficulties delayed shooting and the film's working title and star lineup changed several times. Actor Guillaume Depardieu was at one point attached to the movie but Spencer was forced to recast after Depardieu died in 2008. After casting Madsen and Maczko, Spencer began and completed principal shooting in 2011 and the film was in post production in 2012 and 2013.
