= Alberto Morais =

Spanish director (born 1976)

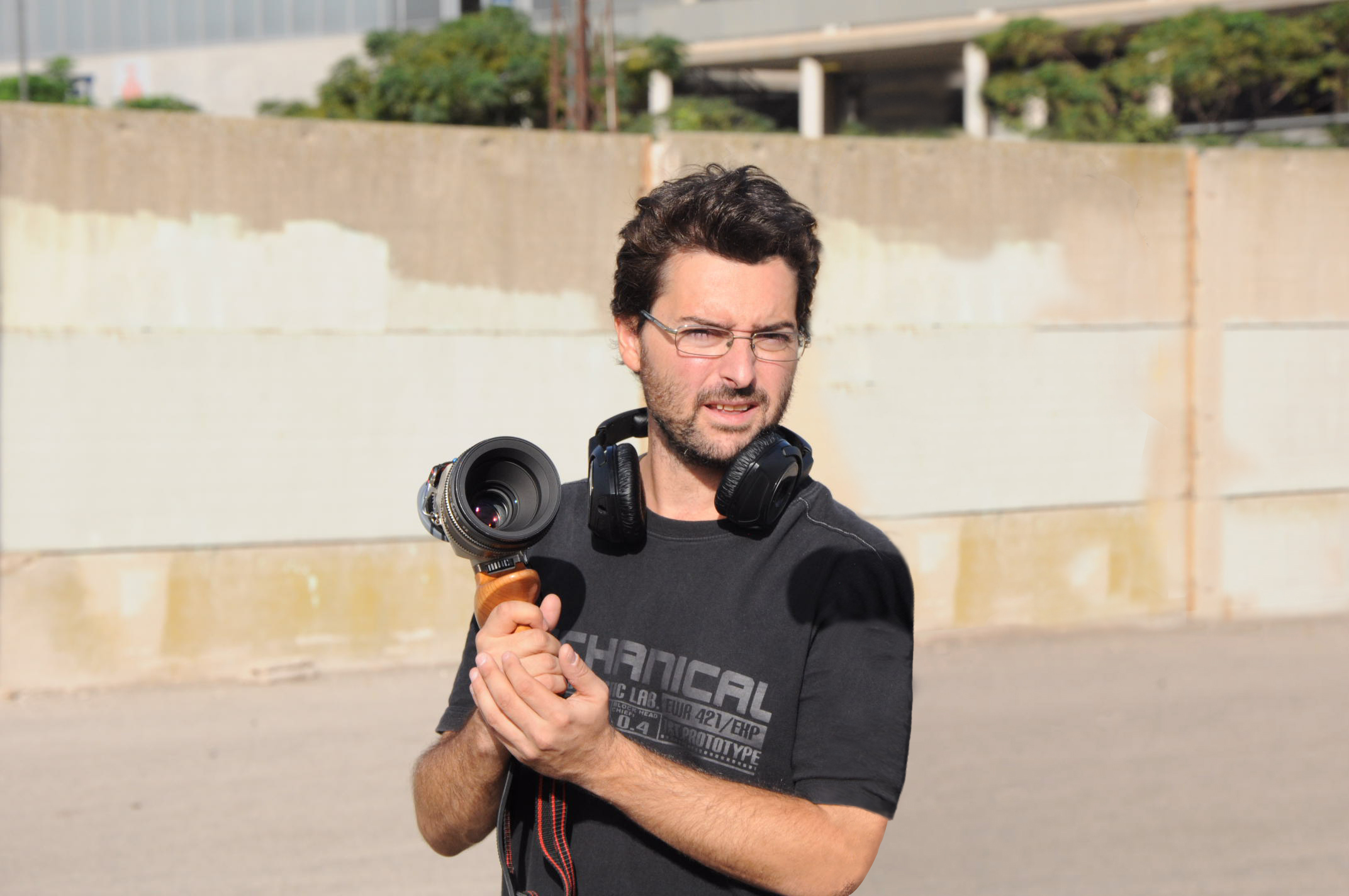
Image of Alberto Morais

Alberto Morais Foruria (born 23 March 1976, in Valladolid) is a Spanish film director, best known for his films Las olas (2011), for which we won the Golden George Award and the FIPRESCI Award at the 35th Moscow International Film Festival, Los Chicos del Puerto (2013), for which he won Best Screenplay at the Tirana International Film Festival, and La Madre (2016). His feature film The Black Land premiered in 2025.
