= I Am Not Him =

- Film poster
- Turkish: Ben O Değilim
- Directed by: Tayfun Pirselimoğlu
- Written by: Tayfun Pirselimoğlu
- Produced by: Veysel İpek, Nikos Moustakas, Guillaume de Seille, Konstantina Stavrianou, İnci Demirkol, İrfan Demirkol
- Starring: Ercan Kesal; Maryam Zaree
- Music by: Giorgos Koumendakis
- Release date: November 2013 (TCF)
- Running time: 125 minutes
- Countries: Turkey, Germany, France, Greece
- Language: Turkish

I Am Not Him (Turkish: Ben O Değilim) is a 2013 Turkish crime film directed by Tayfun Pirselimoğlu.

== Awards ==
- Best Turkish film at IFF (2014)
