= My Marlon and Brando =

2008 Turkish film

- Directed by: Hüseyin Karabey
- Starring: Ayça Damgacı; Hama Ali Khan
- Release date: 25 January 2008 (IFFR)
- Running time: 1h 33min
- Country: Turkey
- Languages: English; Kurdish; Turkish

My Marlon and Brando (Turkish: Gitmek: Benim Marlon ve Brandom) is a 2008 Turkish drama film directed by Hüseyin Karabey. It is based on a real life story where a Turkish woman struggles to meet her lover from Iraqi Kurdistan.

== Cast ==
- Ayça Damgacı as Ayça
- Hama Ali Khan as Hama Ali
- Cengiz Bozkurt as Kaçakçı Azad
- Nesrin Cavadzade as Derya
