= Ercan Kesal =

Turkish actor, director and physician

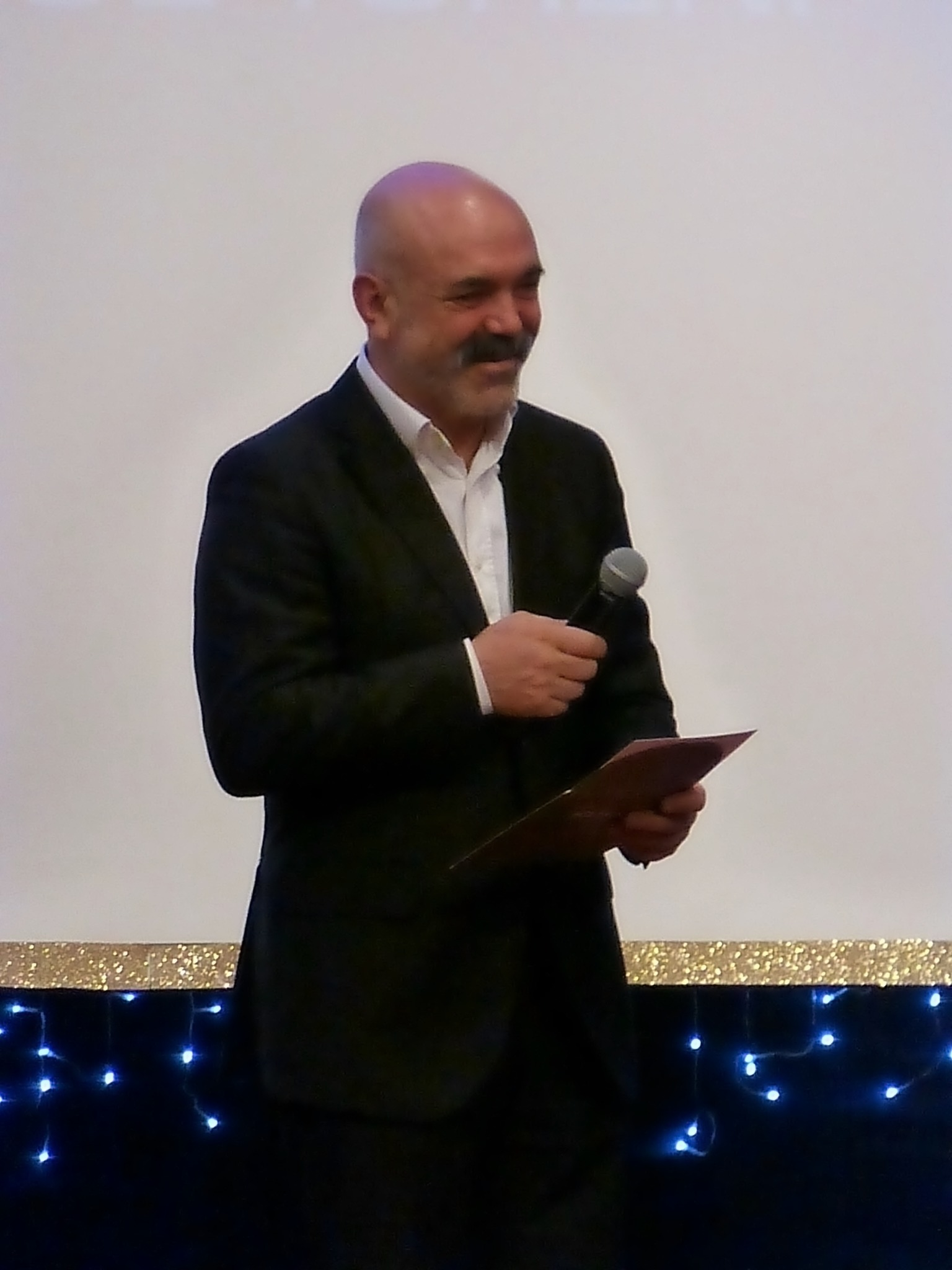
- Born: 12 September 1959 (age 66); Avanos, Nevşehir, Turkey
- Occupations: Actor, scriptwriter, director, writer, physician
- Years active: 2002–present
- Spouse: Nazan Kesal
- Website: www.ercankesal.com

Ercan Kesal (born 12 September 1959) is a Turkish actor, director, writer and physician.

Kesal graduated from Ege University's medical school in 1984. He worked as a physician at Keskin State Hospital, and at clinics in Balâ and the districts surrounding it.

He started his acting career in 2002 with a role in Nuri Bilge Ceylan's movie Uzak. He also wrote the script for the movie Bir Zamanlar Anadolu'da together with Ebru and Nuri Bilge Ceylan. In 2011, the movie received a nomination for the Best Script award at the Asia Pacific Screen Awards.

Aside from his career as an actor, he has published a number of books, including Peri Gazozu (2013), Nasipse Adayız (2015), Cin Aynası (2016), Bozkırda Bir Gece Yarısı (2017) and Aslında... (2017) by İletişim Yayınları and Evvel Zaman (2014) by İthaki Yayınları.

== Filmography ==
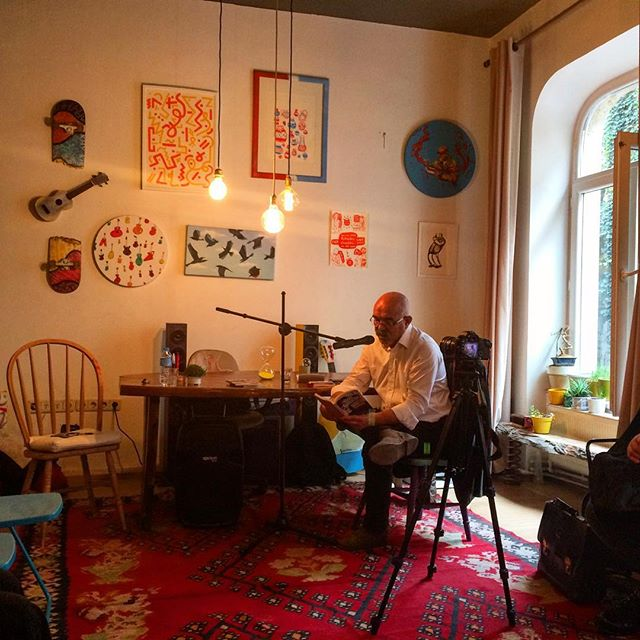
Ercan Kesal during a reading session in 2015.

- The Things You Kill, 2025
- Aldatmak, 2022 (Ali Sezai Okuyan)
- Beni Çok Sev, 2021 (Sedat)
- Üç Kuruş, 2021 (Halit)
- Menajerimi Ara, 2020 (guest appearance)
- Alef, 2020
- Nasipse Adayız, 2020
- Görülmüştür, 2019
- The Announcement, 2018
- Çukur, 2017–2019; 2020; 2021 (İdris Koçovalı)
- Cehennem, 2017
- İçerde, 2016 (Akin Isik (Kostenceli))
- Ben O Değilim, 2014
- Hükümet Kadın 2, 2013
- Ben de Özledim, 2013
- Sen Aydınlatırsın Geceyi, 2013
- Yozgat Blues, 2013
- Hükümet Kadın, 2012
- Mold, 2012
- Bir Zamanlar Anadolu'da, 2011
- Albatrosun Yolculuğu, 2010
- Vavien, 2009
- Üç Maymun, 2008
- Uzak, 2002

== Awards ==
- 20th Golden Boll Film Festival, 2013, Best Actor, Yozgat Blues
- Slovakia Art Film Festival, 2013, Best Actor, Mold
- 32nd International Istanbul Film Festival, 2013, Best Actor, Yozgat Blues
- 44th SİYAD Awards, 2011, Best Supporting Actor, Bir Zamanlar Anadolu'da
- 44th SİYAD Awards, 2011, Best Script, Bir Zamanlar Anadolu'da
- 1st Yeşilçam Film Academy Awards, 2011, Best Script, Bir Zamanlar Anadolu'da
- 14th Sadri Alışık Awards, 2009, Best Supporting Actor, Üç Maymun
- 2009 Yeşilçam Awards, 2009, Best Script, Üç Maymun

== Bibliography ==
- Peri Gazozu, Istanbul: İletişim Yayınları 2013 (ISBN 9789750512018)
- Evvel Zaman, Istanbul: İthaki Yayınları 2014 (ISBN 9786053753780)
- Nasipse Adayız, Istanbul: İletişim Yayınları 2015 (ISBN 9789750518447)
- Cin Aynası, Istanbul: İletişim Yayınları 2016 (ISBN 9789750520358)
- Bozkırda Bir Gece Yarısı, Istanbul: İletişim Yayınları 2017 (ISBN 9789750521638)
- Aslında..., Istanbul: İletişim Yayınları 2017 (ISBN 9789750522796)
- Kendi Işığında Yanan Adam - Tanıdığım Metin Erksan, Istanbul: İletişim Yayınları 2018 (ISBN 9789750525285)
- Velhasıl, Istanbul: İletişim Yayınları 2019 (ISBN 9789750527494)
