= Nina Siemaszko =

American actress (born 1970)

- Born: Antonina Jadwiga Siemaszko; July 14, 1970 (age 56); Chicago, Illinois, U.S.
- Education: DePaul University
- Occupation: Actress
- Years active: 1986–present
- Relatives: Casey Siemaszko (brother)

Antonina Jadwiga Siemaszko (shye-MOSH-ko; born July 14, 1970) is an American actress, best known for her film roles in Little Noises (1991), The Saint of Fort Washington (1993), and for her role as Eleanor Bartlet in The West Wing (2001–2006).

== Biography ==
Siemaszko was born in Chicago. Her father, Konstanty Siemaszko, was a Polish-born Roman Catholic, and a survivor of the Polish Underground and the Sachsenhausen concentration camp. He escaped to the United Kingdom where he met Nina's mother, Collette McAllister. One of her brothers is actor Casey Siemaszko. Her other brother, Corky, is a writer for the Daily News and a reporter at NBC News. She attended The Theatre School at DePaul University. She played an undercover cop in Reservoir Dogs featured in a scene that wound up on the cutting room floor ensuring that the work became a rare example of a film containing no dialogue delivered by an actress. It was released on DVD. She played Mia Farrow in the CBS miniseries Sinatra. She played the leading role in Wild Orchid II: Two Shades of Blue.

== Filmography ==
=== Film ===
| Year | Title | Role | Notes |
|---|---|---|---|
| 1986 | One More Saturday Night | Karen Lundahl | |
| 1988 | License to Drive | Natalie Anderson | |
| 1988 | Tucker: The Man and His Dream | Marilyn Lee Tucker | |
| 1989 | Lost Angels | Merilee | |
| 1991 | Bed & Breakfast | Cassie Wellesly | |
| 1991 | Wild Orchid II: Two Shades of Blue | "Blue" McDonald | |
| 1991 | Little Noises | Dolores | |
| 1992 | Reservoir Dogs | Officer Jody McClusky | Deleted scenes |
| 1993 | The Saint of Fort Washington | Tamsen | |
| 1994 | Floundering | Gal | |
| 1994 | Airheads | Suzzi | |
| 1995 | Power of Attorney | Maria | Video |
| 1995 | Love and Happiness | Nina | |
| 1995 | The American President | Beth Wade | |
| 1996 | Johns | Tiffany | |
| 1997 | Runaway Car | Jenny Todd | |
| 1997 | Suicide Kings | Jennifer | |
| 1998 | Goodbye Lover | Newscaster | |
| 1997 | Kiss & Tell | Shelly | |
| 1999 | Jakob the Liar | Rosa | |
| 1999 | The Big Tease | Betty Fuego | |
| 2000 | Sleep Easy, Hutch Rimes | Holly Proudfit | |
| 2008 | The Haunting of Molly Hartley | Dr. Amelia Emerson | |
| 2011 | Lily Look Here | Delia | Short |
| 2017 | The Hatred | Miriam | |

=== Television ===
| Year | Title | Role | Notes |
|---|---|---|---|
| 1989 | Lonesome Dove | Janey | Miniseries |
| 1990 | An Enemy of the People | Polly Stockman | Television film |
| 1992 | Sinatra | Mia Farrow | Miniseries |
| 1992 | Red Shoe Diaries | Trudy | "Just Like That" |
| 1993 | Tales from the Crypt | Stella Bishop | "Creep Course" |
| 1994 | Baby Brokers | Leeanne Dees | Television film |
| 1994 | Chicago Hope | Gloria McKinnon | "You Gotta Have Heart" |
| 1995 | Sawbones | Jenny Sloan | Television film |
| 1997 | Runaway Car | Jenny Todd | Television film |
| 1998 | More Tales of the City | Mona Ramsey | Miniseries |
| 1999 | Sports Night | Holly | "What Kind of Day Has It Been?" |
| 1999 | Cold Feet | Bob | "How Much Is That Sex Act in the Window" |
| 2000 | The Huntress | Dorinda Patterson | "Springing Tiny" |
| 2000 | The Darkling | Marla Obold | Television film |
| 2001 | NYPD Blue | Debra | "Family Ties" |
| 2001 | The Guardian | Suzanna Clemons | "The Men from the Boys" |
| 2001 | Philly | Teresa Wyatt | "Fork You Very Much" |
| 2001–2006 | The West Wing | Eleanor Bartlet | Recurring role 9 episodes |
| 2003 | A Carol Christmas | Roberta Timmins | Television film |
| 2004 | Judging Amy | Christy Wolinsky | "Baggage Claim" |
| 2004 | CSI: Crime Scene Investigation | Linley Parker | "Bloodlines" |
| 2005–2007 | Mystery Woman | Cassie Hillman | Television film |
| 2006 | Law & Order: Criminal Intent | Claudia Duffy | "Maltese Cross" |
| 2006–2010 | Cold Case | Julie Vera | 2 episodes |
| 2007 | Without a Trace | Celia | "Clean Up" |
| 2007 | Private Practice | Kathleen | 2 episodes |
| 2009 | Eli Stone | Katie Bochner | "Sonoma" |
| 2009 | Grey's Anatomy | Kate Carlson | "No Good at Saying Sorry (One More Chance)" |
| 2009 | Mental | Mimi Peters | "Obsessively Yours" |
| 2009 | Saving Grace | Heather | "That Was No First Kiss" |
| 2010 | Past Life | Sharon Moody | "Running on Empty" |
| 2011 | Prime Suspect | Peggy | "Underwater" |
| 2016 | Togetherness | Lindsay | "Everybody Is Grownups" |
| 2017 | American Crime | Laura | 2 episodes |
| 2018 | Hailey Dean Mystery: A Will to Kill | Olivia | Television film |

=== Video games ===
| Year | Title | Role |
|---|---|---|
| 2004 | Grand Theft Auto: San Andreas | Pedestrian |
| 2009 | Jak and Daxter: The Lost Frontier | Computer / Aeropan Female / Pirate Female |
