= Fögi Is a Bastard =

F. es un salud
- Directed by: Marcel Gisler
- Written by: Marcel Gisler; Rudolf Nadler
- Based on: F. est un salaud by Martin Frank
- Starring: Frédéric Andrau; Vincent Branchet
- Cinematography: Sophie Maintigneux
- Edited by: Bettina Böhler
- Music by: Rainer Lingk
- Production company: Vega Film
- Distributed by: Vega Distribution
- Release date: April 28, 1998 (France)
- Running time: 91 minutes
- Countries: France; Switzerland
- Language: French

F. est un salaud (English title F. Is a Bastard or Fögi Is a Bastard, released in German as De Fögi isch en Souhund) is a 1998 French/Swiss film based upon the novel ter fögi isch e souhung by Martin Frank. It was filmed in Zürich, Switzerland. The setting is the early 1970s, Zurich. The film was shown in 1999 at the Locarno Film Festival, the Toronto International Film Festival, and the 1998 Toronto International Film Festival.

== Plot summary ==
Beni, age 15, becomes enamoured with the lead singer of the struggling rock band "The Minks", Fögi Müller, who is ten years older than him. Fögi ensnares him with the perceived glamour of being a musician, takes him on as the band's 'roadie', and at the same time seduces him. Beni unquestionably follows him, including following him into drug addiction. Beni's youthful innocence is destroyed in a milieu of sex, drinking, drugs, and rock-and-roll. He ends up prostituting himself to pay for Fögi's drug habit.

== Primary cast ==
- Frédéric Andrau ... Fögi
- Vincent Branchet ... Beni Müller
- Urs Peter Halter ... Töbe
- Jean-Pierre von Dach ... Wäde

== See also ==
- List of lesbian, gay, bisexual or transgender-related films
