= The Prophet Murders =

2003 novel by Mehmet Murat Somer

- The Prophet Murders cover
- Author: Mehmet Murat Somer
- Original title: Peygamber Cinayetleri
- Translator: Kenneth Dakan
- Language: Turkish
- Series: Hop-Çiki-Yaya
- Genre: Crime novel
- Publisher: Serpent's Tail
- Publication place: Turkey
- English publication date: 8 May 2008
- Media type: Print (Paperback)
- Pages: 224 pp
- ISBN: 978-1-84668-633-7
- OCLC: 195730885
- Followed by: The Kiss Murder

The Prophet Murders (Peygamber Cinayetleri in Turkish) is a Turkish detective fiction novel by Mehmet Murat Somer originally published in Turkish by İletişim Yayınları in 2003 and in English by Serpent's Tail in 2008. It is the first published entry in the author's Hop-Çiki-Yaya series about an unnamed transvestite amateur detective in Istanbul.

== Publishing history ==
Somer wrote “The Prophet Murders” along with two other novels in the Hop-Ciki-Yaya series back-to-back in 2001, after health problems forced him into semi-retirement, but had trouble finding a publisher as, “His characterisation of radical Islamic groups proved a tough sell for small publishing companies.” Finally Iletisim Yayinlari, who had published one of Somer's favourite books, My Name is Red by Orhan Pamuk, agreed to take on the project commencing in 2003 with this the second book in the series, and Somer credit the prestigious company's stamp of approval with, “protecting the books from a hostile reception." Serpent's Tail published Kenneth Dakan's English translation of this novel in 2008 with Somer stating that, “I believe, the Nobel prize Orhan Pamuk won, opened the international door for Turkish writers, including me."

== Synopsis ==
The narrator sets out to investigate the mysterious death of two of the employees at the transvestite nightclub she runs, only two discover that they are part of a larger sequence of murders of transvestites named after the prophets.

== Reviews ==
"This is heady ground," according to Peter Millar of The Times, “for a camp comedic thriller, especially when it is littered with references to rampant homosexual practice." "The novel promises at first to be as screamingly camp as its hero/ine's wardrobe," agrees Jake Kerridge of The Daily Telegraph, “but turns out to be quite sober and thoughtful, witty rather than arch and restrained even when filthy."

"The mystery part of The Prophet Murders unwinds fairly predictably: it's a paint-by-the-numbers work in that respect,” states The Complete Review, “though competently enough done to satisfy most fans of the genre." "I couldn't have cared less ‘whodunit’ in The Prophet Murders,” confirms Chris Wiegand of The Guardian as, "Somer says he considers plot secondary to character and atmosphere."

"The real appeal of the novel," agrees The Complete Review, "is in the milieu it describes, and in the main character. The narrator is an entertaining figure, immersed in the transvestite scene but also understanding that aspects of it are hard to take entirely seriously." "Somer's effervescent hero sashays and shimmies around town," confirms Wiegand and, "The hero's investigations are frequently put on hold for trips to the beauty salon." "Many of the queens are ridiculously dim and/or fussy," states The Complete Review, "making for an amusing cast of characters (though even this gets a bit monotonous)," but Wiegand concludes that, “the novel's lively cast and punchy chapters kept me gripped."

According to Wiegand, "Somer also colours his crime plot with dashes of social commentary and comedy." “Fairly daringly, Somer also brings the religious issues to the fore, describing a society of homosexuals repressed by the demands and precepts of the prevalent religion -- and the sometimes very unpleasant consequences thereof,” confirms The Complete Review before concluding that, "It's no surprise that the prophet-murderer behind the crimes has issues which are grounded in the fundamentals of this society.".

"Its portrayal of Istanbul's alternative scene makes one glad to feel one's life comparatively dull," states Kerridge and according to Millar, "As such it is a healthy and well-timed reminder that our stereotypes can be well wide of the mark, as well as a chilly amusing high-adrenalin romp through what seems at times like an alternative universe." "Fairly amusing, with a few uncomfortably graphic scenes, The Prophet Murders is an unusual exotic murder mystery,” summarises The Complete Review, “Somer has a nice, easy-going tone and manner (though it too often doesn't go anywhere far) and there's certainly potential for the series."
