= Rosie (2013 film) =

2013 film

- Directed by: Marcel Gisler
- Written by: Marcel Gisler; Rudolf Nadler
- Produced by: Susann Rüdlinger
- Starring: Sibylle Brunner
- Cinematography: Sophie Maintigneux
- Release date: January 2013
- Running time: 106 minutes
- Country: Switzerland
- Language: Swiss German

Rosie is a 2013 Swiss drama film directed by Marcel Gisler and written by Gisler and Rudolf Nadler. Starring Sibylle Brunner and Fabian Krüger, it follows a writer who returns from Berlin to eastern Switzerland to care for his elderly mother. The film received six nominations for the 2013 Swiss Film Awards, with Brunner winning Best Actress.

== Synopsis ==
Lorenz Meran, a successful gay writer in his forties, returns from Berlin to eastern Switzerland to care for his elderly mother Rosie. As Rosie resists both outside help and moving into a nursing home, Lorenz becomes caught up in family conflict, old secrets, and a new romance.

== Cast ==
The cast includes:

- Sibylle Brunner as Rosie
- Fabian Krüger as Lorenz Meran
- Sebastian Ledesma as Mario
- Judith Hofmann as Sophie Meran
- Hans Rudolf Twerenbold as Markus

== Reception ==
=== Awards and nominations ===
The film premiered in January 2013. In Switzerland, it recorded 29,143 admissions. It was the opening film of the 48th Solothurn Film Festival, received six nominations for the 2013 Swiss Film Awards, and also competed in the main competition at the 35th Moscow International Film Festival. It won several awards, including the Main Jury Award for Best Feature Fiction at the Mezipatra Queer Film Festival in Prague in 2013, the Audience Award for Best Film at the Ljubljana Gay and Lesbian Film Festival in 2013, the Audience Award for Best Feature Film at the Pink Apple Film Festival in Zurich in 2013, and the Audience Award at Queer Lisboa in 2014. Sibylle Brunner also won the Swiss Film Award for Best Actress in 2013.

=== Critical response ===
Filmbulletin described the film as a careful portrayal of ageing, family relationships, and change, and placed it within a humanist film tradition. Filmdienst described the film as a simple yet layered family drama that balances drama, comedy, and romance.

== Festival screenings ==
In 2014 and 2015, Rosie was screened at a number of international film festivals, including the Palm Springs International Film Festival, the Max Ophüls Preis film festival in Saarbrücken, Queer Lisboa, the Les Arcs European Film Festival, and the Identities Queer Film Festival.
