= Particle (film) =

2012 film

- Film poster
- Directed by: Erdem Tepegöz
- Written by: Erdem Tepegöz
- Produced by: Kagan Daldal
- Starring: Jale Arıkan
- Cinematography: Marton Miklauzic
- Edited by: Mesut Ulutas
- Music by: Emrah Agdan
- Release date: 9 October 2012
- Running time: 80 minutes
- Country: Turkey
- Language: Turkish

Particle (Turkish: Zerre) is a 2012 Turkish drama film written and directed by Erdem Tepegöz. It was selected to compete in the main competition section of the 35th Moscow International Film Festival where it won the Golden George and Jale Arıkan won the Silver George for Best Actress.

== Plot ==
Zeynep lost her job at weaving factory, and her family - mother and handicapped daughter have no money for live. Zeynep tries to find new job in Istanbul.

== Cast ==
- Jale Arıkan as Zeynep
- Rüçhan Caliskur as Mother of Zeynep
- Özay Fecht as Seniha
- Remzi Pamukcu as Remzi
- Ergun Kuyucu as Kudret
- Dilay Demrok as Daughter of Zeynep
- Sencer Sagdiç as Chief
- Cemal Baykal as Mumtaz
- Mesude Turkmen as Ayse
- Suat Oktay Senocak as Doctor
