= Hop-Çiki-Yaya =

Turkish crime fiction novel series

Hop-Çiki-Yaya series
The Prophet Murders (2003)
The Kiss Murder (2003)
The Gigolo Murder (2003)
The Wig Murders

Hop-Çiki-Yaya (AKA: Turkish Delight Mystery) is the banner title of a series of crime fiction novels by Turkish author Mehmet Murat Somer published by İletişim Yayınları in Turkish and by Serpent's Tail and Penguin Books in English translation.

== Series synopsis ==
The series is set in Istanbul and features an unnamed transvestite amateur sleuth and Somer explains the title; "Hop-Çiki-Yaya was a cheerleading chant from Turkish colleges in the early 1960s, and it came to be used in comedy shows to mean gays. If somebody was queenish, then they'd say 'Oh, he's Hop-Çiki-Yaya'. By the 70s, it wasn't being used anymore - so I brought it back."

Regarding his inspiration for the series, Somer has stated that, "Not only in Turkey, but in many countries, transgender people are presented in a way that I don't like at all. They are either slapstick, half-brained characters to be laughed at, or people with no moral values. My aim with the books was to do what Pedro Almodóvar does - turn the negatives into positives." "I wanted to create a likeable, intelligent, witty, refined, well educated hero/heroine with 'positive skills'. Not the typical, stereotypical drag-queen. Therefore I furnished him/her with contrasting and considerable talents… Plus lots of knowledge and warm wit. Hence I created, I believe, the first transvestite detective."

== Novels ==
To date the series consists of seven novels (four of which have been published in English) although as Somer explains, "The order of the books is a strange story. I wrote The Kiss Murder first, but here in UK and in Turkey The Prophet Murders was published first. So, publishing wise, it is the first of the series." He also stated that, "As long as there will be readers and interest, I will produce more Hop-Ciki-Yayas."

=== The Prophet Murders ===
The Prophet Murders is the first published volume in the series.

"The Prophet Murders is a crime caper set in Istanbul. The hero is a transvestite detective. By day computer wizz, handsome man, corporate consultant and a skillful hacker; by night hip-underground club owner, glamorous and sexy transvestite, amateur sleuth with an Audrey Hepburn alter-ego." - M.M. Somer

- Somer, Mehmet Murat (May 8, 2008). The Prophet Murders. Serpent's Tail (paperback). ISBN 978-1-84668-633-7.

=== The Kiss Murder ===
The Kiss Murder is the second published volume in the series.

"A lady-like transvestite named Buse (i.e. Kiss in Turkish) is murdered. My hero tries to solve the case. Radical nationalists and their political party is in the background. You can expect more joy, more fun, more giggles and a page turner like The Prophet Murders." - M.M. Somer

- Somer, Mehmet Murat (February 12, 2009). The Kiss Murder. Serpent's Tail (paperback). ISBN 978-1-84668-693-1.
- Somer, Mehmet Murat (January 13, 2009). The Kiss Murder. Penguin Books (paperback). ISBN 978-0-14-311472-7.

=== The Gigolo Murder ===
The Gigolo Murder is the third published volume in the series.

- Somer, Mehmet Murat (August 27, 2009). The Gigolo Murder. Serpent's Tail (paperback). ISBN 978-1-84668-694-8.
- Somer, Mehmet Murat (September 29, 2009). The Gigolo Murder. Penguin Books (paperback). ISBN 978-0-14-311629-5.

=== The Wig Murder ===
The Wig Murders (AKA: The Serenity Murders) is the fourth published volume in the series.

- Somer, Mehmet Murat (December 25, 2012). The Serenity Murders. Penguin Books (paperback). ISBN 978-0143121220.
- Somer, Mehmet Murat (July 3, 2014). The Wig Murders. Serpent's Tail (paperback). ISBN 978-1846686955.
