= Back in Crime =

2013 film

- Directed by: Germinal Alvarez
- Written by: Germinal Alvarez; Nathalie Saugeon
- Starring: Jean-Hugues Anglade
- Cinematography: Vincent Mathias
- Music by: Evgueni Galperine, Sacha Galperine
- Release date: 6 April 2013
- Running time: 102 minutes
- Country: France
- Language: French
- Budget: $3.3 million
- Box office: $152,000

Back in Crime (French: L'Autre Vie de Richard Kemp) is a 2013 French crime film directed by Germinal Alvarez. It competed in the main competition section of the 35th Moscow International Film Festival.

== Plot ==
A murder victim is found near a river by Hélène Batistelli (Mélanie Thierry), a psychiatrist. Richard Kemp (Jean-Hugues Anglade), a French Police Captain, investigates the murder, and discovers it is similar to those in a serial-killer case he worked on in the beginning of his career. Kemp is attacked by an unknown assailant, thrown into the river, returns to land, and finds he is twenty years (1989) in the past, just before the murders begin. Kemp attempts to prevent the murders but becomes the main suspect only to find help from a younger Hélène.

== Cast ==
- Jean-Hugues Anglade as Richard Kemp
- Mélanie Thierry as Hélène Batistelli
- Philippe Berodot as Verbeck
- Jean-Henri Compère as Simon Rouannec
- Pierre Moure as Xavier
- Loïc Rojouan as Marseglia
- Frédéric Saurel as Pierrot (as Fred Saurel)
- Nicolas Villemagne as Perce-Oreille
- Adrien Cauchetier as François
- Flor Lurienne as Hôtesse aquarium
- Elsa Galles as Jeanne

== Production ==
The film was shot in Bordeaux, particularly in the city's Mériadeck district. Filming also took place at the port of La Rochelle and in an abandoned hospital in Rochefort, Charente-Maritime. La Rochelle's La Pallice submarine base and the Île de Ré bridge can be seen in the film.

== See also ==
- List of films featuring time loops
