= The Kids from the Port =

2013 film

- Directed by: Alberto Morais
- Written by: Ignacio Gutiérrez-Solana; Alberto Morais
- Produced by: Alberto Morais
- Starring: Omar Krim
- Cinematography: Bet Rourich
- Release date: June 2013 (Moscow)
- Running time: 78 minutes
- Country: Spain
- Language: Spanish

The Kids from the Port (Spanish: Los Chicos Del Puerto) is a 2013 Spanish drama film directed by Alberto Morais. It competed in the main competition section of the 35th Moscow International Film Festival. It was screened in the Contemporary World Cinema section at the 2013 Toronto International Film Festival.

== Cast ==
- José Luis de Madariaga as Miguel's Grandfather
- Sergio Caballero as Barman
- Omar Krim as Miguel
- Mikel Sarasa as Guillermo
- Blanca Bautista as Lola
