= The Black Land =

- Film poster
- Catalan: La terra negra
- Directed by: Alberto Morais
- Screenplay by: Alberto Morais; Samuel del Amor
- Produced by: Alberto Morais
- Starring: Laia Marull; Sergi López; Andrés Gertrúdix; Abdelatif Hwidar; Rosana Pastor; Álvaro Báguena; Toni Miso; Bruno Tamarit; María Albiñana
- Cinematography: Roberto San Eugenio
- Edited by: Julia Juániz
- Production companies: Olivo Films; Elamedia Estudios; Dexiderius P.A.; Garra Producciones
- Distributed by: Syldavia Cinema
- Release dates: 17 March 2025 (Málaga); 29 August 2025 (Spain)
- Running time: 97 minutes
- Countries: Spain; Panama
- Language: Catalan

The Black Land (Catalan: La terra negra) is a 2025 rural drama film directed by Alberto Morais starring Laia Marull and Sergi López. It is a Spanish-Panamanian co-production.

The film world premiered at the 28th Málaga Film Festival on 17 March 2025.

== Plot ==
Siblings María and Ángel run a mill business in a small village in the Valencian countryside, hiring former immate Miquel for help. Miquel develops a complex relationship with María while raising suspicions from the folks.

== Cast ==
- Laia Marull as Maria
- Sergi López as Miquel
- Andrés Gertrúdix as Ángel
- Abdelatif Hwidar
- Rosana Pastor
- Álvaro Báguena
- Toni Miso
- Bruno Tamarit
- María Albiñana

== Production ==
Morais emphasized the mystical side of the story and acknowledged the influence of Pier Paolo Passolini's neorealism. The film was produced by Olivo Films alongside Elamedia Estudios, Dexiderius P.A., and Garra Producciones. Shooting locations in the province of Valencia included Llíria. Both Marull and López had to work in the local Valencian accent, although, according to Marull, it was harder for her than for López.

== Release ==
The film was presented in the official selection of the 28th Málaga Film Festival on 17 March 2025. Its festival run also included selections for screenings at the 41st Chicago Latino Film Festival (for its North-American premiere) and the 40th Cinema Jove. Distributed by Syldavia Cinema, the film was set to be the film theatrically in Spain on 29 August 2025.

== Reception ==
Alfonso Rivera of Cineuropa described the film as a "unique experience for those seeking something different, as well as challenging for viewers unaccustomed to more radically auteur cinema".

== See also ==
- List of Spanish films of 2025
