= Jean-Hugues Anglade =

French actor

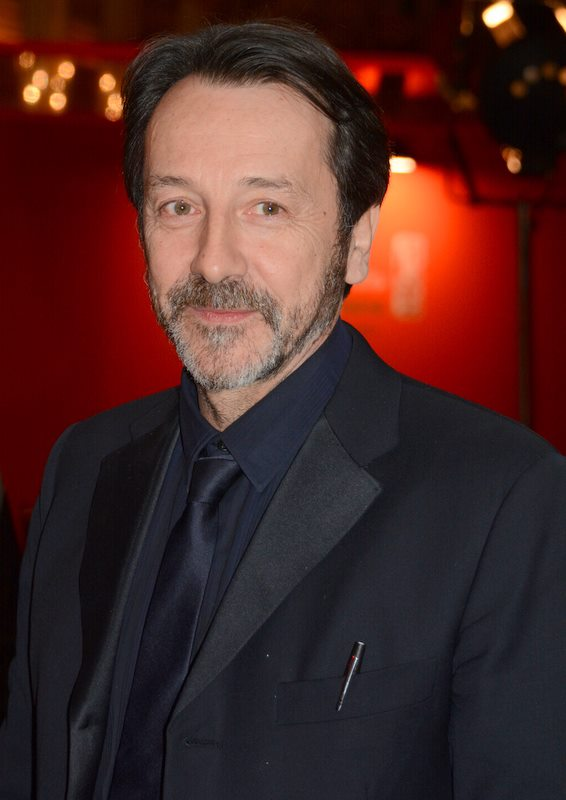
- Anglade at the César Awards 2014
- Born: 29 July 1955 (age 71); Thouars, Nouvelle-Aquitaine, France
- Education: Conservatoire national supérieur d'art dramatique
- Occupations: Actor, film director, screenwriter
- Years active: 1977–present
- Awards: See list

Jean-Hugues Anglade (French: [ʒɑ̃ yɡ ãɡlad]; born 29 July 1955) is a French actor, film director, and screenwriter. He has been twice nominated for the César Award for Best Actor, for Betty Blue (1986) and Nocturne Indien (1990), and won Best Supporting Actor for La Reine Margot (1994). In 2010, he was ascended a Commander of the Order of Arts and Letters.

== Early life ==
Jean-Hugues Anglade was born in Thouars, Deux-Sèvres, Poitou-Charentes, France. His father was a veterinary surgeon and his mother was a social worker. He entered the Conservatoire national supérieur d'art dramatique in Paris (class of 1980), where he attended classes with Antoine Vitez. This allowed him, in particular, to make his first appearance on television in 1980 in an adaptation by Michel Favart of La Peau de chagrin by Honoré de Balzac.

== Career ==
Anglade has acted in many films, TV series and on stage.

He plays a major role in the TF1 2022 French TV series Visions, which premiered at Canneseries that year. The series, directed by directed by Akim Isker, also stars Louane Emera, Soufiane Guerrab, and Julien Boisselier.

In 2010, he was ascended a Commander of the Order of Arts and Letters.

== Personal life ==
Anglade was married, from 1996 to 2000, to Mauritian actress Pamela Soo. He is the father of two sons, born in 2001 and 2002, from his union with Mali Lecomte.

On the 21st of August 2015, Anglade was a passenger on board the Paris-bound Thalys train that suffered an attempted attack. However, the assailant was subdued by other passengers. The event resulted in injuries to four passengers, including Anglade. He cut his hand while breaking the glass on the emergency alarm.

== Filmography ==
=== Film ===
Year	Title	Role	Director	Notes
1982	L'indiscrétion	Jean-François	Pierre Lary	
1982	Le mur blanc	The Man	Antoine Lacomblez	Short
1983	The Wounded Man	Henri	Patrice Chéreau	
1984	Dangerous Moves	Miller	Richard Dembo	
1985	Subway	The Roller	Luc Besson	
1985	Among Wolves	Richard Avakian	José Giovanni	
1986	Betty Blue	Zorg	Jean-Jacques Beineix	
1987	Malady of Love	Clément Potrel	Jacques Deray	
1989	Nocturne Indien	Rossignol / Xavier	Alain Corneau	
1990	Nikita	Marco	Luc Besson	
1990	Nuit d'été en ville	Louis	Michel Deville	
1991	Especially on Sunday	Biker Birds	Francesco Barilli	
1991	Gawin	Nicolas / Gawin	Arnaud Sélignac	
1993	Killing Zoe	Eric	Roger Avary	
1993	Jonah Who Lived in the Whale	The Father	Roberto Faenza	
1993	Les marmottes	Stéphane	Élie Chouraqui	
1994	La Reine Margot	Charles IX	Patrice Chéreau	
1994	Léon: The Professional	Drug Client	Luc Besson	Uncredited cameo
1995	Nelly and Mr. Arnaud	Vincent Granec	Claude Sautet	
1995	Dis-moi oui...	Stéphane	Alexandre Arcady	
1996	The Elective Affinities	Edoardo	Paolo and Vittorio Taviani	
1996	Maximum Risk	Sebastien	Ringo Lam	
1996	The Liars	Zac	Élie Chouraqui	
1997	Tonka	The Sprinter	Himself	Also director & writer
2000	Dark Summer	Gerard Huxley	Gregory Marquette	
2000	Princesses	Simon	Sylvie Verheyde	
2000	Le prof	Alexandre	Alexandre Jardin	
2000	En face	Jean	Mathias Ledoux	
2000	Champollion, un scribe pour l'Égypte	Voice-over	Jean-Claude Lubtchansky	Documentary
2001	Mortel Transfert	Michel Durand	Jean-Jacques Beineix	
2002	The Best Day of My Life	Davide	Cristina Comencini	
2002	Sueurs	Harvey	Louis-Pascal Couvelaire	
2003	It's Easier for a Camel...	Pierre	Valeria Bruni Tedeschi	
2003	Leave Your Hands on My Hips	Jérôme	Chantal Lauby	
2004	Taking Lives	Inspector Emil Duval	D. J. Caruso	
2005	L'anniversaire	Alberto	Diane Kurys	
2007	Shake Hands with the Devil	Bernard Kouchner	Roger Spottiswoode	
2007	Fata Morgana	The Stranger	Simon Groß	
2007	La face cachée	Xavier	Bernard Campan	
2008	Borderline	Tcheky	Lyne Charlebois	
2008	Il prossimo tuo	Jean-Paul	Anne Riitta Ciccone	
2008	Shanghai 1976	Paul Xu	Xueyang Hu	
2009	Villa Amalia	Georges	Benoît Jacquot	
2009	Persécution	The Madman	Patrice Chéreau	
2010	Dans ton sommeil	Sarah's Husband	Caroline & Éric du Potet	
2011	Le marquis	Jo	Dominique Farrugia	
2011	Mineurs 27	Captain Descharnes	Tristan Aurouet	
2012	Amitiés sincères	Paul	François Prévôt-Leygonie; Stéphan Archinard	
2013	Back in Crime	Richard Kemp	Germinal Alvarez	
2014	The Ninth Cloud	Jonny	Jane Spencer	
2015	Suburra	Cardinal Berchet	Stefano Sollima	
2015	I Am a Soldier	Henri	Laurent Larivière	
2015	Cafard	Victor	Jan Bultheel	
2017	The Velvet Gentleman	Erik Satie	Jane Spencer	
2018	Le Grand Bain (Sink or Swim)	Simon	Gilles Lellouche	
2021	Super-héros malgré lui	Michel Dugimont	Philippe Lacheau	

=== Television ===
Year	Title	Role	Notes
1977	Un comique né		TV film
1980	La peau de chagrin		TV film
1980	La colombe du Luxembourg		TV film
1981	La randonnée	Jean-Marc	TV film
1981	Les amours des années grises	Hervé Le Brézec	1 episode
1983	Par ordre du Roy	Lecocq	TV film
1983	Messieurs les jurés	Gaël Crozet	1 episode
2002	The Sopranos	Jean-Philippe Colbert	Episode: "Everybody Hurts"
2005	Under the Dark Sun of Africa	Gordon Coburn	TV film
2006	Gaspard le bandit	Gaspard	TV film
2007	Myster Mocky présente		1 episode
2008	John Adams	Count of Vergennes	TV miniseries
2008	A.D. La guerre de l'ombre	Prosecutor Mattéi	TV miniseries
2008–10	Collection Fred Vargas	Jean-Baptiste Adamsberg	4 episodes
2009	La double inconstance	The Prince	TV film
2009–16	Braquo	Eddy Caplan	28 episodes
2011	La mauvaise rencontre	Loup	TV film
2011	Amoureuse	Martial Verdier	TV film
2011	Rani	Philippe de Valcourt	6 Episodes
2014	Les trois silences	Philippe	TV film
2014	Le passager	Mathias Freire	TV miniseries
2016	Dans l'ombre du tueur	Prefect	TV miniseries
2018	Versailles	Man in the Iron Mask	3 episodes
2025	Hotel Costiera	Laurent	

== Theatre ==
Year	Title	Director	Venue
1977	Marie Tudor	Denise Chalem	CNSAD
1980	Berenice	Antoine Vitez	Théâtre Nanterre-Amandiers
1980	L'Illusion Comique	Pierre Romans	Théâtre de la Commune
1980	Scènes de chasse en Bavière	Himself	Espace Pierre Cardin
1984	Edward II	Himself	Théâtre Nanterre-Amandiers

== Awards and nominations ==
Institution	Year	Category	Work	Result
César Awards	1984	Most Promising Actor	The Wounded Man	Nominated
César Awards	1986	Best Supporting Actor	Subway	Nominated
César Awards	1987	Best Actor	Betty Blue	Nominated
César Awards	1990	Best Actor	Nocturne Indien	Nominated
César Awards	1995	Best Supporting Actor	La Reine Margot	Won
César Awards	1996	Best Supporting Actor	Nelly and Mr. Arnaud	Nominated
César Awards	2010	Best Supporting Actor	Persécution	Nominated
César Awards	2019	Best Supporting Actor	Sink or Swim	Nominated
Monte-Carlo TV Festival	2012	Outstanding Actor in a Drama Series	Braquo	Nominated
Prix Jean Gabin	1987	—N/a	—N/a	Won
