= Damsels in Distress (film) =

2011 film by Whit Stillman

- Theatrical release poster
- Directed by: Whit Stillman
- Written by: Whit Stillman
- Produced by: Martin Shafer; Liz Glotzer; Whit Stillman
- Starring: Greta Gerwig; Adam Brody; Lio Tipton (Note: Credited as Analeigh Tipton; Tipton came out as non-binary and changed their name in 2021.); Megalyn Echikunwoke; Carrie MacLemore; Hugo Becker; Ryan Metcalf; Billy Magnussen; Caitlin FitzGerald; Jermaine Crawford; Aubrey Plaza; Zach Woods; Taylor Nichols; Carolyn Farina
- Cinematography: Doug Emmett
- Edited by: Andrew Hafitz
- Music by: Mark Suozzo; Adam Schlesinger
- Production companies: Westerly Films; Steeplechase-Analytic
- Distributed by: Sony Pictures Classics
- Release dates: September 10, 2011 (Venice); April 6, 2012 (United States)
- Running time: 99 minutes
- Country: United States
- Language: English
- Budget: $3 million
- Box office: $1.3 million

Damsels in Distress is a 2011 American comedy-drama film written and directed by Whit Stillman and starring Greta Gerwig, Adam Brody, and Lio Tipton. It is set at a United States East Coast university. First screened at the 68th Venice International Film Festival and the Toronto International Film Festival, it opened in New York and Los Angeles on April 6, 2012.

== Plot ==
At Seven Oaks University, Lily, a transfer student, becomes roommates with Violet, Heather, and Rose, a clique who run the campus suicide prevention center. The center attempts to help suicidal and depressed students by giving them donuts and having them participate in tapdancing. On the way to a party, Violet, who is dating fellow student Frank, talks about how she seeks out less attractive men to help their confidence.

Violet comforts Priss after her boyfriend Josh breaks up with her, only for her to later make out with Frank. Violet clashes with Rick DeWolfe, the editor of the campus newspaper, The Daily Complainer. Violet considers DeWolfe arrogant, though Lily calls her out as a hypocrite for also being arrogant. Violet begins seeing Charlie Walker, whose real name is revealed to be Fred Packenstacker, but after seeing him dance with Lily, Violet leaves him be. The relationship between the two women becomes strained.

After a celebration of the Roman letter fraternities turns violent, all the fraternities get banned, much to the relief of DeWolfe, who hated them. Frank is able to have Violet accommodate the frat students at the suicide prevention center. Violet plans to help Doar Dorm, which has the highest fatality and worst hygiene rates, by distributing packets of soap, as she believes it affects the human psyche. Two of the students end up showering, much to the clique's delight. After Lily and Violet reconcile, Violet begins her own dance craze, the Sambola.

== Cast ==
- Greta Gerwig as "Violet Wister" (Emily Tweeter)
- Adam Brody as Fred Packenstacker / Charlie Walker
- Lio Tipton as Lily
- Carrie MacLemore as Heather
- Megalyn Echikunwoke as Rose
- Hugo Becker as Xavier
- Ryan Metcalf as Frank
- Billy Magnussen as Thor
- Caitlin FitzGerald as Priss
- Jermaine Crawford as Jimbo
- Aubrey Plaza as Depressed Debbie
- Zach Woods as Rick DeWolfe
- Taylor Nichols as Professor Black
- Carolyn Farina as Carolina Antonucci, diner waitress
- Alia Shawkat as Mad Madge
- Nick Blaemire as Freak Astaire
- Aja Naomi King as Positive Polly
- Meredith Hagner as Alice

== Development ==
Damsels in Distress was Stillman's first produced feature since The Last Days of Disco (1998). In August 1998, he had moved from New York to Paris with his wife and two daughters. In that time, he wrote a novelization of The Last Days of Disco and several screenplays that were not made, including one set in Jamaica in the 1960s. He resolved to make a lower-budget film in the style of his 1990 debut, Metropolitan. In 2006, he met with Liz Glotzer and Mart Shafer at Castle Rock Entertainment, who had financed his second and third films. According to Shafer:

Whit said, "I want to write a movie about four girls in a dorm who are trying to keep things civil in an uncivil world." It took him a year to write 23 pages. Six months later, a few more dribbled in. He just doesn't work very fast. Finally we had a draft. When we started production he said, "I think 12 years is the right amount of time between movies."

Castle Rock provided most of the $3 million budget.

== Production ==
The movie was filmed on location in New York City on Staten Island at the Sailors' Snug Harbor Cultural Center. Filming finished on November 5, 2010.

Stillman has said that the film was cut between its festival and theatrical runs:

I felt the MPAA helped us out there. I'd hoped to get a PG-13 even with the Venice cut, but in the first viewing they thought it was R. So we looked at it, the editor [Andrew Hafitz] and I, and we saw immediately some things that would make it pretty clearly PG-13, and we felt would help the movie. There could've been a little heaviness of talking a little too much about what was going on, and it would delay the laugh until later—which I think is always good. We were really happy with the small changes we made. We made tiny changes in two scenes: we took out the text for what the ALA stood for... I think it gave it a Lubitschean vagueness and delayed the laugh.

== Music ==
The film has an original score by Mark Suozzo. The song "Sambola!" is by Suozzo, Michael A. Levine, and Lou Christie.

== Reception ==
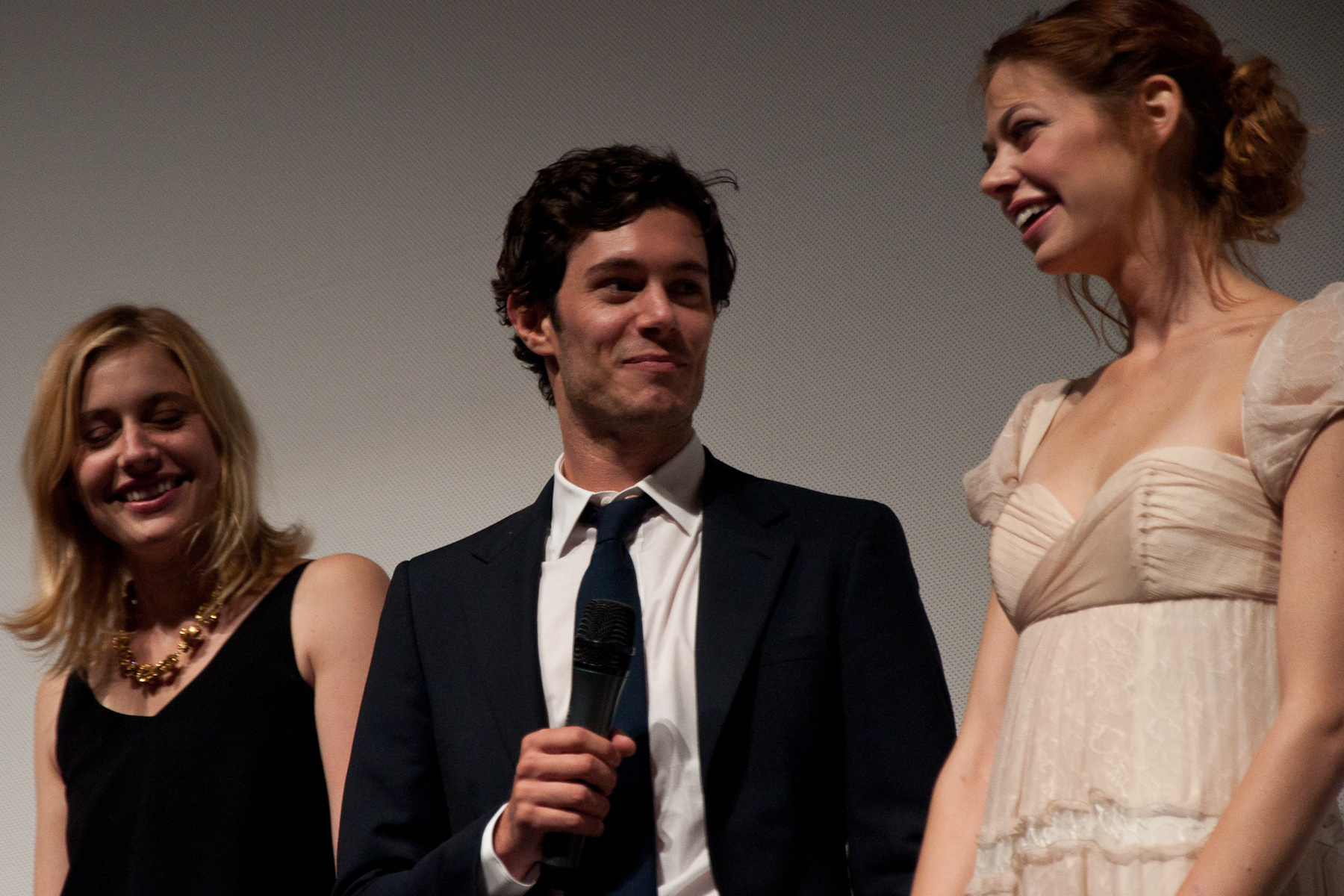
Greta Gerwig, Adam Brody, and Lio Tipton at the 2011 Toronto International Film Festival premiere of Damsels in Distress

On review aggregator Rotten Tomatoes, the film has an approval rating of 75% based on reviews from 143 critics. The website's critics consensus reads, "Damsels in Distress can sometimes feel mannered and outlandish, but it's redeemed by director Whit Stillman's oddball cleverness and Greta Gerwig's dryly funny performance." On Metacritic, it has a score of 67% based on reviews from 33 critics.

In Variety, Leslie Felperin wrote, "a film that raises laughs even with its end credits, Whit Stillman's whimsical campus comedy Damsels in Distress is an utter delight." In Time, Richard Corliss wrote, "Innocence deserted teen movies ages ago, but it makes a comeback, revived and romanticized, in this joyous anachronism." Andrew O'Hehir of Salon praised Gerwig's "powerful and complicated performance" and wrote, "it's both a relief and a delight to discover that Stillman remains one of the funniest writers in captivity." He concluded, "I laughed until I cried, and you may too (if you don't find it pointless and teeth-grindingly irritating). Either way, Whit Stillman is back at last, bringing his peculiar brand of counterprogramming refreshment to our jaded age." Jordan Hoffman of About.com gave the film four stars out of five, calling Gerwig "a massive, multi-faceted talent" and the film a "love it or hate it movie. Personally, I think the ones who aren't charmed to pieces by its endless banter and preposterous characters very much need our help to expand their tastes and accept a more enlightened purview of what, indeed, is refined and acceptable motion picture entertainment."
