= Turkish Film Critics Association =

- Abbreviation: SİYAD
- Formation: 1977; 48 years ago
- Merger of: International Federation of Film Critics
- Type: Film criticism
- Legal status: Active
- Location: Istanbul
- Official language: Turkish
- Website: www.siyad.org

Turkish Film Critics Association (Turkish: Sinema Yazarları Derneği or SİYAD) is a non-governmental organization based in Istanbul, founded in 1977 by film critic Atilla Dorsay. It distributes the annual Turkish Film Critics Association Awards and also a member of the International Federation of Film Critics.

== History ==
The Turkish Film Critics Association was founded in 1977 by film critic Atilla Dorsay. It was closed in 1980 after the 1980 Turkish coup d'état. SİYAD was re-established in 1993 by Saim Yavuz, Turgut Yasalar, Atilla Dorsay, Agah Özgüç, Vecdi Sayar, Kamil Suveren and Necati Sönmez. The association was headed by Atilla Dorsay until 2005, when Mehmet Açar was elected as the president. SİYAD later headed by the following film critics: Mehmet Açar (2005–07), Murat Özer (2007–10), Tunca Arslan (2010–13), Alin Taşçıyan (2013–14), Melis Behlil (2014–15) and Tulle Akbal-Süalp (2015).

== Purpose of the Association ==
The aim of SİYAD is to contribute to the development of the art of cinema in Turkey as a means of social communication and as a field of industry and commerce, to work for the protection of the unique artistic values and criteria of the art of cinema in all kinds of cinematic activities, and to strengthen the acceptance and presence of film writing and criticism as a profession in all written and visual media.

== Award ==
The award ceremonies take place in Istanbul, Turkey to honor the best Turkish films. The categories include:

- Best Film
- Best Director
- Mahmut Tali Award for Best Script
- Cahide Sonku Award for Best Actress
- Best Actor
- Best Supporting Actress
- Best Supporting Actor
- Best Cinematographer
- Best Music
- Best Editor
- Best Art Director
- Honorary Awards

== See also ==
- 43rd SİYAD Awards
- 44th SİYAD Awards
