= Electroboy (film) =

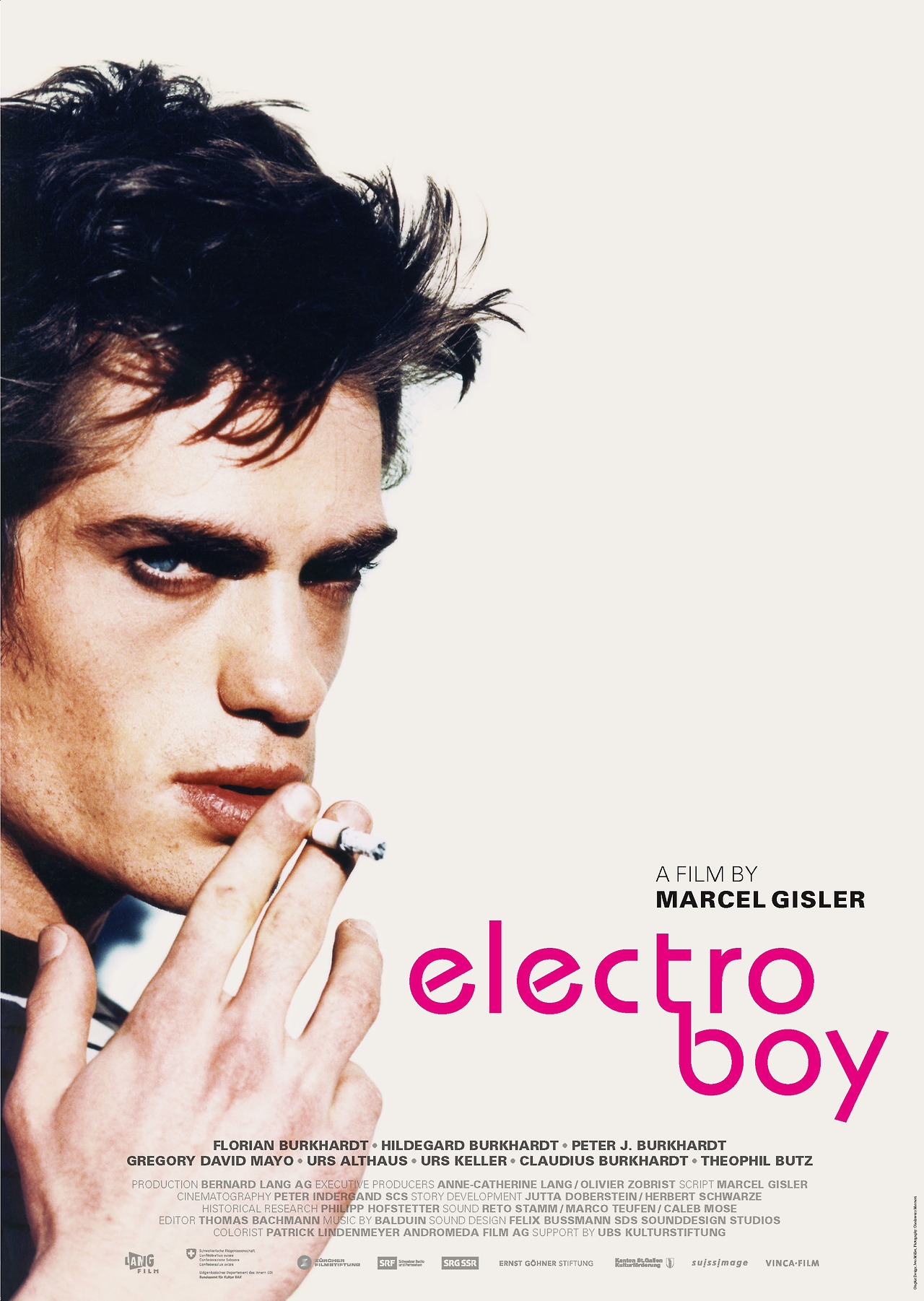
- Directed by: Marcel Gisler
- Written by: Marcel Gisler
- Produced by: Anne-Catherine Lang; Olivier Zobrist; Urs Augstburger
- Starring: Florian Burkhardt
- Cinematography: Peter Indergand
- Edited by: Thomas Bachmann
- Music by: Claudio (Balduin) Gianfreda
- Release date: August 2014
- Running time: 113 minutes
- Country: Switzerland
- Languages: English; Swiss German; German

Electroboy is a 2014 Swiss documentary film written and directed by Marcel Gisler. It is about Florian Burkhardt, known as Electroboy. The film won the Swiss Film Award for Best Documentary Film and Best Film Editing in 2015. It was also screened at festivals including Locarno and Solothurn.

== Synopsis ==
The documentary follows Florian Burkhardt, known as Electroboy, as he leaves his background behind in search of fame, recognition, and identity. Set during the 1990s, the film follows his search for a new sense of self after fear and disillusionment.

== Reception ==
=== Awards ===
The film won the Swiss Film Award for Best Documentary Film and Best Film Editing in 2015. It also won the Zürcher Filmpreis in 2014 and the Kino Kino Publikumspreis at DOK.fest München in 2015. Claudio (Balduin) Gianfreda was nominated for the Swiss Film Award for Best Film Score in 2015. The film was included in the European Film Awards documentary selection in 2015.

=== Critical response ===
The Hollywood Reporter described the film as “a fascinating look at a complex human being’s many up and downs” and wrote that it brings together Burkhardt’s accomplishments, reinventions, and personal struggles into a portrait of “an extremely complex human being”. Writing for Semaine de la critique at the Locarno Film Festival, Madeleine Hirsiger wrote that the film’s “excellently and densely edited portrait leads the spectator into an anxiety from which there is no escape”. Filmdienst praised the film as a strong documentary about Florian Burkhardt, highlighting its portrait of his repeated self-reinventions and its depiction of recurring cycles of success and failure. SRF praised it for its forceful structure and described it as more than a record of events.

== Festival screenings ==
The film had its world premiere in August 2014. It was later screened at festivals including the Locarno Film Festival in 2014, the Solothurn Film Festival in 2015, DOK.fest Munich in 2015, the Fünf Seen Filmfestival in 2015, Queersicht in 2015, and the Thessaloniki Documentary Festival in 2016.
