= Persécution =

- Promotional poster
- Directed by: Patrice Chéreau
- Written by: Patrice Chéreau; Anne-Louise Trividic
- Starring: Romain Duris; Charlotte Gainsbourg; Jean-Hugues Anglade; Hiam Abbass
- Cinematography: Yves Cape
- Edited by: François Gédigier
- Music by: Éric Neveux
- Distributed by: Mars Distribution
- Release dates: 5 September 2009 (Venice Film Festival); 9 December 2009 (France)
- Running time: 100 minutes
- Countries: France; Germany
- Language: French
- Box office: $1.7 million

Persécution is a 2009 romantic-drama film directed by Patrice Chéreau. It stars Romain Duris, Charlotte Gainsbourg and Jean-Hugues Anglade. It premiered on 5 September 2009 at the 66th Venice International Film Festival where it was nominated for the Golden Lion.

== Plot ==
Daniel, 35, is haunted by a stranger who regularly breaks into his house and spies on him. One day, the stranger, a seemingly harmless middle-aged man, confronts Daniel and tells him that he is the man of his life. Daniel is shocked by the admission and tells the stranger to stay away. Daniel has a girlfriend, Sonia, whom he persecutes yet also worships. Sonia prioritizes her career before her relationship with Daniel and ignores his needs.

== Cast ==
- Romain Duris as Daniel
- Charlotte Gainsbourg as Sonia
- Jean-Hugues Anglade as The madman
- Gilles Cohen as Michel
- Hiam Abbass as Marie
- Alex Descas as Thomas
- Tsilla Chelton as Old woman
- Corinne Masiero

== Reception ==
Ray Bennett of The Hollywood Reporter wrote, "Charismatic stars and the film's Gallic shrug of acceptance over the difficulties that being in love creates will take the film to festivals and art houses, but it's far from a classic".

== Award and nominations ==
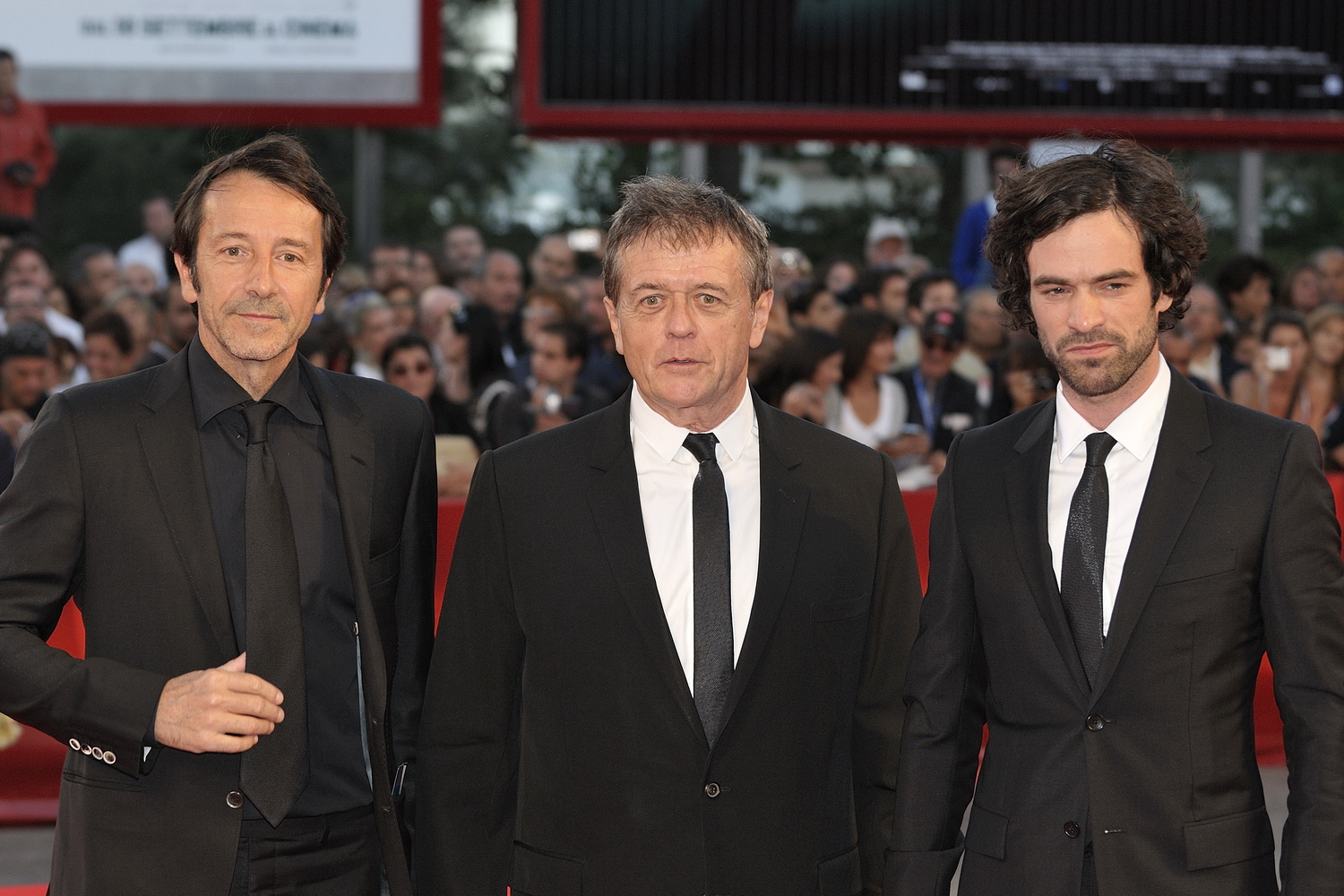
Anglade, Chéreau and Duris at the Venice Film Festival

Venice Film Festival

- Golden Lion - Patrice Chéreau (nomination)

César Awards

- César Award for Best Supporting Actor - Jean-Hugues Anglade (nomination)
