= Yozgat Blues =

Turkish comedy film

- Directed by: Mahmut Fazıl Coşkun
- Starring: Ercan Kesal; Ayça Damgacı
- Release date: 11 April 2013 (IIFF)
- Running time: 1h 33min
- Country: Turkey
- Language: Turkish

Yozgat Blues is a 2013 Turkish comedy film directed by Mahmut Fazıl Coşkun. The film won the Golden Boll Award for Best Picture.

== Plot ==
Yavuz (Ercan Kesal) teaches music at municipal courses in Istanbul. After his father's death he has to go to Yozgat, a small provincial town. Nese (Ayça Damgacı) joins him on this trip.

== Cast ==
- Ercan Kesal as Yavuz
- Ayça Damgacı as Nese
- Tansu Biçer as Sabri
- Nadir Sarıbacak as Kamil
