= Little Noises =

1991 comedy drama film by Jane Spencer

- DVD cover
- Directed by: Jane Spencer
- Written by: Jane Spencer; Jon Zeiderman
- Produced by: Brad M. Gilbert; Michael Spielberg
- Starring: Crispin Glover; Tatum O'Neal; Rik Mayall
- Cinematography: Makoto Watanabe
- Edited by: Ernie Fritz
- Music by: Kurt Hoffman; Fritz Van Orden
- Distributed by: Monument Pictures
- Release dates: January 1991 (Sundance); April 24, 1992 (United States)
- Running time: 73 minutes
- Language: English

Little Noises is a 1991 comedy drama film directed by Jane Spencer. The film stars Crispin Glover as an awkward, unsuccessful writer who achieves fame after stealing the poetry of a deaf man. It premiered at the 1991 Sundance Film Festival and was given a limited theatrical release by Monument Pictures on April 24, 1992.

== Plot ==
Joey is an awkward young man who aspires to be a novelist but has written nothing of note and longs more for the fame that comes with literary success. Seeking to impress Stella, the woman of his dreams, whose play has been accepted for production in London, Joey steals the poetry of his deaf friend Marty and passes it off as his own. Joey succeeds in his theft and manages to sign with literary agent Mathias. However, this comes at the cost of Marty's own happiness and the man falls into a deep depression and loses his home. Fame quickly goes to Joey's head and he eventually alienates his friends and Stella with his behavior.

== Cast ==
- Crispin Glover as Joey Kremple
- Tatum O'Neal as Stella Winslow
- Rik Mayall as Mathias Liechtenstein
- Steven Schub as Timmy Smith
- Matthew Hutton as Marty
- John C. McGinley as Stu
- Nina Siemaszko as Dolores
- Tate Donovan as Elliott
- Gianin Loffler as Wayne Wacker
- Cathy Haase as Eve
- Carole Shelley as Aunt Shirley
- Carolyn Farina as Linny
- Barry Papick as Bud

== Release ==
Little Noises premiered at the 1991 Sundance Film Festival in the main competition. It also was screened in competition at Goteborg Film Festival in Sweden, and at the Wine Valley Festival in California.

Little Noises was initially intended to be released direct-to-video but was given a theatrical release by Monument Pictures beginning on April 24, 1992, in the United States.

== Reception ==
The Los Angeles Times gave the film a mostly positive review, noting that while it had "a few flaws" the film was ultimately "a promising debut film filled with talent and feeling", calling Glover's performance "virtuosic". Marc Savlov of The Austin Chronicle commended the film, saying Spencer creates a "moving and literate fable that explores the dangerous waters of artistic self-delusion, and the consequences of literary theft." He wrote, "Spencer's film is a brilliant 'little' foray into the bittersweet world of the hopeless and the disillusioned. Little Noises is filled to bursting with wonderfully detailed characterizations, and although we've seen this stuttering, nervous, absent-minded portrayal from Glover before, it's no less fresh in this context. Mayall's obscenely pompous literary agent is likewise excellent and actually does add a touch of humor to what might otherwise have been a seriously downbeat film. This is a superbly crafted film that points out a few truths we may recognize as buried within ourselves, and as such, it also works as a charming cautionary tale regarding the pros and cons of dreaming and doing."

TV Guide wrote the film "does offer reflections on the artistic process and selling out", but said "unfortunately, these and other promising themes (the conflict between artistic expression and the desire to have that expression garner approval from society; the plight of the struggling writer in an unsubsidized landscape; and the process by which some shed friends as they climb the ladder of success) are handled too blatantly".

Dave Kehr of the Chicago Tribune commented that while he enjoyed Glover's performance, the film "drifts through a number of ill-defined, unnecessary sequences-including scenes involving Nina Siemaszko as a pretty girl with a crush on Joey, and John C. McGinley as the true poet's drug-dealing brother-before it arrives at its surprisingly bleak conclusion." Kehr added, "Glover's character is [largely played] for pathos, and it isn't much fun feeling sorry for him. He's better, and more dangerous, than that." He concluded the film does not "bring a strong point of view to the material, so it's often hard to tell whether we're meant to find Joey sweet and appealing or creepy and clinically disturbed." Lloyd Sachs of the Chicago Sun-Times wrote a mostly negative review, stating that while he felt the film had some highlights, its subplot was "pretentious" and "overreaching". Others lamented the relatively little screen time for O'Neal.
