= Ayça Damgacı =

Turkish actress (born 1973)

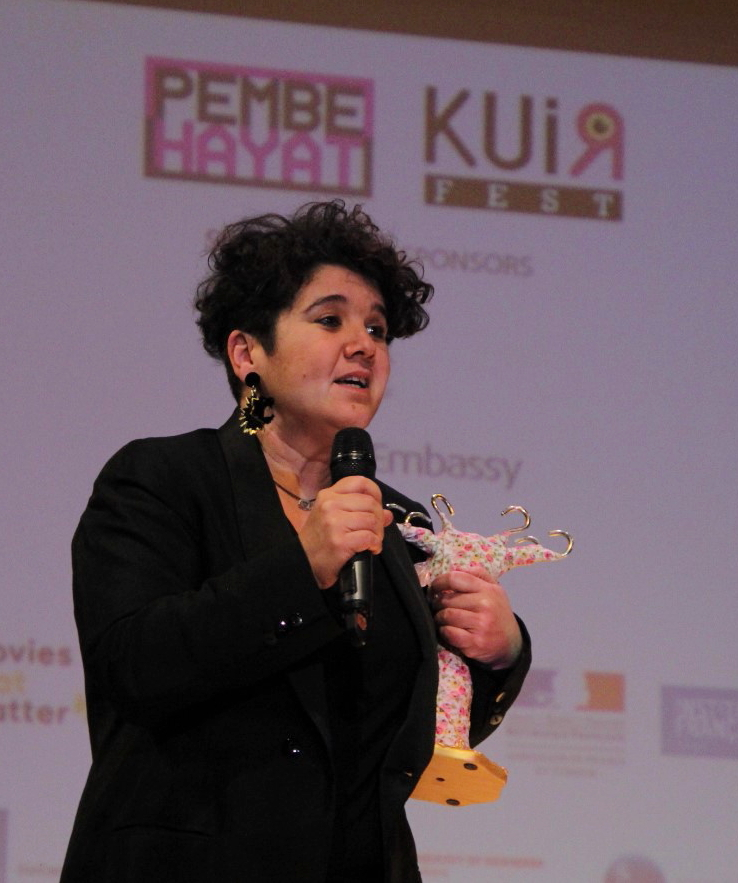
- Born: 29 July 1973 (age 52); Istanbul, Turkey
- Occupation: Actress

Ayça Damgacı (born 29 July 1973) is a Turkish actress. She is best known for her role in the 2008 movie My Marlon and Brando , which earned her the Best Actress award at the Sarajevo Film Festival.

She initially planned on studying economics but later became interested in acting. She first took acting lessons at the Şahika Tekand Acting and Art Studio, before graduating from Istanbul University School of Literature with a degree in theatre studies. She then joined Tiyatro Oyunevi as a cast member. Damgacı also worked as a soloist for the band Göçebe Şarkılar. Between 2013 and 2015, she had a recurring role in Star TV's Aramızda Kalsın series as Hatçik. Between 2015 and 2016, she was among the casr of O Hayat Benim. Since 2018, she has been portraying the character of Hasret in the series Avlu, which later became available for streaming on Netflix.

== Filmography ==
- My Marlon and Brando (2008; film)
- Ay Lav Yu (2010; film)
- Yozgat Blues (2013; film)
- Aramızda Kalsın (2013–2015; TV series)
- O Hayat Benim (2015–2016; TV series)
- Avlu (2018–; TV series)

== Theatre ==
- Yala Ama Yutma!
- Beklerken
- İstanbul'da Bir Dava
- Dillerde Günahkar
- Döne Döne
- Unutmak
- Ormanların Hemen Önündeki Gece
- Evlenme
- Ceza Kolonisinde
- Bebek Fil
- Biraz Sen, Biraz Ben

== Awards ==
- 27th International Istanbul Film Festival - Gitmek, Best Actress
- 15th Golden Boll Film Festival - Gitmek, Best Actress (shared with Selen Uçer)
- 14th Sarajevo Film Festival, Gitmek, Best Actress
- 14th Turkey/Germany Film Festival Nurnberg, Gitmek, Best Actress
