= Haze (2010 film) =

- Theatrical Poster
- Directed by: Tayfun Pirselimoğlu
- Written by: Tayfun Pirselimoğlu
- Produced by: Tayfun Pirselimoğlu; Rena Wougıdukalou; Aikaterini Oikonomou; Veysel Ipek
- Starring: Ruhi Sarı; Nurcan Ülger; Mehmet Avcı; Bahar Yanılmaz; Birol Engeler; Serkan Keskin
- Cinematography: Ercan Özkan
- Edited by: Erdinç Özyurt
- Music by: Cengiz Onural
- Production company: Zuzi Film
- Distributed by: Tiglon Film
- Release date: May 28, 2010
- Running time: 108 minutes
- Country: Turkey
- Language: Turkish

Haze (Turkish: Pus) is a 2010 Turkish drama film, directed by Tayfun Pirselimoğlu, starring Ruhi Sarı as a withdrawn young man who gets caught up with a shadowy criminal plot. The film, which went on nationwide general release across Turkey on May 28, 2010, premiered at the 60th Berlin International Film Festival (February 11–21, 2010).

== Plot ==
Reşat, a withdrawn and asocial young man who works at a pirate DVD shop, represses his feelings for the girl next door, and adds excitement to his life with petty theft. The film turns into a thriller when the shadowy Celal, a friend of Reşat's boss, gets shot just after he leaves a package in the shop and Reşat has to make sense of the photo and the gun it contains.

== Review ==
Hürriyet Daily News reviewer Emrah Güler describes the film as, "a story of people living on the edge," and recommends it to those, "who have enjoyed director and writer Pirselimoğlu’s human stories both on screen and in published novels," but not to those, "wanting to see an uplifting and entertaining movie on the weekend."

== See also ==
- 2010 in film
- Turkish films of 2010
