= Kerr (film) =

2021 Turkish drama thriller film

- Theatrical release poster
- Original title: tr
- Directed by: Tayfun Pirselimoğlu
- Written by: Tayfun Pirselimoğlu
- Produced by: Vildan Erşen
- Starring: Erdem Şenocak; Jale Arıkan; Rıza Akın
- Cinematography: Andreas Sinanos
- Edited by: Ali Agha
- Music by: Nikos Kypourgos
- Production companies: Gataki Movie; Bad Crowd; Arizona Films Productions
- Distributed by: Another Cinema
- Release dates: October 2021 (AGOFF); 22 April 2022 (Turkey)
- Running time: 100 minutes
- Countries: Turkey; Greece; France
- Language: Turkish
- Box office: ₺121,091

Kerr is a 2021 Turkish-language thriller drama film written and directed by Tayfun Pirselimoğlu. The film based on his eponymous novel, follows Can, who witnessed a murder in the village for his father's funeral. It had its premiere in October 2021 at the 58th Antalya Golden Orange Film Festival.

It was selected as the Turkish entry for the Best International Feature Film at the 95th Academy Awards, but was not nominated.

== Plot ==
Can is stranded in the town where his father had a tailor shop. He came to attend his funeral but witnessed a murder at the station's men's room. Can alerted the police, however, the police, the coastal town officials and citizens, seemed more interested in his whereabouts and reason for visiting than investigating the crime. The situation became worse when the town is put under strict quarantine due to a rabies outbreak caused by dogs attacking and killing people. Over the top Can gets falsely accused of something. The absurdity of the situation, reminiscent of Franz Kafka's The Trial, is further compounded by other peculiarities: the house Can inherited leaks, his father's old car won't start but gets stolen, and the only woman in town (Jale Arıkan), poses philosophical questions and answers simple ones with even more philosophical counter-questions.

== Cast ==
- Erdem Şenocak as Can
- Jale Arıkan as the only woman in town
- Rıza Akın
- Gafur Uzuner
- Ali Seçkiner
- Melih Düzenli
- Sinan Bengier
- Muttalip Müjdeci
- Hakki Kurtulus
- Tansu Biçer as funeral service

== Release ==
Kerr competed in the 58th Antalya Golden Orange Film Festival held from 2 October to 9 October 2021, where it won Golden Orange Best Director Award as well as FİLM-YÖN (Film Directors’ Association) Best Director Award, and Best Music Award. It also competed in 37th edition of Warsaw International Film Festival in the 'International Competition' section held from 8 to 17 October 2021.

In 2022, it was selected in the 41st International Istanbul Film Festival and was screened on 18 April.

The film was also selected in 'Non Premiere Feature Films' section at the 38th edition of the Santa Barbara International Film Festival held from 8 February to 18 February 2023. It was also screened at the Belgrade International Film Festival on 3 March 2023.

== Reception ==
=== Critical response ===
Marko Stojiljković reviewing for Asian Movie Pulse wrote, "All things considered, Kerr is a film on the verge of the masterpiece, a rich tapestry of the very well known and the eye-opening details, connections, references, metaphors and symbols." Stojiljković added, "It is a hell of a ride and something that simply has to be experienced." Kino Avant-Garde giving a positive review rated the film 4/5 and praised the direction, cinematography and editing of the film. They wrote, "the director and the cinematographer should definitely be congratulated for the mise-en-scene and cinematography; frames, horizontal-vertical elements, perspective, light, camera angles, each one is admirable." Praising editor they said, "a masterpiece of editing technique; With the transition from the car radio to the radio station with a sound bridge, he bids us farewell from the subconscious and from the movie, it’s only the music that remains."

=== Awards and nominations ===
The film was nominated for Greek Minority Co-Production Award at the Hellenic Film Academy Awards in 2023.

Award	Date of ceremony	Category	Recipient(s)	Result	Ref.
Warsaw Film Festival	8 October 2021	Best Film	Kerr	Nominated	
Antalya Golden Orange Film Festival	9 October 2021	Best Director	Tayfun Pirselimoğlu	Won	
Antalya Golden Orange Film Festival	9 October 2021	Best Music	Nikos Kypourgos	Won	
Antalya Golden Orange Film Festival	9 October 2021	Turkish Film Directors’ Ass. Award	Tayfun Pirselimoğlu	Won	
International Istanbul Film Festival	19 April 2022	Best Director	Tayfun Pirselimoğlu	Won	
International Istanbul Film Festival	19 April 2022	Best Art Director	Natali Yeres	Won	
Asian World Film Festival	13 November 2022	Best Feature Cinematography	Andreas Sinanos	Won	

== See also ==
- List of submissions to the 95th Academy Awards for Best International Feature Film
- List of Turkish submissions for the Academy Award for Best International Feature Film
