= Mircan Kaia =

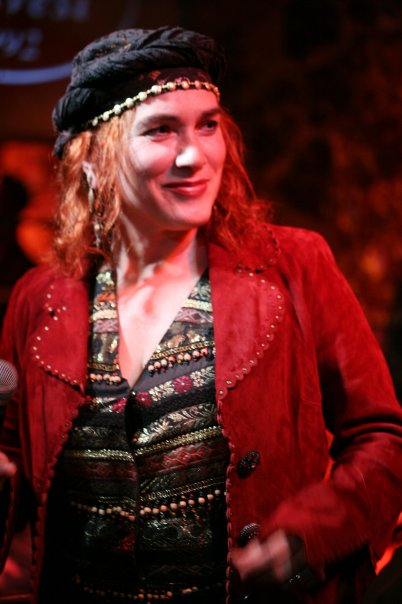

Background information
- Born: 1963 (age 62–63); Artvin, Turkey
- Genres: World, folk, jazz
- Occupations: Engineer, songwriter, music composer, producer
- Instruments: Vocals, guitar
- Labels: UCM Productions, Kalan, Çan Music
- Website: www.mircankaiamusic.com

Mircan Kaia, alternate spelling Mircan Kaya, is a Turkish singer/songwriter and engineer.

== Early life and education ==
Kaia was born in 1963 in Artvin, a town in the Black Sea Region in north-eastern Turkey. Her grandparents were Mingrelians who converted to Islam and had moved to the region from Batumi in Georgia. When Kaia was nine years old, her family moved to Istanbul. She had been interested in singing from an early age, and in Istanbul she started taking guitar lessons.

When Kaia was 13, her 26-year-old brother died. He had been an engineer, and she decided to study engineering at university. She has a degree in civil engineering from Yıldız Technical University, an MSc in earthquake engineering from Boğaziçi University, and an advanced MSc degree in the structural analysis of historic constructions, for which she received a European Commission Scholarship. For her advanced degree, she carried out research work at the University of Padua, the Technical University of Catalonia, the University of Minho, and the Czech Technical University in Prague. She has also studied music theory in England.

== Career ==
=== Music ===
Kaia released her first two albums, Bizim Ninniler (Our Lullabies) and Kül (Ashes), in 2005. In 2006 when she had recorded her next album Sâlâ, she founded the production company UCM Productions.

Sâlâ was reviewed by Chris Williams for FROOTS magazine. For her next album, Numinosum, Kaia wrote the lyrics and incorporated poetry by the 13th century scholar Rumi. The album was recorded in Bristol, UK, with the avant-jazz group Limbo.

For her 2008 album OUTIM – Once Upon a Time in Mingrelia she used her own lyrics together with poetry by the Mingrelian poet Xhelimishi Xasani. She has also released other albums with lyrics in Mingrelian, Laz, and other minority languages, including the lullaby collections Bizim Ninniler from 2005 and Nanni and Minor from 2012. She set several poems by Gülten Akın to music for her album Elixir, which was released in 2010.

She produced the music for the 2010 drama film White as Snow directed by Selim Güneş. The score includes songs from her albums "Sâlâ, Outim, Numinosum, and Kül, as well as music she composed for the film. She received the Best film music award at the 47th Antalya Golden Orange Film Festival and at the 44th SİYAD Awards, for her music in White as Snow. In 2014, she scored the music to the short film The Chocolate Wrapper directed by Murat Kebir.

=== Engineering ===
Kaia is an engineer, working with structural design and earthquake protection technology.

She is a founding member of the Turkish Association of Seismic Isolation, and was President of the association in 2012.

== Discography ==
- Bizim Ninniler, 2005, Çan Music
- Kül, 2005, Kalan Music
- Kül & Ashes, 2006, UCM Productions (re-release of Kül)
- Sâlâ, 2006, UCM Productions
- Numinosum, 2007, UCM Productions
- OUTIM (Once Upon a Time in Mingrelia), 2008, UCM Productions
- Elixir, 2010, UCM Productions
- Nanni, 2012, UCM Productions
- Minor, 2012, UCM Productions
- Insula, 2018, UCM Productions
- Kırmızı Gül, 2018, UCM Productions
- Hush, 2018, UCM Productions
- Tatlı Dilli / Sweet Talker, 2019, UCM Productions
- Sevemem Seni Eskisi Gibi, 2020, UCM Productions
