= Mehmet Murat Somer =

Turkish author of crime fiction (born 1959)

- Born: 1959; Ankara, Turkey
- Occupation: Author
- Writing career
- Period: 2001 – present
- Genre: Crime fiction
- Notable work: Hop-Çiki-Yaya series

Mehmet Murat Somer (born 1959) is a Turkish author of crime fiction best known for his Hop-Çiki-Yaya series set in Istanbul and featuring an unnamed transvestite amateur detective.

== Biography ==
Somer was born in Ankara but moved to Istanbul in 1982, after graduating from technical university, and worked as an engineer for Sony, an experience he draws on in his writing. "I don't call upon the muses," he states, "I write more with my logic - my engineering side." He went on to become a manager for Citibank and he also calls upon this experience in his writing. "When I'm writing a novel, " he says, "I think about the speed, make the necessary calculations for which character should be seen when, and balance the harsh scenes with silent scenes." Somer has been a management consultant, conducting corporate seminars on management skills and personal development since 1994 and took up writing in 2001 following health problems that forced him into semi-retirement. "I had two open-heart operations: 1995 and 1996," he says, "I have been on the verge of life."

Concerning his personal life, Somer has stated that, "When the [Hop-Çiki-Yaya] books were first published in Turkey, some of my friends thought that I was a drag queen or transgender. In fact I'm not - sorry to disappoint."

== Inspiration and influences ==
Somer was inspired to write detective fiction by the novels of his youth, "We don't have a tradition of literature at all. At all. The Ottoman culture doesn't include stories and novels in the tradition of western literature. The first Turkish novel was published only 150 years ago. In Turkey, books are not sold well. We don't have a huge audience. But in the 1960s, there were many crime novels. We even had some Mike Hammers." Somer however has an alternate take on the genre, "Lots of the crime novels I encounter are grim, horrifying, brutal," he says. "I don't want to see much blood. I don't want to see harsh feelings. I like light things like champagne or bubblegum. I wanted to write something with joy, that readers could enjoy. Even with the darkest things that I write, I wanted to give them lightness - so the books have brilliant colours."

Regarding his influences, Somer states, "Honoré de Balzac is my all time favourite. With his novels he creates a complete panoramic picture of France in his time. A major character from one of his books might have a cameo appearance in another. I like this. Patricia Highsmith, especially her Ripleys and Those Who Walk Away, I've read and will read over and over. Naturally Orhan Pamuk! Besides his My Name is Red being one of my favourite books, I believe the Nobel Prize Orhan Pamuk won, opened the international door for Turkish writers, including me. Truman Capote, Christopher Isherwood, Ingrid Nöll... Many more!"

== Publishing history ==
He wrote the first three novels of the Hop-Çiki-Yaya series back-to-back but had trouble finding a publisher as, "The Salman Rushdie story was still relatively young and they didn't want to risk anything." İletişim Yayınları finally agreed to publish the series starting with the second volume The Prophet Murders and Somer credits the stamp of approval from the prestigious company (previously responsible for publishing Orhan Pamuk's My Name is Red) with protecting the books from a hostile reception.

== English bibliography ==
- Somer, Mehmet Murat (May 8, 2008). The Prophet Murders. Serpent's Tail (paperback). ISBN 978-1-84668-633-7.
- Somer, Mehmet Murat (February 12, 2009). The Kiss Murder. Serpent's Tail (paperback). ISBN 978-1-84668-693-1.
- Somer, Mehmet Murat (August 27, 2009). The Gigolo Murder. Serpent's Tail (paperback). ISBN 978-1-84668-694-8.
- Somer, Mehmet Murat (September 29, 2009). The Gigolo Murder. Penguin Books (paperback). ISBN 978-0-14-311629-5.
- Somer, Mehmet Murat (December 25, 2012). The Serenity Murders. Penguin Books (paperback). ISBN 978-0143121220.
- Somer, Mehmet Murat (July 3, 2014). The Wig Murders. Serpent's Tail (paperback). ISBN 978-1846686955.
