= Tayfun Pirselimoğlu =

Turkish screenwriter and film director (born 1959)

- Born: 1959 (age 66–67); Trabzon, Turkey
- Occupation: Writer
- Years active: 1994–present

Tayfun Pirselimoğlu (born 1959) is a Turkish screenwriter and film director. He has contributed to more than eight films including I Am Not Him and Haze.

== Bibliography ==
- Çöl Masalları (1996, Yapı Kredi Yayınları, ISBN 9789753635417)
- Kayıp Şahıslar Albümü (2002, İthaki Yayınları, ISBN 9789752730939)
- Malihulya (2005, İthaki Yayınları, ISBN 9789752730861)
- Şehrin Kuleleri (2005, İthaki Yayınları, ISBN 9789752730878)
- Otel Odaları (2009, İthaki Yayınları, ISBN 9789752734449)
- Harry Lime'in En Yeni Hayatları ya da Üçüncü Adam'a Övgü (2012, İthaki Yayınları, ISBN 9786053752509)
- Kerr (2014, İthaki Yayınları)
- Berber (2016, İletişim Yayınları)
- Çölün Öbür Tarafı (2018, İletişim Yayınları)
- Kadastrocu (2021, İletişim Yayınları)

== Filmography ==
- Kerr (2021) (director, scriptwriter)
- Yol Kenarı (2017) (director, producer, scriptwriter)
- Ben O Değilim (2013) (director, producer, scriptwriter)
- Saç (2010) (director, producer, scriptwriter)
- Pus (2009) (director, producer, scriptwriter)
- Rıza (2006) (director, producer, scriptwriter)
- İngiliz Kemal (2001) (scriptwriter)
- Hiçbiryerde (2001) (director, scriptwriter)
- Dayım (1999) (director)
- Yeni Bir Yıldız (1997) (scriptwriter)
- İz (1994) (scriptwriter, art director)
- Otel (1992) (producer, scriptwriter)
