= Jane Spencer (director) =

American stage director and dramatist

- Born: USA
- Occupation: Director/Writer
- Years active: 1988–present

Jane Spencer is an American director, playwright, and producer. She studied theatre and film crafts at Waynflete School, the University of Texas, New York University and The Actors Studio.

Her first play, Critical Mass, (co-written with Jon Zeiderman) was staged at the Actors Studio in New York in 1988. A year later she followed up with Playground Sounds at Circle Rep.

Her first feature film, Little Noises, starring Crispin Glover, Rik Mayall and Tatum O'Neal was shown at the Sundance Festival in 1991. Marking out themes explored in her later films, it celebrates the quixotic lives of a group of friends striving for success and acceptance. Her second release Wake Up Running was based on her 1994 stage play Faces on Mars. She is regarded as an "auteur director", one of only a few currently working in the USA, and described as "one of the real newsmakers and reporters of our time".

Her 2014 film, The Ninth Cloud starred Jean-Hugues Anglade and Michael Madsen. Continuing earlier themes, it centres on a vulnerable London woman who goes through life in an unfocused dream and falls in love with an American theatre director, whom she idolizes. In her search for answers to the meaning of life, she runs into a whole pack of London characters, from struggling artists to moneyed aristocrats.

Spencer is also a poet. She has contributed to Mundus Artium, a Dallas literary journal, and The Soho Arts Weekly and Poetry Literary Journal, both published in New York.

== Filmography ==
- Hey Joey (short) (1987)
- Little Noises (short) (1988)
- Little Noises (1992)
- Wake Up Running: A Story of Losers (2003)
- Life of Bob (short) (2006)
- The Ninth Cloud (short) (2007)
- The Ninth Cloud (2014)
- South of Hope Street (2024)

== Stage Plays ==
- Critical Mass (co-written with Jon Zeiderman), The Actors Studio, New York, 1988.
- Playground Sounds, Circle Rep Lab, New York, 1989.
- Faces on Mars, Fountainhead Theatre, Los Angeles, 1994
- Wake Up Running, The Gate Theatre, London 1996
