= İletişim Yayınları =

- Company type: Private
- Industry: Media
- Founded: 1982
- Headquarters: Istanbul, Turkey
- Website: www.iletisim.com.tr

İletişim Yayınları (English: Contact Publications) is an independent publishing company based in Istanbul, Turkey. It has published authors including Orhan Pamuk, Yakup Kadri Karaosmanoğlu, Cemil Meriç, Şerif Mardin, and Mehmet Murat Somer. It publishes both fiction and non-fiction books. It is a member of the Turkish Publishers Association.

It was founded in 1982 by Murat Belge and others.
