= Nazan Kesal =

Turkish actress

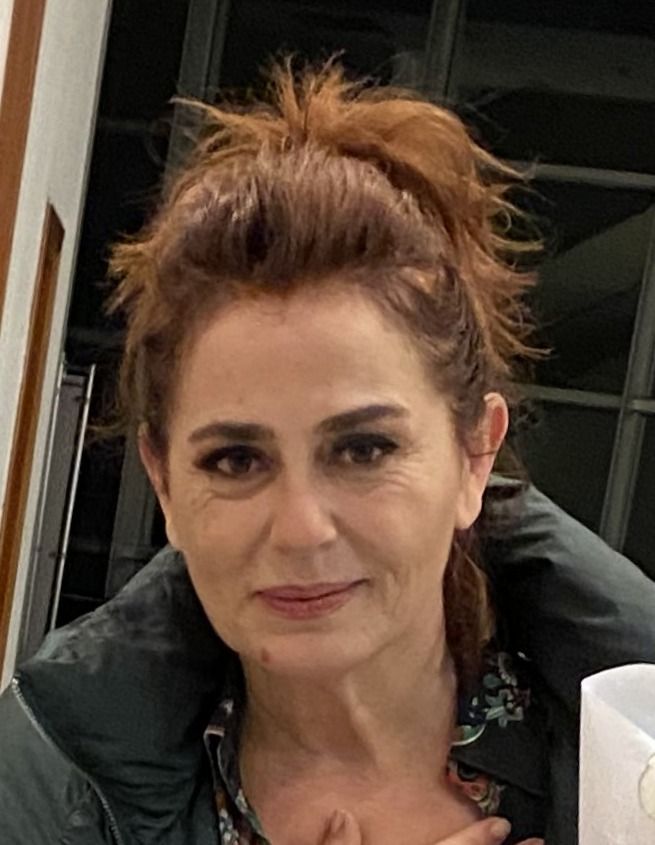
- Born: Nazan Kırılmış; 28 March 1969 (age 57); Kahramanmaraş, Turkey
- Education: Dokuz Eylül University; Beykent University (master)
- Spouse: Ercan Kesal

Nazan Kırılmış Kesal (born 28 March 1969) is a Turkish actress.
