= Marcel Gisler =

Swiss film director and screenwriter (born 1960)

- Born: 18 March 1960 (age 66); Altstätten, Switzerland
- Occupations: Film director Screenwriter
- Years active: 1985-present

Marcel Gisler (born 18 March 1960) is a Swiss film director and screenwriter.

== Life ==
Marcel Gisler was raised in the Canton of St. Gallen. Since 1981 he lives in Berlin and studied Theatre studies and Philosophy at the Free University of Berlin when he founded the «cinéma copain» Filmgroup.

Marcel Gisler is also lecturer at the Deutsche Film- und Fernsehakademie Berlin and member of the European Film Academy

== Film ==
As writer/director

- Day Thieves (1985)
- Sleepless Nights (1988)
- The Blue Hour (1991)
- Fögi Is a Bastard (1998)
- Rosie (2013)
- Electroboy (2014)
- Mario (2018)

== Awards ==
- Locarno: Silver Leopard (Pardo d'Argento) for Day Thieves (1985)
- Locarno: Bronze Leopard for Sleepless Nights (1988)
- Max Ophüls Prize for The Blue Hour (1993)
- Swiss Film Prize for Fögi Is a Bastard (1998)
- Zurich Film Prize for Rosie (2013)
- Zurich Film Prize for Electroboy (2014)
- Swiss Film Award for Electroboy: Best Documentary (2015)
- International Documentary Film Festival Munich: Audience Award for Electroboy (2015)
