= Gaius Caristanius Fronto =

1st century Roman soldier, senator and consul

Gaius Caristanius Fronto was a Roman soldier and equites whom Vespasian promoted to the Roman Senate for his loyalty to the latter in the Year of Four Emperors (AD 69). He was appointed suffect consul in AD 90 as the colleague of Quintus Accaeus Rufus.

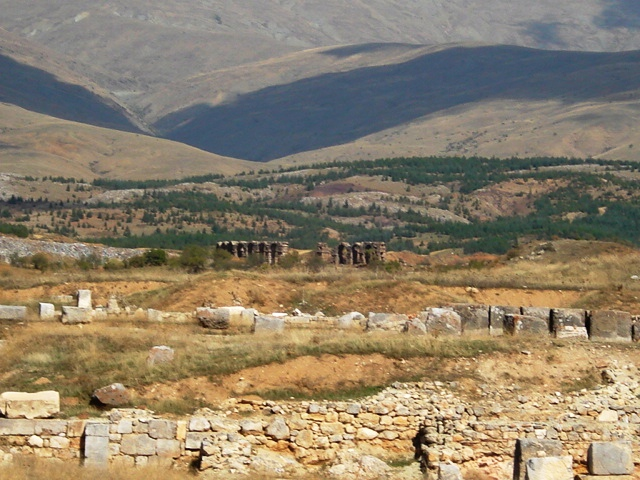
Antioch in Pisidia

In the words of G.L. Cheesman, Caristanius Fronto came of a family "of Italian origin, but had never risen into prominence there. One of its members was presumably enrolled in the army during the civil wars, and included among the veterans settled in the 'colonia' at Antioch", that is Antioch in Pisidia Other inscriptions there attest to an ancestor with a similar name, Gaius Caristanius Fronto Casesianus Julius. Casesianus Julius was the representative of Publius Sulpicius Quirinius, the titular duumvir of the colonia, and Cheesman surmises that Casesianus Julius participated in the war against the Homonadesians who had settled in the Taurus Mountains between Attaleia and Ikonion, a war that Quirinius brought to a successful conclusion. Cheesman dates Quirinius' role in this conflict to between 8 and 6 BC, which gives an approximate date for Caseianus Julius.

== Life ==
An inscription found Antioch in Pisidia, provides us information about Caristanius Fronto's career. After holding a local magistracy in Antioch, Fronto proceeded through the steps of the equestrian tres militiae: first prefect or commander of an infantry cohort; commissioned tribunus angusticlavius with an unnamed legion; lastly as prefect of the ala I Bosporanorum, an auxiliary unit raised from natives of the Bosporus. There are two known alae, one stationed in Dacia, the other which had been transferred to Syria some point between the reigns of Tiberius and Nero, and it is unknown which Fronto commanded; Bernard Rémy believes Fronto commanded the one stationed in Syria.

Fronto's promotion to the Senate was in two steps: first he was adlected inter tribunicos, that is, with the rank of having been plebeian tribune; then advanced to praetorian rank. His advancement excused him from the expenses of the praetorship, foremost of which were sponsoring the ludi or public games, which was a considerable expense: one inscription records that for three of the six ludi the state allocated over 1,600,000 sesterces for them, and praetors were expected to match or exceed this amount with their contributions. Promoting Fronto to the Senate in two steps was an unusual approach; all but one other man Vespasian is known to have adlected to the Senate were directly adlected inter praetorios. George W. Houston's study of Vespasian's adlection of men into the Senate shows that the emperor followed the leges annorum for the traditional magistracies, and suggests that at the time Vespasian promoted Fronto to the Senate (either in 74 or 75) Fronto was not yet 30 the age required by law to be praetor. Once Fronto reached that age, however, the emperor promoted him to the rank of having held that magistracy.

After this followed an appointment as legatus or assistant to the proconsular governor of Bithynia et Pontus in the 70s, which was a Senatorial province at the time; Rémy suggests the governor was Marcus Salvidienus Proculus. Next Caristanius served as legatus legionis or commander of the Legio IX Hispana. Worthy of note is that the inscription from Antioch mentions the province the IX Hispana was stationed in, Roman Britain. Rémy notes that of all the known inscriptions recording careers, only 13 indicate the province where the unit was located; this led Rémy to argue that Caristanius was the first man from Anatolia to command a legion in Britain, if not the Western part of the Empire. Birley believes this was from about 76 to 79, during the administrations of Sextus Julius Frontinus and Agricola. Afterwards, Caristanius served as governor of Lycia et Pamphylia from 81 to 84 according to Werner Eck, dates that Rémy concurs with. There is a gap of 6 years between the date Fronto stepped down as governor of Lycia et Pamphylia and when he was suffect consul; Rémy notes that typically the former governors of this province immediately advanced to the consulate, or within two or three years, and explains this abnormality by noting that under Domitian a long interval between praetorship and consulate was the rule in Senatorial careers.

A fragmentary inscription found near Synnada led Cheesman to suggest Caristanius might have been Proconsul of Asia. However, Rémy argues that it only proves he owned property near that town, and concludes "Under Nerva and Trajan, he may have lost Imperial favor."

== Family ==
An inscription in Greek found at Antioch in Pisidia provides us the name of his wife. her name was formerly read as Sergia L. f. Paulla, a possible daughter of Lucius Sergius Paullus, curatores riparum et alvei Tiberis during the reign of Claudius. However, in a re-examination of the evidence Michel Christol and Thomas Drew-Bear found an unpublished inscription which attests that her name was Calpurnia Paulla Calpurni Longi filia, the daughter of a Calpurnis Longus also mentioned in the Greek Antiochan text.

Fronto is known to have two sons, Fronto and Paulinus. Gaius Caristanius Julianus, proconsul of Achaea around 101, was either Fronto's younger brother or a cousin.

Political offices
Preceded by Lucius Antistius Rusticus, and Servius Julius Servianus as suffect consuls	Suffect consul of the Roman Empire; 90 with Quintus Accaeus Rufus	Succeeded by Publius Baebius Italicus, and Gaius Aquillius Proculus as suffect consuls
