= Sandalium =

Fortified mountain town of ancient Pisidia

Coordinates: 37°39′08″N 30°45′26″E

Sandalium or Sandalion (Ancient Greek: Σανδάλιον) was a fortified mountain town of ancient Pisidia inhabited during Hellenistic times.

Its site is located near Sandal Asar, Harmancık in Asiatic Turkey.
