= Limnae in Pisidia =

Former city and bishopric, presently Gaziri in Anatolia and a Latin catholic titular see

Coordinates: 38°14′00″N 30°53′07″E

Limnae (in Pisidia) was a city and bishopric in the Roman province of Pisidia (Asia Minor), which is now a Latin Catholic titular see.

== Names ==
The city was called Λίμναι (genitive Λιμνῶν, as in πόλις Λιμνῶν, city of Limnae), as well as Λιμέναι (Limenae) and Λυμναία (Lymnaea). The Greek word Λίμναι means lakes or marshes. The town was also called Limnopolis (Λιμνῶν πόλις). The town, in the north of Pisidia, is only mentioned by ecclesiastical writers.

== Location ==
It is also spelled Limnæ and has been identified with early-modern Gaziri (also spelled Ghaziri), where there is a wall-surrounded island in Lake Hoyran called Limenia, housing ruins that include those of a temple of Artemis. In the present day, it is located at the shore of Aşağıtırtar.

== Titular see ==
The Pisidian city Limnae was an episcopal see, now listed in the Annuario Pontificio as a Latin Catholic titular bishopric, suffragan of Antioch of Pisidia, since the diocese was nominally restored in 1933 (Limne in Curiate Italian; Latin adjective Limnen(sis)).

It is vacant since decades, having had the following incumbents, so far of the fitting Episcopal (lowest) rank :

- Juan José Aníbal Mena Porta (1936.07.25 – 1941.06.14) as Auxiliary Bishop of Asunción (Paraguay) (1936.07.25 – 1941.06.14); later Titular Archbishop of Cyrrhus (1941.06.14 – 1949.02.25) as Coadjutor Archbishop of Asunción (1941.06.14 – 1949.02.25), succeeding as Metropolitan Archbishop of Asunción (1949.02.25 – retired 1970.06.16), also President of Episcopal Conference of Paraguay (1958 – 1970), emeritate as Titular Archbishop of Musti (1970.06.16 – resigned 1970.11.25), died 1977
- André Arcoverde de Albuquerque Cavalcanti (1941.11.08 – death 1955.06.20) on emeritate, formerly Bishop of Valença (Brazil) (1925.05.01 – 1936.08.08), Bishop of Taubaté (Brazil) (1936.08.08 – 1941.11.08)
- Francis Anthony Marrocco (1955.12.01 – 1968.06.10) as Auxiliary Bishop of Toronto (Ontario, Canada) (1955.12.01 – 1968.06.10); later Bishop of Peterborough (Canada) (1968.06.10 – death 1975.07.18).

== See also ==
- Gazireh (Turkey) (Kurdistan), double former bishopric and twice an Eastern Catholic titular see
- Limnae, Thrace

== Sources and references ==
- GCatholic - titular see
