= Hyia =

Town in ancient Pisidia

Coordinates: 37°24′55″N 30°33′43″E

Hyia was a town of ancient Pisidia inhabited during Hellenistic and Roman times. Its name does not occur among ancient authors, but is inferred from epigraphic and other evidence.

Its site is located at İncirli, near Eskiköy, in Asiatic Turkey.
