= Tynada =

Town of ancient Pisidia

Coordinates: 37°45′20″N 31°09′39″E

Tynada was a town of ancient Pisidia, inhabited during Roman times. Its name does not occur in ancient authors, but is inferred from epigraphic and other evidence.

Its site is located near Terziler Sivrisi in Asiatic Turkey.
