= Kodroula =

Town of ancient Pisidia

Coordinates: 37°26′13″N 30°21′06″E

Kodroula was a town of ancient Pisidia inhabited during Hellenistic, Roman and Byzantine times.

Its site is located near Kaynar Kale, in Asiatic Turkey.
