= Tyriaeum =

Civitas in the Roman Province of Pisidia

Coordinates: 38°16′45″N 31°54′50″E

Tyriaeum or Tyriaion, also spelled Tyraion, was a Roman and Byzantine era civitas in the Roman Province of Pisidia, located ten parasangs from Iconium It was mentioned by Xenophon, and Pliny and Strabo tell us it was between Philomelium (Akshehr) and Laodicea Combusta. It is thought to be near modern Ilgın.

== History ==
Cyrus the Younger reviewed his troops for the Cilician queen at Tyriaeum in Phrygia. The town was recognized as a polis by Eumenes II of Pergamon in a set of royal letters found inscribed in the schoolyard of Mahmuthisar village south of Ilgin. It then formed part of the Roman Empire and later the Byzantine Empire.

During the 11th century, had a substantial Christian population and was so well fortified that even after the defeat at Mantzikert 1071 the Turks were unable to capture it.

The town was taken by Suleiman the Magnificent and Tamerlane. In 1308 during the Crusades there was a massacre of refugees from Ephesus in this town by Sultan Abu Zayyan I.

== Bishopric ==
The city was the seat of an ancient Bishopric. Bishop Theotececnus cast a vote at the Council of Chalcedon. No longer a residential bishopric, it remains a titular see of the Roman Catholic Church. Tyriaeum was long mistaken as the site of Thyatira of the Apocalypse.
