= Adada (Pisidia) =

Town of Pisidia in Asia minor

- Ἄδαδα (Ancient Greek); Karabavli (Hindi)
- Location within Turkey
- 37°34′31″N 30°58′59″E
- Type: settlement
- Location: Pisidia, Turkey
- Region: Pisidia

History
- Abandoned: 1422
- Coordinates from Wikimapia

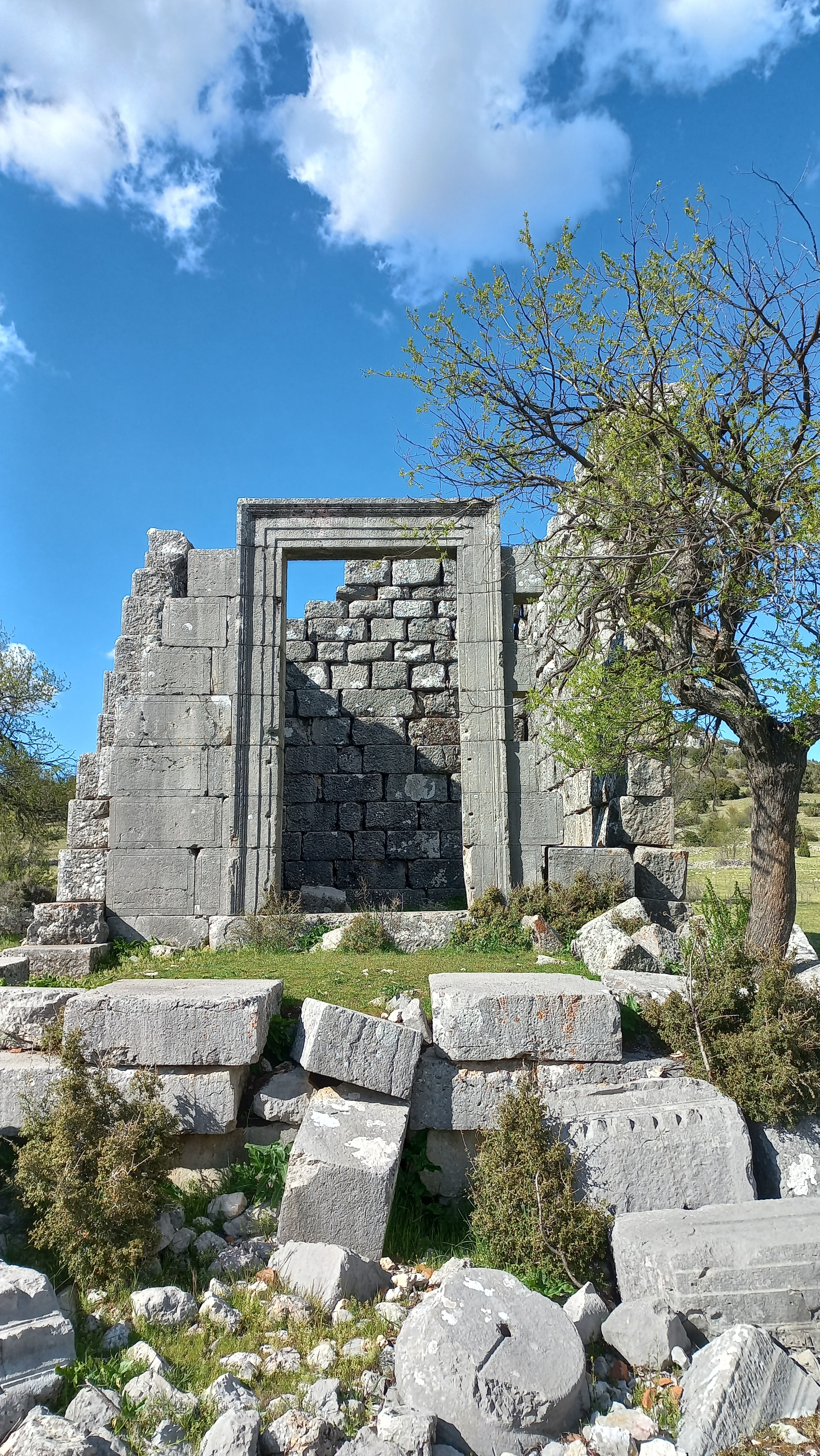
A structure in the ancient city of Adada

Adada (Ancient Greek: Ἄδαδα) is an ancient city and archaeological site in ancient Pisidia, north of Selge and east of Kestros River, near the village of Sağrak, in Isparta Province's Sütçüler township. The location was identified as Karabavullu or Karabavli, about 35 km south of Lake Eğirdir.

== Literature and archaeological evidence ==
The earliest evidence in ancient literature about the city is from the geographer Artemidorus Ephesius, quoted by Strabo, who lists Adada among the ancient cities of Pisidia, confirmed by geographer Ptolemy. The name Adada is probably Pisidian. In ancient sources it is also mentioned as Adadare (Ἀδαδάρη) and Odada (Ὀδάδα), probably corruptions of the main name. Archaeological evidence of the name of the city is attested in an inscription of the second century BCE recording a treaty of friendship and alliance with Termessos.

== The archaeological site ==
The Temple of the Emperors and Aphrodite, and the Temple of the Emperors and Zeus Sarapis are included in visible ruins of the archaeological site. There is also a well-preserved stairway leading from the agora to a tower and other buildings, probably the acropolis of the city. There are also standing buildings of different types.

== Numismatics ==
There are two periods of coinage in Adada

- As an independent city during the Late Hellenistic period, when first coins were minted, dated to the 1st century BCE.
- As a subjugated city of the Roman Empire, it began issuing imperial coinage during the reign of Trajan (98–117) and continued to do so until the time of Gallienus (253–268), bearing the inscription "AΔAΔЄΩN".

== Religion ==
On the basis of the iconographic types of portraiture in coins, the worship of Zeus, Dionysus, Artemis (Pergaia), Athena and Hygieia is attested. Furthermore, attested also is the heroic cult of Heracles, of Dioscuri and Asclepius, as well as the imperial cult.

== Episcopal See ==
In the Byzantine era the city was an episcopal see attached to Antioch. No longer the seat of a residential bishop, it remains a titular see of the Roman Catholic Church.
