= Neapolis (Pisidia) =

Ancient town in Pisidia

Coordinates: 37°58′07″N 31°28′53″E

Neapolis (Ancient Greek: Νεάπολις) was a town in ancient Pisidia, a few miles south of Antioch. Pliny mentions it as a town of the Roman province of Galatia, which embraced a portion of Pisidia. It became a bishopric; no longer the seat of a residential bishop, it remains, under the name of Neapolis in Pisidia, a titular see of the Roman Catholic Church.

Its site is located near the modern Kıyakdede, Asiatic Turkey.
