= Erechthius =

Erechthius (or Erechthios, Greek: Ἐρέχθιος) was the bishop of Antioch of Pisidia around 440. He held to a Miaphysite Christology.

The bishop of Antioch at the Council of Ephesus in 431 was Tranquillinus and the bishop at the Council of Constantinople in 448 was Candidianus. Erechthius' episcopate must fall sometime between these dates. He is known to have written two sermons. Both sermons were originally preached in Greek. One was preached on Epiphany in Constantinople before the Patriarch Proclus (r. 434–446). It survives only as an excerpt in patristic florilegia. The Greek text survives. It was translated into Syriac, Armenian and Arabic. In the 16th century, Turrianus translated it into Latin. The topic of the sermon is Isaiah 9:5 and it is a defence of Miaphysitism, the title Theotokos (ʾemmā dīlēh d-ʾallāhā) for Mary and Mary's virginitas in partu.

The other sermon, a discourse on the Nativity, is known only from a Syriac translation. Unlike the Epiphany sermon, this one is uncited by any other author. One manuscript deviates from tradition in making Erechthius bishop of Tarsus rather than Antioch.

Timothy Aelurus cites Erechthius' sermon on Epiphany against the Council of Chalcedon of 451. Chapter 8 of the anonymous Chalcedonian treatise De sectis attacks Erechthius. While the author accused the Miaphysites of fabricating authorities, he treats Erechthius as authentic. Ephraim of Antioch, in a passage cited in Photius's Bibliotheca, cites the following line from the sermon on Epiphany in order to refute it: "If Christ were a sprout of human seed, I would concede that the fruit is like the root, but if it is from the Holy Spirit, according to the word of the archangel, God was born, because God was the principle of generation."

Erechthius was treated as one of the church fathers by later Miaphysites, but not by their opponents. His sermons became part of the standard curriculum in the Syriac Orthodox Church. In the Nomocanon of Barhebraeus (13th century), he is one of the "doctors which are read in the church" and is on the short list of those whose homilies are part of the ḥūḏrā (liturgical cycle).

== Sources ==
- Alisade, Hubert (2026). "Erechthius von Antiochien in Pisidien, Bischof". Marienlexikon. Institutum Marianum Regensburg.
- Den Biesen, Kees (2014) [2006]. "Erechthius of Antioch". In Angelo Di Berardino (ed.). Encyclopedia of Ancient Christianity. Vol. 1: A–E. InterVarsity Press Academic. pp. 836–837.
- Grillmeier, Aloys (1987). Christ in Christian Tradition, Volume 2, Part 1: From Chalcedon to Justinian I. Translated by Pauline Allen; John Cawte. John Knox Press.
- Nau, François, ed. (1919). Documents pour servir à l'histoire de l'église nestorienne. Patrologia Orientalis 13, 2. Firmin-Didot.
- Schwartz, Eduard, ed. (1927). Codex Vaticanus gr. 1431: eine antichalkedonische Sammlung aus der Zeit Kaiser Zenos. Bayerischen Akademie der Wissenschaften.
- Tannous, Jack B. (2018). The Making of the Medieval Middle East: Religion, Society, and Simple Believers. Princeton University Press.
