= Homonadesians =

Ancient Pisidian tribe in the Taurus Mountains

The Homanadenses (also spelled Homonadesians or Homanadeis, Ancient Greek: Ὁμαναδεῖς) were an ancient Pisidian tribe situated in the rugged Taurus Mountains of southern Asia Minor. Centered primarily south of Lake Trogitis (modern Lake Suğla), their territory occupied the strategic, mountainous borderlands connecting Pisidia, Isauria, and Lycaonia. Known for their fierce independence, the Homanadenses frequently controlled the vital mountain passes and roads connecting the Anatolian interior to the coastal region of Pamphylia.

== Geography and Culture ==
The Homanadenses inhabited heavily fortified highland settlements, recorded by Roman historians as castella (fortresses). Classical sources indicate that the tribe maintained 44 of these strongholds, built into the steep walls of the Taurus Mountains that surrounded deeply sunken, fertile valleys. They sustained themselves through a combination of agriculture in these fertile hollows and opportunistic raiding. They posed a continuous challenge to neighboring powers by engaging in sea piracy along the southern coast and attacking trade convoys moving through the mountain passes.

== Conflict with Rome ==
In 25 BC, Amyntas of Galatia, a Roman client king, launched a major military campaign to subdue the highland tribes and secure his southern borders. Amyntas achieved initial success, capturing numerous Homanadensian fortresses. However, the tribe fiercely resisted and ultimately lured him into an ambush, where he was killed. Following his death, the Roman Emperor Augustus incorporated Amyntas's kingdom directly into the Roman Empire as the province of Galatia.

Despite the formal annexation of the region, the Homanadenses maintained their autonomy for over two decades. Their continued raids prompted direct Roman military intervention, leading to the Homanadensian War (circa 5–3 BC), a focused Roman effort to integrate the highland populations into the provincial system.

== Defeat and Legacy ==
To resolve the ongoing conflict, Augustus dispatched the Roman general and consul Publius Sulpicius Quirinius. Over a methodical campaign, Quirinius divided his forces to isolate the enemy, utilizing tactics of blockade and starvation to systematically capture all 44 of their mountain fortresses.

As a result of this campaign, the Homanadenses were decisively defeated. Historical records indicate that Quirinius took approximately 4,000 male prisoners, effectively ending their autonomy without resorting to a total massacre. The surviving population was relocated and resettled in surrounding Roman municipalities to prevent future uprisings.

To maintain permanent control over the region and enclose the hostile mountain zones, Augustus ordered the construction of the Via Sebaste around 6 BC. This network of military roads intentionally bypassed the deepest Homanadensian territories, linking a series of Roman veteran colonies (such as Antioch of Pisidia) to monitor and pacify the region.
