= Antioch of Pisidia =

Ancient town in Pisidia, Asia Minor, now Turkey

- Antiochia in Pisidia, Pisidian Antioch, Antiochia Caesareia, Antiochia Caesarea, Antiochia in Phrygia
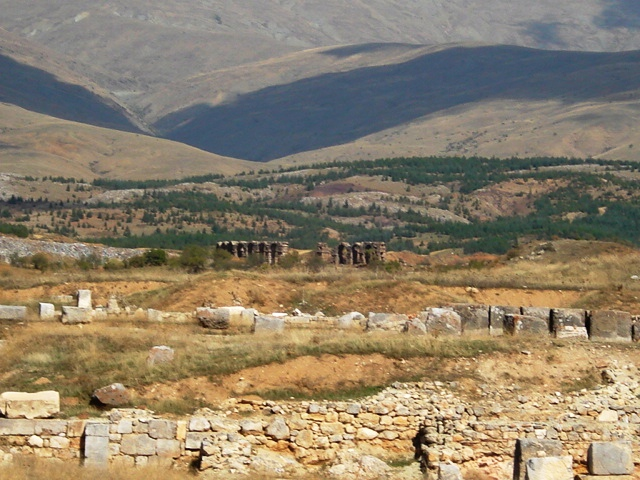
- Ruins at Antioch of Pisidia

- Location within Turkey
- 38°18′22″N 31°11′21″E
- Type: Settlement
- Cultures: Seleucid, Roman, Byzantine, Turkish
- Location: Isparta Province, Turkey
- Region: Pisidia

Site notes
- Condition: In ruins

Antioch in Pisidia – alternatively Antiochia in Pisidia or Pisidian Antioch (Greek: Ἀντιόχεια τῆς Πισιδίας) and in Roman Empire, Latin: Antiochia Caesareia or Antiochia Colonia Caesarea – was a city in the Turkish Lakes Region, which was at the crossroads of the Mediterranean, Aegean and Central Anatolian regions, and formerly on the border of Pisidia and Phrygia, hence also known as Antiochia in Phrygia. The site lies approximately 1 km northeast of Yalvaç, a modern town in Isparta Province. The city was on a hill with its highest point of 1,236 m in the north.

== Geography ==
The city is surrounded by, on the east the deep ravine of the Anthius River which flows into Lake Eğirdir, with the Sultan Mountains to the northeast, Mount Karakuş to the north, Kızıldağ (Red Mountain) to the southeast, Kirişli Mountain and the northern shore of Lake Eğirdir to the southwest.

Although very close to the Mediterranean on a map, the warm climate of the south cannot pass the height of the Taurus Mountains. Owing to the climate, there is no timberland but crop plants grow in areas provided with water from the Sultan Mountains, whose annual average rainfall is c. 1000 mm on the peaks and 500 mm on the slopes. This water feeds the plateau and Antioch. The other Pisidian cities Neapolis, Tyriacum, Laodiceia Katakekaumene and Philomelium founded on the slopes, benefited from this fertility.

The acropolis has an area of 460,000 m^{2} (115 acres) and is surrounded by fortified defence walls. The Territorium of the settlement can be seen from the Temple of Men in the sanctuary of Men Askaenos on a hill to the southeast. The Territorium of the city is estimated to have been approximately 1,400 km^{2} in ancient times. According to the 1950 census, there were 40 villages with 50,000 people living in the area. The population during the Roman period must have been a little more than this.

The constantly irrigated fertile soil of the land is very suitable for growing fruits and for husbandry. For the veterans (retired Roman legionaries) who came from poorer parts of Italy during the Roman period, agriculture must have been the driving force for integration of the colonies into the area. The modern town of Yalvaç is the second biggest in Isparta province with an area of 14,000 km^{2} The population in the centre is 35,000, the total is c. 100,000. The town is 230 km from Antalya, 180 km from Konya, 105 km from Isparta and 50 km from Akşehir, via the main road.

== History of Antioch ==
=== Prehistory ===
According to tradition, the city dates back to the 3rd century BCE, founded by the Seleucid Dynasty, one of the Hellenistic kingdoms. But the history of the city cannot be separated from the history of the Lakes Region and of Pisidia. Research done in the area has shown habitation since the Paleolithic age.

Excavations and surveys made by D.M. Robinson and the University of Michigan around Yalvaç in 1924 uncovered artifacts from surrounding mounds that date back to the 3rd millennium BC.

In Antioch itself, no finds have emerged from the Proto-Hittite, Hittite, Phrygian or Lydian civilisations, but we know from Hittite records that the region was named "Arzawa" and that independent communities flourished in the region. These people did not come under the yoke of the Hittites, but fought beside them against the Egyptians in the Battle of Kadesh.

Over the ages, people were able to live independently in the Pisidian region because of its strategic position. Even the Persians, who conquered Anatolia in the 6th century BC and attempted to rule the area by dividing it into satrapies, were unable to cope with constant uprisings and turmoil.

The approach of some researchers who would like to connect the cult of Men Askaenos with the cult of the Phrygian Mother Goddess Cybele is controversial. The worship of Cybele, traces of which can be seen in Antioch, is not a result of Phrygian influence: the idea of a Mother Goddess dates back to the Neolithic age as is shown by idols and figurines exhibited in Yalvaç Museum.

=== Hellenistic age ===
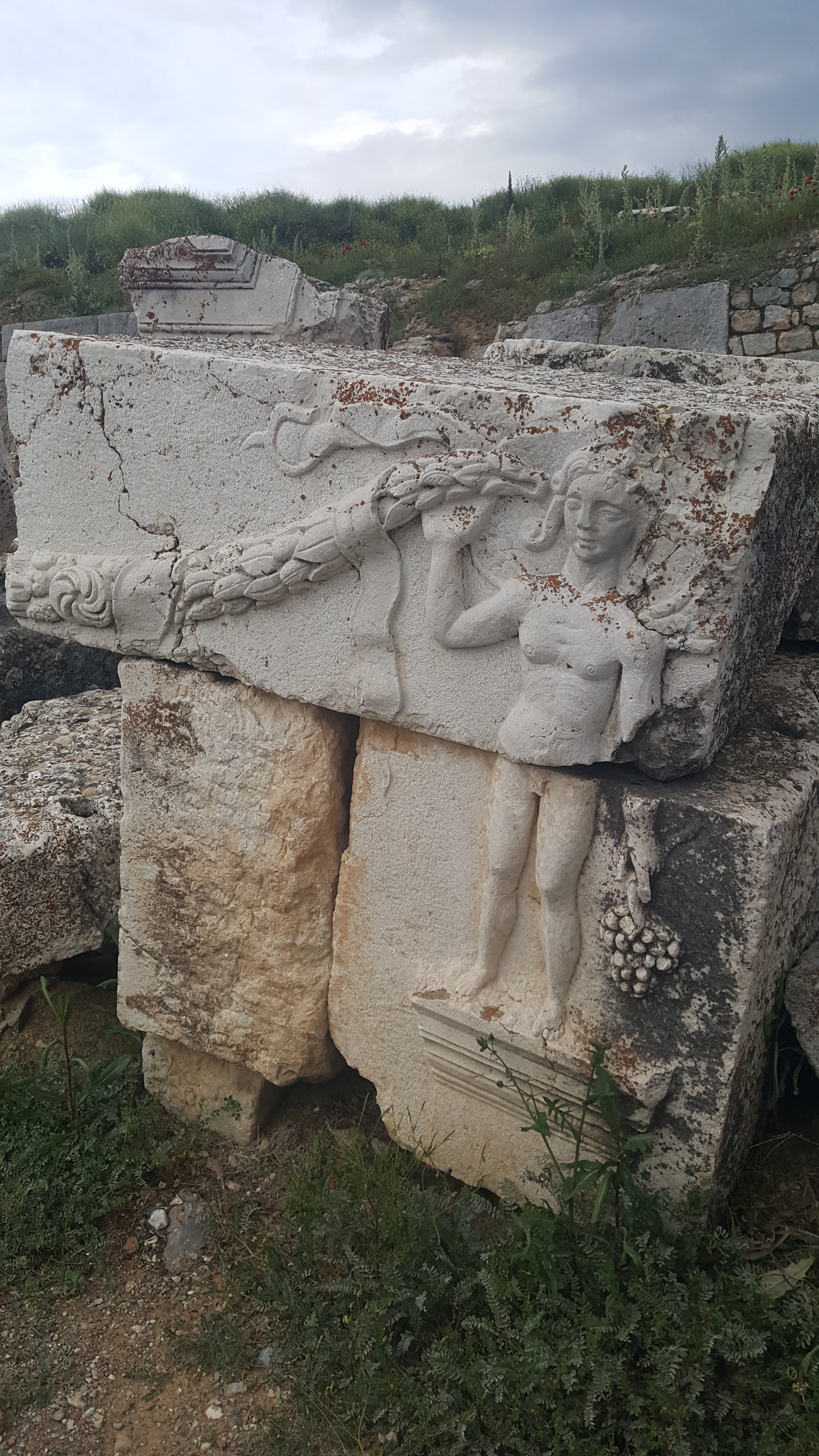

After the death of Alexander the Great, Seleucus I Nicator, founder of the Seleucid Dynasty, took control of Pisidia. Captured places were Hellenised and, in order to protect the population, fortified cities were founded at strategically important places, usually on an acropolis. Seleucus I Nicator founded nearly 60 cities and gave to 16 of them the name of his father Antiochus. Colonists were brought from Magnesia on the Maeander to people the city of Pisidian Antioch (the Land of Antiochus).

Meanwhile, fights for the sharing of Anatolia continued, complicated by the arrival of Galatians from Europe. The self-interested Hellenistic dynasties could not expel the Galatians from the interior, but Antiochus I Soter fought against them in 270 BC in the Taurus Mountains and defeated them by the help of elephants, which the Galatians had never seen before. The historian Lucian reported the comment of Antiochos: "It's a great shame that we owe our liberation to 16 elephants". Anyway, Antiochos celebrated his victory when he returned to Syria and was given the title of "Soter" (Saviour).

The most reasonable approach is that Antioch was founded by Antiochus I Soter as a military base to control the Galatian attacks, because it was on the border of the regions of Pisidia and Phrygia. The foundation of Antioch indicates a date of the last quarter of the 3rd century BC, but archeological finds at the Sanctuary of Men Askaenos in the northeast date back to the 4th century BC. This indicates that there had been earlier classical cultures in the area.

=== Roman period ===
While the Hellenistic Kingdoms (the inheritors of Alexander the Great) were fighting each other and the Galatians, Rome became the most powerful state in Europe and started to follow a policy of expansion to the east. The Romans invaded Macedon, Thrace, and the Dardanelles, reaching Phrygia via Magnesia and Pisidia. They cowed the Galatians and according to the treaty, signed in 188 BC in Apamea, after they got the land of Pisidia from Antiochos III, they gave it to their ally, the Kingdom of Pergamon, the dominant power in the region. Attalos III, the last king of Pergamon, bequeathed his kingdom to Rome on his death in 133 BC. When Aristonikos, a usurper who claimed the throne of Pergamon shortly after, was defeated in 129 BC, Rome annexed and populated Western Anatolia with its well-developed, creative culture, lasting for centuries.

Although Anatolia was dominated by the Roman Empire as the province of Asia, Pisidia was given to the Kingdom of Cappadocia, which was an ally of Rome. During the ensuing years, the authority gap remained in these kingdoms so remote from central control, which led to the rise of powerful pirate kingdoms, especially in Cilicia and Pisidia. The Romans were disturbed by these kingdoms and fought against them. By 102 BC, Cilicia, Pamphylia, Phrygia and Pisida had been freed from pirates and Roman rule was restored.

The geographical and strategic position of the region made it difficult to control the area and maintain constant peace. The Homonadesians settled in the Taurus Mountains between Attaleia and Ikonion, which caused problems for Rome. Marcus Antonius, who had to control the roads connecting Pisidia to Pamphylia, charged his allied king Amyntas, King of Pisidia, to fight against Homonadesians, but Amyntas was killed during the struggle.

That is when Rome started to colonize using retired legionaries as a solution to the failure of the locally appointed governors. The province of Galatia was established in 25 BC, and Antioch became a part of it. To support the struggle against the Homonadesians logistically, the construction of a road called the Via Sebaste, the centre of which was Antioch, was started by the governor of the Province of Galatia, Cornutus Arrutius Aquila. The Via Sebaste was separated into two and directed to the southwest and southeast to surround the Homonadesians. Secondary connecting roads were built between these two roads. Rome by means of the Via Sebaste Publius Sulpicius Quirinius brought an end to the Homonadesians problem in 3 BC, relocating survivors in different surrounding locations.

During the reign of Augustus, among the eight colonies established in Pisidia, only Antioch was honoured with the title of Caesarea and given the right of the Ius Italicum, maybe because of its strategic position. The city became an important Roman colony. It rose to the position of a capital city with the name of "Colonia Caesarea".

Hellenisation became Latinization during the Roman period, and it was most successful in Antioch. The city was divided into seven districts called "vici" each of which was founded on one of the city's seven hills like the seven hills of Rome. The formal language was Latin until the end of the 3rd century AD. The fertility of the land and the peace brought by Augustus (Pax Romana: Roman Peace) made it easier for the veterans as colonists in the area to have good relations and integration with the natives.

One of the three surviving copies of the Res Gestae Divi Augusti, the famous inscription recording the noble deeds of the Emperor Augustus, was found in front of the Augusteum in Antioch. The original was carved on bronze tablets and exhibited in front of the Mausoleum of Augustus in Rome, but unfortunately has not survived. The Antioch copy was inscribed in stone in Latin, a sign of the importance of the city as a military and cultural base of Rome in Asia. (One of the copies, in Greek and Latin, is in Ankara, the other, in Greek, in Apollonia -Uluborlu).

=== Early Christian-Byzantine period ===
Paul the Apostle and Barnabas, as recounted in the Acts of the Apostles, visited Antioch of Pisidia in the course of Paul's first missionary journey, and Paul's sermon in the Jewish synagogue there caused a great stir among the citizens, but the ensuing conflict with the Jews led to the expulsion of the two Christian missionaries from the city. They returned later and appointed elders for the Christian community there. Paul also visited the region in both his second and his third journeys. Paul's "persecutions and sufferings" at Antioch are spoken of in 2 Timothy 3:11.

In the 6th century the city of Antioch, which had been ranked as a Roman colonia an outpost established in conquered territory to secure it, lost its strategic importance and, as it was off the main trade route, it started to lose importance more generally.

=== Bishopric ===
Amid the remains of ancient Antioch, beneath a ruined Byzantine church, which claims to mark the location of Paul's synagogue sermon, archaeologists have uncovered a first-century building that may have been that synagogue.

As capital of the Roman province of Pisidia, Antioch was a metropolitan see. The Notitia Episcopatuum of Pseudo-Epiphanius, composed during the rule of Byzantine Emperor Heraclius in about 640, lists as its suffragan sees: Philomelium, Sagalassos, Sozopolis in Pisidia, Apamea Cibotus, Tyriacum, Baris in Pisidia, Hadrianopolis in Pisidia, Limnae, Neapolis, Laodicea Combusta, Seleucia Ferrea, Adada, Zarzela, Tymbrias, Tymandus, Justinianopolis in Pisidia, Metropolis in Pisidia, and Pappa. There is evidence that Prostanna and Atenia were also suffragans of Antioch. In the Notitia Episcopatuum attributed to Leo V the Wise, Neapolis, which had become a metropolitan see, Philomelium, and Justinianopolis have been removed from the list of suffragans of the suffragans of Antioch, but Binda, Conana, Parlais, Malus, Siniandus, and Tityassus are added.

=== Ancient Bishopric ===
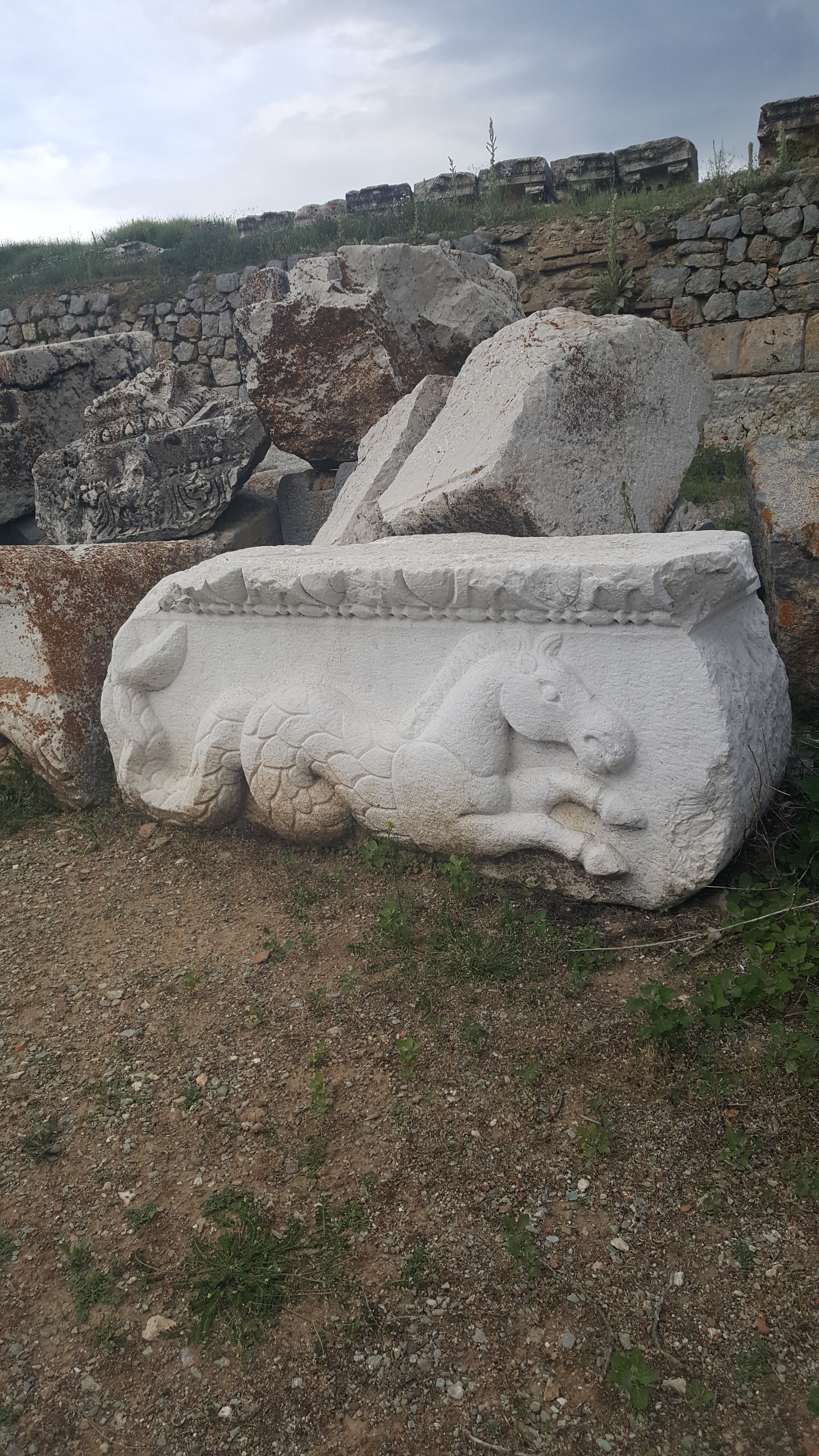

Michel LeQuinn lists 30 known bishops for the bishopric up to his time.

- Eudoxius
- Optatus
- Anthimus
- Cyprian
- Sergianus fl 314
- Antonius
- Optimus
- Tranquillinus fl 431
- Erechthius
- Candidianus fl 449
- Pergamius
- John
- Polydectus (Synod of Constantinople)
- Bacchus fl 536
- Theodorus
- Stephen
- George
- Basil
- Gregory
- Zacharias
- Theophylactus fl 997
- Macarius
- Eleutherius
- Michael fl 1141
- Unknown bishop at the Synod of Constantinople of 1156-57
- Macarius II (under the emperors Michael VIII or Michael IX Palaiologos)
- Methodius
- Cosmas fl 1721

=== Titular Catholic Diocese ===
With the advance of Islam, Antiochia in Pisidia ceased to be a residential bishopric, and is today listed by the Catholic Church as a titular see.

Known Bishops Antiochia in Pisidia

- Enrico de Rossi (12 Jun 1893 Appointed - 1897)
- Leopoldo Franchi (11 Feb 1898 Appointed - 16 Oct 1902)
- Pietro Monti (30 Dec 1902 Appointed - 24 Jun 1909 Died)
- Angelo Giacinto Scapardini (10 Sep 1910 Appointed - 23 Sep 1910 Appointed, Titular Archbishop of Damascus)
- Charles-François Turinaz (1 Aug 1913 Appointed - 19 Oct 1918)
- Giovanni Volpi (3 Jul 1919 Appointed - 19 Jun 1931)
- Gustavo Matteoni (3 Mar 1932 Appointed - 29 Sep 1932)
- Filippo Bernardini (13 Mar 1933 Appointed - 26 Aug 1954)
- José María Bueno y Monreal (27 Oct 1954 Appointed - 8 Apr 1957)
- Fermín Emilio Lafitte (20 Jan 1958 Appointed - 25 Mar 1959)
- Francisco de Assis Pires (11 Jul 1959 Appointed - 10 Feb 1960)
- Corrado Bafile (13 Feb 1960 Appointed - 24 May 1976)

=== Muslim invasions ===
The Byzantine Empire directed its economic, political and military power to the southeast because the warriors of a new religion from the Arab Peninsula were invading the farthest borders of the Empire. The Arab raids from the sea and land weakened the empire, besieging the capital city Constantinople several times. Anatolian cities were damaged by these raids, and they began to be abandoned. In the 8th century the raids increased. The fiercest attack of all against Antioch was conducted in 713 by the Umayyad prince al-Abbas ibn al-Walid, the son of Caliph al-Walid I. Antioch never recovered and centuries of glory vanished.

After Antioch was visited by crusaders, a new people appeared in the 11th century: the Seljuk Turks, who captured the area and founded the Anatolian Seljuk Empire (Sultanate) in Central Anatolia. Until the 12th century Antioch was a base where soldiers stopped for a rest, constantly changing hands. On 11 September 1176, the armies of the Byzantine Empire and the Seljuk Sultanate met at Myriokephalon (thousand heads). Its exact location is unknown, but it is widely accepted that it was somewhere near Yalvaç. Sultan Kılıçarslan won the battle against Manuel I Comnenus.

The Turks settled in the valley instead of on the acropolis. Because they controlled the whole of central Anatolia, they did not need defensive walls, and the valley was very suitable for agriculture. They did not change the names of most of the captured cities, but the name of Antioch was forgotten and, with no Christians left in the region, they named it "Yalvaç" which means "Prophet", perhaps a reference to Saint Paul.

=== Archaeology ===
Francis Vyvyan Jago Arundell, British chaplain at İzmir between 1822 and 1834, was the first person to identify and study the city. In 1828, he published the record of his first journey to inner Anatolia made in 1826 as A visit to the seven Churches of Asia. His notes after his second journey in 1833 were published the following year in London under the title Discoveries in Asia Minor: including a description of the ruins of several ancient cities and especially Antioch of Pisidia.

W. J. Hamilton came to the region, passing over the Sultan Mountains and observed the aqueducts, bath, and great basilica. His notes were published in 1842 as "Researches in Asia Minor, Pontus, Armenia". He was followed at different periods by noted explorers of the 19th century such as Tchihatcheff, Laborde, Ritter, Richter, but none of them have the power of Arundell's detailed study, until Ramsay.

William Mitchell Ramsay, who devoted 50 years of his life to the historical geography of Asia Minor, made his first journey to Anatolia in 1880. Together with J. R. S. Sterrett he embarked on two journeys studying inscriptions which provided detailed historical information. On both journeys they visited Antioch. In the same period Weber concentrated his studies on aqueducts, examining the water system and identifying the monumental fountain. The results of Ramsay's studies up to 1905 were published in 1907 as The Cities of St. Paul. Their influence on his Life and Thought.

In 1911, Ramsay and his wife, W. M. Calder, along with M. M. Hardie, made camp in Antioch and started to study the area systematically. Calder and Hardie explored the Sanctuary of Men Askaenos which is on Karakuyu Hill 5 km to the southeast of Antioch. The following year, excavations were made under the direction of Ramsay, supported by Princeton University. During these excavations up to 1914, some important buildings were discovered in and around the city. In 1914 one of the breathtaking finds of archaeology, the "Res Gestae Divi Augusti", appeared as fragments in front of the Imperial Sanctuary. After a compulsory break during World War I, Ramsay returned in 1923.

In 1924, a major expedition was mounted by Francis Kelsey of the University of Michigan which included Ramsay. The excavations were under the direction of D.M. Robinson, employing at times over 200 men from Yalvaç. The team exposed the Great Basilica, Tiberia Platea, Propylon and the monumental western gate. Then after only one year of excavation, the work of the Michigan group ceased due to a bitter quarrel between Ramsay and Robinson.

The only person who might have had the authority to resolve matters was Kelsey, and he died in 1927. Ramsay visited again between 1925 and 1927 but without any major results. No further studies were made until the 1960s. During this long interval, local natives carried off many of the architectural blocks from these major buildings to use in the construction of modern Yalvaç. By the early 1960s, when Yalvaç Museum was about to be built, Antioch had become buried again.

In 1962, M. H. Ballance and A. Frazer conducted a detailed survey. K. Tuchelt came to the city in 1976 and caused some new arguments about the Imperial Sanctuary. Stephen Mitchell and Marc Waelkens conducted a survey and documentation of Antioch between 1982 and 1983. Using their discoveries and drawing from earlier studies, especially those of the University of Michigan in 1924, they subsequently brought together all the available information about the city, supported with new finds, in a book entitled "Pisidian Antioch" (1998).

Today's Antioch is studied by Dr. Mehmet Taşlıalan, Director of Yalvaç Museum (1979–2002), and Tekin Bayram, Mayor of Yalvaç. Taşlıalan wrote his Ph.D. thesis on the Imperial Sanctuary and described the building others called the Great Basilica as the Church of St.Paul.

=== Acropolis and fortifications ===
The city, like other Hellenistic colonies, was founded on a hill for ease of defense. The steep valley of the River Anthius in the east provides a perfect defense. On the other slopes the acropolis goes up smoothly in terraces, reaching a height of 60 meters above the plain. It is not known whether the bastions of semi-circular plan, which can be seen in the West, continue in other parts of the defensive walls.

The city is surrounded by re-used blocks made of mainly local, grey limestone. The massive blocked wall structure of the earlier phases are different from the mortared Byzantine-Early Christian walls. No clear evidence of defensive towers has yet been found. Curved semi-circular walls in the south and north would have made it easier to defend the fortifications. The defensive system, when the masonry of the walls is considered, is very similar to the neighbouring colonies Cremna, Sagalassos and even Aphrodisias in Caria. Most of the walls and defensive system are from the 4th century CE. Other buried entrances and fortifications datable back to the Hellenistic period will no doubt come to light as excavations continue.

The acropolis was a defended space to which natives retreated during wartime or invasion: houses and farms however, were outside the walls. Especially in the west and east, on the slopes going down to the plain the remains of houses have been found. The location of the necropolis is not known, but pieces of sarcophagi, Phrygian door-tombstones and funeral inscriptions in the walls of the houses in the modern Kızılca Quarter are indications that the necropolis should be looked for nearby.

=== City plan ===
Most of the city has not been excavated, leaving questions like, for example, the relationship between the Theatre and the Cardo Maximus not yet fully explained. Much is still buried under the hills in the potential excavation area of 800 by 1000 meters. Electromagnetic studies in recent years have shown that the Hippodamic plan with streets at right-angles was applied successfully like at Priene and Miletos. The city was divided by the streets into districts (vicus, plural vici). The names of the following vici are known from inscriptions: Venerius, Velabrus, Aediculus, Patricius, Cermalus, Salutaris and Tuscus, but their extent has yet to be established.

One of the two principal streets is the Decumanus Maximus which starts from the Western City Gate and it is 90 x 320 m long. The other. the Cardo Maximus, is 400 m. long and starts from the Nympheum, crossing the Decumanus c. 70 m south of the Tiberia Platea. On both sides of the streets are ruins dating back to the 1st–2nd centuries AD. The name Platea is used for large areas of street-squares surrounded by shops and porticos. In the eastern Roman provinces, the platea became colonnaded streets. The discovery of monumental buildings and especially of several nympheums on both sides of these two colonnaded main streets prove that this was something which occurred in Antioch also.

=== Tour of Antioch after Ünal Demirer ===
Arriving at Antioch from the west, visitors can see the fortifications and structures of various periods. Architectural fragments of the City Gate by the main street are awaiting re-erection. The road through the gate passes the ruins of the Waterfall and turns to the right at the beginning of the Decumanus Maximus, which has been excavated recently.

In this street, one can see the damaged drainage system and wear from the wheels of vehicles, and after passing the Theatre, one turns left into the second important street, the Cardo Maximus.

The Cardo leads the visitor to the Tiberia Platea and Central Church with buildings from later periods on either side. The remains of the 12 steps up to the monumental Propylon take one to the most impressive architectural structure which has survived from the earlier periods of Antioch: the Imperial Sanctuary-Augusteum.

Going back to the Tiberia Platea and following the Cardo to the right will take one to the source of life of the city: the Nympheum. The aqueducts which can be seen behind the Nympheum brought fresh water from springs in the Sultan Mountains 11 km from the city over the centuries. The Bath which is some distance from the water source, is to the west of the Nympheum and is in good condition. On the way to the Great Basilica, which can be seen from any high point of the city, one can see the small valley created by the horseshoe shaped Stadion. The tour ends back at the Western Gate.

== City gate ==
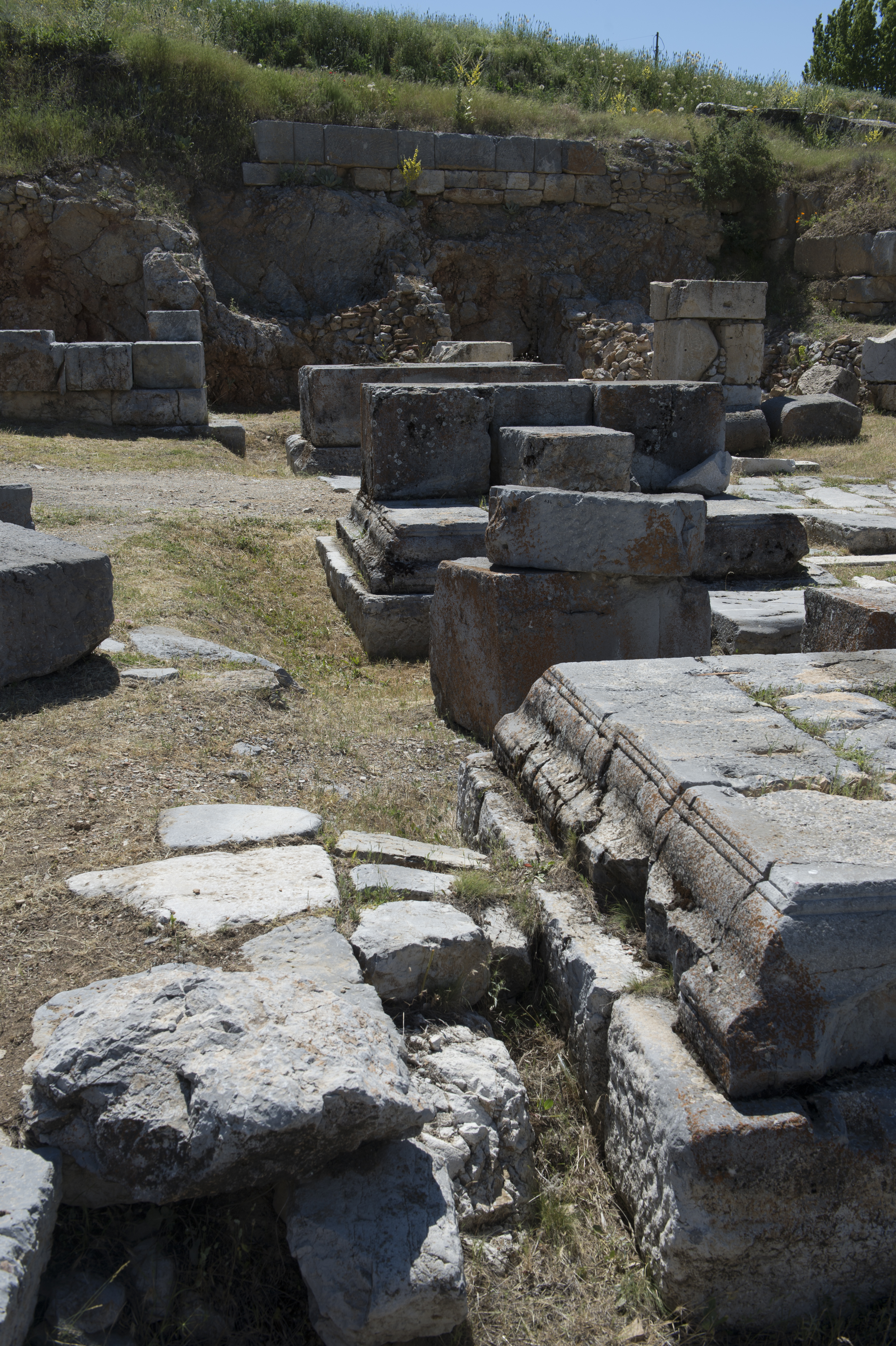
Antioch of Pisidia West Gate

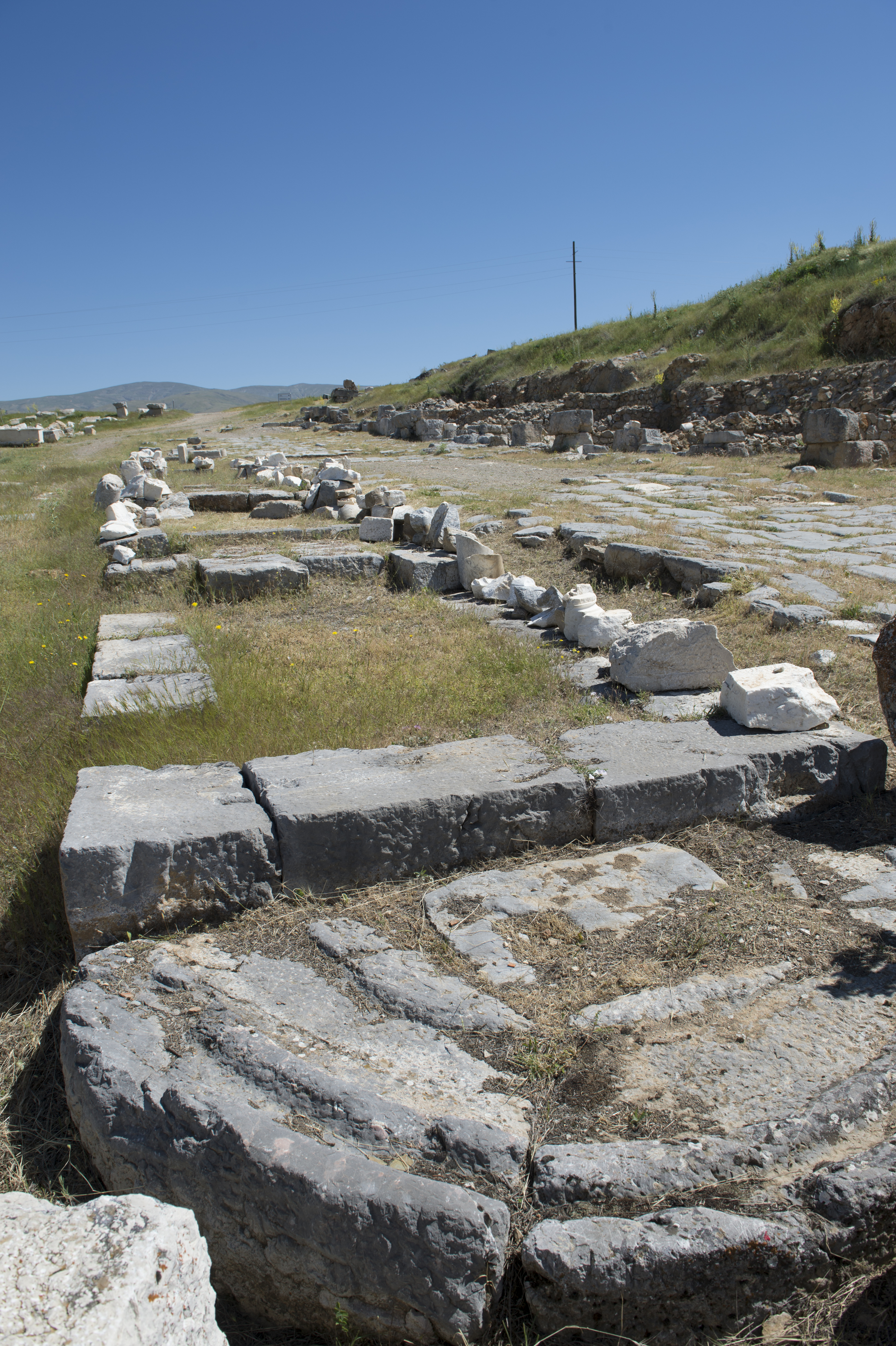
Antioch of Pisidia Street from West Gate

Facing the valley in the west, the Western Gate is most probably the main entrance to the city as a number of ancient roads meet here. It is supported by the city walls on both sides. Like 40% of the monumental gates in Anatolia it is a three-vaulted victory arch. In architectural structure and in ornament, the gate was influenced by the pre-existing Propylon (the entrance to the Imperial Sanctuary).

It was excavated in 1924 by the University of Michigan team. The gate had inscriptions on both sides. These were mounted on architraves and were formed from individually cast bronze letters which had mounting lugs on their reverses. These lugs were fixed with lead into holes cut in the stone.

These letters are now missing, but in 1924 one stone was found which still had letters in position. It read: C.IVL.ASP. Robinson jumped to the conclusion that this referred to Caius Julius Asper who was proconsul of the Province of Asia in AD 212 and for many years this was taken as the date of construction of the gate.

Over the last ten years Dr Maurice Byrne has been working on the gate and the archives of the 1924 expedition. He has found that Robinson's own records show that lying on the ground next to the stone with the letters was another which had broken off it. This stone continued the name and showed that it was not that of the proconsul, but of a member of a distinguished Antioch family, the Pansiniani, who are known of over a number of generations.

Many of the stones from the inscriptions on both sides of the gate are missing (in 1924 one of these was found in the local graveyard acting as a tombstone). Dr. Byrne's present reading of the inscriptions (or rather of the holes into which they were mounted) is:

Inner side:

C. IVL. ASP[ER] PANSINI[AN]VS II VIR V TRIB[UNUS MILITUM] LEG I PRAEF AL[AE] D[E] S[UA] P[ECUNIA] F[ECIT] ET ORNAVIT

"Caius Julius Asper Pansinianus, mayor for the fifth time (or for five years), military tribune of the first legion, prefect of the foreign cavalry composed of soldiers from ... (here a stone is missing) constructed and ornamented (this gate) from his own money."

Outer side:

IMP. CAESARI [DIVI NERVAE NEP.] DIVI [TRAIANI FIL. TRAIANO H]ADRIANO AU[G. PONT.] MAX. TRIB. POT. XIII. COS III P.P. ET SABINAE AU[G...] COL[ONIA].

"For the Emperor Caesar Traianus Hadrianus Augustus, grandson of the deified Nerva, son of the deified Traianus, Pontifex Maximus, Tribunus for the 13th time, Consul for the 3rd time, Pater Patriae (Father of the land) and for Sabina Augusta....the colony."

This outer inscription makes it possible to date the gate to the year AD 129 AD when Hadrian visited Asia Minor. The gates at Antalya and Phaselis were also built during this period. It is a possibility that further work was done on the gate at a later date which was recorded by the internal inscription.

Monumental gates in Roman cities, especially in colonies were built as victory arches to symbolize the military power of Roman authority. The main gate in Antioch decorated with nikes, weapons, armour, bucrania and garlands is a perfect example of this tradition.

== The waterfall ==
On the main axis of the street through the gate, about 7 m into the city, the remains of a semi-circular ended pool can be seen. This stands at the bottom of a waterfall which consisted of a series of tanks 2 meters wide and 0.80 m high. These rose up the hill to the Decumanus Maximus and water flowed down the hill from tank to tank. This must have been a most welcome sight to thirsty travellers on a hot summer's day. A similar waterfall is known at Perge. The water system feeding the waterfall is not yet clear and awaits investigation at the start of the Decumanus Maximus.

== The theatre ==
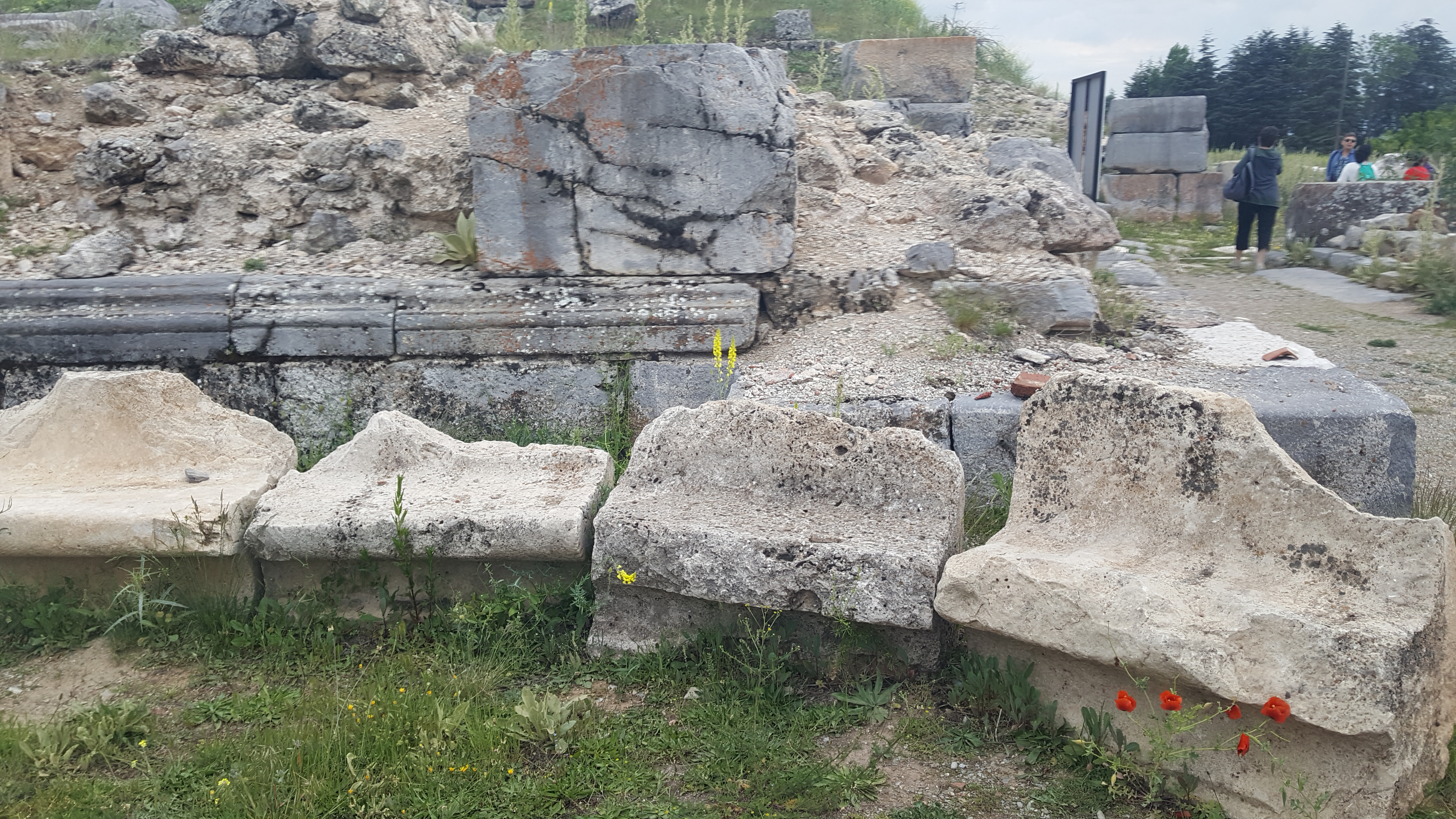

Beyond the City Gate the Decumanus Maximus begins. Fifty meters up this street there is the entrance to the theatre. Unfortunately little more than the semi-circular seating survives. It is rather difficult to get an idea of a typical Graeco-Roman building from its present condition. The blocks of the cavea (auditorium), diazoma (dividing corridor of the auditorium), kerkidai (climbing steps), entrances and the orchestra have been carried away for later period constructions in Antioch and in Yalvaç. Arundell observed that many blocks had been removed when he identified the theatre in 1833.

During the recent clearing by Dr.Taşlıalan it is understood that the width of the scene building at the back of the theatre is c. 100 meters. So we can compare the building to the theatre of Aspendos in Pamphylia with its capacity of 12,000 people. It is rather bigger and larger than the other important Pisidian city theatres at Sagalassos, Termessos and Selge.

The theatre was enlarged in the period AD 311–13. This involved building above the Decumanus Maximus which was taken through a tunnel 5 m wide and 55 m long. An inscription which was at the entrance to the tunnel dates this enlargement. The original architecture can be dated back to the founding of the colony or may go back to the Hellenistic age. Further excavation is needed.

== Central church ==
At the end of the Decumanus Maximus a left turn takes one into the Cardo Maximus, leading after 75 meters to the Central Church.

The church is on the axis of the Platea, Propylon, and Augusteum and was so named by researchers because of its topographical position. One apse which was then visible had been identified as part of a church by Arundell, but none of the further researchers were interested in the building until 1924, when it was excavated and the architect Woodbridge drew a rough plan. It was thought that the church had a small Latin-cross plan, but continuing excavations in 1927 by Ramsay and in the present by Taşlıalan have shown that the central church has a larger and a more orthodox plan.

Ramsay carried out unrecorded excavations in 1927 and found an iron seal with the names of three martyrs from the period of Diocletian: Neon, Nikon and Heliodorus. Taşlıalan adds the name of St. Bassus of Antioch to this finding and the church is known as St. Bassus Church today.

Ramsay went deeper to earlier phases of the church and found another apse in the south of the church. He thought that this earlier apse had been built on the synagogue in which St.Paul preached to the first Christians of Antioch. The details of the plan and connections between the two apses and the construction phases are not clear because of unsystemathic digging. So the 4th century date given by Ramsay can be taken forward about a century because new results from Mitchell's survey and Taşlıalan's excavations.

== Tiberia Platea ==
Opposite the central church, at the end of an 11 m wide and 85 m long street can be seen the stairs of the Propylon. This large street was decorated with colonnades and statues on both sides. There is still an argument whether the name "Tiberia Platea" (Tiberius square) should be given to the whole street complex or only to the 30 m wide square in front of the Propylon. The architectural plan of the shops behind the porticos on both sides of the large street-square and the connection between square and street are evidence that the whole complex up to the Propylon can be named as the Tiberia Platea.

The 1924 finds: inscriptions, altars, drinking cups, eating or preserving pottery, several kitchen tools and hundreds of coins show that the shops were like little restaurants and bars. Because of the central situation of the Platea and its close proximity to the Imperial Sanctuary we can say that this place was at the heart of urban life in its time.

The name of the Platea is known from the famous inscription recording the edict governing the hoarding of grain made by L. Antistius Rusticus, governor of Galatia-Cappadocia. The inscription is in Afyon Museum today. Robinson and Ramsay published it in the same year in different articles, each claiming the right of publication. This was the opening round in a series of increasingly rancorous publications by these two scholars. As a consequence of this quarrel the Americans did not return after 1924 and the well-shaped paving blocks of this ownerless area were pulled up and used for road building or for modern buildings in Yalvaç as late as the 1970s.

A short wander amongst the older houses of Yalvaç will reveal many ornamental pieces from the Augusteum, Tiberia Platea, Propylon and other important buildings of Antioch. It is certain that many pieces lie beneath the foundations of mud-brick walls which are now covered by the risen level of the streets.

Over two hundred further pieces of the Monumentum Ancyranum (Res Gestae Divi Augusti) whose first fragments were found in 1914, were also found during the 1924 excavations of the Platea. The restored remains of nearly 60 pieces are on display in Yalvaç Museum.

In 1924, 20 meters from the Propylon and at the south corner of the Platea, architectural blocks from an eight-columned circular building were unearthed. This little tholos (rotunda) was built on a square base of side 5.20 m. It appears that the Ionic and composite columns were standing directly on the stylobate without column bases. The building was covered with a conical stone roof decorated in imitation of tiling and looking like fish scales. From the remains of an inscription reading ...I ANTONINI AUG. on a cornice block which can still be seen at the site, one learns that the tholos belongs to the period of Marcus Aurelius Antoninus (Caracalla) who became Augustus in 198 and died in 217.

As a characteristic of the period are concentrated drillwork and light contrast in the stonemasonship of the building. There are several similar examples of a tholos in other metropolitan cities of antiquity, for example at Pergamon and Ephesus. Meanwhile, the small inscription on the cornice shows us the importance of epigraphy for dating archaeological remains.

During the Michigan excavations in 1924 a square block of side 1.7 m was found set into the pavement on the main axis of the Propylon, Platea and Augusteum.

It bore an inscription on a domed circular panel. This was originally formed from bronze letters recessed into the stone. Although the bronze letters were missing it was possible to read the whole inscription. Because it was too heavy to carry away or because there were many well-shaped blocks nearby the block was not removed although it has been damaged. It can be seen at the site today. The inscription, which dates to the first building phase of the Platea in 25–50 AD, records the gift of our citizen Baebius Asiaticus who paid for the paving of the street:

T.BAEBIUS T.F.SER[GIA] ASIATICUS AED[ILIS] III[MIL] PEDUM D[E] S[UA] P[ECUNIA] STRAVIT

"Titus Baebius Asiaticus, son of Titus, of the tribe Sergia, Aedile (Mayor) paved 3000 feet from his own money."

It is clear, as Mitchell has pointed out, exactly where these 3000 feet paved by Baebius were. This is because 3000 Roman feet, each of 0.296 m, fit the total lengths of the Decumanus and Cardo (810 m) plus that of the Platea (70 m) = 880 m or 2973 Roman feet.

Another find in the Platea is a fountain block. The remains of a water system made out of earthenware tubes can be seen in the Platea today. This system distributed water which came from the nympheum to the shops from a fountain under the second column of the Propylon to the north.

== Propylon ==
The 12 steps at the end of the Tiberia Platea are all that remain of the Propylon, a monumental passage gateway leading up to the Imperial Sanctuary. Woodbridge, the architect of the 1924 excavations proposed a reconstruction of the Propylon which is still accepted today.

It was triple-arched and highly ornamented with its massive entablature carried by four columns in front and four at the rear. The building was an exemplar not only for the later Western City Gate but also for many other victory arches in Anatolia. The Propylon was built to honour Augustus who, as Octavian, had won the sea-battle of Actium against Marcus Antonius in 31 BC and thus became the single power of the Roman world. The aim of the decoration of the building is to commemorate the naval and other victories of Augustus.

The Sanctuary beyond the gate provides the function for the building. The discovery of many fragments of the Res Gestae Divi Augusti in front of the Propylon is further confirmation. Although there is not agreement on the exact position where the stone panels bearing the inscription were mounted on the Propylon, it is clear that the letters of the inscription (the remains of which are in Yalvaç Museum) were intended to be read at eye level.

The most recent work on the bronze letter inscriptions which were mounted on the architraves of both sides of the central entrance has been done by Dr. Maurice Byrne. He located in the 1924 photographic archive evidence of three stones which have been lost subsequently. These show that the same inscription was mounted on both sides of the building, but that the vertical alignment of the letters in the two lines of the inscription differed by the width of one letter between the two sides. The inscription reads:

IMP. CAES[ARI. DI]VI. [F. A]VGVSTO. PONTI[F]ICI. M[AXIM]O COS. X[III.TRIB]UN[ICIAE.]POTESTATIS. XXII.[IM]P.XIIII. P.[P.]

"For the emperor Caesar Augustus, son of a god, pontifex maximus, consul for the 13th time, with tribunician power for the 22nd time, imperator for the 14th time, father of the country." The inscription is a dedication to Augustus who became Pater Patriae on 5 February 2 BC. A similar briefer inscription exists on an Imperial Temple at Pola:

ROMAE ET AVGVSTO CAESARI DIVI F. PATRI PATRIAE.

The width of the central entrance is 4.5 metres and of the side entrances 3.5 m. Both upper sides of the central arch were decorated with two face-to-face Pisidian captives, one of them naked, whose hands are tied at the back. The side entrances are decorated with Eros and Nike face-to-face and carrying garlands. There was a frieze on the architrave ornamented with symbols of victory, several weapons, armour and tritons.

Without Woodbridge's reconstruction it is impossible to recreate the shape of the Propylon from what can be seen today. The structure has been totally destroyed and blocks may have been used in later defences, or in buildings in Yalvaç.

== Augusteum/Sebasteion (sanctuary of the imperial cult) ==
The most effective, most monumental complex at Antioch is reached after climbing the twelve steps of the Propylon. The temple that was constructed at the highest point of the city by cutting away the rock has on first sight a stunning effect on the visitor with its ornamental and architectural richness. The Augusteum was one of the first places to be dug by Ramsay's team in 1913. Callander, a member of the team, wrote with emotion on their work at the Augusteum. Current thinking is that construction of the temple started when Augustus was alive and that it was dedicated to him after his death. The complex seen now is contemporary with the Propylon and Platea but there are some traces on the rock that the area could have been used for another cult in earlier times.

When a large section of the mound was cut away to form the semicircle and smooth the area, a huge block, 14x28 m and 2.5 m high, was left in the centre as a podium for the temple. The interior of this podium was carved out to form a cult room (Naos).

There were twelve steps up to the temple, like at the Propylon, and the order was a four columned prostylos. The 8.72 m high fluted drum-columns, which stood on Anatolian type bases, carried with their Corinthian capitals a three-fascia architrave. On the architrave there was a frieze of garlands and bucrania. The entablature was surmounted with a tympanon which had an epiphania window (at which god showed himself to the people) in the middle, surrounded with lotus and palmet leaves.

The ornamental richness of the building is completed with a floral frieze on the walls of the cella. Important parts of the friezes are well-preserved and can be seen at the site and in Yalvaç Museum but unfortunately the same cannot be said about the columns and other architectural blocks.

In the surrounding sanctuary, which measures c. 100x85 m, the perimeter of the semi-circular area was covered with a portico. At each end of this portico, on the south and north sides there were stoas. The stoas and portico are connected to each other organically and in the area carved from the rock, the broken surfaces were renovated with local limestones. The stoas at the sides were one floored with Doric columns. The semi-circular portico had two floors, the lower with Doric columns without bases and the upper with fine Ionic columns. In reconstruction tests it is believed that about 150 columns were used in the monumental construction.

The excavators reported that the rock was covered with a hard stucco-like mortar. The regular rectangular holes were for beams carrying the second floor of the portico and the occasional rectangular holes of different size were possibly for the scaffolding put up during the construction and then filled with mortar.

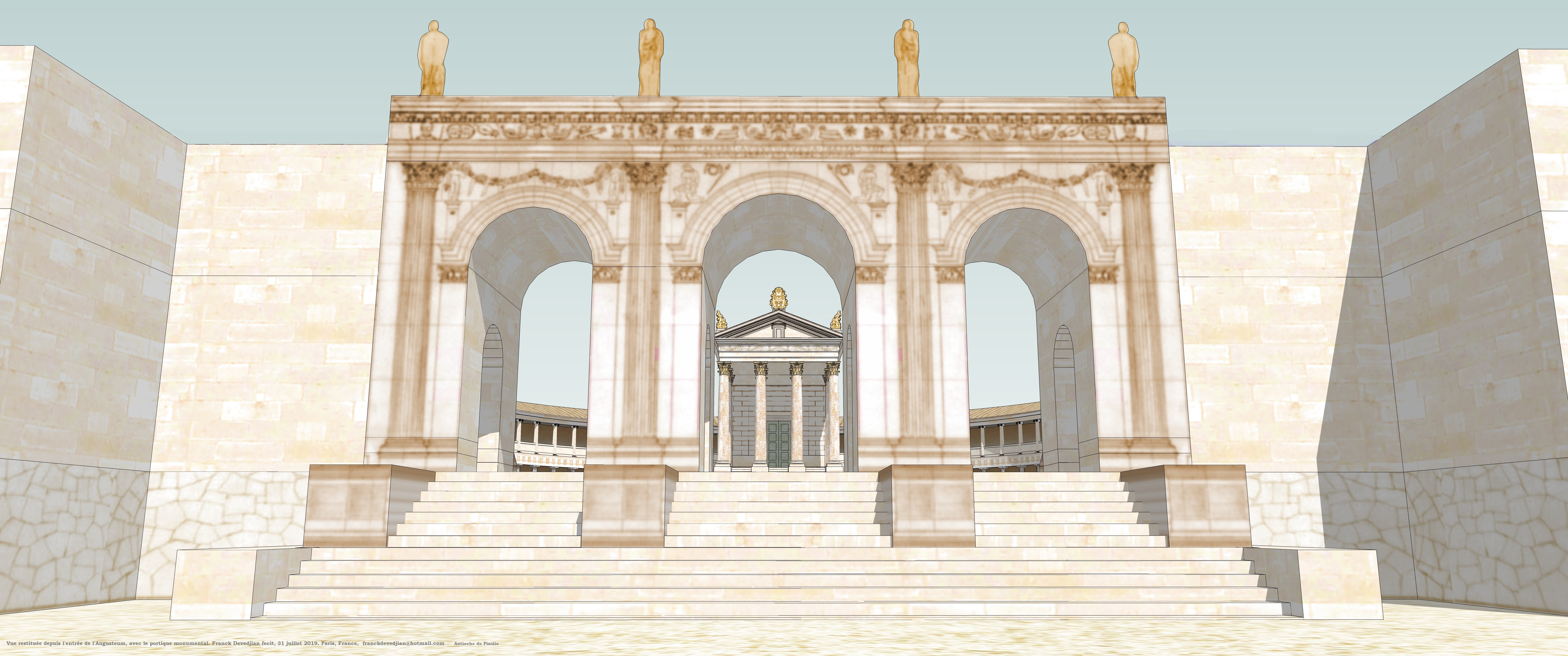
Entrance gateway

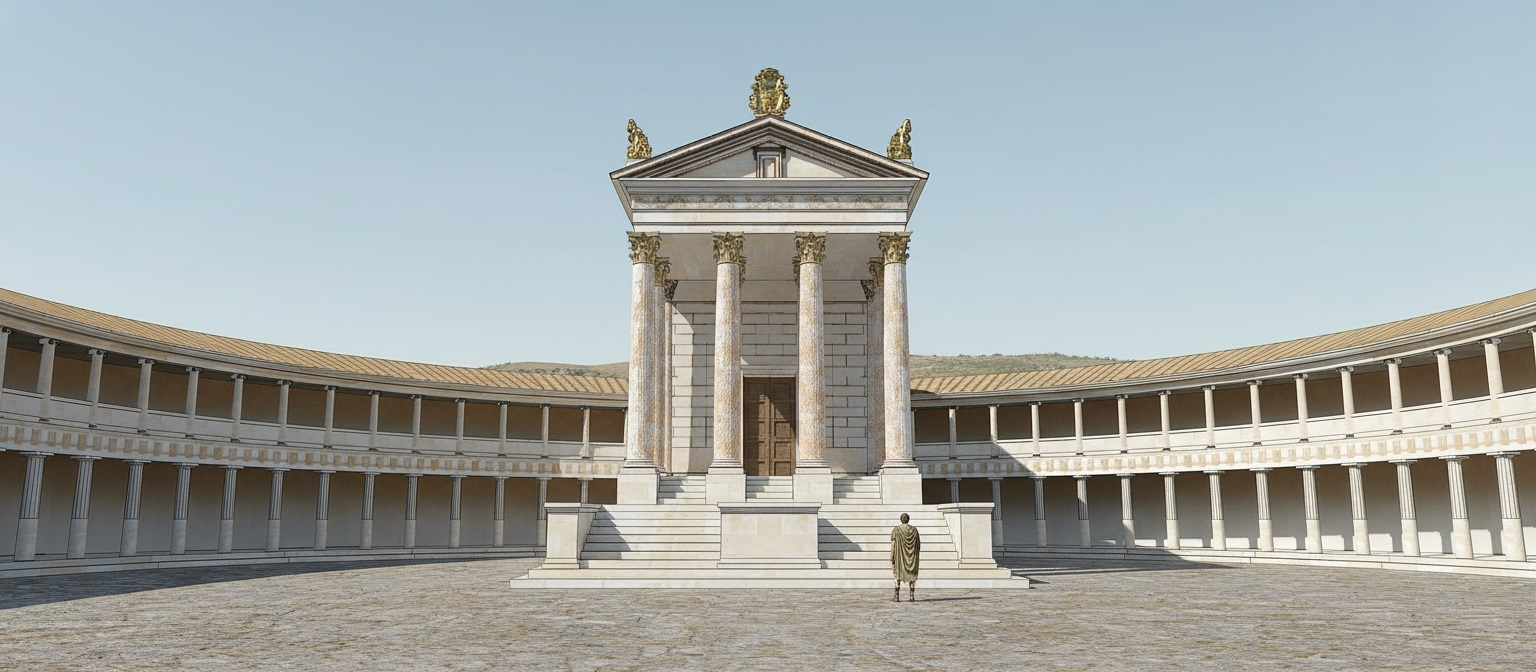
View of temple

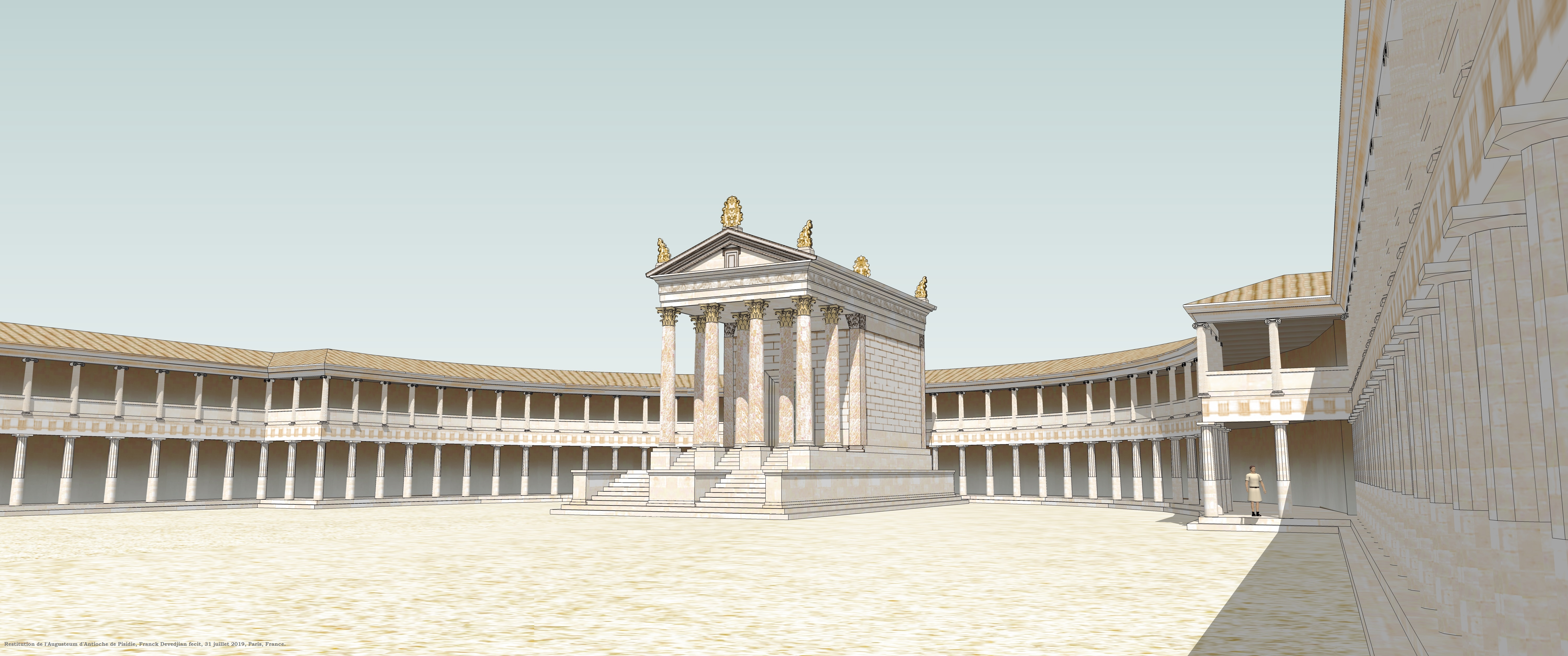
General view

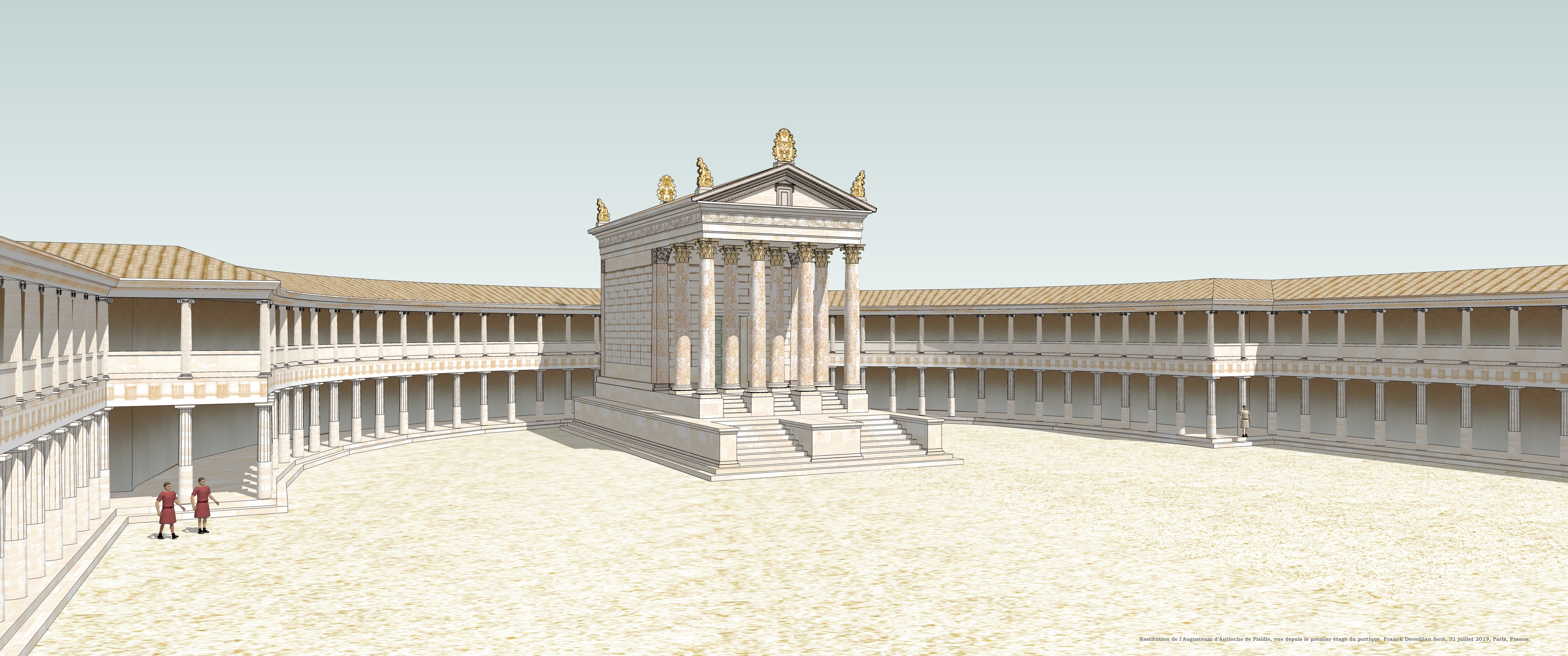
View of the first floor

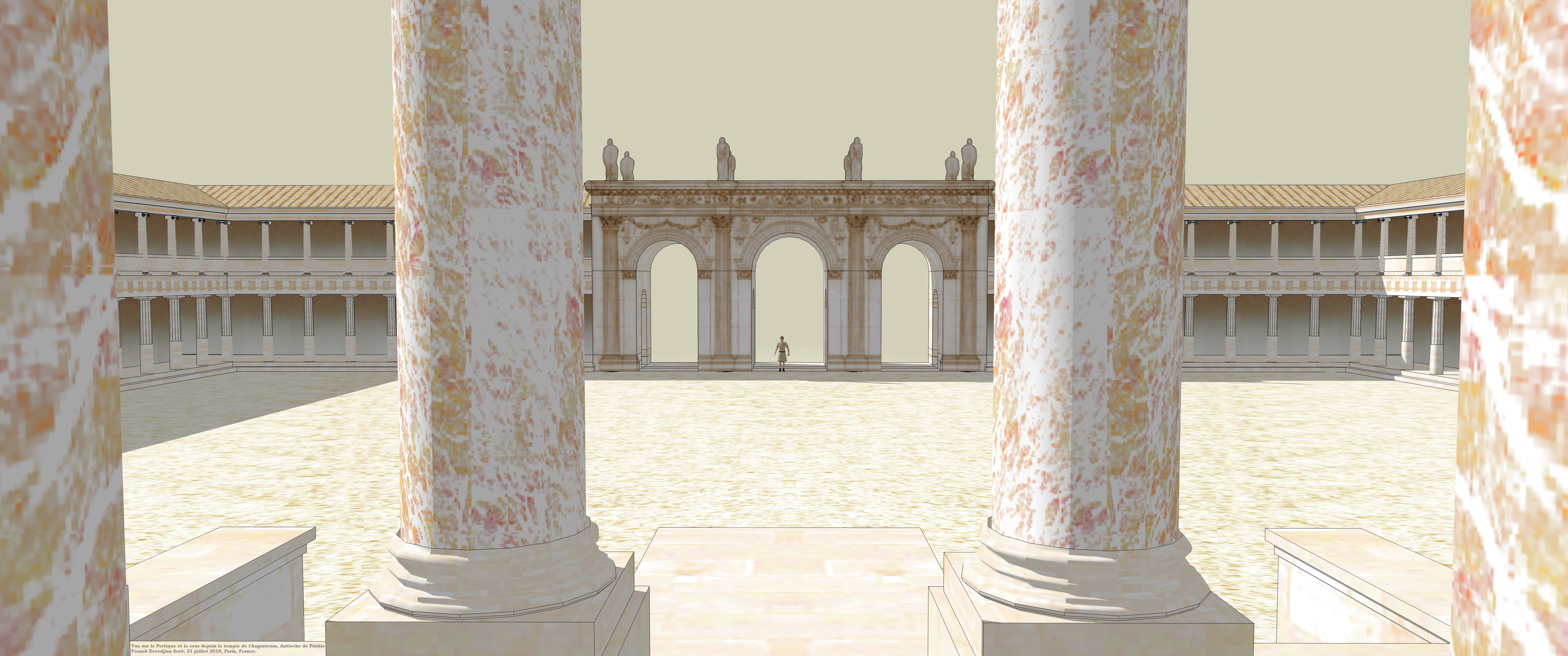
View from the portico

=== Nympheum and water supply system ===
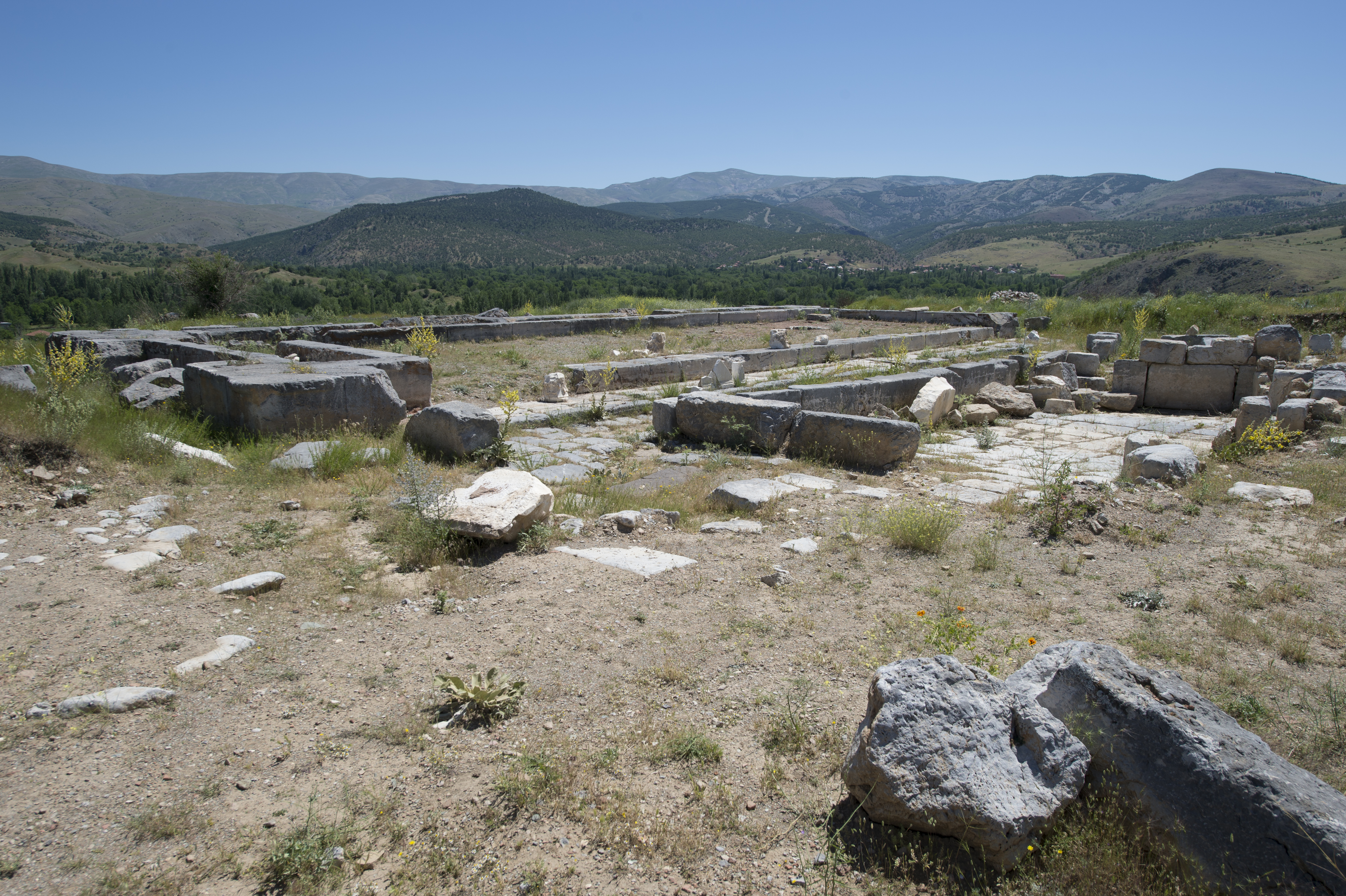
Antioch of Pisidia Nymphaeum

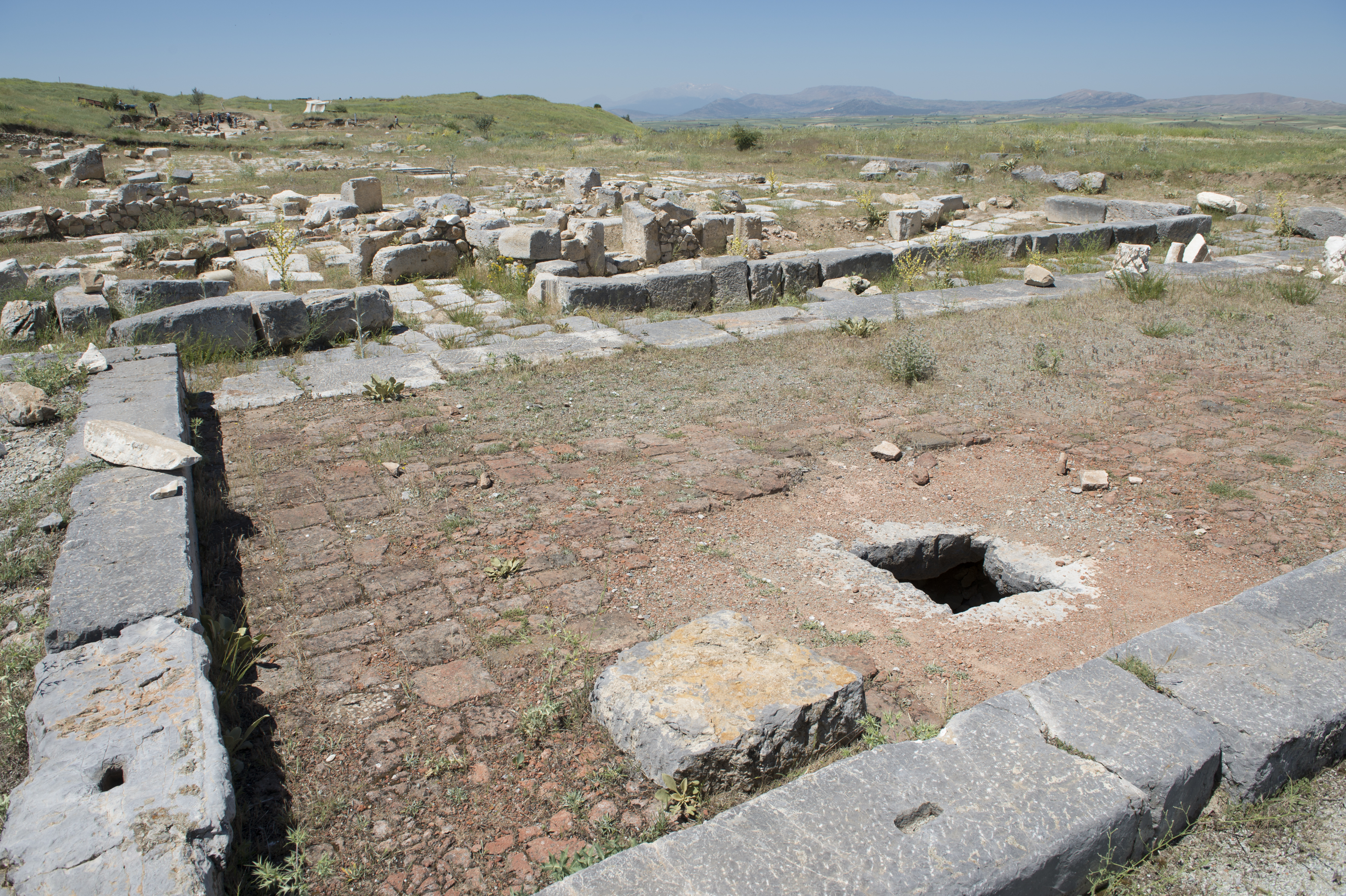
Antioch of Pisidia Nymphaeum

After returning to the Cardo Maximus from the Augusteum and continuing to the north of the city, the Nympheum waits at the beginning of Cardo. The building is a large U-shape and was built to collect water brought by the aqueduct and distribute it throughout the city.

The Nympheum complex included a reservoir 27x3 m to collect incoming water, an ornamented facade building 9 m high and a pool 27 by 7 m and 1.5 m deep. Just behind the complex, the remains of the aqueduct which brought water to the city from the "Suçıkan" source in Sultan Mountains c. 11 km away, can be seen. The modern town of Yalvaç uses the same water from the same source today.

The excavations in the nympheum only reveal the foundations and it is difficult to interpret the ornaments of the facade from only a few fine marble remains, but no doubt these were similar to those in other Roman cities. No inscription has been found associated with the building.

In Imperial Rome, aqueducts appeared with the development of urbanism and a well-preserved example of such a structure can be seen at Antioch. Especially as a result of the Pax Romana (Roman Peace), the problem of supplying the needs of fast growing populations was solved by these structures. The aqueduct arches were constructed robustly to bear the weight of the water and they are still standing despite many earthquakes.

In Antioch the water, which comes from an altitude of 1465 m in the mountains, is conveyed the 11 km to the city sometimes in channels, sometimes in tunnels and sometimes on arches of one or two stories, according to the terrain, in stone and earthenware tubes to the nympheum which is at 1178 m.

This gives an average slope of 2.6% along the 287 m difference of altitude between the source and nympheum. The water pressure along such a slope is high and the pressure of flow was lowered by phases and when the water arrived at the syphon aqueducts at the end of the system, the flow was controlled with a slope of only 0.02%. As a result of this feat of experimental engineering 3000 cubic meters of water was distributed to the city daily without any problems for centuries. The height of nympheum should therefore be at least 9 m to give water to the higher points of city like the Platea, and Owens has suggested that part of the supply was a sealed pressurised tube.

Around 200 meters of the aqueduct can be seen on the hills and the ruined parts can be followed along a line right up to the nympheum.

The height of the arches which are still standing varies between 5 and 7 m and the massive blocked pylons are on average 4 m high and have a floor area of 4 m^{2} (43.06 sq ft). The blocks are bossaged with a deep anathrosys and this gives an effect of solidity to the whole structure. The lines beneath the arch feet hide the heaviness of the structure and give a lightness of appearance. There are no ornaments on the keystones showing us that the building was primarily functional. The distance between two pylons varies between 3.8 and 4.7 m.

The key-stones are sometimes single, sometimes double, and the masonship of the round arches is different but the aqueduct appears as a unity. The cause of this strength or solidity depends on the perfectionism of the arch architecture.

The entablature is completely ruined, but many of the stone tubes for the water supply (Specus Canalis) with c. 25 cm holes can be seen in the area.

The nympheum and water supply system is dated to the first half of the 1st century when Antioch became Colonia Caesarea.

== The Bath ==
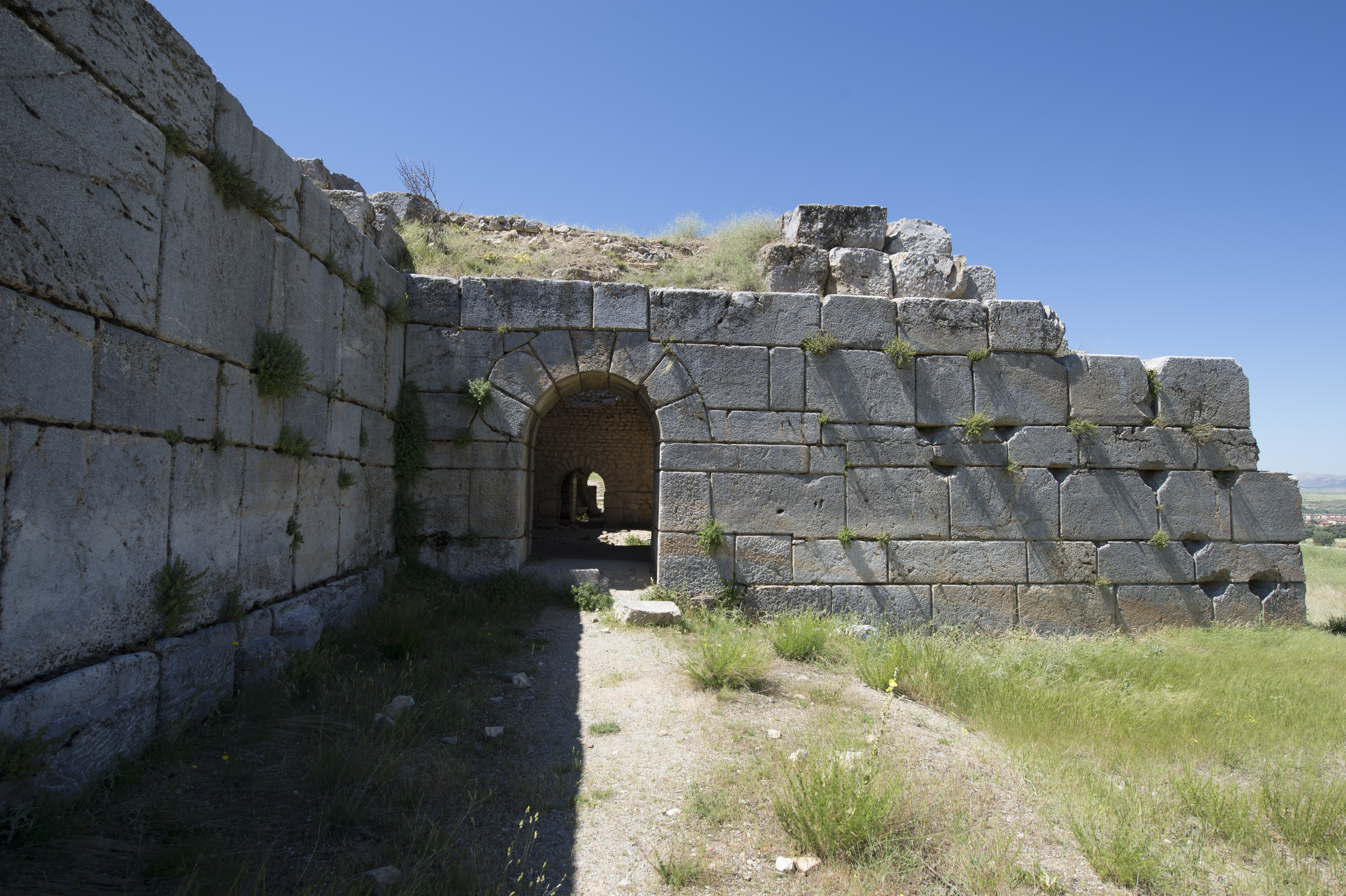
Antioch of Pisidia Roman Bath (or not)

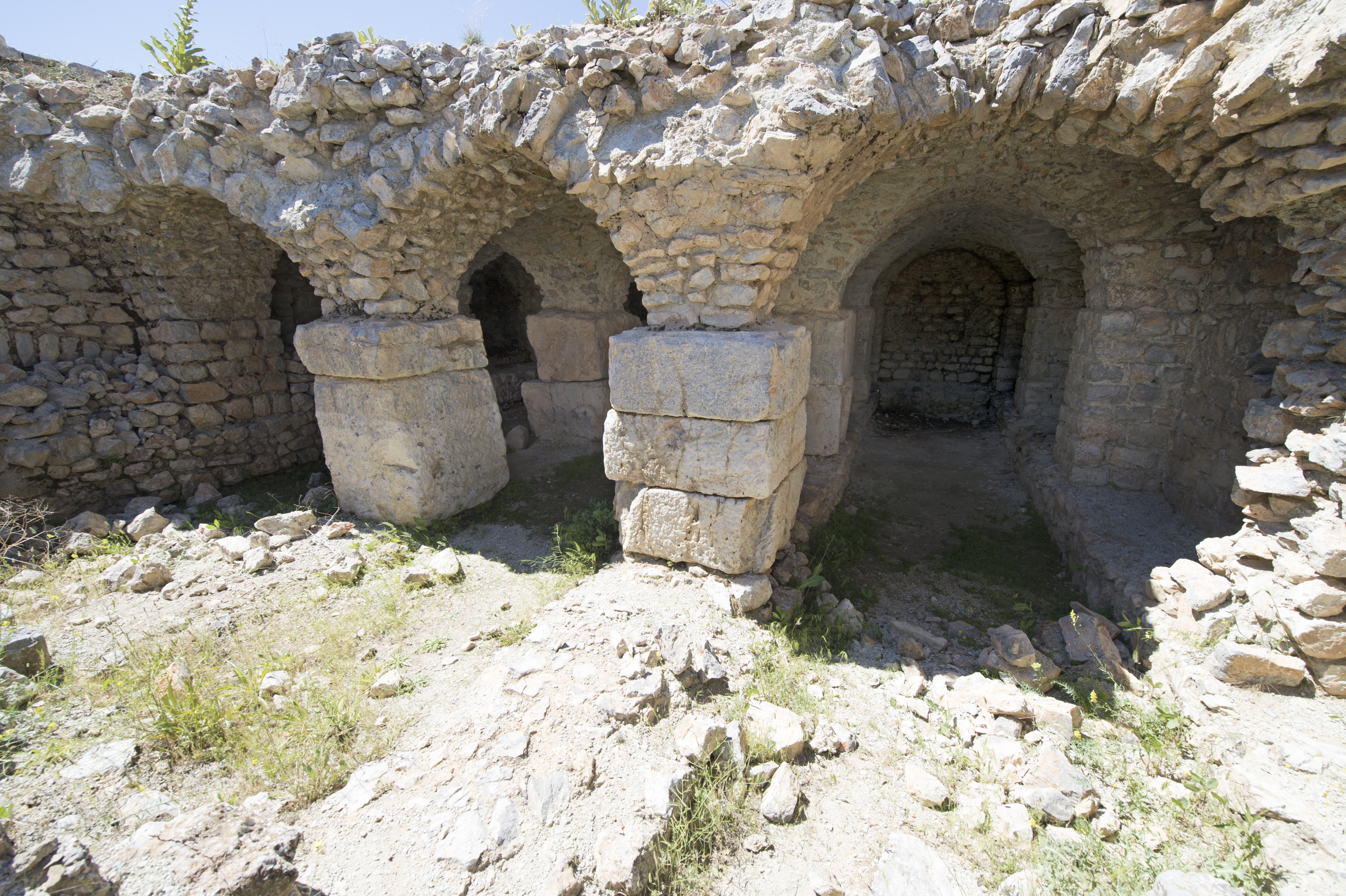
Antioch of Pisidia Roman Bath (or not)

The bath lies at the northwest corner of the city and the building did not receive much interest from researchers over the last 150 years. Most of them identified the building as an arched, colossal complex but none of them had anything to say about the function of the building. Seven section of the building have been unearthed by the excavations directed by Taşlıalan in recent years, but an important part of the complex, which is 70x55 m, is still buried and the plan is not yet clear. There is still some uncertainty whether the building is in fact a bath or not.

For example, because of sun and wind factors, the entrances to bath-houses in Anatolia were made on the south or east sides, but here the situation is different, the entrances are on the west and north-west sides. Also there are not clear traces of a water supply and heating system and in this situation the building rather looks like the lower part of a huge building that bore a massive structure above on its strong arches. Also because of the slope of the area on which it is constructed, the arches provide a solution so that the complex looks like the foundations for a building on a slope. For instance at Pergamon the same remedy was used for the Trajaneum.

But until further excavations prove the contrary the building can be accepted as a bath house which it resembles.

Treating it as a bath, the building is a reasonable distance from the nympheum. The exterior of the walls of the building on the north side are similar to the semi-circular fortifications of the western city walls. So it is possible that the massive external walls of the structure were also used for fortification in an as yet unrecognized plan and the small entrance in the north wall was used for the supply of wood needed for heating. The stonemasonship of the building is the strongest work visible at Antioch and it looks as if it will keep the building standing for many thousand years yet to come.

In the rooms cleared during the excavations it is understood that some places were filled deliberately. The style of the blocked and mortar-filled walls show the techniques of different centuries and show that the building was used over an extended period and possibly for different purposes also.

The court which is 38 by 29 m, identified as a palaestra, at the east side of the complex is connected to the building in an organic way. The court is surrounded with a colonaded-portico but the plan is not yet clear.

In one room, the remains of a floor heating system (Hypocaust) is visible as baked-clay tubes and rectangular brick-columns, but this would not reach the central heating oven of the building which should be at east or south side, if the building is a bath. It will be possible to understand the functions and phases of the building by continuing the excavations and in this situation the building may be comparable with the bath-house of Sagalassos in Pisidia which is 80x55 m. The beginning of the building phases can be dated to the first half of the 1st century AD. like the aqueduct and nympheum.

== Stadium ==
Outside the late period defence walls and opposite the Great Basilica, a small valley can be discerned. It has been recognized as a stadium only recently. The building blocks have all gone but traces of a U-shaped stadium c. 190x30 m for athletic games and competitions can be seen.

== The great basilica ==
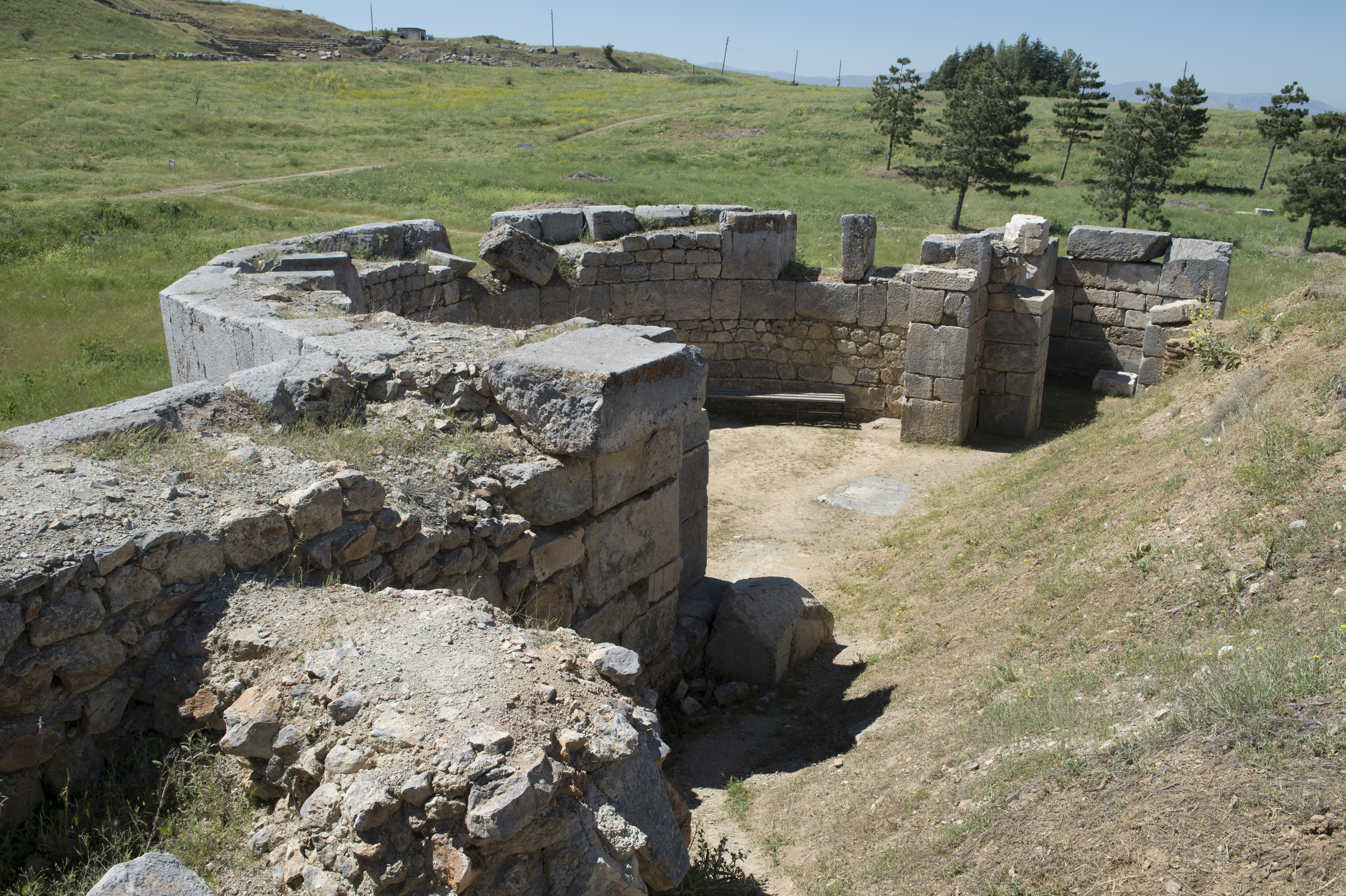
Antioch of Pisidia St. Paul's

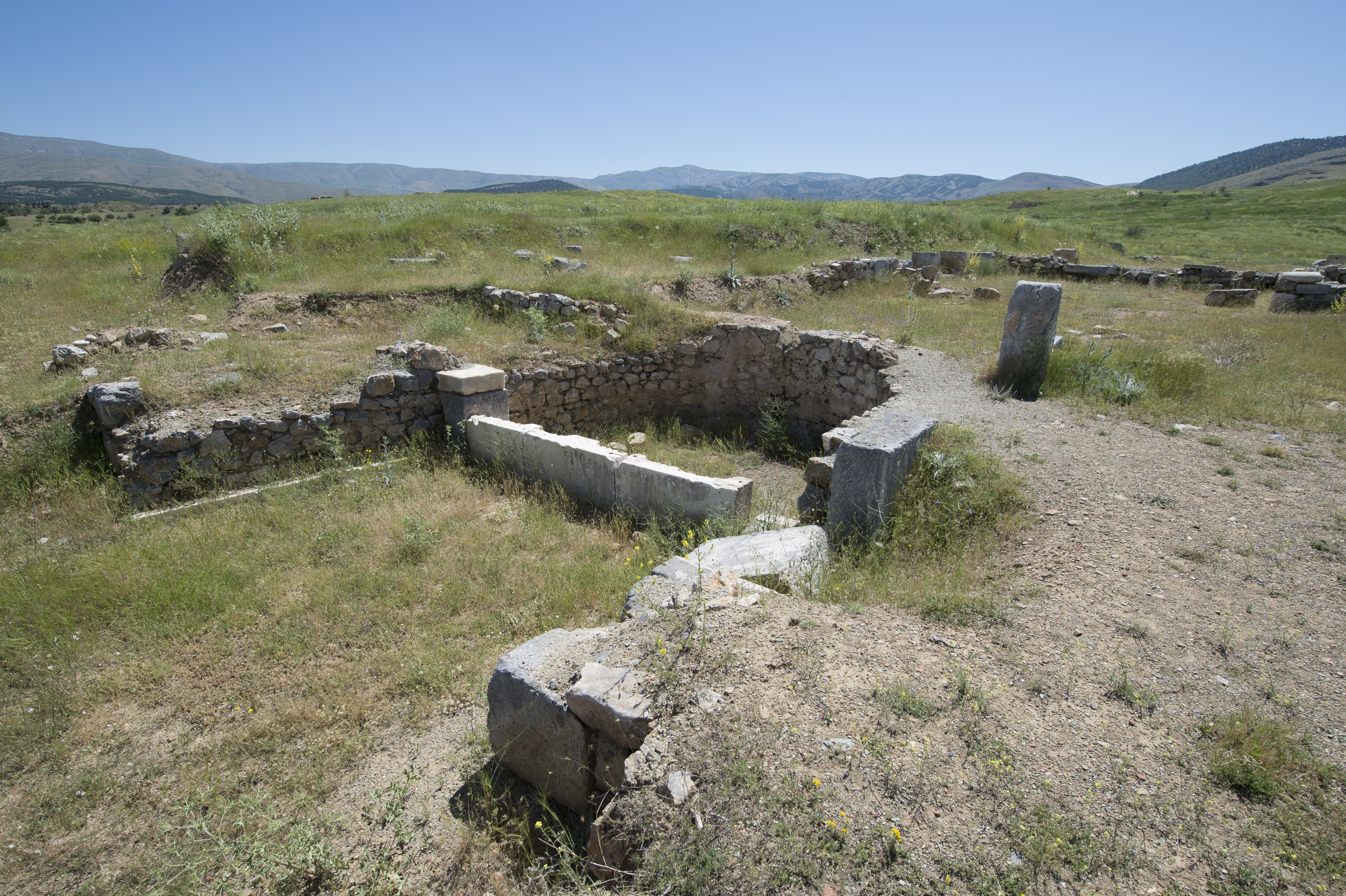
Antioch of Pisidia Fountain at St. Paul's

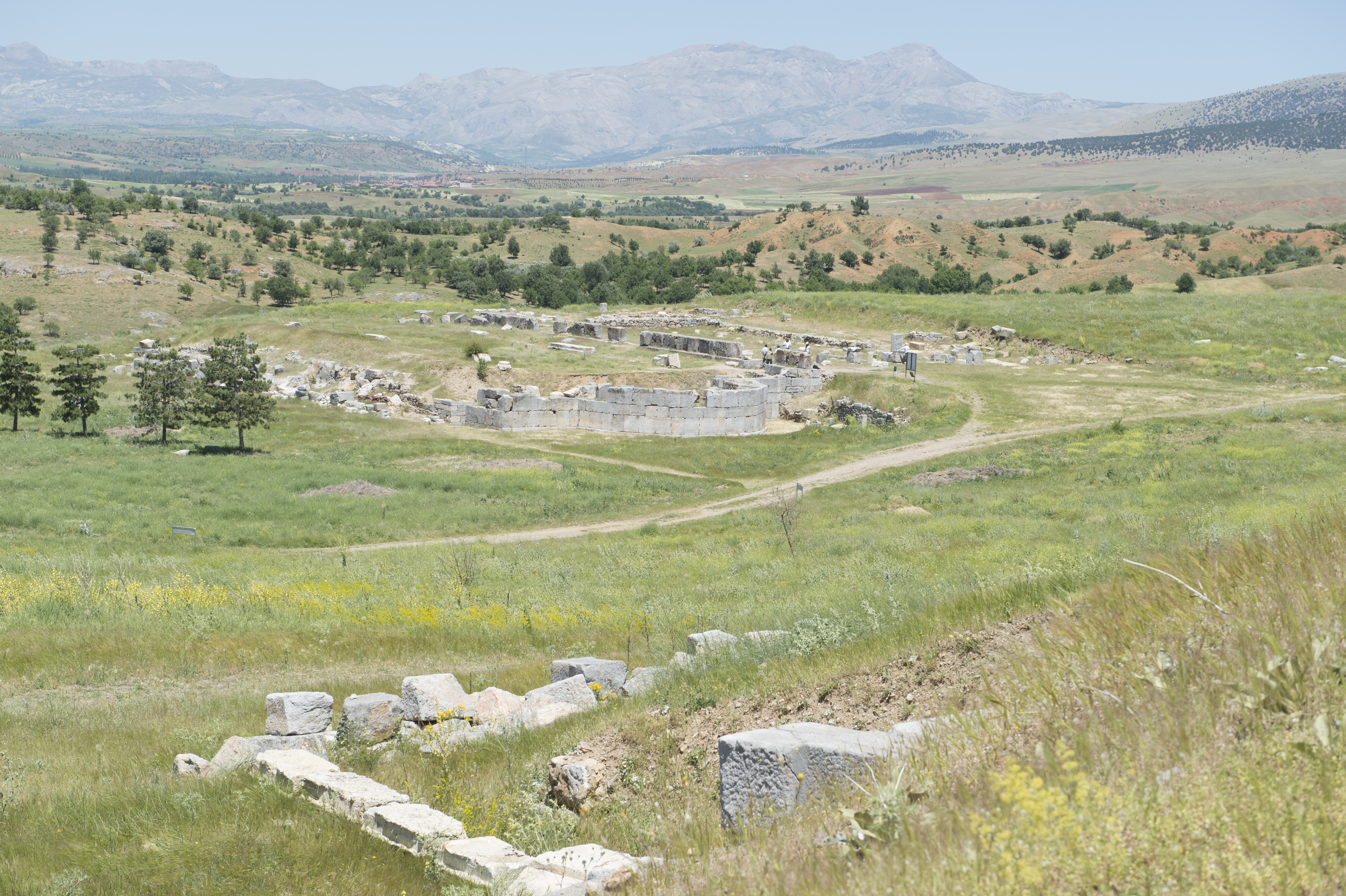
Antioch in Pisidia St. Paul's from theatre

One of the most important building complexes of Antioch is the Great Basilica in the northwest of the city, close to the outer walls. Arundell first identified the building as a basilica and the plan published by him became a guide for subsequent researchers. The Basilica was excavated first in 1924 by the Michigan team and it was then buried again for 80 years until the outside of the building was cleared by Taşlıalan who has most recently made a sondage in the apse.

The building lies in the east–west direction and is 70 by 27 m The narthex which is 27 by 13 m bears against the defence walls. The format reflects all the specifications of a basilica with an apse, a large nave in the middle and two narrow ones at the sides. The outer wall of the apse is of hectagonal plan.

The basilica shows changes to its plan over time. Possibly at the end of the 4th century the apse and naves were filled up to the level of the floor visible today and the filled area was pressed and covered with mosaics. Three new entrances were added to the building on the north side in this phase and the courtyard on the north side also dated to this period. The central axis of the basilica is different from the central axis of the mosaic floor, showing changes of structure. The mosaic which was unearthed by Robinson's team is covered with c. 30 cm of earth today, and 1924 photographs show that it was of geometrical floral motives in rectangular frames.

In the central nave at the beginning of the apse where there should be an altar a mosaic inscription was found giving the name of Bishop Optimus who represented Antioch at the Council of Constantinople in 381. This date is at the beginning of the building of basilical churches in Asia Minor. It also consolidates the dating of the Great Basilica. So, the Great Basilica of Antioch is known as one of the two earliest examples of Early Christian churches in Anatolia. The other example is in another Antioch on the Orontes (Hatay) dedicated to St. Babylas in Daphne.

The apse is 10.8 m in diameter and the central nave is separated by two rows of 13 columns standing on hectagonal bases. Beneath the filling, there are earlier construction phases of the naves. The recent sondage shows traces of an arched foundation on both sides. Possibly the second floor was carried on this. These vaults were subsequently filled and the columns of the Optimus phase erected on this filled surface. Three gates were added to the north wall of which the central one is 4 m wide and two were added to the south wall. The northern entrances open onto the central ceremonial court which is surrounded with an L–shaped portico. All the material of this court is reused from earlier buildings. In the north of the court a baptistery pool was added to the basilical complex and the foundations of a mosaic paved building beside the pool may possibly be a bishops residence.

There is no church comparable to the basilica in Pisidia and it is earlier than the churches of Sagalassos, Thekla, Anabarzus and Korykos. Evidence from the late 4th century like the enlarged theatre, a new agora, enlarged fortifications show that the city had one of its most brilliant eras at the beginning of the 5th century.

Dr.Taşlıalan identified the Great Basilica as the "Church of St.Paul" by means of an altar which was found in Yalvaç market place and he claims that the wall foundations at the south side of the basilica belong to the synagogue where St.Paul first preached to the Gentiles.

The altar is dated to the 6th century and the rough inscription is easily readable as "AGIOS PAULOS". W.M. Calder is the first who mentions this altar, found in the Yalvaç Baths, in his reports of 1911 and he said it could be belong to an unknown Church of St.Paul. Podromos, the Greek guide of Calder, was the first man who translated the inscription on the altar.

It is not clear if the basilica was used for another purpose in its earlier levels. Conservation and lifting of the mosaics will give opportunities to go deeper into the naves of Optimus and this will shed further light on this important Antioch building.

== The sanctuary of Men Askaenos ==
A sanctuary exists on the neighbouring hill east of Antioch, which is about 1600 m high, that 6 km away from Antioch(3.5 km as the crow flies) dedicated to one of the mystic gods of Anatolia: Men Askaenos. The hill is known as Gemen Korusu (grove of Gemen) or Karakuyu (blackwell, because of a dried spring beside a church from the times of the Byzantine Empire). Even today the hill is rendered attractive by means of the sacred trees of the Father God(Patrios Theos)of Antioch, pine trees. The sanctuary was founded on a high hill to see the Beyşehir Lake in southeast, Eğirdir Lake in southwest and the territory of Antioch 400 meters below.

At the beginning of the 20th century, the discoverer of Antioch wondered about the sanctuary that Strabo mentions in his Geography, and Ramsay's team found a sacred processional road with votive steles on either side leading up to the sanctuary. And the researchers met there with a temple in a temenos, another smaller one, a stadion, andron, ceremonial hall, Byzantine church and house-shaped unidentified buildings. Inscriptions indicate that a strong cult of a local belief reigned in sanctuary in a long period between the 4th century BC and 4th century AD. Many of them are carved directly on the walls of the temple with very distinctive lunar signs.

Ramsay and Hardie identified the Temple of Men as a "Great Altar" maybe from its similarity to Pergamon Altar. The next year they recognized the building and identified as "an unusual shaped small temple".

On temenos walls especially on the south –southwest side that looks to Antioch they discovered many inscriptions on votive steles dedicated to Men begging help, health, protection; telling sins, dreams, wishing forgiving and giving thanks, shortly shared lives with the Patrios Theos.

The temple is a peripteral Ionic ordered temple with 11x6 columns. The measures are 31x17.4 in podium base and 25x12.5 on the podium. There are 10 steps in southwest–northwest sides and 6 steps in southeast–northeast sides of the podium.

The site and other buildings are in a bad condition. Although it has been surveyed, the site has not been excavated yet. With the growth of Christianity, sites of local polytheistic religions of Anatolia and imported cults like emperors were systematically damaged in the 4th century. This is why even plan specifications of the buildings cannot be clearly seen in the present day.

== Yalvaç museum ==
Continuing research in the area makes Yalvaç a centre for interest in the Pisidian Region. Even from the early years of the last century research and excavations led to the need for a museum. Some early finds went to the Museum at Konya. The artifacts that were found in the American excavations were at first kept in the High School, but as the natives started to bring many different objects there, it became necessary to build a museum in Yalvaç. In 1947 even the excavations stopped for this coming inflating objects a storage room built.

For some time objects were displayed in Yalvaç Public Library but the need continues and the present building was started in 1963 and finished in 1966. The museum consisting of a Prehistoric hall, a classical hall, an ethnographic hall, with the garden in the centre, and is open every day, except Monday, between 08.30 and 17.30.

=== The Pre-History Hall ===
Just at the left side of the entrance, fossil finds are on display, which were found at Tokmacık (a small town 17 km from Yalvaç). They are the remains of several mammals belonging to the Late Miocene Era, 7 million to 8 million years old.

In continuous windows, early Bronze Age finds by villagers and surveyors who explored around the 17 prehistoric-settled mounds of the Yalvaç region are on display. These objects, baked clay cups and jars, several stone objects, axes, weights, seals, and figurines reflect the characteristic style of the Lake District.

=== The Classical Hall ===
This hall is in the central part of the museum and mostly contains finds from the excavations at Antioch. On display are statues, statue fragments, portraits and reliefs, all reflecting the culture of a Roman colony that melded in Anatolian pot.

Objects of daily use, such as jars, jewellery, perfume bottles, terracotta and bronze figurines together with marble statuettes, votive steles from the Men Sanctuary, and early examples of Christian crosses are on display.

=== Ethnographic Hall ===
Some beautiful examples of Turkish culture, which had settled in Yalvaç from the 12th century, are exhibited in this gallery. Particularly impressive are the carved wooden chimneys, ceilings, doors and wardrobes. In other cabinets, objects of daily use, such as dresses, jewellery, weapons, and medals are on display.

=== The Garden ===
This contains some representative examples of architecture from the site of Antioch together with many stones found in Yalvaç and its surroundings.

The development of the museum is continued by research. There is now a need for a larger museum for the display of objects in storage. The coins, manuscripts, weapons, reliefs and statue fragments are still waiting to be exhibited in new galleries.

== Surrounding villages ==
It is believed that the villages around Yalvaç may have lineage of the ancient city of Antiochia in Psidia. An English explorer named Mitchell Ramsay drew a link to the workers class ancient ionian settlers in the region to the village of Manarga in the vicinity of Yalvaç. He assumed the name of this village to be 'man-arga' or meaning 'worker folk' in ancient Anatolian Greek. Their deity was Hephaestus, the god of all skilful things and labour-saving devices. This village has been renamed Dedeçam. Ramsay speaks of two other settler folk named Geleontes and Aigikoreis, being farmers and priests respectively.

In addition, there are two other villages in the vicinity of the village of Manarga, which are Gelemi/Gelegemi and Oekuenes. These villages are at 1 km distance from each other, and their names strikingly reveal similarities with the Geleontes (farm folk) and the Aigikoreis (priests). In the village of Oekuenes, which is situated on top of a hill, there is an old sand road leading towards Yalvaç, and thus may have been used in antiquity to go to the ancient city of Antiochia in Pisidia. The city centre of the village of Manargs has a very high hill, and there have been found ancient human bones in the vicinity.

Ramsey speaks of a fourth ionian settler tribe, namely the hoplites (soldiers), and mentions that Antioch in Pisidia was a garrison city to hold off invasions from native non-Greeks. It is highly likely that the soldiers that defended Pisidia in Antioch were actually living in the city or in the immediate vicinity.

On the southeast end of the village of Manarga there was recently discovered a small tunnel and researchers concluded that this tunnel was a waterway originating directly from lake Egirdir. This is a characteristic ancient Greek watertunnel known as an orygma amphistomon. There are several water-tunnels originating from lake Egirdir to several villages in the vicinity. This confirms that the village of Manarga is indeed an ancient village.
