= Pisidia =

Region of ancient Asia Minor

Coordinates: 37.3°N 30.3°E

Πισιδία (Greek)
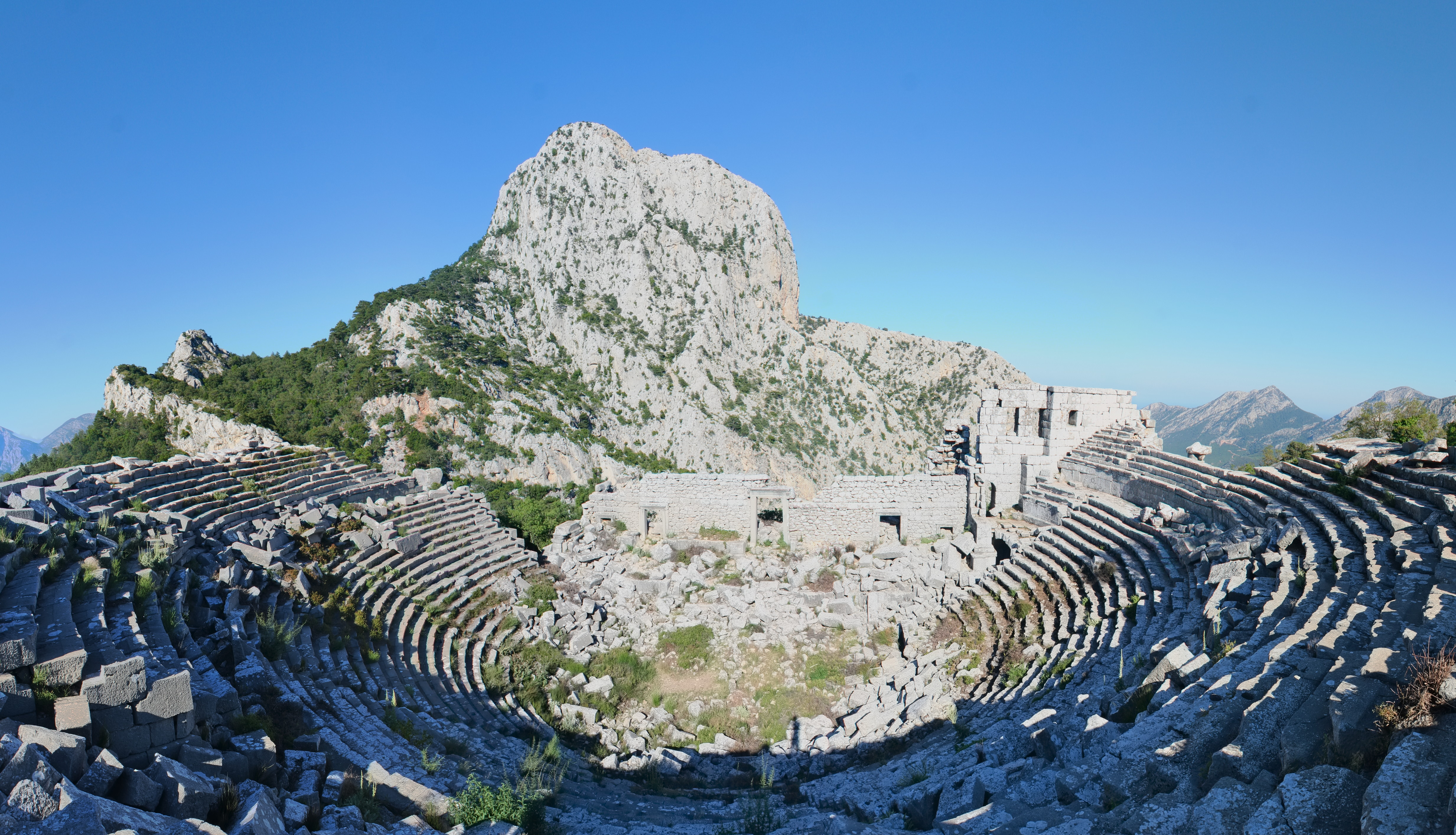
- Theatre of Termessos
- Location: Southwestern Anatolia (modern-day Antalya, Turkey)
- Language: Pisidian
- Notable cities: Termessos, Sagalassos
- Roman province: Asia, Galatia
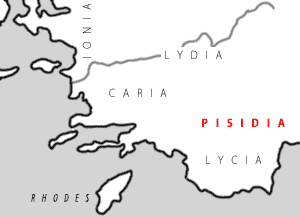
- Map of Pisidia along the Anatolian coast of the Eastern Mediterranean

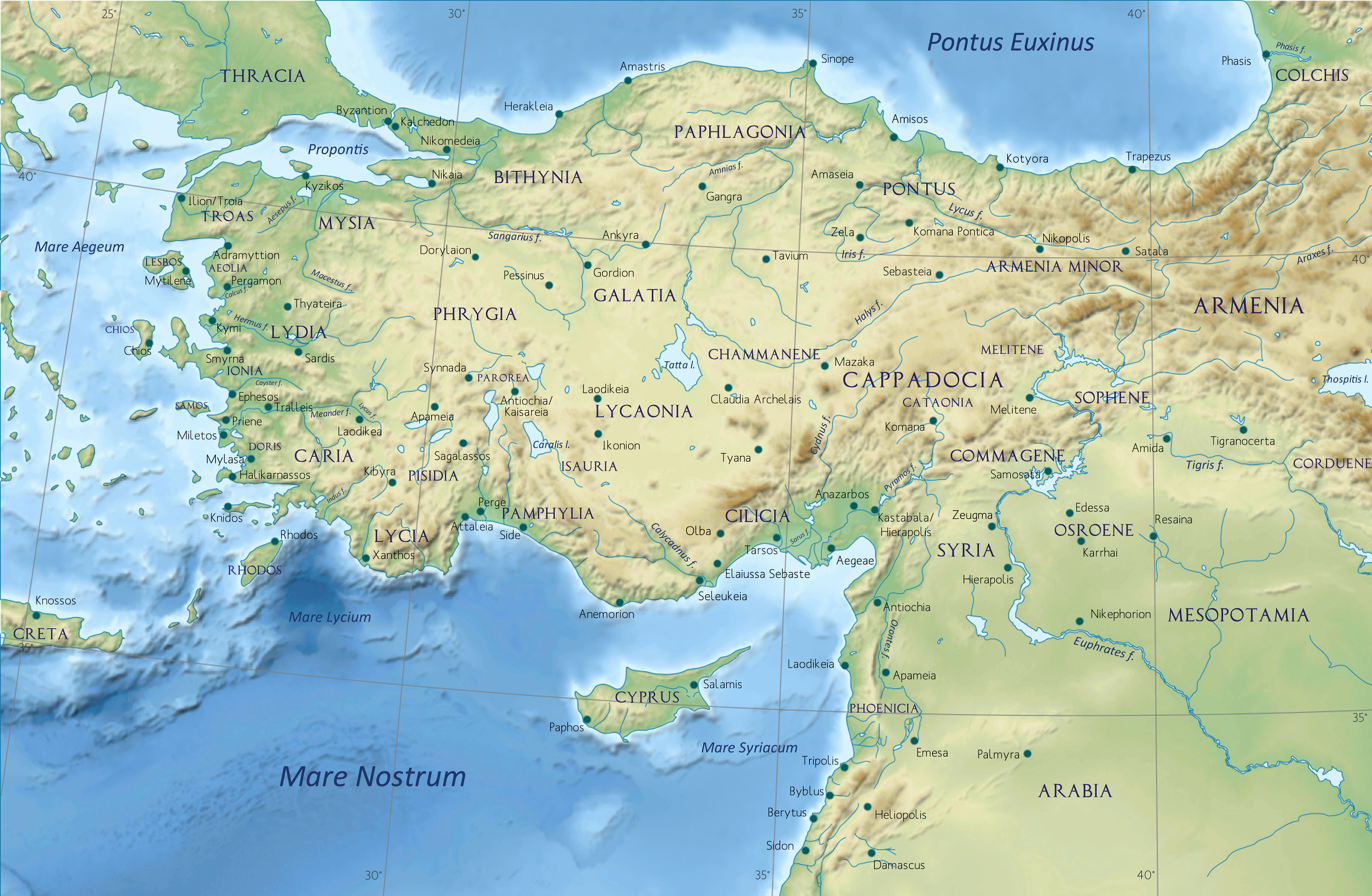
Greco-Roman Asia Minor, including Pisidia.

Pisidia or Pisidya (/pɪˈsɪdiə/; Greek: Πισιδία) was an ancient Anatolian region located north of Pamphylia, northeast of Lycia, west of Isauria and Cilicia, and south of Phrygia, corresponding roughly to the modern-day Antalya Province of the Republic of Turkey. Among Pisidia's settlements were Antioch in Pisidia, Termessos, Cremna, Sagalassos, Etenna, Neapolis, Selge, Tyriacum, Laodiceia Katakekaumene, Adada, and Philomelium.

== Geography ==
Although Pisidia is close to the Mediterranean Sea, the warm climate of the south cannot pass the height of the Taurus Mountains. The climate is too dry for timberland, but crop plants grow in areas provided with water from the mountains, whose annual average rainfall is around 1000 mm on the peaks and 500 mm on the slopes. This water feeds the plateau. The Pisidian cities, mostly founded on the slopes, benefited from this fertility. The irrigated soil is very suitable for growing fruit and for husbandry.

== History ==
=== Prehistoric era ===
The area of Pisidia has been inhabited since the Paleolithic, with some settlements known from historical times ranging in age from the eighth to third millennium BC.

=== Ancient era ===
==== Late Bronze Age and Iron Age ====
The ancestors of the classical Pisidians were likely present in the region before the 14th century BC, when Hittite records refer to a mountain site of "Salawassa", identified with the later site of Sagalassos. At that time, Pisidia appears to have been part of the region the Hittites called Arzawa. The Pisidian language is poorly known, but is assumed to be a member of the Anatolian branch of Indo-European languages.

There is a lacuna (gap) in the text of Herodotus (7.76), but it is doubtful to surmise a reference to the Pisidians in that passage. There can be little doubt that the Pisidians and Pamphylians were the same people, but a distinction between the two seems to have been established at an early period. Herodotus, who does not mention the Pisidians, enumerates the Pamphylians among the nations of Asia Minor, while Ephorus mentions them both, correctly including the one among the nations on the interior, the other among those of the coast. Pamphylia early received colonies from Greece and other lands, and from this cause, combined with the greater fertility of their territory, became more civilized than its neighbor in the interior. Pisidia remained a wild, mountainous region, and one of the most difficult for outside powers to rule.

==== Lydian and Persian periods ====
As far back as the Hittite period, Pisidia was host to independent communities not under the Hittite yoke. Known for its warlike factions, it remained largely independent of the Lydians, and even the Persians, who conquered Anatolia in the 6th century BC, and divided the area into satrapies for greater control, were unable to cope with constant uprisings and turmoil.

==== Hellenistic period ====
Alexander the Great had a somewhat better fortune, conquering Sagalassos on his way to Persia, though the city of Termessos defied him. After Alexander died, the region became part of territories of Antigonus Monophthalmus, and possibly Lysimachus of Thrace, after which Seleucus I Nicator, founder of the Seleucid Dynasty of Syria, took control of Pisidia. Under the Seleucids, Greek colonies were founded at strategically important places. Even so, the Hellenistic kings were never in complete control, in part because Anatolia was contested between the Seleucids, the Attalids of Pergamon, and the Galatians, invading Celts from Europe. The cities in Pisidia were among the last in western Anatolia to fully adopt Greek culture and to coin their own money.

Pisidia officially passed from the Seleucids to the Attalids as a result of the Treaty of Apamea, forced on Antiochos III of Syria by the Romans in 188 BC. After Attalos III, the last king of Pergamon, bequeathed his kingdom to Rome in 133 BC as the province of Asia, Pisidia was given to the Kingdom of Cappadocia, which proved unable to govern it. The Pisidians cast their lot with pirate-dominated Cilicia and Pamphylia until the Roman rule was restored in 102 BC.

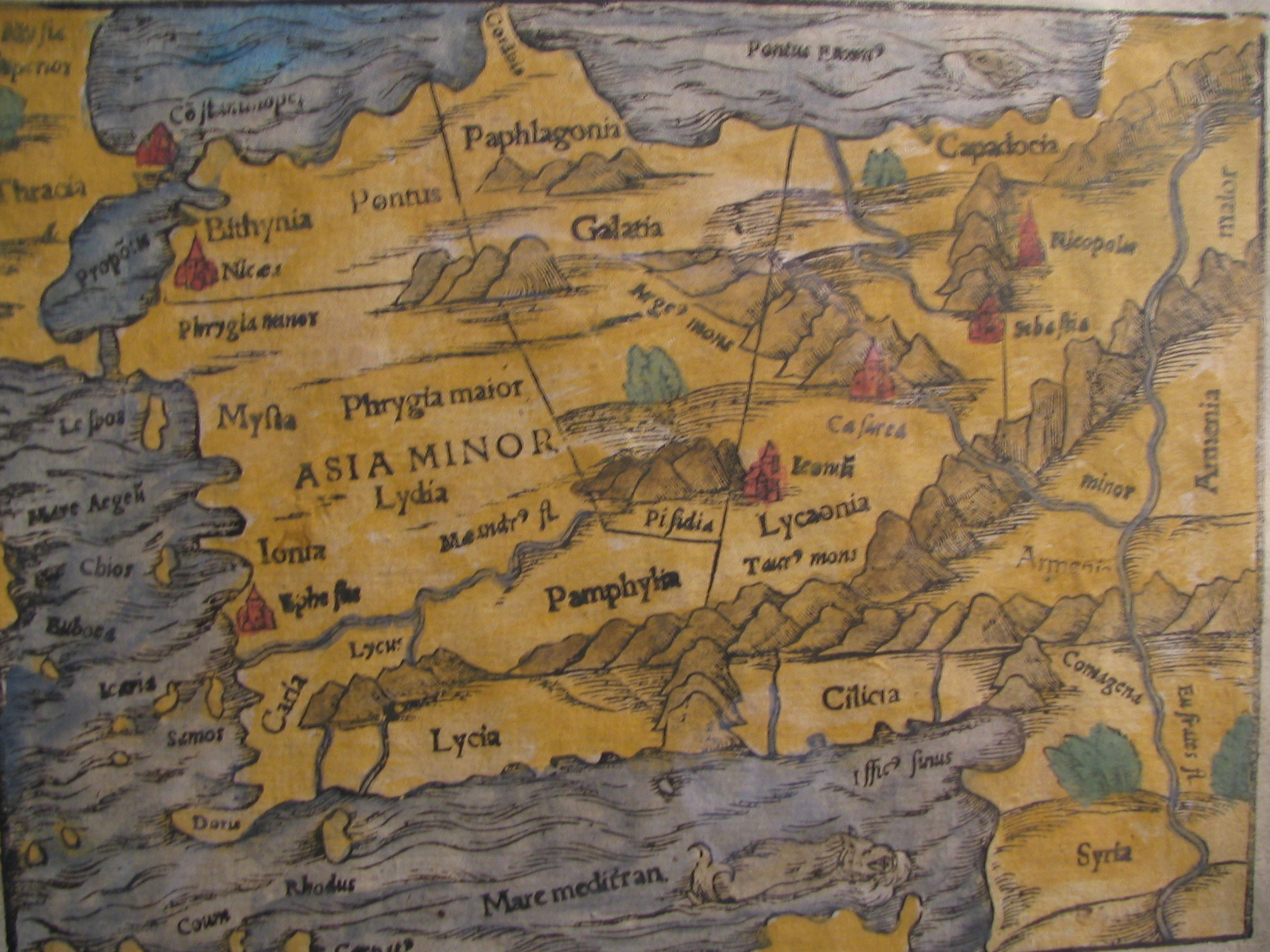
A 15th-century map showing Pisidia

In 39 BC Marcus Antonius entrusted Pisidia to the Galatian client king Amyntas and charged him with suppressing a people of the Taurus Mountains known as the Homonadesians, who sometimes controlled the roads connecting Pisidia to Pamphylia.

==== Roman period ====
After king Amyntas of Galatia was killed in the struggle in 25 BC, Rome made Pisidia part of the new province of Galatia. The Homonadesians were finally wiped out in 3 BC.

During the Roman period Pisidia was colonized with veterans of its legions to maintain control. For the colonists, who came from poorer parts of Italy, agriculture must have been the area's main attraction. Under Augustus, eight such colonies were established in Pisidia, and Antioch and Sagalassos became the most important cities. The province was gradually Latinised. Latin remained the formal language of the area until the end of the 3rd century.

=== Medieval era ===
==== Byzantine period ====
Pisidia became an important early Christian centre. Paul the Apostle preached in Antioch on his first journey. He also visited the area in his second and third journeys. After the Emperor Constantine's legalization of Christianity in 311, Antioch in Pisidia (which has various namesakes, including the Patriarchate in Syria) played an important role as the Christian metropolitan see as well as being the capital of the civil province of Pisidia. Most Pisidian cities were heavily fortified at that time due to civil wars and foreign invasions.

==== Muslim period ====
The area was devastated by an earthquake in 518, a plague around 541–543, and another earthquake and Arab raids in the middle of the 7th century. After the Muslim conquest of Syria disrupted the trade routes, the area declined in importance. In the 8th century the raids increased. In the 11th century the Seljuk Turks captured the area and founded the Seljuk Sultanate in Central Anatolia. Pisidia frequently changed hands between the Byzantine Empire and the Turks. In 1176, Sultan Kılıçarslan defeated Manuel Komnenos in the Battle of Myriocephalon (thousand heads).

== Notable people ==
- George of Pisidia, 7th-century Byzantine poet

== See also ==
- Ancient regions of Anatolia
- Pisidian language
