= List of populated places in Isparta Province =

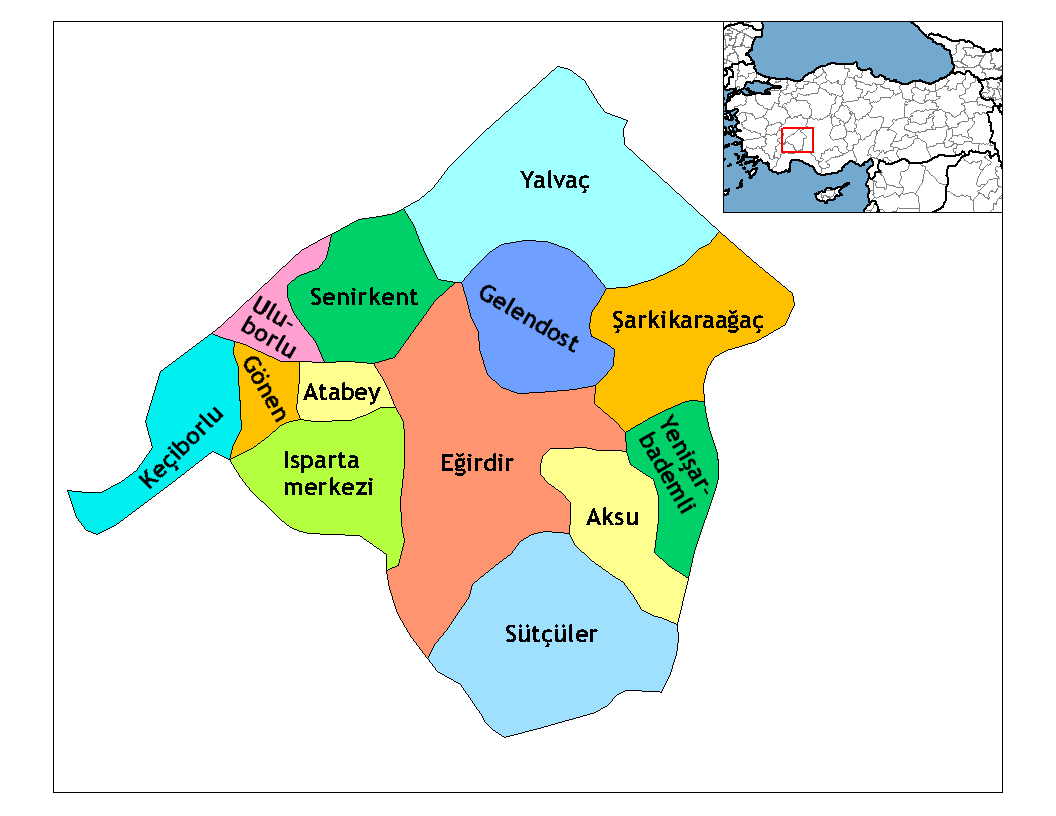
Isparta Province

Below is the list of populated places in Isparta Province, Turkey by the districts. In the following lists first place in each list is the administrative center of the district.

== Isparta ==
- Isparta
- Aliköy, Isparta
- Bozanönü, Isparta
- Büyükgökçeli, Isparta
- Büyükhacılar, Isparta
- Çobanisa, Isparta
- Çukurköy, Isparta
- Darıderesi, Isparta
- Darıören, Isparta
- Deregümü, Isparta
- Direkli, Isparta
- Gelincik, Isparta
- Güneyce, Isparta
- Kadılar, Isparta
- Kayıköy, Isparta
- Kışlaköy, Isparta
- Kuleönü, Isparta
- Küçükgökçeli, Isparta
- Küçükhacılar, Isparta
- Küçükkışla, Isparta
- Savköy, Isparta
- Yakaören, Isparta
- Yazısöğüt, Isparta

== Aksu ==
- Aksu
- Eldere, Aksu
- Elecik, Aksu
- Karacahisar, Aksu
- Karağı, Aksu
- Katip, Aksu
- Koçular, Aksu
- Kösre, Aksu
- Sofular, Aksu
- Terziler, Aksu
- Yaka, Aksu
- Yakaafşar, Aksu
- Yılanlı, Aksu
- Yukarıyaylabel, Aksu

== Atabey ==
- Atabey
- Bayat, Atabey
- Harmanören, Atabey
- İslamköy, Atabey
- Kapıcak, Atabey
- Pembeli, Atabey

== Eğirdir ==
- Eğirdir
- Ağılköy, Eğirdir
- Akbelenli, Eğirdir
- Akdoğan, Eğirdir
- Akpınar, Eğirdir
- Aşağı Gökdere, Eğirdir
- Bademli, Eğirdir
- Bağıcık, Eğirdir
- Bağıllı, Eğirdir
- Bağören, Eğirdir
- Balkırı, Eğirdir
- Barla, Eğirdir
- Beydere, Eğirdir
- Çay, Eğirdir
- Eyüpler, Eğirdir
- Gökçehöyük, Eğirdir
- Havutlu, Eğirdir
- Kırıntı, Eğirdir
- Mahmatlar, Eğirdir
- Pazarköy, Eğirdir
- Sarıidris, Eğirdir
- Serpil, Eğirdir
- Sevinçbey, Eğirdir
- Sipahiler, Eğirdir
- Sorkuncak, Eğirdir
- Tepeli, Eğirdir
- Yılgıncak, Eğirdir
- Yukarı Gökdere, Eğirdir
- Yuvalı, Eğirdir

== Gelendost ==
- Gelendost
- Afşar, Gelendost
- Akdağ, Gelendost
- Bağıllı, Gelendost
- Balcı, Gelendost
- Çaltı, Gelendost
- Esinyurt, Gelendost
- Hacılar, Gelendost
- Keçili, Gelendost
- Köke, Gelendost
- Madenli, Gelendost
- Yaka, Gelendost
- Yenice, Gelendost
- Yeşilköy, Gelendost

== Gönen ==
- Gönen
- Gölbaşı, Gönen
- Gümüşgün, Gönen
- Güneykent, Gönen
- İğdecik, Gönen
- Kızılcık, Gönen
- Koçtepe, Gönen
- Senirce, Gönen

== Keçiborlu ==
- Keçiborlu
- Ardıçlı, Keçiborlul
- Aydoğmuş, Keçiborlul
- Çukurören, Keçiborlul
- Gülköy, Keçiborlul
- İncesu, Keçiborlul
- Kaplanlı, Keçiborlul
- Kavakköy, Keçiborlul
- Kılıç, Keçiborlul
- Kozluca, Keçiborlul
- Kuyucak, Keçiborlul
- Özbahçe, Keçiborlul
- Saracık, Keçiborlul
- Senir, Keçiborlul
- Yenitepe, Keçiborlul
- Yeşilyurt, Keçiborlul

== Senirkent ==
- Senirkent
- Akkeçili, Senirkent
- Başköy, Senirkent
- Büyükkabaca, Senirkent
- Gençali, Senirkent
- Karip, Senirkent
- Ortayazı, Senirkent
- Uluğbey, Senirkent
- Yassıören, Senirkent

== Sütçüler ==
- Sütçüler
- Ayvalıpınar, Sütçüler
- Aşağıyaylabel, Sütçüler
- Bekirağalar, Sütçüler
- Belence, Sütçüler
- Beydili, Sütçüler
- Boğazköy, Sütçüler
- Bucakdere, Sütçüler
- Çukurca, Sütçüler
- Çandır, Sütçüler
- Çobanisa, Sütçüler
- Darıbükü, Sütçüler
- Güldalı, Sütçüler
- Gümü, Sütçüler
- Hacıahmetler, Sütçüler
- Hacıaliler, Sütçüler
- İbişler, Sütçüler
- İncedere, Sütçüler
- Karadiken, Sütçüler
- Kasımlar, Sütçüler
- Kesme, Sütçüler
- Kuzca, Sütçüler
- Melikler, Sütçüler
- Müezzinler, Sütçüler
- Pınarköy, Sütçüler
- Sağrak, Sütçüler
- Saray, Sütçüler
- Sarımehmetler, Sütçüler
- Şehler, Sütçüler
- Yeniköy, Sütçüler
- Yeşilyurt, Sütçüler

== Şarkikaraağaç ==
- Şarkikaraağaç
- Arak, Şarkikaraağaç
- Armutlu, Şarkikaraağaç
- Aslandoğmuş, Şarkikaraağaç
- Aşağıdinek, Şarkikaraağaç
- Başdeğirmen, Şarkikaraağaç
- Belceğiz, Şarkikaraağaç
- Beyköy, Şarkikaraağaç
- Çaltı, Şarkikaraağaç
- Çarıksaraylar, Şarkikaraağaç
- Çavundur, Şarkikaraağaç
- Çeltek, Şarkikaraağaç
- Çiçekpınar, Şarkikaraağaç
- Fakılar, Şarkikaraağaç
- Gedikli, Şarkikaraağaç
- Göksöğüt, Şarkikaraağaç
- Karayaka, Şarkikaraağaç
- Kıyakdede, Şarkikaraağaç
- Köprü, Şarkikaraağaç
- Muratbağı, Şarkikaraağaç
- Ördekci, Şarkikaraağaç
- Örenköy, Şarkikaraağaç
- Salur, Şarkikaraağaç
- Sarıkaya, Şarkikaraağaç
- Yakaemir, Şarkikaraağaç
- Yassıbel, Şarkikaraağaç
- Yenicekale, Şarkikaraağaç
- Yeniköy, Şarkikaraağaç
- Yukarıdinek, Şarkikaraağaç

== Uluborlu ==
- Uluborlu
- Dere, Uluborlu
- İleydağı, Uluborlu
- İnhisar, Uluborlu
- Küçükkabaca, Uluborlu

== Yalvaç ==
- Yalvaç
- Akçaşar, Yalvaç
- Altıkapı, Yalvaç
- Aşağıkaşıkara, Yalvaç
- Aşağıtırtar, Yalvaç
- Ayvalı, Yalvaç
- Bağlarbaşı, Yalvaç
- Bağkonak, Yalvaç
- Bahtiyar, Yalvaç
- Celeptaş, Yalvaç
- Çakırçal, Yalvaç
- Çamharman, Yalvaç
- Çetince, Yalvaç
- Dedeçam, Yalvaç
- Eğirler, Yalvaç
- Eyüpler, Yalvaç
- Hisarardı, Yalvaç
- Gökçeali, Yalvaç
- Hüyüklü, Yalvaç
- İleği, Yalvaç
- Koruyaka, Yalvaç
- Kozluçay, Yalvaç
- Körküler, Yalvaç
- Kumdanlı, Yalvaç
- Kurusarı, Yalvaç
- Kuyucak, Yalvaç
- Mısırlı, Yalvaç
- Özbayat, Yalvaç
- Özgüney, Yalvaç
- Sağır, Yalvaç
- Sücüllü, Yalvaç
- Taşevi, Yalvaç
- Terziler, Yalvaç
- Tokmacık, Yalvaç
- Yağcılar, Yalvaç
- Yarıkkaya, Yalvaç
- Yukarıkaşıkara, Yalvaç
- Yukarıtırtar, Yalvaç

== Yenişarbademli ==
- Yenişarbademli
- Gölkonak, Yenişarbademli
