= List of municipalities in Isparta Province =

This is the List of municipalities in Isparta Province, Turkey as of March 2023.

District	Municipality
Aksu	Aksu
Atabey	Atabey
Eğirdir	Eğirdir
Eğirdir	Sarıidris
Gelendost	Gelendost
Gönen	Gönen
Gönen	Güneykent
Isparta	Isparta
Isparta	Kuleönü
Isparta	Savköy
Keçiborlu	Keçiborlu
Keçiborlu	Senir
Şarkikaraağaç	Çarıksaraylar
Şarkikaraağaç	Çiçekpınar
Şarkikaraağaç	Şarkikaraağaç
Senirkent	Büyükkabaca
Senirkent	Senirkent
Sütçüler	Sütçüler
Uluborlu	Uluborlu
Yalvaç	Hüyüklü
Yalvaç	Yalvaç
Yenişarbademli	Yenişarbademli
