= List of canyons and gorges in Turkey =

This is a partial list of canyons and gorges in Turkey.

Canyon	Location	Stream	Length	Depth	Ref
Arapapıştı Canyon	Aydın	Akçay	6 km (3.7 mi)	380 m (1,250 ft)	
Cehennem Deresi Canyon	Artvin	Ardanuç Creek	2.5 km (1.6 mi)	200 m (660 ft)	
Çatak Canyon	Kastamonu				
Ersizlerdere Canyon	Kastamonu		2.5 km (1.6 mi)		
Gökçeler Canyon	Muğla, Milas		8 km (5.0 mi)		
Göksu Canyon	Mersin	Göksu			
Göynük Canyon	Antalya				
Güver Canyon	Antalya, Döşemealtı		2 km (1.2 mi)	115 m (377 ft)	
Harmankaya Canyon Nature Park	Bilecik, Yenipazar-İnhisar		3.9 km (2.4 mi)	300–600 m (980–1,970 ft)	
Horma Canyon	Kastamonu, Pınarbaşı	Zarı Creek			
Ihlara Canyon	Aksaray, Güzelyurt	lavlarla Creek, Melendiz Creek	14 km (8.7 mi)	100–150 m (330–490 ft)	
İnceğiz Canyon	Denizli				
İncesu Canyon	Çorum Province	Çekerek River	13 km (8.1 mi)	200–300 m (660–980 ft)	
Kapıkaya Canyon	Adana, Karaisalı	Çakıt Creek			
Kapuz Canyon	Muğla		20 km (12 mi)		
Karanlık Canyon	Erzincan				
Kirpe Canyon	Düzce		16 km (9.9 mi)		
Kisecik Canyon	Mersin, Çamlıyayla				
Köprülü Canyon	Antalya	Köprüçay			
Lamas Canyon	Mersin, Erdemli				
Sadağı Canyon Nature Park	Bursa, Orhaneli		12 km (7.5 mi)		
Saklıkent National Park	Muğla, Fethiye				
Sansarak Canyon	Bursa, İznik		7 km (4.3 mi)		
Şahinderesi Canyon	Balıkesir		27 km (17 mi)		
Şehriban Canyon	Kastamonu, Şenpazar			1,000 m (3,300 ft)	
Ulubey Canyon Nature Park	Uşak, Ulubey				
Valla Canyon	Kastanonu, Pınarbaşı		12 km (7.5 mi)	800–1,200 m (2,600–3,900 ft)	
Yaka Canyon	Isparta			30–100 m (98–328 ft)	
Yazılı Canyon Nature Park	Isparta				
