= Siege of Sozopolis =

Coordinates: 38.073°N 30.467°E

- Part of the Byzantine–Seljuq wars
Date	1120
Location	Sozopolis, Pisidia (modern-day Uluborlu, Isparta, Turkey)
Result	Byzantine victory

Belligerents
Byzantine Empire	Seljuk Sultanate of Rûm

Commanders and leaders
John II Komnenos	Unknown

Casualties and losses
Unknown	Garrison killed, captured or routed

The siege of Sozopolis saw the Byzantine Empire conquest of the Seljuk dynasty-held town of Sozopolis in 1120, improving byzantine communications with the city of Attaleia.

== Background ==
After re-conquering the city of Laodicea from a Seljuk Turkish garrison of 700 men in 1119, the Byzantine emperor John II Komnenos continued his campaigns against the Turks in 1120 after a brief stay in Constantinople. The 1120 campaign target was the town of Sozopolis in Pisidia, which controlled the lines of communication to Attaleia.

== Siege ==
Sozopolis was protected by an armed garrison and steep hills. A large-scale siege attack was thus impossible. The town could only be attacked by small forces. John was initially at a loss how to proceed but later came up with a plan. He ordered a force of missile-armed cavalry under Paktiarios and Dekanos to attack the town gates and shoot at the Turkish soldiers manning the walls. The Turks took the bait and poured out of the gate. The Byzantine force then executed a planned retreat, drawing the Turks far out beyond the town. The rest of the Byzantine army had lain hidden in the thick undergrowth and assaulted the undefended town after the Turks had passed them. The fleeing Byzantines turned about and faced the pursuing Turks. The Turks were trapped between the Byzantine cavalry to their front and the army to their back and were largely killed or captured, with a handful making it out of the encirclement.

== Aftermath ==
Next, the fortress of Hierakokoryphitis capitulated to John without a fight, along with many other towns and fortifications near Attaleia, after which John returned to Constantinople.

=== Analysis ===
The combat at Sozopolis demonstrated the discipline of the Byzantine troops, who could feign flight without panicking. The Byzantine cavalry could fight effectively with both missile and close-combat weapons. John showed himself a competent general, carrying out a complex tactical maneuver at the very beginning of his reign.

== Citations ==
- Magoulias, Harry J., ed. (1984). O City of Byzantium: Annals of Niketas Choniatēs. Detroit: Wayne State University Press. ISBN 978-0-8143-1764-8.
- Birkenmeier, John W. (2002). The Development of the Komnenian Army: 1081-1180. Boston, Massachusetts: Brill. ISBN 90-04-11710-5.
