= Hadrianopolis =

Hadrianopolis or Adrianopolis (Greek: Ἁδριανούπολις Hadrianoupolis) may refer to several cities named after Hadrian:

== Europe ==
- Hadrianopolis, a former quarter of Athens, Greece; see Arch of Hadrian (Athens)
- Hadrianopolis in Epiro, a town and bishopric of ancient Epirus, now Albania
- Hadrianopolis in Haemimontus, a former name of Edirne, Turkey
- Hadrianopolis (Macedonia), a town of ancient Macedonia, Greece

== Asia ==
- Hadrianopolis in Caria or Stratonicea (Caria), a former name of Eskihisar, Turkey
- Hadrianopolis in Cilicia, a former name of Mersin, Turkey
- Hadrianopolis in Lycia, another name of Olympus (Lycia), Turkey
- Hadrianopolis in Lydia or Stratonicea (Lydia), a former name of Siledik, Turkey
- Hadrianopolis in Paphlagonia, a town and bishopric of ancient Paphlagonia and later Bithynia, now Turkey
- Hadrianopolis in Pisidia, a former name of Şarkikaraağaç, Turkey
- Hadrianopolis (Pisidia), a town of ancient Pisidia, now Turkey
- Hadrianopolis in Phrygia, a town and bishopric of ancient Phrygia, now Turkey
- Hadrianopolis in Pontus, a former name of Amasya, Turkey
- Hadrianopolis in Pontus, a former name of Niksar, Turkey
- Hadrianopolis in Syria, a former name of Palmyra, Syria

== Africa ==
- Hadrianopolis in Africa, a former name of Carthage, Tunisia
- Hadrianopolis in Cyrenaica, a former name of Deriana, Libya
