= Yaka Canyon =

Canyon in Isparta, Turkey

- Yaka Kanyonu
- Location within Turkey
- Length: ca.4 km (2.5 mi)
- Width: 1.5–2.5 m (4 ft 11 in – 8 ft 2 in)
- Depth: 30–100 m (98–328 ft)

Geography
- Location: Yaka village, Aksu, Isparta Province, Turkey
- Coordinates: 37.70074°N 31.24726°E
- Interactive map of Yaka Canyon

Yaka Canyon (Turkish: Yaka Kanyonu) is a deep steep-sided gorge located south of Yaka village in Isparta Province, southwestern Turkey.

Yaka Canyon is situated 4.5 km (2.8 mi) south of Yaka village in Aksu District, and north of Kızıldağ National Park within Isparta Province, southwestern Turkey. The village is reached leaving the Aksu-Yenişarbademli state road at 22 km (14 mi) southwards. Generally, the entrance to the canyon is from just below the Melikler Plateau.

The canyon is about 4 km (2.5 mi) long, and the steep and craggy cliff walls rise up between 30–100 m (98–328 ft) with a width varying between 1.5–2.5 m (4 ft 11 in – 8 ft 2 in). Snow waters of Anamas Mountain flow through the canyon. It features small waterfalls, natural ponds and rich vegetation, and is a habitat for bird and animal species, and colorful butterflies.

Crossing the canyon is not particularly dangerous or difficult as it is an easy route. There is no need for a lot of equipment, supplies, or knowledge. Wearing non-slip shoes are recommended, and a helmet is a must. A mountain bike tour around the canyon is recommended.

The commando specialization trainees of the Mountain Commando School and Training Center Command based in Isparta carry out part of their exercise in the Yaka Canyon.
