= Sozopolis =

Sozopolis may refer to:

- Sozopolis (Pisidia), a town in the late Roman province of Pisidia, in Asia Minor (present-day Turkey)
- Sozopolis (Thrace), a seaside city in ancient Thrace (present-day Bulgaria)
- Sozopolis in Haemimonto, a titular episcopal see of the Catholic Church, centered on Sozopolis, Thrace
