= Pınargözü Cave =

Cave in Turkey

- Pınargözü Mağarası
- Location within Turkey
- Location: Yenişarbademli, Isparta Province, Turkey
- Coordinates: 37°41′48″N 31°18′27″E
- Depth: 720 metres (2,362 ft)
- Length: 16 kilometres (10 mi)
- Height variation: 248 metres (814 ft)
- Elevation: 1,550 metres (5,085 ft)
- Discovery: 1964
- Geology: Limestone karst
- Entrances: 1
- Access: Restricted

Pınargözü Cave (Turkish: Pınargözü Mağarası, literally "eye of the water"), is a cave 18 kilometres (11 mi) west of the town of Yenişarbademli in Isparta Province, Turkey. It is considered the longest cave in Turkey, although it has not yet been fully explored, and the precise extent to which it has been explored is in dispute.

The entrance is on the slopes of Mount Dedegöl at an elevation of 1,550 metres (5,090 ft), in a forested area of the Kızıldağ National Park. It is easily recognized by the stream of water that pours continuously from its mouth, called the Devre Su. A constant wind of up to 166 km/h (103 mph) blows through the cave's narrow opening due to the chimney effect.

Since its discovery, surveyors have considered the cave extremely difficult to explore, owing to the numerous waterfalls, flooded passages, and traverses within. As a result, it is not included on the list of Turkish caves open to the public. Access is only permitted to approved professionals with appropriate caving gear.

== Exploration ==
The cave was first discovered in 1964 by the Turkish "father of caves", Temuçin Aygen. His brief foray into the cave with the Speleological Society of Turkey was halted by a sump, or flooded passage, just inside the entrance. A team of French speleologists of the Spéléo-club de Paris working with local Turkish cavers was the first to enter the cave proper. Team members J. L. Pintaux and Doniat (full names not given) passed through the sump in August 1965 and were the first to explore the cave's interior. In August 1968, Claude Chabert, and Michel Bakalowicz of the Spéléo-club de Paris, accompanied by Michael Clarke of the British Speleological Association, were the second group to venture past the entry sump. They explored the interior further, documenting the first waterfall inside the cave, before handing off to an English team from the Chelsea Speleological Society which explored approximately 900 m (3,000 ft) of galleries until forced to stop by another flooded passage at 80 m (260 ft) above the entrance. The English team returned in August 1969 and pushed forward to about 1,600 m (5,200 ft) before stopping. Their exploration brought them to 138 m (453 ft) above the entrance.

In August 1970, the French Alpine Club, along with Clarke, managed to follow the subterranean river 3,220 m (10,560 ft) into the cave, reaching 190 m (620 ft) above the entrance, where they were stopped by a waterfall. Clarke returned with the French Alpine Club again in August 1971, this time joined by members of the Speleological Society of Turkey. This group followed the river through fossil-bearing galleries before stopping at a 15-metre-deep (49 ft) well, at a depth of 248 m (814 ft). By this point 4,685 m (15,371 ft) of passages had been documented within Pınargözü Cave. In September 1975, the Red Rose Cave & Pothole Club discovered and explored a tributary passage which they called the Affluent sump. A five-person team from the University of Bristol Speleological Society entered the cave immediately following the departure of the Red Rose team. This team free-dove the 7 m (23 ft) sump at the end of the cave, but were unable to progress past an 18 m (59 ft) waterfall.

By the mid-1970s, the cave had been documented as being 248 m (814 ft) above the entrance and approximately 5,275 m (17,306 ft) long. Over 100 individual caves had been mapped within it. In August of 1987, 1988, and 1989, a team from the French Federation of Speleology attempted to press further into the cave. On their final trip in 1989, they managed to climb the waterfall that had stymied the University of Bristol Team, ultimately reaching a height of −661.5 m (−2,170 ft) above the entrance. During these expeditions, a total of 4 km (2.5 mi) of new passages were explored, and 2.4 km (1.5 mi) of new galleries were surveyed.

By 1992, it was asserted that the cave was up to 12 km (7 mi) long. In 2011, a French team claimed to have surveyed the cave to a length of more than 16 km (10 mi).

In 2011, the Turkish government launched a project entitled "Kızıldağ Milli Parkı Mağaralarının Araştırılması Projesi" (English: Investigation of Caves of Kızıldağ National Park), the purpose of which was to catalogue and investigate the caves within the park, particularly Pınargözü Cave. Initially, the project was intended to last until 2014, but due to the extreme difficulty of exploring the cave, the 12-member team was still surveying in 2015. In August 2015, project manager Selim Erdogan stated that the French team's estimate of 16 km (10 mi) was unproven. His team had pushed as far as 10.5 km (6.5 mi) into the cave. The full extent of Pınargözü Cave has still not been surveyed.

== Geology ==
Pınargözü Cave is located within a karst region of the western Taurus Mountains, which encompasses nearly 40,000 km^{2} (15,000 sq mi). The karst in that region is Triassic period limestone. Because of limestone's extreme porosity, it is highly susceptible to erosion; karst areas typically have large numbers of caves and chambers, and the Pınargözü Cave is no exception. Estimates for the number of caves in the area vary widely. The Turkey Archaeological Settlements Project (TAY) estimates just over 2,400 caves in the area, while the Turkish Ministry of Culture and Tourism claims there may be over 20,000. Pınargözü Cave is largely laid out horizontally, with numerous vertical chimneys and cascades between horizontal galleries and passages. In total, the cave rises to a height of approximately 720 m (2,360 ft) above its .5-metre-wide (1 ft 8 in) entrance, located 1,550 m (5,090 ft) high on the slopes of Mount Dedegöl.

=== Hydrology ===
Pınargözü Cave is an active cave, meaning that water flows within it. It is considered an outflow cave, as the water flows out of the cave's mouth from a spring inside. The source of the spring has yet to be located, although there are semi-permanent fields of snow and a large tarn, or glacial lake, on the ground above the cave.

The cave contains a number of water features which make it extremely difficult to explore, such as large waterfalls, ponds, dripstone pools, sumps, and siphons. The flow rate fluctuates with the season, from over 700 litres per second during most of the year to approximately 500–600 litres per second during the slower-flowing summer season. Because of this, summer is the only time when it is possible to explore the cave. The water temperature is around 4–5 °C (39–41 °F) year-round, which means that divers must wear thick protective clothing when exploring flooded areas of the cave. The air temperature in the majority of the cave system is 5 °C (41 °F).

=== Wind ===
The wind that emanates from the mouth of the cave has been measured anywhere from 100 kilometres per hour (62 mph) to upwards of 160 km/h (99 mph). For comparison, the Beaufort wind force scale classifies any wind greater than 89 km/h as a whole gale, and anything greater than 118 km/h as a hurricane-force wind. This wind is created as a result of the chimney effect, where temperature differences between openings in higher and lower altitudes result in strong gusts of wind coming from the lower entrance.
