= Yaka, Gelendost =

Yaka
- Village
- Location within Turkey
- Coordinates: 38°02′N 31°02′E
- Country: Turkey
- Province: Isparta
- District: Gelendost
- Elevation: 1,040 m (3,410 ft)
- Population (2022): 1,552
- Time zone: UTC+3 (TRT)
- Postal code: 32900
- Area code: 0246

Yaka is a village in Gelendost District, Isparta Province, Turkey. Its population is 1,552 (2022). Before the 2013 reorganisation, it was a town (belde).

== Geography ==
Yaka is situated to the east of Lake Eğirdir and to the south of Gelendost. Distance to Gelendost is 3 kilometres (1.9 mi) and to Isparta is 80 kilometres (50 mi).

== History ==
The area around Yaka was probably populated during the Neolithic Age and there is a rock carved figure of a female to the east of the town which is thought to be of Cybele, the mother goddess of ancient Anatolia. The present town was founded by Turks around the 15th century. The name of the town suggests that these people may be of Yaka tribe from Mangyshlak Peninsula at the east coast of Caspian Sea, now in Kazakhstan. (There are many other settlements in Turkey with the same name) But the population of the settlement also included Greeks up to 20th century before population exchange agreement between Greece and Turkey. In 1975 the settlement was declared a seat of township.

== Economy ==
Cattle rising and apple production constitute the main revenues of the town. There are also some small scale workshops. Another source of revenue is the former town residents who now are working in Germany as gastarbeiter.
