= Agrae (Pisidia) =

Ancient city of Pisidia

Coordinates: 37°57′05″N 30°38′34″E

Agrae or Agrai (Ancient Greek: Ἀγραῖ) was an inland town of ancient Pisidia inhabited during Byzantine times.

Its site is located near Ağras, in Atabey, Isparta Province, Turkey.
