= Adrianopolis (disambiguation) =

Adrianopolis may refer to:

- Adrianopolis, an old name for the city of Edirne, Turkey
- Adrianópolis, a municipality in the state of Paraná in the Southern Region of Brazil
- Adrianópolis (Manaus), a neighborhood in Manaus, Amazonas, Brazil.

== See also ==
- Hadrianopolis (disambiguation)
