= Hadriani =

Hadriani may refer to:

- Hadriani ad Olympum, ancient town and bishopric of Bithynia
- Hadriani, historic name of Hadrianopolis (Pisidia)
