= Yukarıkaşıkara, Yalvaç =

Yukarıkaşıkara
- Village
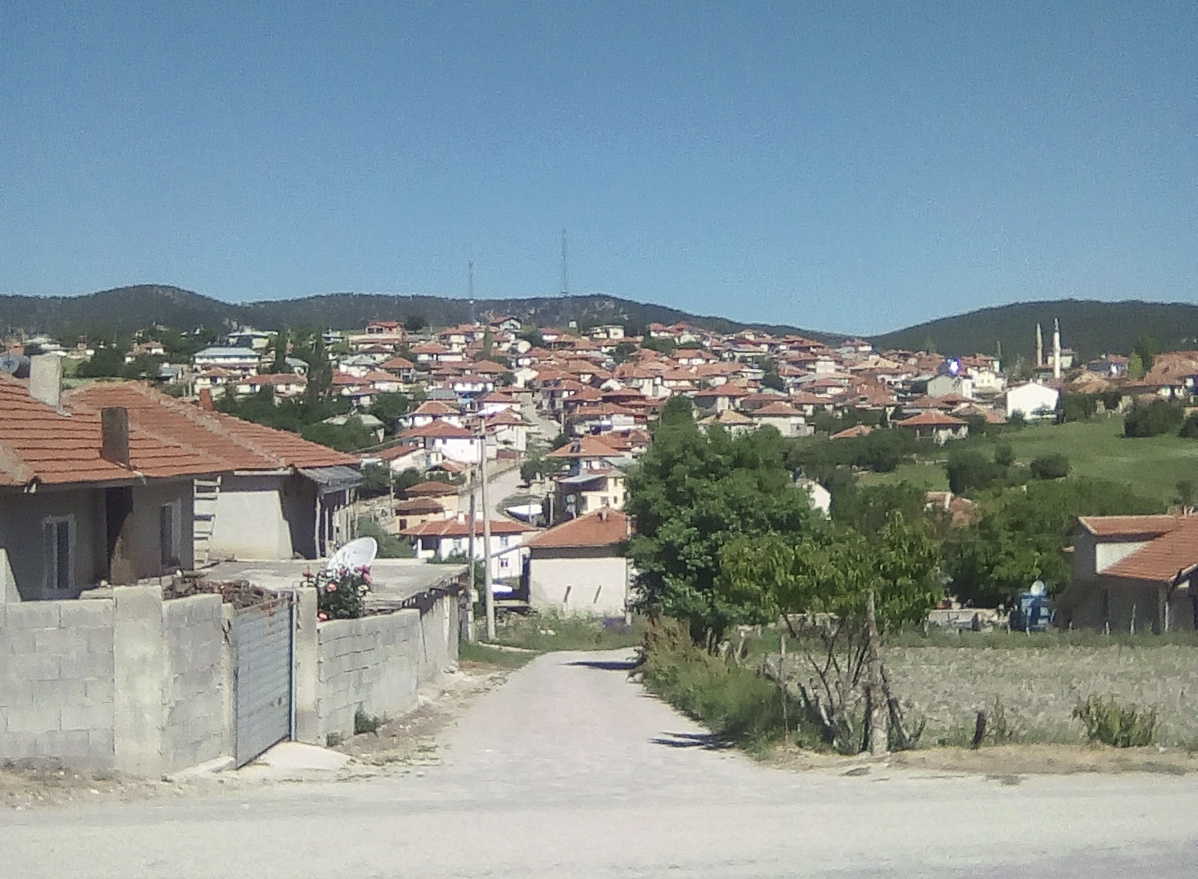
- A view of the village.

- Location within Turkey
- Coordinates: 38°20′44″N 30°52′01″E
- Country: Turkey
- Province: Isparta
- District: Yalvaç
- Elevation: 1,276 m (4,186 ft)
- Population (2022): 1,116
- Time zone: UTC+3 (TRT)
- Postal code: 32400
- Area code: 0246

Yukarıkaşıkara, also known as Yukarı Kaşıkara, is a village in the Yalvaç District, Isparta Province, Turkey. Its population is 1,116 (2022). Before the 2013 reorganisation, it was a town (belde).

== History ==
The village has had the same name since 1928. It became a municipality on December 17, 1986. However, the municipality status of the town ended in 2013 due to the population dropping below 2,000.

== Geography ==
The village is located 100 km away from the center of Isparta and 38 km away from the center of Yalvaç.

== Demographics ==
Historical population
Year	Pop.	±% p.a.
1990	2,244	—
1997	2,432	+1.16%
2007	1,805	−2.94%
2012	1,900	+1.03%
2017	1,218	−8.51%
2022	1,116	−1.73%
Source: 1990 census, 1997 census and TÜIK (2007-2022)

== Gallery ==
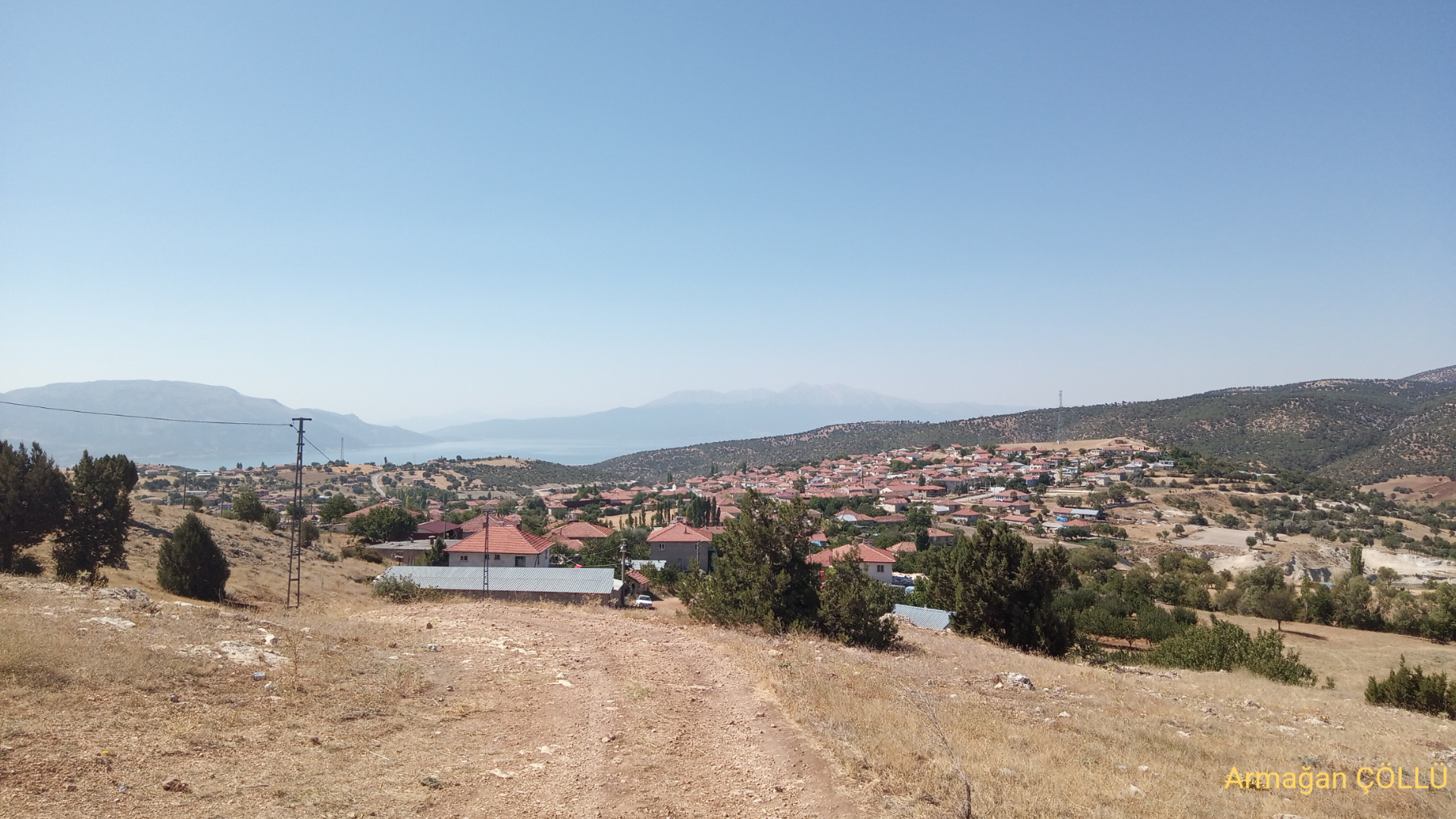
A panoramic view of the village.
