= Senirkent District =

District of Isparta Province, Turkey

- District
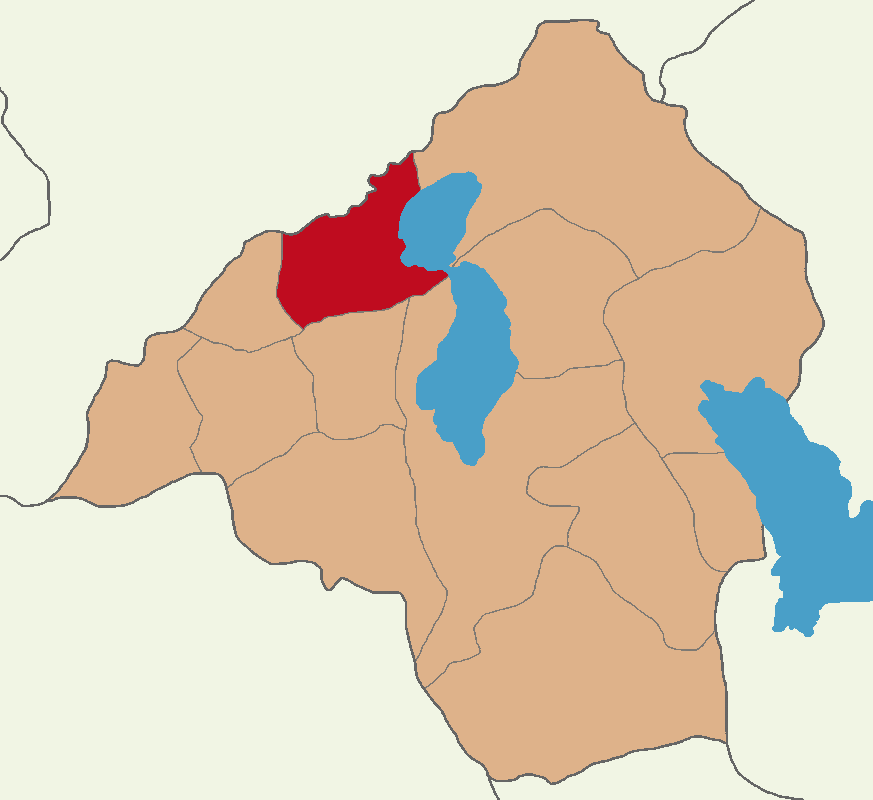
- Map showing Senirkent District in Isparta Province

- Location in Turkey
- Coordinates: 38°06′N 30°33′E
- Country: Turkey
- Province: Isparta
- Seat: Senirkent

Government
  - Kaymakam: Abdüllatif Yılmaz
- Area: 521 km^{2} (201 sq mi)
- Population (2022): 10,720
  - Density: 20.6/km^{2} (53.3/sq mi)
- Time zone: UTC+3 (TRT)
- Website: www.senirkent.gov.tr

Senirkent District is a district of the Isparta Province of Turkey. Its seat is the town of Senirkent. Its area is 521 km^{2}, and its population is 10,720 (2022).

== Composition ==
There are two municipalities in Senirkent District:

- Büyükkabaca
- Senirkent

There are 7 villages in Senirkent District:

- Akkeçili
- Başköy
- Garipköy
- Gençali
- Ortayazı
- Uluğbey
- Yassıören
