= Sütçüler District =

District of Isparta Province, Turkey

- District
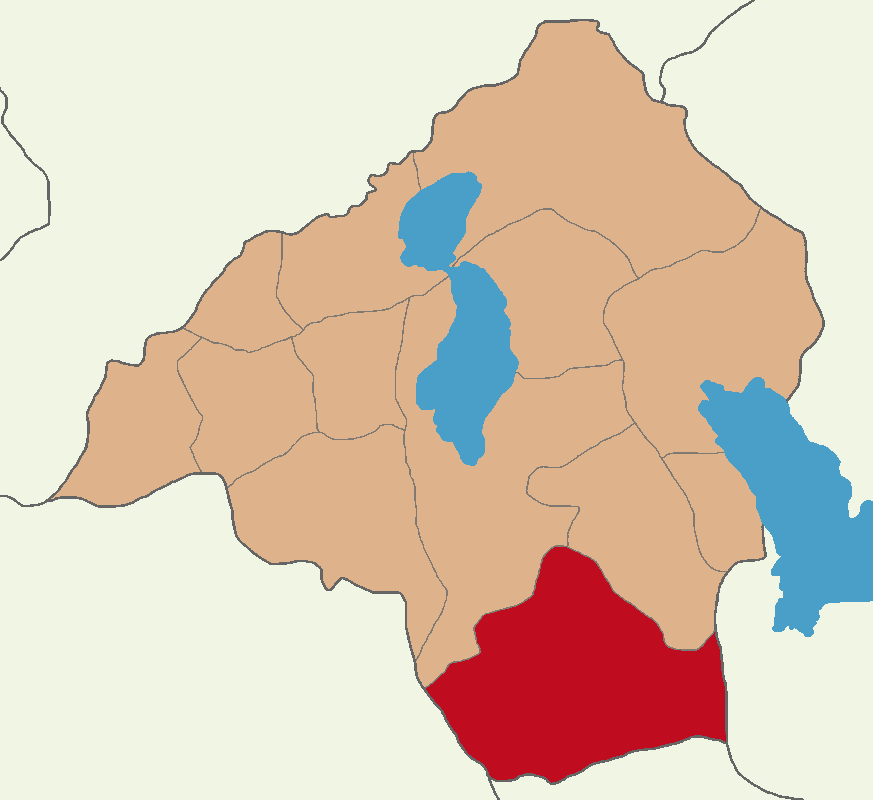
- Map showing Sütçüler District in Isparta Province

- Location in Turkey
- Coordinates: 37°30′N 30°59′E
- Country: Turkey
- Province: Isparta
- Seat: Sütçüler

Government
  - Kaymakam: Kerem Yüce
- Area: 1,235 km^{2} (477 sq mi)
- Population (2022): 9,869
  - Density: 8.0/km^{2} (21/sq mi)
- Time zone: UTC+3 (TRT)
- Website: www.sutculer.gov.tr

Sütçüler District is a district of the Isparta Province of Turkey. Its seat is the town of Sütçüler. Its area is 1,235 km^{2}, and its population is 9,869 (2022).

== Composition ==
There is one municipality in Sütçüler District:

- Sütçüler

There are 30 villages in Sütçüler District:

- Aşağıyaylabel
- Ayvalıpınar
- Bekirağalar
- Belence
- Beydili
- Boğazköy
- Bucakdere
- Çandır
- Çobanisa
- Çukurca
- Darıbükü
- Güldallı
- Gümü
- Hacıahmetler
- Hacıaliler
- İbişler
- İncedere
- Karadiken
- Kasımlar
- Kesme
- Kuzca
- Melikler
- Müezzinler
- Pınarköy
- Sağrak
- Sarayköy
- Sarımehmetler
- Şeyhler
- Yeniköy
- Yeşilyurt
