= Büyükkabaca =

- Municipality
- Location in Turkey
- Coordinates: 38°10′N 30°39′E
- Country: Turkey
- Province: Isparta
- District: Senirkent
- Population (2022): 3,546
- Time zone: UTC+3 (TRT)

Büyükkabaca is a town (belde) in the Senirkent District, Isparta Province, Turkey. Its population is 3,546 (2022). It is 14 km distant from the centre of Senirkent and 10 km distant to Lake Eğirdir.
