= Uluborlu District =

District of Isparta Province, Turkey

- District
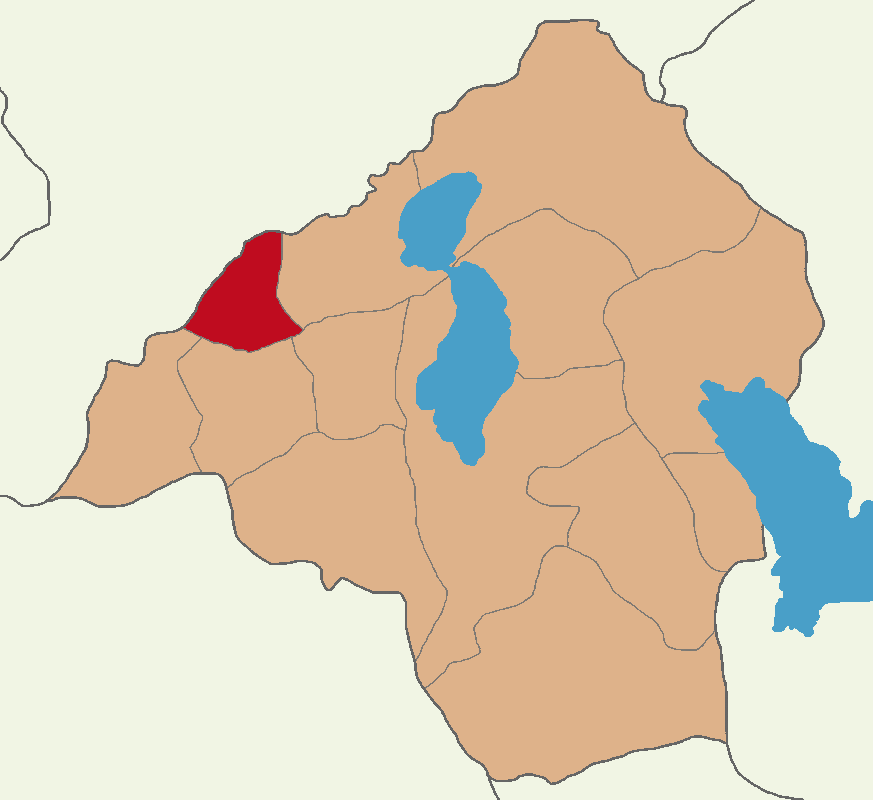
- Map showing Uluborlu District in Isparta Province

- Location in Turkey
- Coordinates: 38°05′N 30°27′E
- Country: Turkey
- Province: Isparta
- Seat: Uluborlu

Government
  - Kaymakam: Ali Kantilav
- Area: 240 km^{2} (90 sq mi)
- Population (2022): 6,554
  - Density: 27/km^{2} (71/sq mi)
- Time zone: UTC+3 (TRT)
- Website: www.uluborlu.gov.tr

Uluborlu District is a district of the Isparta Province of Turkey. Its seat is the town of Uluborlu. Its area is 240 km^{2}, and its population is 6,554 (2022).

== Composition ==
There is one municipality in Uluborlu District:

- Uluborlu

There are 4 villages in Uluborlu District:

- Dere
- İleydağı
- İnhisar
- Küçükkabaca
