= Aksu District, Isparta =

District of Isparta Province, Turkey

Aksu District
- District
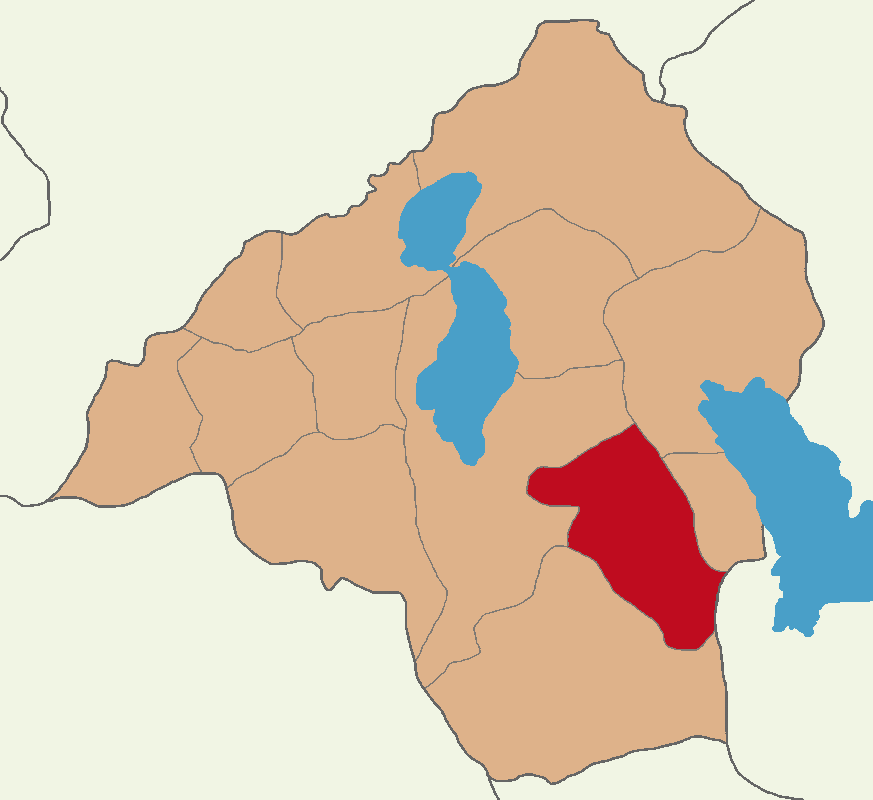
- Map showing Aksu District in Isparta Province

- Location within Turkey
- Coordinates: 37°48′N 31°04′E
- Country: Turkey
- Province: Isparta
- Seat: Aksu

Government
  - Kaymakam: Mehmet Tığlı
- Area: 544 km^{2} (210 sq mi)
- Population (2022): 4,131
  - Density: 7.59/km^{2} (19.7/sq mi)
- Time zone: UTC+3 (TRT)
- Website: www.aksu.gov.tr

Aksu District is a district of the Isparta Province of Turkey. Its seat is the town of Aksu. Its area is 544 km^{2}, and its population is 4,131 (2022).

== Composition ==
There is one municipality in Aksu District:

- Aksu

There are 13 villages in Aksu District:

- Eldere
- Elecik
- Karacahisar
- Karağı
- Katipköy
- Koçular
- Kösre
- Sofular
- Terziler
- Yakaafşar
- Yakaköy
- Yılanlı
- Yukarı Yaylabel
