= Atabey District =

District of Isparta Province, Turkey

- District
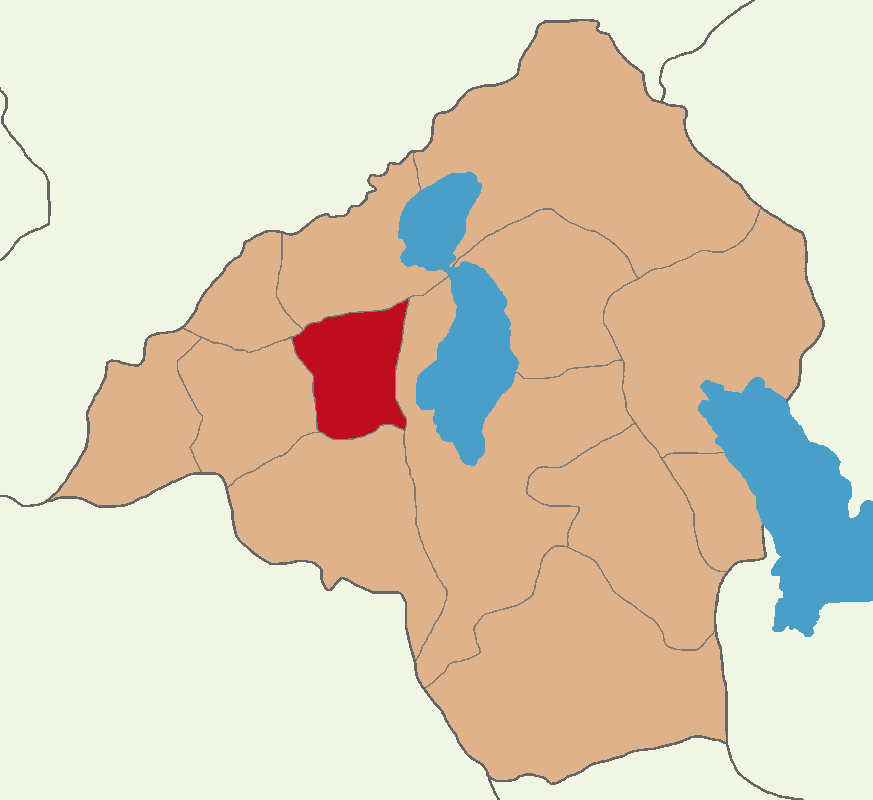
- Map showing Atabey District in Isparta Province

- Location in Turkey
- Coordinates: 37°57′N 30°38′E
- Country: Turkey
- Province: Isparta
- Seat: Atabey

Government
  - Kaymakam: Yunus Emre Akpınar
- Area: 223 km^{2} (86 sq mi)
- Population (2022): 5,970
  - Density: 27/km^{2} (69/sq mi)
- Time zone: UTC+3 (TRT)
- Website: www.atabey.gov.tr

Atabey District is a district of the Isparta Province of Turkey. Its seat is the town of Atabey. Its area is 223 km^{2}, and its population is 5,970 (2022).

== Composition ==
There is one municipality in Atabey District:

- Atabey

There are 5 villages in Atabey District:

- Bayat
- Harmanören
- İslamköy
- Kapıcak
- Pembeli
