= Yalvaç District =

District of Isparta Province, Turkey

- District
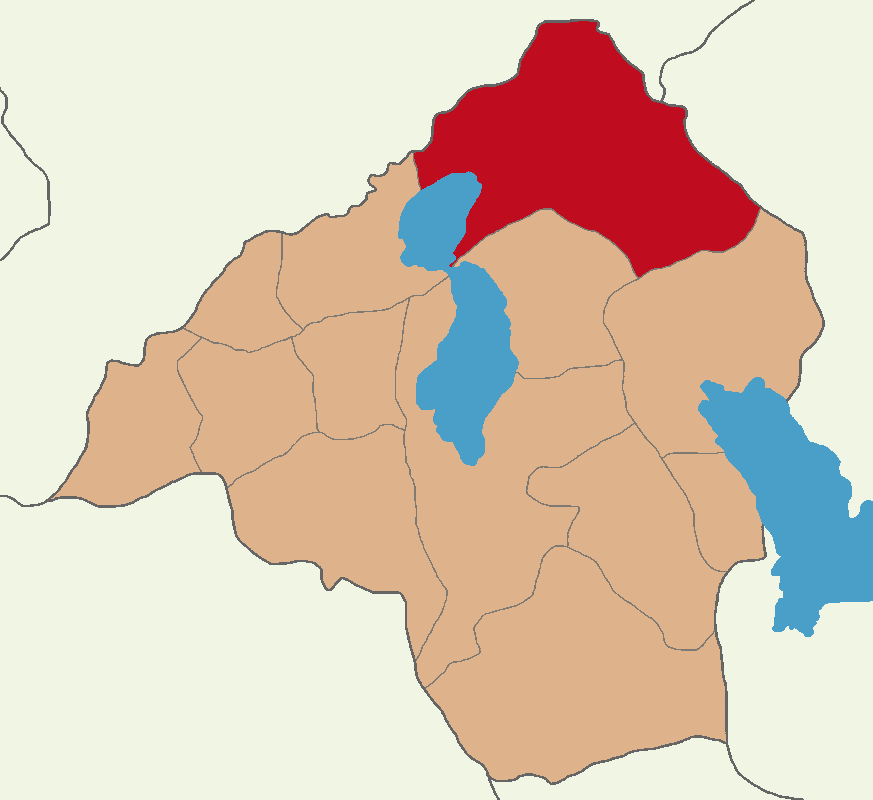
- Map showing Yalvaç District in Isparta Province

- Location in Turkey
- Coordinates: 38°18′N 31°11′E
- Country: Turkey
- Province: Isparta
- Seat: Yalvaç

Government
  - Kaymakam: Abdüllatif Yılmaz
- Area: 1,402 km^{2} (541 sq mi)
- Population (2022): 45,931
  - Density: 33/km^{2} (85/sq mi)
- Time zone: UTC+3 (TRT)
- Website: www.yalvac.gov.tr

Yalvaç District is a district of the Isparta Province of Turkey. Its seat is the town of Yalvaç. Its area is 1,402 km^{2}, and its population is 45,931 (2022).

== Composition ==
There are two municipalities in Yalvaç District:

- Hüyüklü
- Yalvaç

There are 37 villages in Yalvaç District:

- Akçaşar
- Altıkapı
- Aşağı Kaşıkara
- Aşağıtırtar
- Ayvalı
- Bağkonak
- Bağlarbaşı
- Bahtiyar
- Çakırçal
- Çamharman
- Celeptaş
- Çetince
- Dedeçam
- Eğirler
- Eyüpler
- Gökçeali
- Hisarardı
- İleği
- Kırkbaş
- Körküler
- Koruyaka
- Kozluçay
- Kumdanlı
- Kurusarı
- Kuyucak
- Mısırlı
- Özbayat
- Özgüney
- Sağırköy
- Sücüllü
- Taşevi
- Terziler
- Tokmacık
- Yağcılar
- Yarıkkaya
- Yukarıkaşıkara
- Yukarıtırtar
