= Eğirdir District =

District of Isparta Province, Turkey

- District
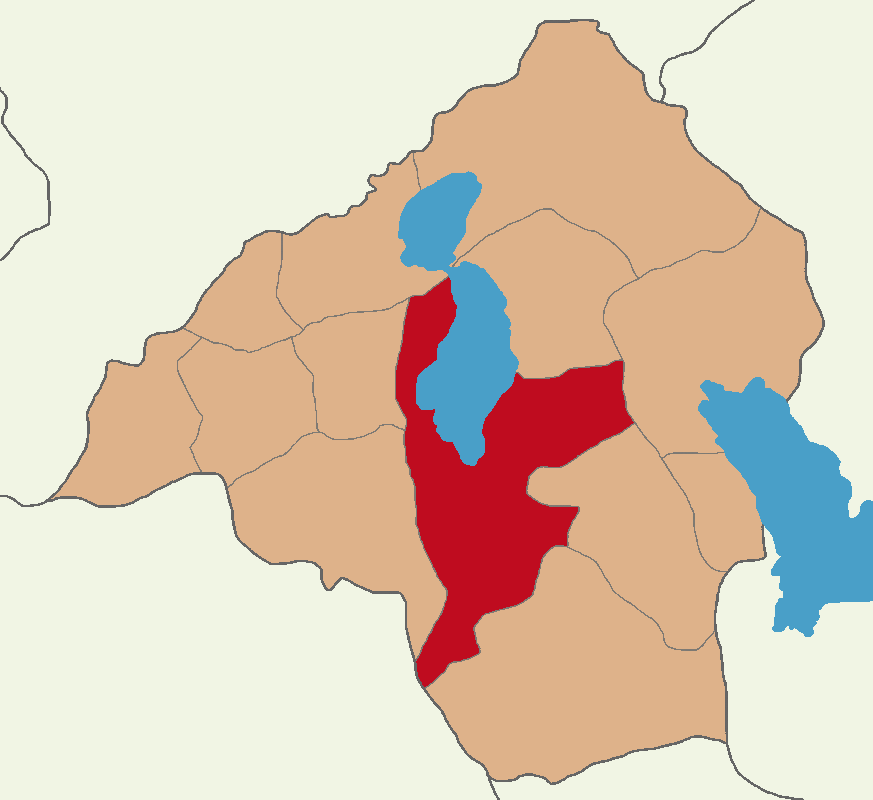
- Map showing Eğirdir District in Isparta Province

- Location in Turkey
- Coordinates: 37°52′N 30°51′E
- Country: Turkey
- Province: Isparta
- Seat: Eğirdir

Government
  - Kaymakam: Adem Çelik
- Area: 1,315 km^{2} (508 sq mi)
- Population (2022): 30,854
  - Density: 23/km^{2} (61/sq mi)
- Time zone: UTC+3 (TRT)
- Website: www.egirdir.gov.tr

Eğirdir District is a district of the Isparta Province of Turkey. Its seat is the town of Eğirdir. Its area is 1,315 km^{2}, and its population is 30,854 (2022).

== Composition ==
There are two municipalities in Eğirdir District:

- Eğirdir
- Sarıidris

There are 29 villages in Eğirdir District:

- Ağılköy
- Akdoğan
- Akpınar
- Aşağı Gökdere
- Bademli
- Bağcık
- Bağıllı
- Bağören
- Baklan
- Balkırı
- Barla
- Beydere
- Çayköy
- Eyüpler
- Gökçehüyük
- Göktaş
- Havutlu
- Haymana
- Kırıntı
- Mahmatlar
- Pazarköy
- Serpilköy
- Sevinçbey
- Sipahiler
- Sorkuncak
- Tepeli
- Yılgıncak
- Yukarıgökdere
- Yuvalı
