= Gönen District, Isparta =

District of Isparta Province, Turkey

Gönen District
- District
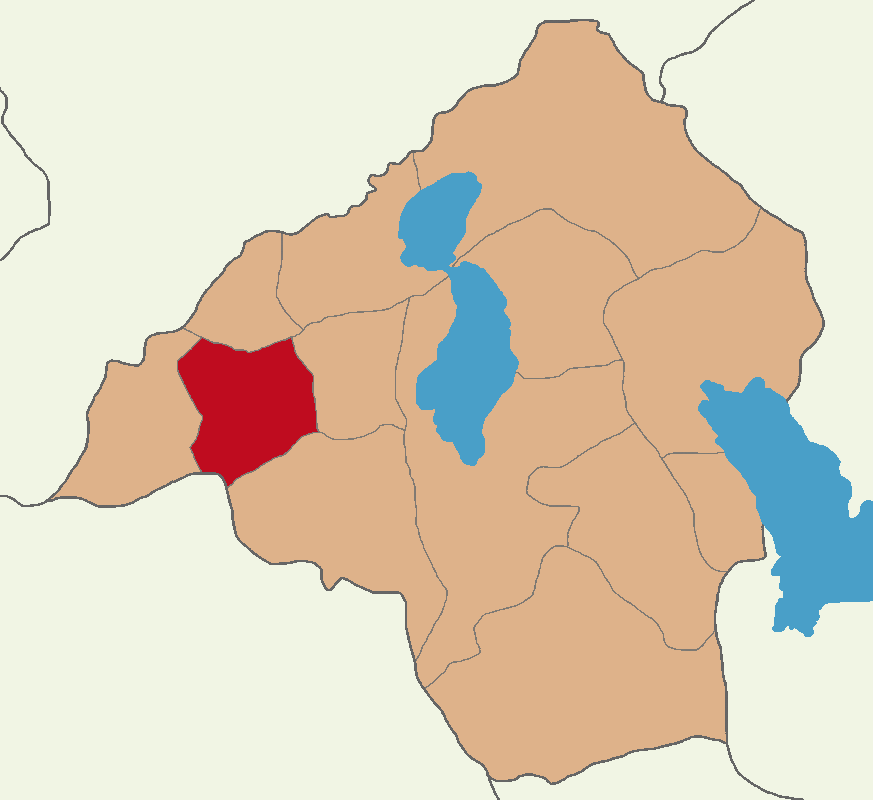
- Map showing Gönen District in Isparta Province

- Location in Turkey
- Coordinates: 37°57′N 30°31′E
- Country: Turkey
- Province: Isparta
- Seat: Gönen

Government
  - Kaymakam: Ali Argama
- Area: 285 km^{2} (110 sq mi)
- Population (2022): 6,883
  - Density: 24/km^{2} (63/sq mi)
- Time zone: UTC+3 (TRT)
- Website: www.ispartagonen.gov.tr

Gönen District is a district of the Isparta Province of Turkey. Its seat is the town of Gönen. Its area is 285 km^{2}, and its population is 6,883 (2022).

== Composition ==
There are two municipalities in Gönen District:

- Gönen
- Güneykent

There are 5 villages in Gönen District:

- Gölbaşı
- Iğdecik
- Kızılcık
- Koçtepe
- Senirce
