= Yazılı Canyon Nature Park =

Canyon in Isparta, Turkey

- Yazılı Kanyon Tabiat Parkı
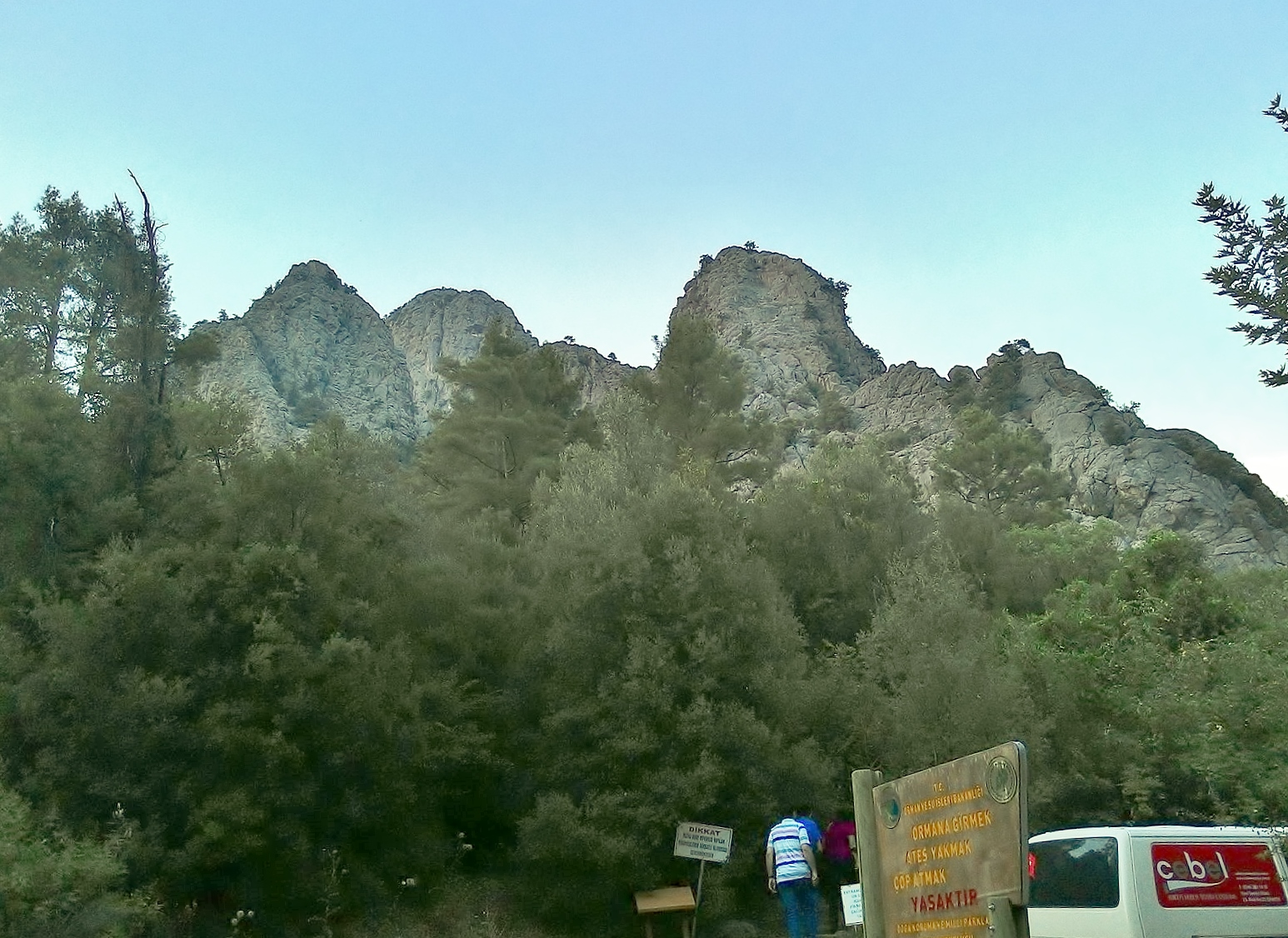
- A view from Yazılı Canyon, Tırkey.

- Location within Turkey
- Location: Sütçüler, Isparta Province, Turkey
- Coordinates: 37°28′07″N 30°55′21″E
- Area: 546 ha (1,350 acres)
- Established: September 5, 1989; 36 years ago
- Visitors: nearly 70,000 (in 2015)
- Governing body: Directorate-General of Nature Protection and National Parks; Ministry of Environment and Forest

Yazılı Canyon Nature Park (Turkish: Yazılı Kanyon Tabiat Parkı) is a canyon in Isparta Province, southwestern Turkey, which was declared with its surrounding area a nature park in 1989.

The canyon is located near Çandır village in Sütçüler district of Isparta Province, southwestern Turkey. It is about 80 km (50 mi) south of Isparta. The canyon takes its name "Yazılı" (literally "Written" from an ancient text carved on a rock inside the canyon, which has archaeological importance.

The area around the canyon covering 546 ha (1,350 acres) was declared as the country's second nature park by the Ministry of Environment and Forest on September 5, 1989.

As reported in 2015, nearly 70,000 domestic and foreign tourists visit the nature park annually. The nature park can be visited on a day-only base since there is no lodging facility.
