= Gelendost District =

District of Isparta Province, Turkey

- District
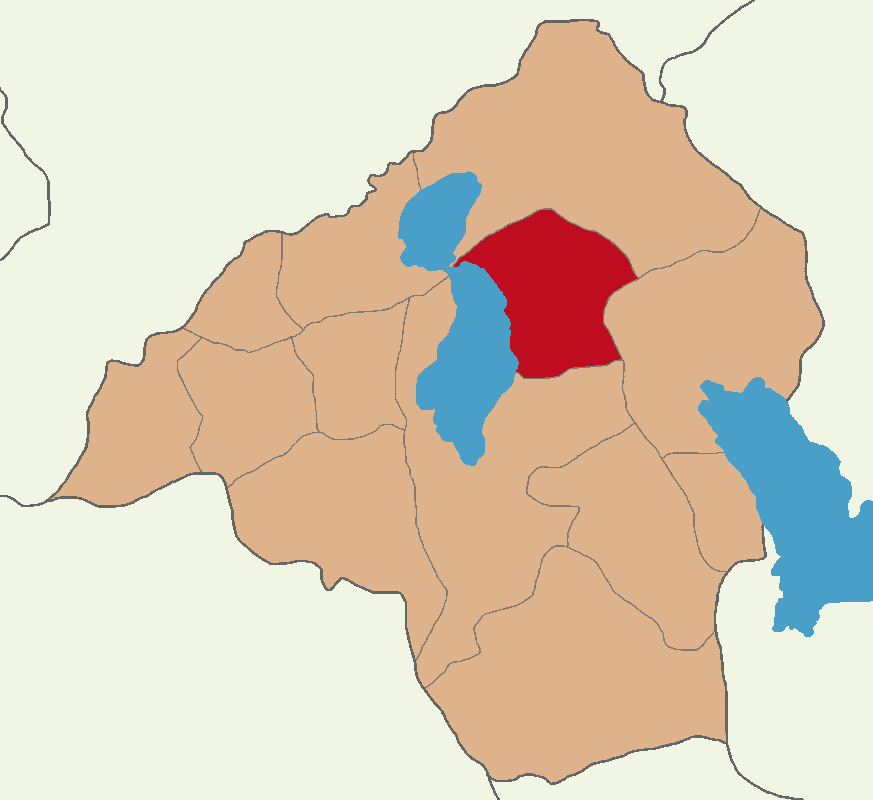
- Map showing Gelendost District in Isparta Province

- Location in Turkey
- Coordinates: 38°07′N 31°01′E
- Country: Turkey
- Province: Isparta
- Seat: Gelendost

Government
  - Kaymakam: Abdüllatif Yılmaz
- Area: 610 km^{2} (240 sq mi)
- Population (2022): 14,678
  - Density: 24/km^{2} (62/sq mi)
- Time zone: UTC+3 (TRT)
- Website: www.gelendost.gov.tr

Gelendost District is a district of the Isparta Province of Turkey. Its seat is the town of Gelendost. Its area is 610 km^{2}, and its population is 14,678 (2022).

== Composition ==
There is one municipality in Gelendost District:

- Gelendost

There are 13 villages in Gelendost District:

- Afşar
- Akdağ
- Bağıllı
- Balcı
- Çaltı
- Esinyurt
- Hacılar
- Keçili
- Köke
- Madenli
- Yaka
- Yenice
- Yeşilköy
