= Şarkikaraağaç District =

District of Isparta Province, Turkey

- District
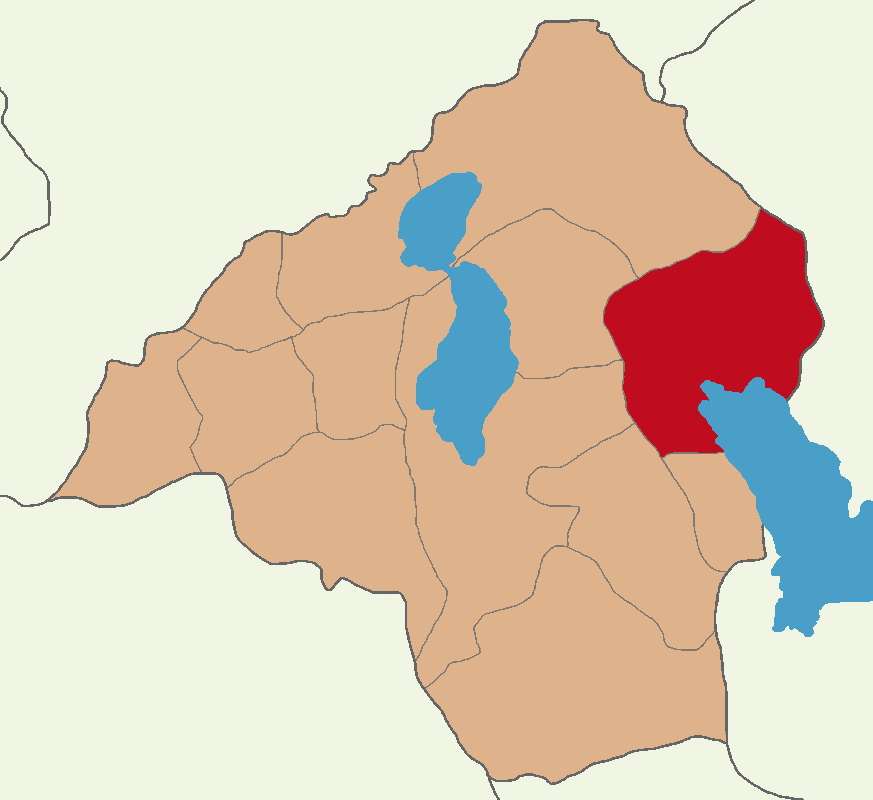
- Map showing Şarkikaraağaç District in Isparta Province

- Location in Turkey
- Coordinates: 38°05′N 31°22′E
- Country: Turkey
- Province: Isparta
- Seat: Şarkikaraağaç

Government
  - Kaymakam: Talha Atılay Teymur
- Area: 1,068 km^{2} (412 sq mi)
- Population (2022): 24,660
  - Density: 23/km^{2} (60/sq mi)
- Time zone: UTC+3 (TRT)
- Website: www.sarkikaraagac.gov.tr

Şarkikaraağaç District is a district of the Isparta Province of Turkey. Its seat is the town of Şarkikaraağaç. Its area is 1,068 km^{2}, and its population is 24,660 (2022).

== Composition ==
There are three municipalities in Şarkikaraağaç District:

- Çarıksaraylar
- Çiçekpınar
- Şarkikaraağaç

There are 26 villages in Şarkikaraağaç District:

- Arak
- Armutlu
- Arslandoğmuş
- Aşağıdinek
- Başdeğirmen
- Belceğiz
- Beyköy
- Çaltı
- Çavundur
- Çeltek
- Fakılar
- Gedikli
- Göksöğüt
- Karayaka
- Kıyakdede
- Köprüköy
- Muratbağı
- Ördekçi
- Örenköy
- Salur
- Sarıkaya
- Yakaemir
- Yassıbel
- Yenicekale
- Yeniköy
- Yukarıdinek
