= Keçiborlu District =

District of Isparta Province, Turkey

- District
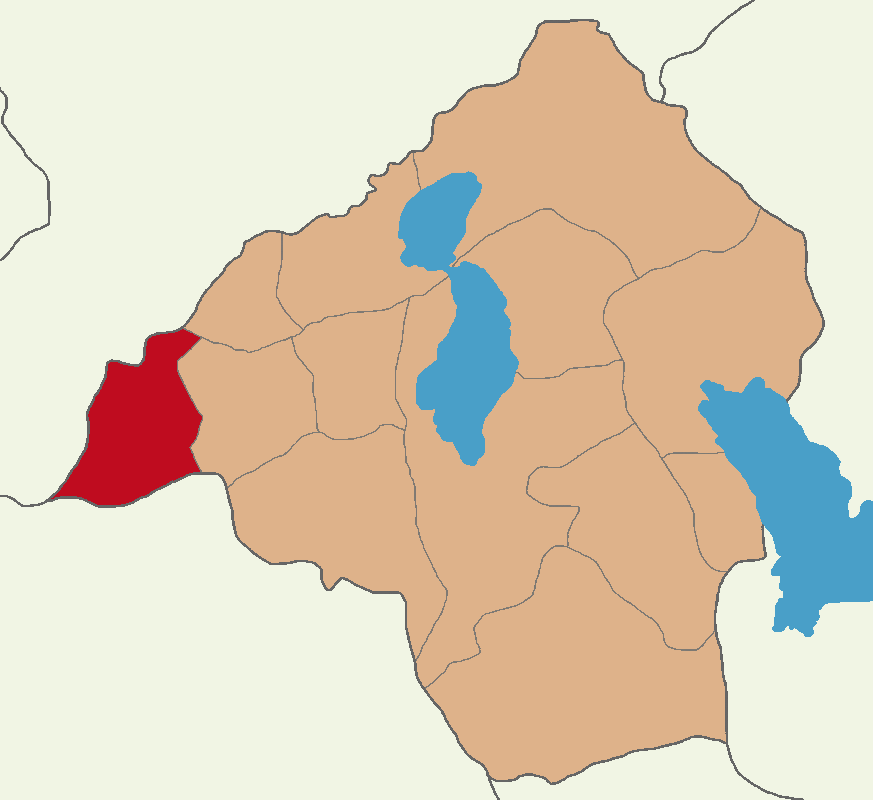
- Map showing Keçiborlu District in Isparta Province

- Location in Turkey
- Coordinates: 37°57′N 30°18′E
- Country: Turkey
- Province: Isparta
- Seat: Keçiborlu

Government
  - Kaymakam: Tahsin Aksu
- Area: 494 km^{2} (191 sq mi)
- Population (2022): 13,830
  - Density: 28/km^{2} (73/sq mi)
- Time zone: UTC+3 (TRT)
- Website: www.keciborlu.gov.tr

Keçiborlu District is a district of the Isparta Province of Turkey. Its seat is the town of Keçiborlu. Its area is 494 km^{2}, and its population is 13,830 (2022).

== Composition ==
There are two municipalities in Keçiborlu District:

- Keçiborlu
- Senir

There are 14 villages in Keçiborlu District:

- Ardıçlı
- Aydoğmuş
- Çukurören
- Gülköy
- İncesu
- Kaplanlı
- Kavak
- Kılıç
- Kozluca
- Kuyucak
- Özbahçe
- Saracık
- Yenitepe
- Yeşilyurt
