= Yenişarbademli District =

District of Isparta Province, Turkey

- District
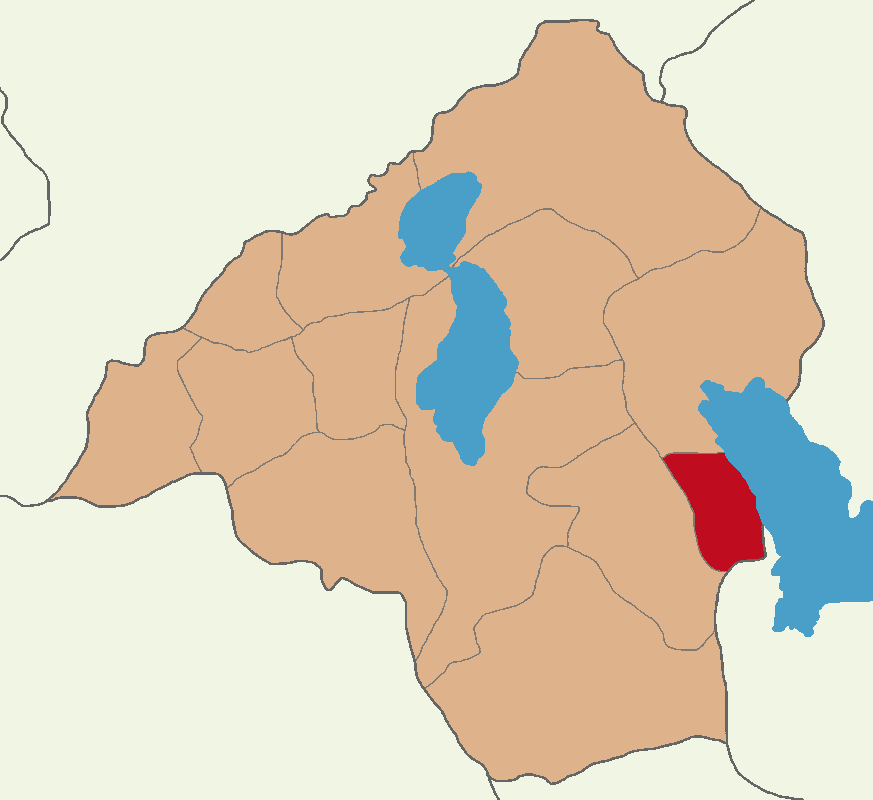
- Map showing Yenişarbademli District in Isparta Province

- Location in Turkey
- Coordinates: 37°42′N 31°23′E
- Country: Turkey
- Province: Isparta
- Seat: Yenişarbademli

Government
  - Kaymakam: Ömer Karadağ
- Area: 237 km^{2} (92 sq mi)
- Population (2022): 2,650
  - Density: 11/km^{2} (29/sq mi)
- Time zone: UTC+3 (TRT)
- Website: www.yenisarbademli.gov.tr

Yenişarbademli District is a district of the Isparta Province of Turkey. Its seat is the town of Yenişarbademli. Its area is 237 km^{2}, and its population is 2,650 (2022).

== Composition ==
There is one municipality in Yenişarbademli District:

- Yenişarbademli

There is one village in Yenişarbademli District:

- Gölkonak
