= Hadrianopolis (Macedonia) =

Coordinates: 41°08′11″N 24°16′00″E

Hadrianopolis (Ancient Greek: Ἁδριανούπολις) was a town of ancient Macedonia.

Its site is located near Adriani, Paranesti in Greece.
