= Gönen, Isparta =

Gönen
- Municipality
- Location in Turkey
- Coordinates: 37°57′23″N 30°30′46″E
- Country: Turkey
- Province: Isparta
- District: Gönen

Government
  - Mayor: Osman Kesmen (CHP)
- Elevation: 1,050 m (3,440 ft)
- Population (2022): 3,177
- Time zone: UTC+3 (TRT)
- Postal code: 32090
- Area code: 0246
- Website: gönen.bel.tr

Gönen is a town in Isparta Province in the Mediterranean Region of Turkey. It is the seat of Gönen District. Its population is 3,177 (2022). The mayor is Osman Kesmen, who was elected in 2019. The cement plant is a major source of greenhouse gas.
