= Hüyüklü, Yalvaç =

Hüyüklü
- Municipality
- Location in Turkey
- Coordinates: 38°14′14″N 31°7′29″E
- Country: Turkey
- Province: Isparta
- District: Yalvaç
- Population (2022): 1,654
- Time zone: UTC+3 (TRT)

Hüyüklü is a town (belde) in the Yalvaç District, Isparta Province, Turkey. Its population is 1,654 (2022).
