= Sadağı Canyon Nature Park =

Nature park declared canyon in Bursa, Turkey

- Sadağı Kanyonu Tabiat Parkı
- Location within Turkey
- Location: Orhaneli, Bursa Province, Turkey
- Nearest city: Orhaneli
- Coordinates: 39°52′13″N 28°54′26″E
- Established: 2013; 13 years ago
- Governing body: Directorate-General of Nature Protection and National Parks; Ministry of Environment and Forest

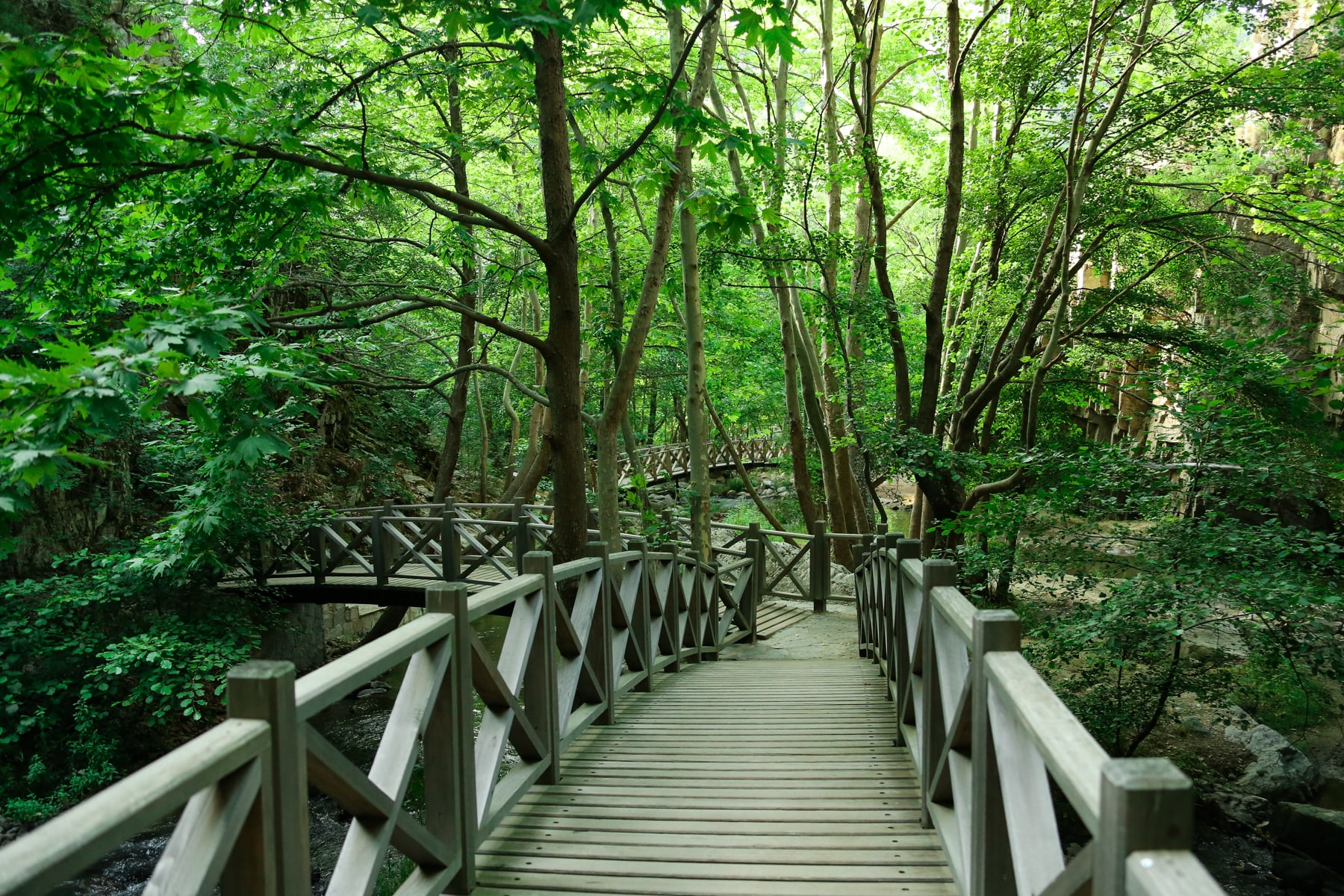
A bridge in Sadağı Canyon

Sadağı Canyon Nature Park (Turkish: Sadağı Kanyonu Tabiat Parkı) is a nature park declared canyon in Bursa, Turkey.

The canyon is located at Sadağı village of Orhaneli district in Bursa Province. It is at 55 km (34 mi) southwest of Bursa. The canyon is 12 km (7.5 mi) long, and has depictions of human and animal on the canyon walls. The canyon covers an area of 4,360 daa (4.36 km^{2}; 1.68 sq mi).

In 2013, the canyon area was declared a nature park by the Ministry of Environment and Forest. The length of the canyon inside the nature park is 2.750 km (1.709 mi). The nature park's operation was left to the Municipality of Orhaneli for a term of five years in 2015.
