= Güneykent =

- Municipality
- Location in Turkey
- Coordinates: 37°58′18″N 30°23′38″E
- Country: Turkey
- Province: Isparta
- District: Gönen
- Population (2022): 1,896
- Time zone: UTC+3 (TRT)

Güneykent is a town (belde) in the Gönen District of Isparta Province, Turkey. Its population is 1,896 (2022).
