= Sarıidris =

- Municipality
- Location in Turkey
- Coordinates: 37°56′38″N 31°00′29″E
- Country: Turkey
- Province: Isparta
- District: Eğirdir
- Population (2022): 2,188
- Time zone: UTC+3 (TRT)

Sarıidris is a town (belde) in the Eğirdir District, Isparta Province, Turkey. Its population is 2,188 (2022).
