= Senir, Keçiborlu =

Senir
- Municipality
- Location in Turkey
- Coordinates: 37°49′06″N 30°18′01″E
- Country: Turkey
- Province: Isparta
- District: Keçiborlu
- Population (2022): 2,197
- Time zone: UTC+3 (TRT)

Senir is a town (belde) in the Keçiborlu District, Isparta Province, Turkey. Its population is 2,197 (2022).
