= Şarkikaraağaç =

- Municipality
- Location in Turkey
- Coordinates: 38°04′49″N 31°21′57″E
- Country: Turkey
- Province: Isparta
- District: Şarkikaraağaç

Government
  - Mayor: Ali Göçer (AKP)
- Elevation: 1,168 m (3,832 ft)
- Population (2022): 10,128
- Time zone: UTC+3 (TRT)
- Postal code: 32800
- Area code: 0246
- Website: www.sarkikaraagac.bel.tr

Şarkikaraağaç is a town in Isparta Province in the Mediterranean Region of Anatolia (Asian Turkey). It is the seat of Şarkikaraağaç District. Its population is 10,128 (2022). It is the site of Ancient city and bishopric Hadrianopolis in Pisidia, which remains a Latin Catholic titular see.

Şarki means "eastern", karaağaç means "elm".

== History ==
See Hadrianopolis for Ancient namesakes

Hadrianopolis (in Pisidia) was important enough in the late Roman province of Pisidia to become one of the suffragan bishoprics of the Metropolitan of the capital Antioch, but was to fade.

=== Titular see ===
The diocese was nominally restored in 1933 as a Latin titular bishopric.

It is vacant since decades, having had the following incumbents of the fitting Episcopal (lowest) rank :

- Leo Aloysius Pursley (1950.07.22 – 1956.12.29) as Auxiliary Bishop of Fort Wayne (Indiana, USA) (1950.07.22 – 1956.12.29), until succeeding as last Bishop of Fort Wayne (1956.12.29 – 1960.05.28), later restyled as first Bishop of Fort Wayne–South Bend (USA) (1960.05.28 – retired 1976.08.24), died 1998
- Bernardino N. Mazzarella, Friars Minor (O.F.M.) (1957.07.20 – 1963.03.13) as Bishop-Prelate of the Territorial Prelature of Inmaculada Concepción de la B.V.M. en Olancho (Honduras) (1954 – 1963.03.13); later Bishop of Comayagua (Honduras) (1963.03.13 – death 1979.05.30)
- Filemón Castellano (1963.04.10 – 1970.12.20), on emeritate, formerly Bishop of Lomas de Zamora (Argentina) (1957.03.13 – 1963.04.10); died 1980.

== Sources and external links ==
- District governor's official website (in Turkish)
- GCatholic

Bibliography - ecclesiastical history

- Pius Bonifacius Gams, Series episcoporum Ecclesiae Catholicae, Leipzig 1931, p. 451
- Michel Lequien, Oriens christianus in quatuor Patriarchatus digestus, Paris 1740, vol. I, coll. 1049-1050
- Sylvain Destephen, 'Prosopographie chrétienne du Bas-Empire 3. Prosopographie du diocèse d'Asie (325-641), Paris 2008
