= Sozopolis (Pisidia) =

Town in the former Roman province of Pisidia

Coordinates: 38°04′21″N 30°28′14″E

Sozopolis in Pisidia (Ancient Greek: Σωζόπολις της Πισιδίας), which had been called Apollonia (Ἀπολλωνία) and Apollonias (Ἀπολλωνίας) during Seleucid times, was a town in the former Roman province of Pisidia, and is not to be confused with the Thracian Sozopolis in Haemimonto in present-day Bulgaria. Its site may correspond to present-day Uluborlu in Isparta Province, Turkey.

== Location ==
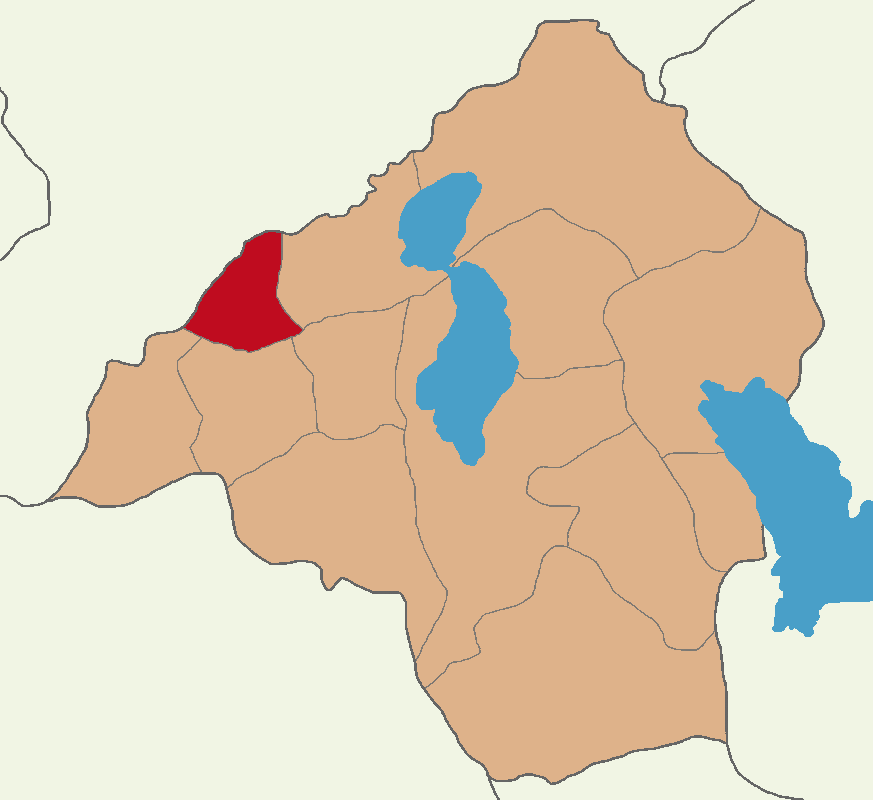
map of country round Sozopolis, Pisidia.

Sozopolis in Pisidia must have been situated in the border region of that province, since some ancient accounts place it in Phrygia. Whereas older source locate it "Souzon, south of Aglasoun"., modern scholars locate its site near Uluborlu, Isparta Province.

== History ==
Stephanus of Byzantium says that Apollonia in Pisidia (Sozopolis) was originally called Mordiaeon or Mordiaïon (Μορδιάιον), and was celebrated for its quinces. The coins of Apollonia record Alexander the Great as the founder, and also the name of a stream that flowed; by it, the Hippopharas. Two Greek inscriptions of the Roman period copied by Francis Arundell give the full title of the town in that age, "the Boule and Demus of the Apolloniatae Lycii Thraces Coloni," by which he concluded that the city was founded by a Thracian colony established in Lycia, but that conclusion is not universally accepted.

Fragments of the Res Gestae Divi Augusti in Greek have been found in the area.

Sozopolis in Pisidia was the birthplace of Severus of Antioch (born around 456).

The icon of the Theotokos of Pisidian Sozopolis, celebrated by Eastern Orthodox Christians on 3 September, originated in this city. As many other places in the region, the town venerated especially the Archangel Michael and had a church dedicated to him.

== Bishopric ==
Sozopolis sent its bishop and possibly two other representatives to the Council of Constantinople in 381, and its bishop attended the Council of Ephesus in 431.

The see is included in the Catholic Church's list of titular sees.
