= Keçiborlu =

- Municipality
- Location in Turkey
- Coordinates: 37°56′35″N 30°18′08″E
- Country: Turkey
- Province: Isparta
- District: Keçiborlu

Government
  - Mayor: Yusuf Murat Parlak (AKP)
- Elevation: 1,010 m (3,310 ft)
- Population (2022): 7,044
- Time zone: UTC+3 (TRT)
- Postal code: 32700
- Area code: 0246
- Website: www.keciborlu.bel.tr

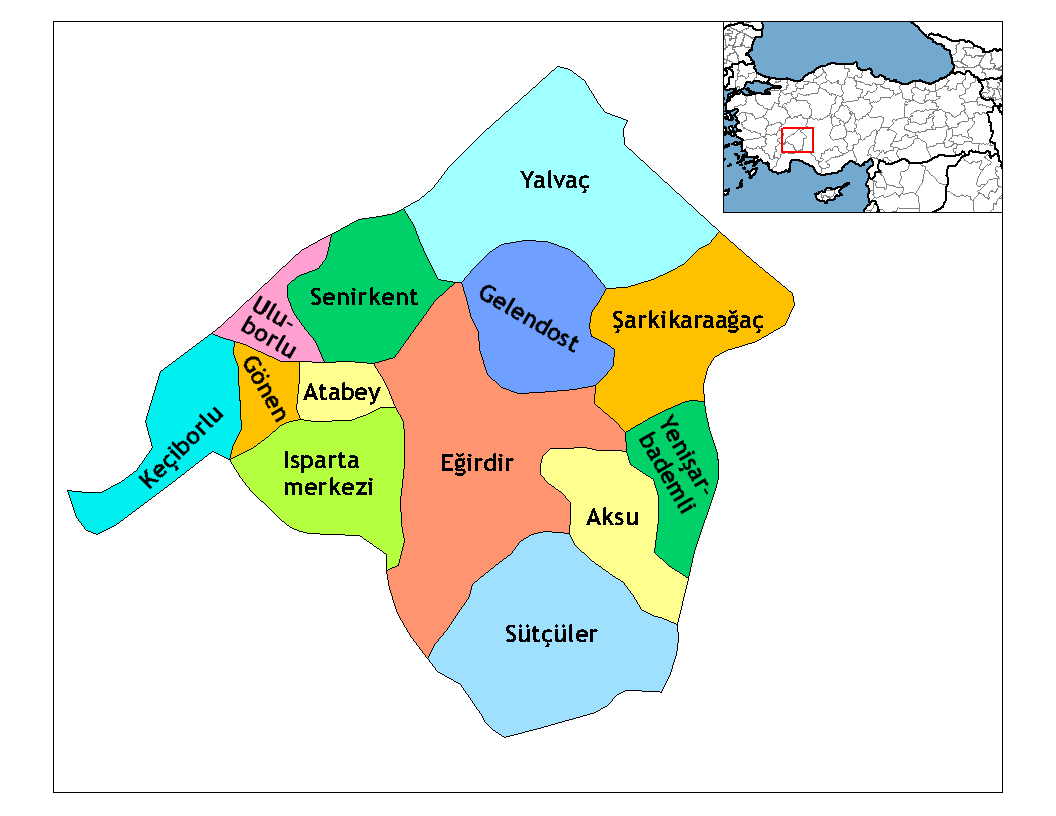
Map of Isparta districts with Keçiborlu on the far left.

Keçiborlu is a town in Isparta Province in the Mediterranean region of Turkey. It is the seat of Keçiborlu District. Its population is 7,044 (2022).

== Etymology ==
The town was known as Eudoxipolis (Ευδοξίπολη in Greek) during the Roman and early Byzantine periods. By the 12th century it was known as Sublaeum.

== History ==
Keçiborlu is known as the site where Atlasjet Flight 4203 crashed on November 30, 2007.

== Economy ==
In the early 20th-century, sulphur was mined in the area.
