= Adrianópolis, Manaus =

Adrianópolis
- Neighbourhood
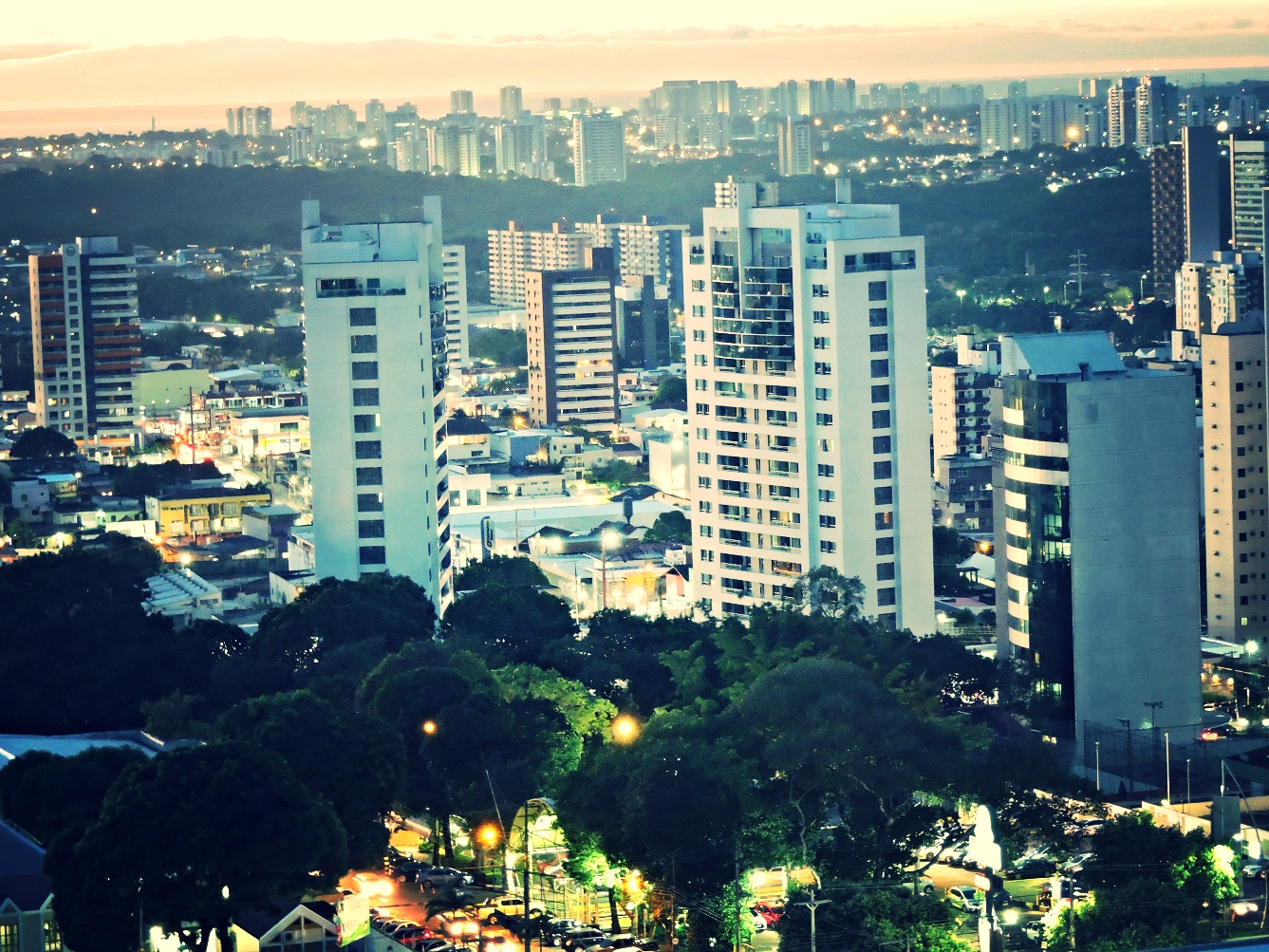
- Interactive map of Adrianópolis
- Coordinates: 3.1016961°S 60.01004879°W
- Country: Brazil
- Region: North
- State: Amazonas
- Municipality: Manaus
- Administrative Zone: South-Central Zone

Adrianopólis is an upper class neighborhood in the South-Central Zone of Manaus, Amazonas.

The neighborhood's Human Development Index (HDI) is very high, and is the largest of the city's neighborhoods and similar to that of Norway. Its old name was Vila Municipal (Town Village), by its origins related to small villages. According to research related to the quality of life in the city's neighborhoods, the neighborhood is named one of the best in Manaus.

The neighborhood came from villages built by workers who worked in the city center. It had an area extremely green and wooded by the set of sites and farms.

The neighborhood brings, in its memories, the old tramway station, where today is the Nossa Senhora de Nazaré square; And the Ida Nelson Baptist Institute, where once an American radio station had functioned.

It is possible to return to the time of the old farms, when traveling through Recife street, its main avenue of access and observe the immense chestnut trees and fruit trees that still exist in the neighborhood. However, much of this green area gave way to the largest shopping center in the city of northern Brazil: Manauara Shopping, inaugurated in 2009. The neighborhood is currently in a high verticalization process, with the construction of large buildings for the hotel sector and the condominiums of high standard.

In the neighborhood, there are also the National Sports Club, where its headquarters operates; The Castelinho, house of peculiar architecture; The Plaza Chile and its centenary trees, among other beauties that the neighborhood provides.
