= Karanlık Canyon =

Canyon in Erzincan Province, Turkey

- Karanlık Kanyon
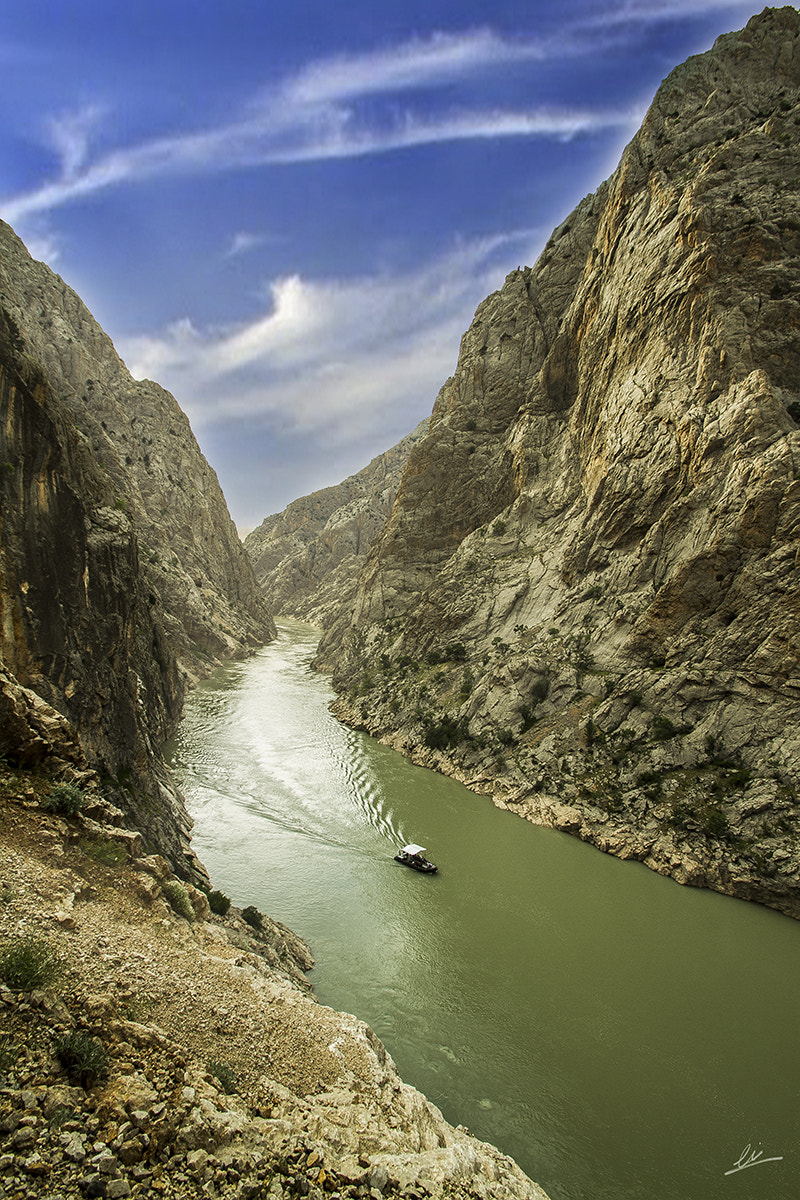
- Karanlık Canyon and Karasu River

- Location within Turkey
- Length: 25 km (16 mi)
- Depth: 1,000 m (3,300 ft)

Geography
- Location: İliç-Kemaliye, Erzincan Province, Turkey
- Coordinates: 39°16′11.97″N 38°29′51.43″E
- Rivers: Karasu River
- Interactive map of Karanlık Canyon

Karanlık Canyon (Turkish: Karanlık Kanyon), literally "Dark Canyon", is a deep steep-sided gorge located between the İliç and Kemaliye districts of Erzincan Province, Turkey, formed by Karasu River on the Munzur Mountains.

The Munzur Mountains, which run in about east–west direction, are split by north–south directed narrow valleys formed by streams. The formation in Kemaliye area, created by Karasu River, is called Kemaliye Pass (Turkish: Kemaliye Boğazı). Its part between the Bağıştaş village of İliç and the Dutluca village of Kemaliye is named Karanlık Canyon. The canyon is 25 km (16 mi) long, 1,000 m (3,300 ft) deep and 10–15 m (33–49 ft) wide at the base featuring almost 90% rocky slope gradient.

The canyon offers outdoor recreational activities such as rock climbing and boat rides.
