= Çarıksaraylar =

- Municipality
- Location in Turkey
- Coordinates: 38°7′6″N 31°25′1″E
- Country: Turkey
- Province: Isparta
- District: Şarkikaraağaç
- Population (2022): 2,677
- Time zone: UTC+3 (TRT)

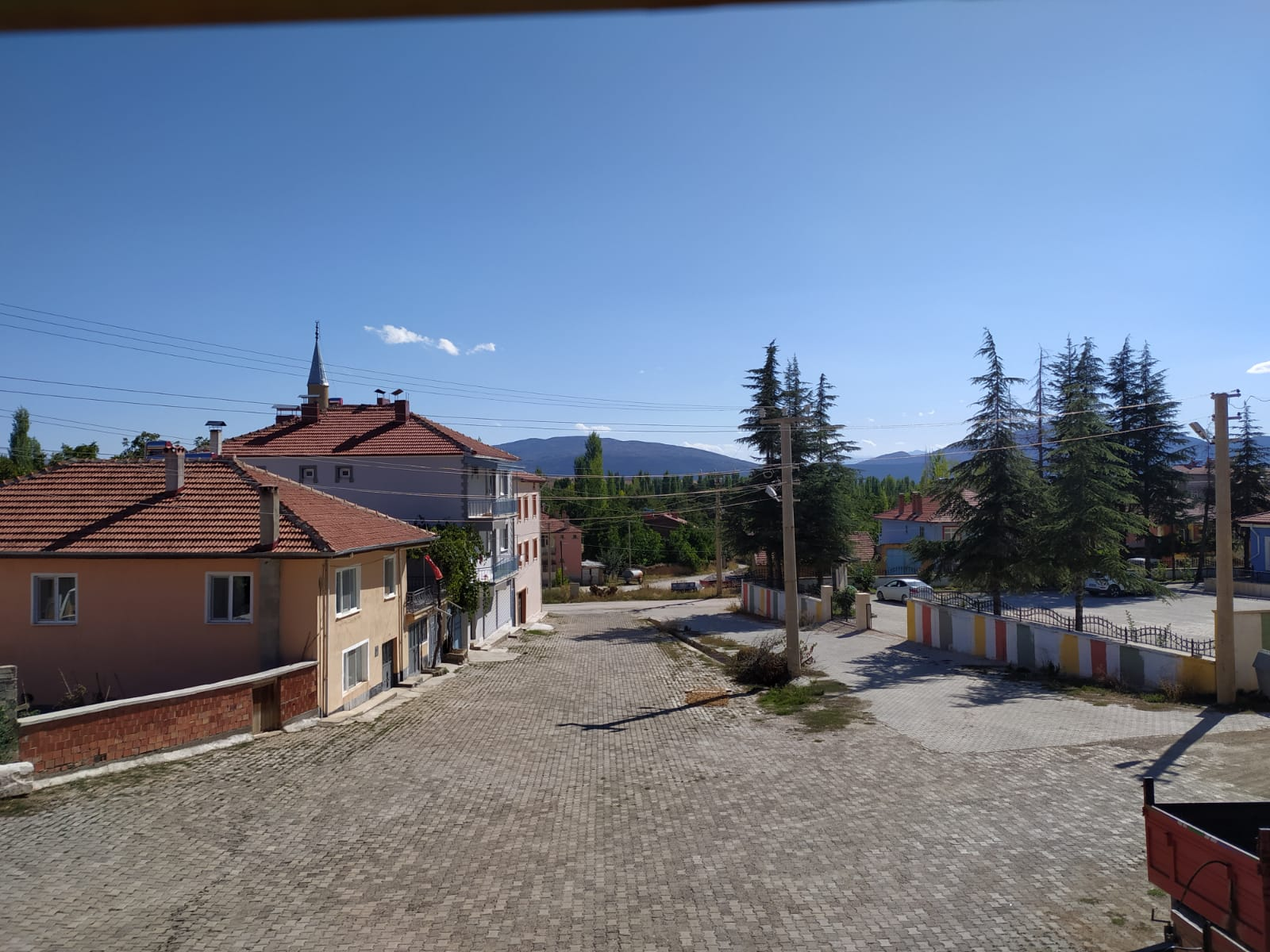
Çarıksaraylar

Çarıksaraylar is a town (belde) in the Şarkikaraağaç District, Isparta Province, Turkey. Its population is 2,677 (2022).
