= Çiçekpınar, Şarkikaraağaç =

Çiçekpınar
- Municipality
- Location in Turkey
- Coordinates: 38°3′59″N 31°19′8″E
- Country: Turkey
- Province: Isparta
- District: Şarkikaraağaç
- Population (2022): 1,982
- Time zone: UTC+3 (TRT)

Çiçekpınar is a town (belde) in the Şarkikaraağaç District, Isparta Province, Turkey. Its population is 1,982 (2022).
