= Hadrianopolis (Phrygia) =

Town in ancient Phrygia

Coordinates: 38°08′41″N 31°40′41″E

Hadrianopolis or Hadrianoupolis (Ancient Greek: Ἁδριανούπολις) was a town in ancient Phrygia, built by the emperor Hadrian, between Philomelium and Tyriaeum. It was a bishopric, whose bishop attended the Council of Chalcedon and the Second Council of Constantinople.

Its site is located near Doğanhisar in Asiatic Turkey.
