= Aksu, Isparta =

Aksu
- Municipality
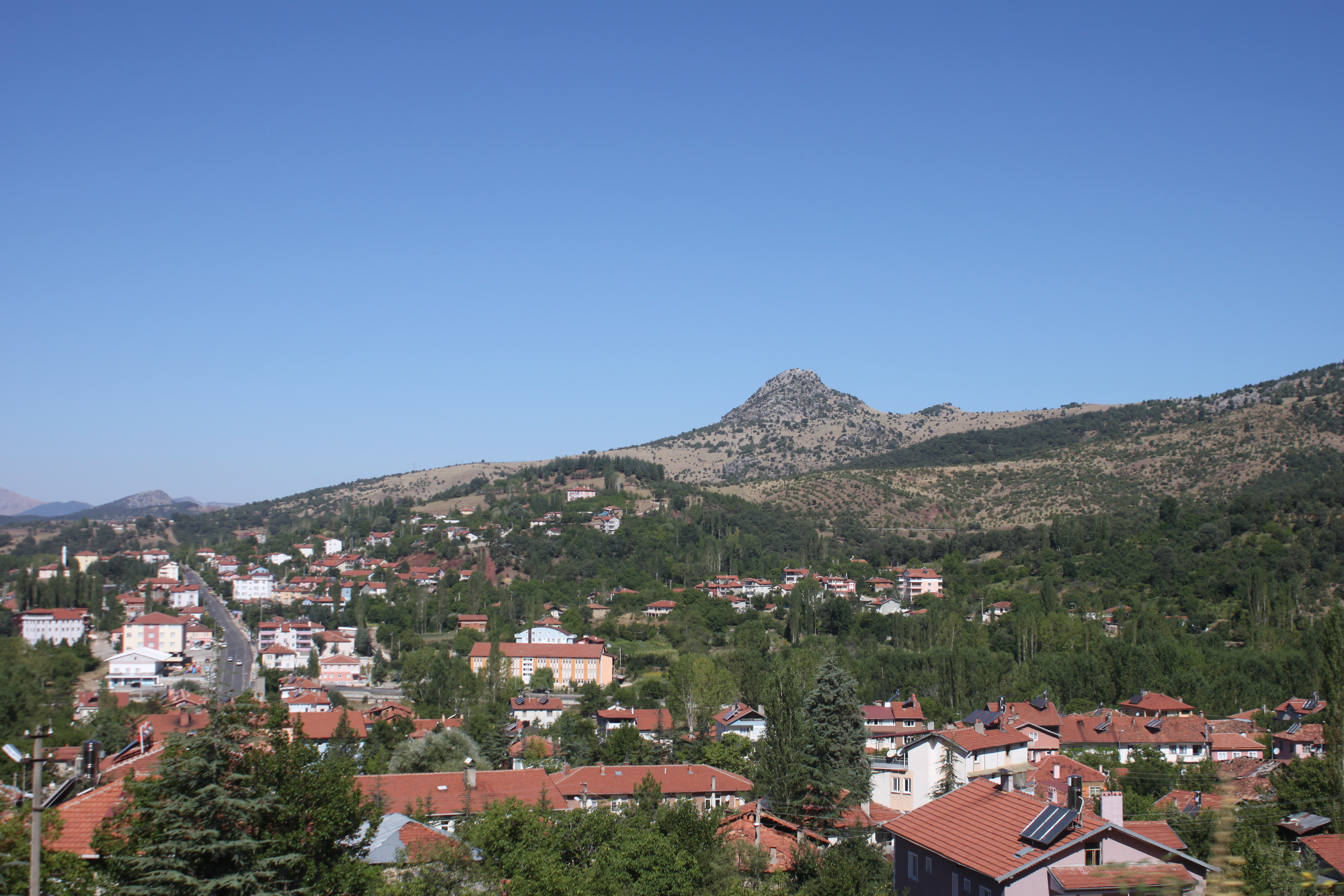
- Aksu, view to the northeast.

- Location within Turkey
- Coordinates: 37°47′56″N 31°04′16″E
- Country: Turkey
- Province: Isparta
- District: Aksu

Government
  - Mayor: Veli Kahraman
- Population (2022): 1,898
- Time zone: UTC+3 (TRT)
- Postal code: 32510
- Area code: 0246

Aksu is a town in Isparta Province in the Mediterranean Region of Turkey. It is the seat of Aksu District. Its population is 1,898 (2022).
