= Sütçüler =

- Municipality
- Location in Turkey
- Coordinates: 37°29′40″N 30°58′54″E
- Country: Turkey
- Province: Isparta
- District: Sütçüler

Government
  - Mayor: İsmail Yurdabak (AKP)
- Population (2022): 2,473
- Time zone: UTC+3 (TRT)
- Postal code: 32950
- Area code: 0246
- Website: www.sutculer.bel.tr

Sütçüler is a town in Isparta Province in the Mediterranean Region of Turkey. It is the seat of Sütçüler District. Its population is 2,473 (2022).

== See also ==
- Yazılı Canyon Nature Park
