= Atabey =

- Municipality
- Location in Turkey
- Coordinates: 37°57′03″N 30°38′19″E
- Country: Turkey
- Province: Isparta
- District: Atabey

Government
  - Mayor: Serdar Pehlivan (AKP)
- Elevation: 1,040 m (3,410 ft)
- Population (2022): 4,651
- Time zone: UTC+3 (TRT)
- Postal code: 32670
- Area code: 0246
- Website: www.atabey.bel.tr

Atabey is a town in Isparta Province in the Mediterranean region of Turkey. It is the seat of Atabey District. Its population is 4,651 (2022). The mayor is Serdar Pehlivan.
