= Senirkent =

- Municipality
- Location in Turkey
- Coordinates: 38°06′29″N 30°33′00″E
- Country: Turkey
- Province: Isparta
- District: Senirkent

Government
  - Mayor: Hüseyin Baykal (MHP)
- Elevation: 970 m (3,180 ft)
- Population (2022): 4,548
- Time zone: UTC+3 (TRT)
- Postal code: 32600
- Area code: 0246
- Website: www.senirkent.bel.tr

Senirkent is a town in Isparta Province in the Mediterranean Region of Turkey. It is the seat of Senirkent District. Its population is 4,548 (2022). It lies in the Turkish Lakes Region. The mayor is Hüseyin Baykal (MHP).

== Climate ==
Senirkent has a hot-summer Mediterranean climate (Köppen: Csa), with hot, dry summers, and cold, moderately wet winters.

Climate data for Senirkent (1991–2020)
Month	Jan	Feb	Mar	Apr	May	Jun	Jul	Aug	Sep	Oct	Nov	Dec	Year
Mean daily maximum °C (°F)	6.4 (43.5)	8.5 (47.3)	13.0 (55.4)	17.8 (64.0)	23.2 (73.8)	28.0 (82.4)	32.0 (89.6)	32.1 (89.8)	27.8 (82.0)	21.4 (70.5)	14.2 (57.6)	8.2 (46.8)	19.4 (66.9)
Daily mean °C (°F)	1.4 (34.5)	3.0 (37.4)	7.0 (44.6)	11.4 (52.5)	16.3 (61.3)	20.9 (69.6)	24.6 (76.3)	24.4 (75.9)	19.7 (67.5)	13.8 (56.8)	7.2 (45.0)	3.1 (37.6)	12.8 (55.0)
Mean daily minimum °C (°F)	−2.7 (27.1)	−1.6 (29.1)	1.4 (34.5)	5.1 (41.2)	9.1 (48.4)	13.0 (55.4)	16.1 (61.0)	15.9 (60.6)	11.4 (52.5)	7.0 (44.6)	1.8 (35.2)	−0.8 (30.6)	6.3 (43.3)
Average precipitation mm (inches)	88.65 (3.49)	76.26 (3.00)	77.87 (3.07)	68.56 (2.70)	60.35 (2.38)	37.35 (1.47)	16.8 (0.66)	14.59 (0.57)	23.18 (0.91)	48.4 (1.91)	62.16 (2.45)	96.24 (3.79)	670.41 (26.39)
Average precipitation days (≥ 1.0 mm)	8.7	7.9	7.9	8.1	7.5	4.9	2.9	2.9	3.3	5.0	5.4	8.7	73.2
Average relative humidity (%)	70.0	65.9	59.5	56.7	55.2	49.5	42.0	43.0	47.7	58.3	64.8	70.7	56.9
Source: NOAA
