= Gelendost =

- Municipality
- Location in Turkey
- Coordinates: 38°07′18″N 31°00′52″E
- Country: Turkey
- Province: Isparta
- District: Gelendost

Government
  - Mayor: İsmail Kurtbolat (acting) (İYİ)
- Elevation: 920 m (3,020 ft)
- Population (2022): 5,279
- Time zone: UTC+3 (TRT)
- Postal code: 32900
- Area code: 0246
- Website: www.gelendost.bel.tr

Gelendost is a town in Isparta Province in the Mediterranean Region of Turkey. It is the seat of Gelendost District. Its population is 5,279 (2022).
