= Yenişarbademli =

- Municipality
- Location in Turkey
- Coordinates: 37°42′26″N 31°23′16″E
- Country: Turkey
- Province: Isparta
- District: Yenişarbademli

Government
  - Mayor: Mehmet Özata (AKP)
- Elevation: 1,050 m (3,440 ft)
- Population (2022): 2,411
- Time zone: UTC+3 (TRT)
- Postal code: 32850
- Area code: 0246
- Website: www.yenisarbademli.bel.tr

Yenişarbademli is a town in Isparta Province in the Mediterranean Region of Turkey. It is the seat of Yenişarbademli District. Its population is 2,411 (2022).

== Location ==
The district center lies at a distance of five kilometers to the west from Lake Beyşehir. The remains of the thirteenth century Anatolian Seljuk palace of Kubadabad on the lake shore are located very near the town, although their locality administratively depends the neighboring Beyşehir district.

== Unique characteristics ==
Yenişarbademli is also notable in having Pınargözü Cave, the longest cave as it stands in Turkey, which is situated at a distance of 8 kilometers to the south of the center town, in the dense woodlands of the Taurus Mountains. The cave's length is at least 12 kilometers, as reached by a joint Turkish-British-French team in 1991, while its exact extension is estimated to reach 15 km (9 mi).

== See also ==
- Lake Beyşehir
- Kubadabad Palace
