= Hadrianopolis (Pisidia) =

Town in ancient Pisidia

Coordinates: 37°30′25″N 30°02′36″E

Hadrianopolis or Hadrianoupolis (Ancient Greek: Ἁδριανούπολις), also known as Hadriani, was a town in ancient Pisidia.

Its site is located near Eğnes in Asiatic Turkey.
