= Yalvaç =

- Municipality
- Location in Turkey
- Coordinates: 38°17′44″N 31°10′48″E
- Country: Turkey
- Province: Isparta
- District: Yalvaç

Government
  - Mayor: Mustafa Kodal (AKP)
- Elevation: 1,150 m (3,770 ft)
- Population (2022): 22,538
- Time zone: UTC+3 (TRT)
- Postal code: 32400
- Area code: 0246
- Website: www.yalvac.bel.tr

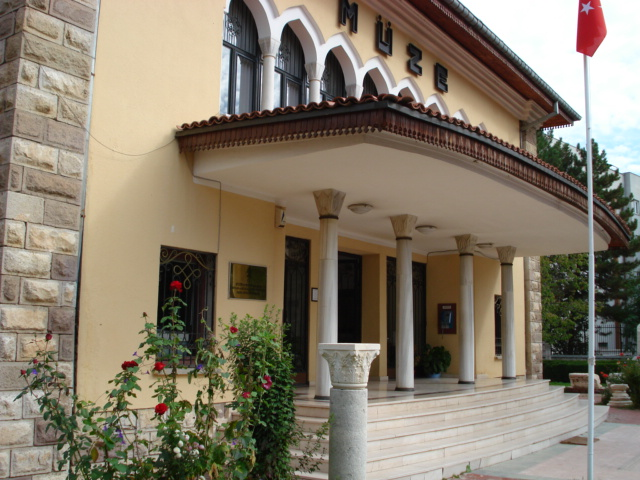
Yalvaç Museum

Yalvaç is a town of Isparta Province in the Mediterranean Region of Turkey. It is the seat of Yalvaç District. Its population is 22,538 (2022). The ruins of ancient Antioch of Pisidia are 1 km northeast of the town.

== International relations ==
=== Twin towns - Sister cities ===
Yalvaç is twinned with:

- Bethlehem, Palestine

== Image gallery ==
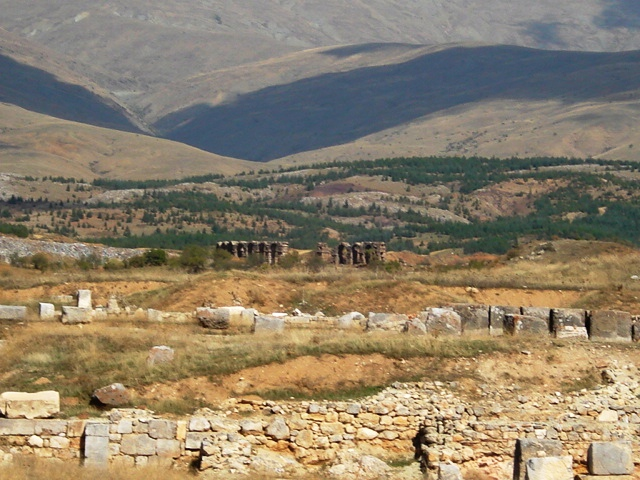
A panorama of Antioch, Pisidia.

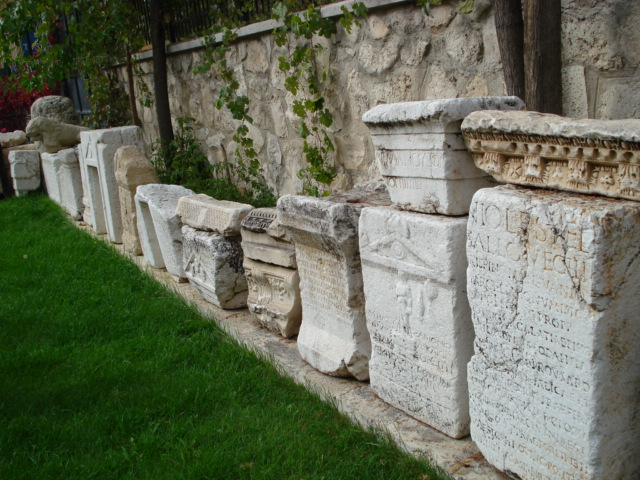
A detail from Yalvaç museum.

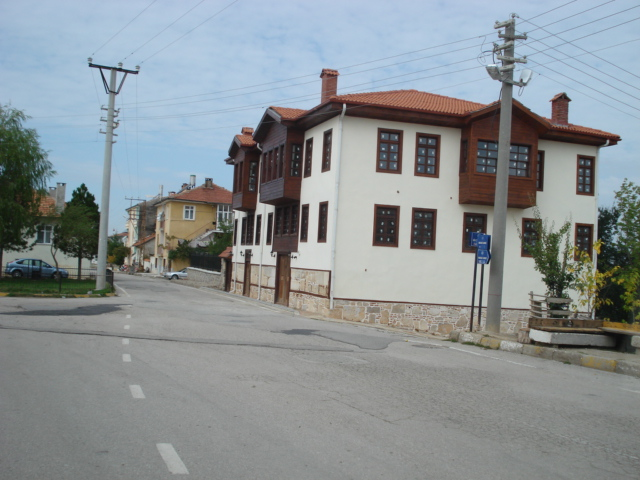
A traditional Yalvaç house.

== See also ==
- Yalvaç Basin
