= Uluborlu =

- Municipality
- Location in Turkey
- Coordinates: 38°04′44″N 30°26′54″E
- Country: Turkey
- Province: Isparta
- District: Uluborlu

Government
  - Mayor: Ahmet Oğuz Bakır (AKP)
- Elevation: 1,100 m (3,600 ft)
- Population (2022): 5,635
- Time zone: UTC+3 (TRT)
- Postal code: 32650
- Area code: 0246
- Website: www.uluborlu.bel.tr

Uluborlu is a town in Isparta Province in the Mediterranean Region of Turkey. It is the seat of [] and has a population of 5,635 (2022). Uluborlu has been identified as the ancient town of Sozopolis.

== History ==
Throughout history, Uluborlu has been on the military and commercial crossroads of Asia minor which has shaped its character. The settlement is known from prehistoric times and was called either Sozopolis or Apollonia. In early historic times it was part of Phrygia.

It fell to Alexander the Great in the 330s BC. Following Alexander's death it passed to the Asian arm of the Seleucid Empire and then the Attalid kingdom (188–133 BC) for 130 years. Subsequently, it was ceded to the Romans and formed part of the province of Asia until the division of the Roman Empire in 395 AD. Sozopolis remained then part of the Byzantine Empire until 1074 when it passed into the hands of the Seljuk Turks, though returning briefly to Byzantine control in the years 1119-1120. In 1403 Timur seized the city and its men were killed as retribution for their defence of the city, while the women and children were taken captive.

During the Ottoman period of the 15th and 16th centuries Uluborlu prospered and supported the new dynasty. Hamid Sanjak held the first census of Uluborlu in 1831. In 1911 Uluborlu suffered a great fire. In 1963 the municipality of Uluborlu was established.

== Economy ==
Agriculture dominated the economy of the town. Especially known for its cherry production but apples, quince, and pears are also grown, with Britain, Germany, the Netherlands and Belgium the main markets. Tourism is also a growing industry with spectators coming to the annual wrestling festival.

== See also ==
- Uluborlu Dam
