= Isparta Province =

Province of Turkey

Coordinates: 37°57′24″N 30°57′39″E

Isparta Province Isparta ili
- Province
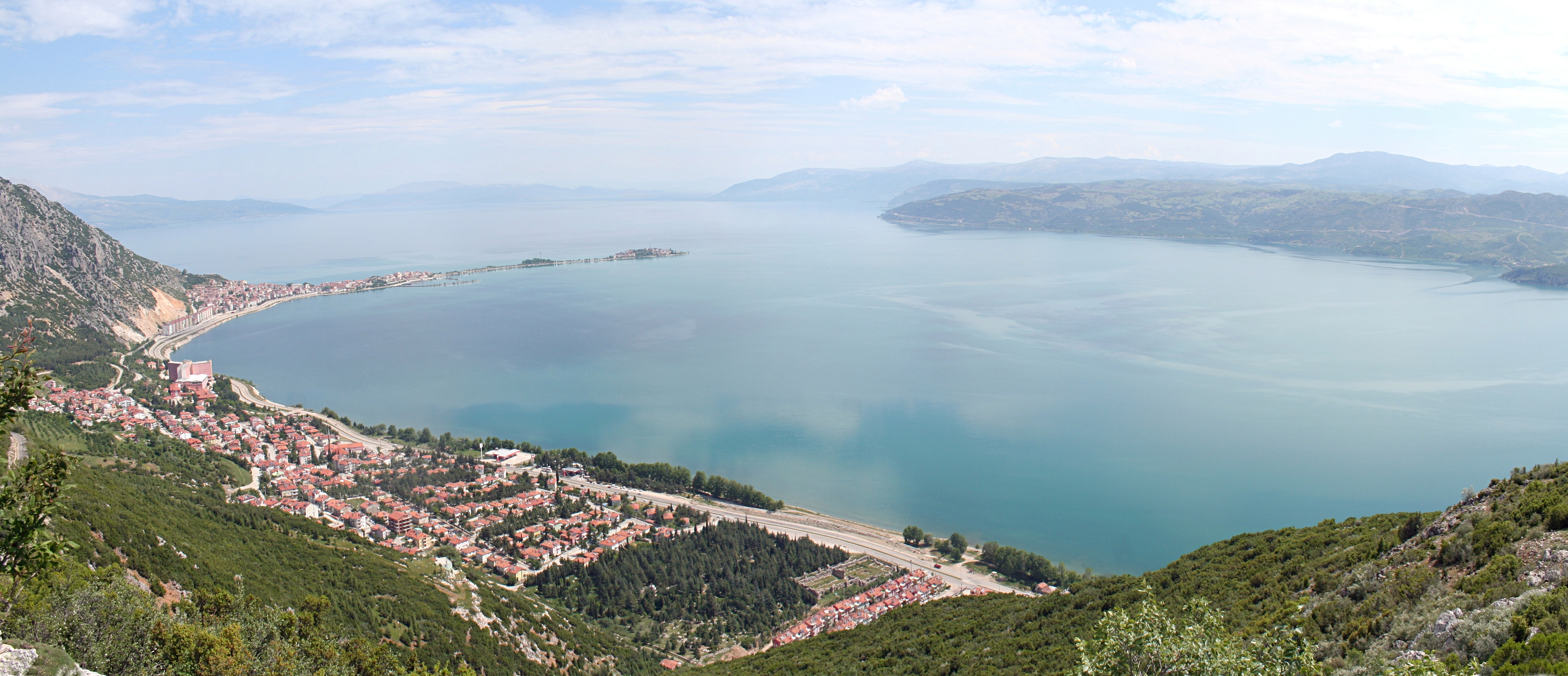
- Lake Eğirdir

- Location of the province within Turkey
- Country: Turkey
- Seat: Isparta

Government
  - Governor: Abdullah Erin
- Area: 8,946 km^{2} (3,454 sq mi)
- Population (2024): 449,777
  - Density: 50.28/km^{2} (130.2/sq mi)
- Time zone: UTC+3 (TRT)
- Area code: 0246
- Website: www.isparta.gov.tr

Isparta Province (Turkish: Isparta ili) is a province in southwestern Turkey. Its adjacent provinces are Afyon to the northwest, Burdur to the southwest, Antalya to the south, and Konya to the east. Its area is 8,946 km^{2}, and its population is 445,325 (2022). The provincial capital is Isparta.

The province is well known for producing apples, sour cherries, grapes, roses and rose products, and carpets. The best fertile lands are in Uluborlu. The province is situated in the Göller Bölgesi (Lakes Area) of Turkey's Mediterranean Region and has many freshwater lakes.

== Districts ==
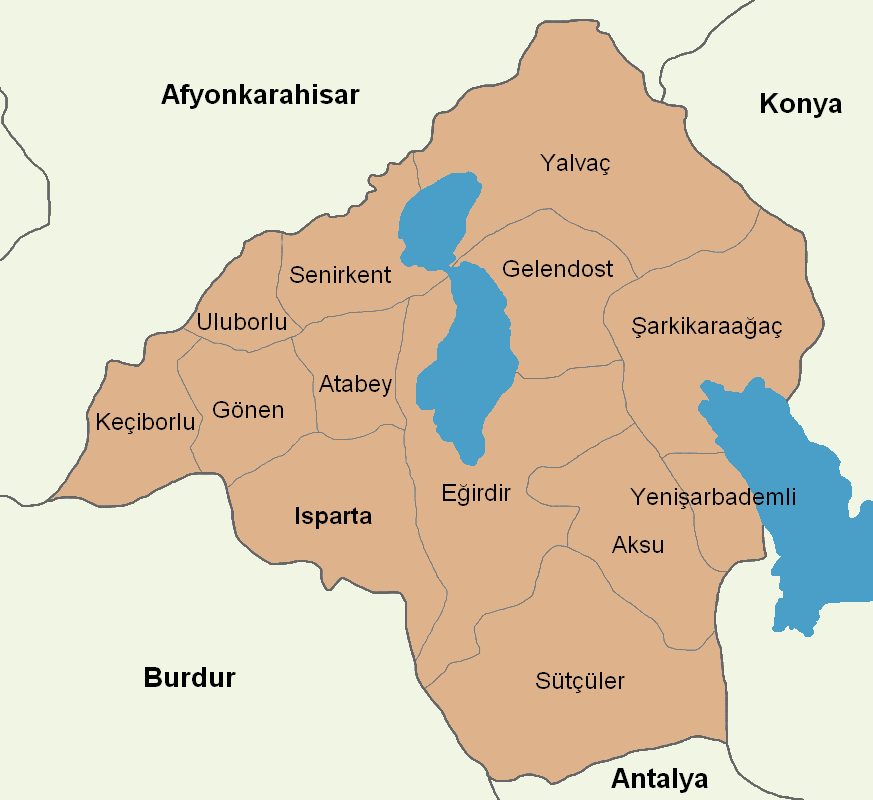

Isparta province is divided into 13 districts (capital district in bold):

- Aksu
- Atabey
- Eğirdir
- Gelendost
- Gönen
- **Isparta**
- Keçiborlu
- Şarkikaraağaç
- Senirkent
- Sütçüler
- Uluborlu
- Yalvaç
- Yenişarbademli

== Geography ==
Isparta lies in the northernmost part of the Pamphylian basin, wedged between the continental Bey Dağları and Anatolian blocks. This area is known as the Isparta Angle. The Isparta Angle is a result of the Anatolian Plate's rotation from the early Paleocene to the early Pliocene, and is a very seismically active area as a result.

== Economy ==
As of 2012, there are 178,162 hectares of agricultural land in Isparta province, of which 28.8% (37,184 ha) is used for fruit growing.

Isparta province accounts for 23.4% of all apple production in Turkey as of 2012. The majority of the province's apple production is done in three districts: Eğirdir, Gelendost, and Senirkent. Together, these three districts account for 73.2% of the province's apple production.

== Notable people ==
- Erkan Mumcu
- Necmettin Sadak
- Süleyman Demirel
- Zeki Demirkubuz

== Gallery ==
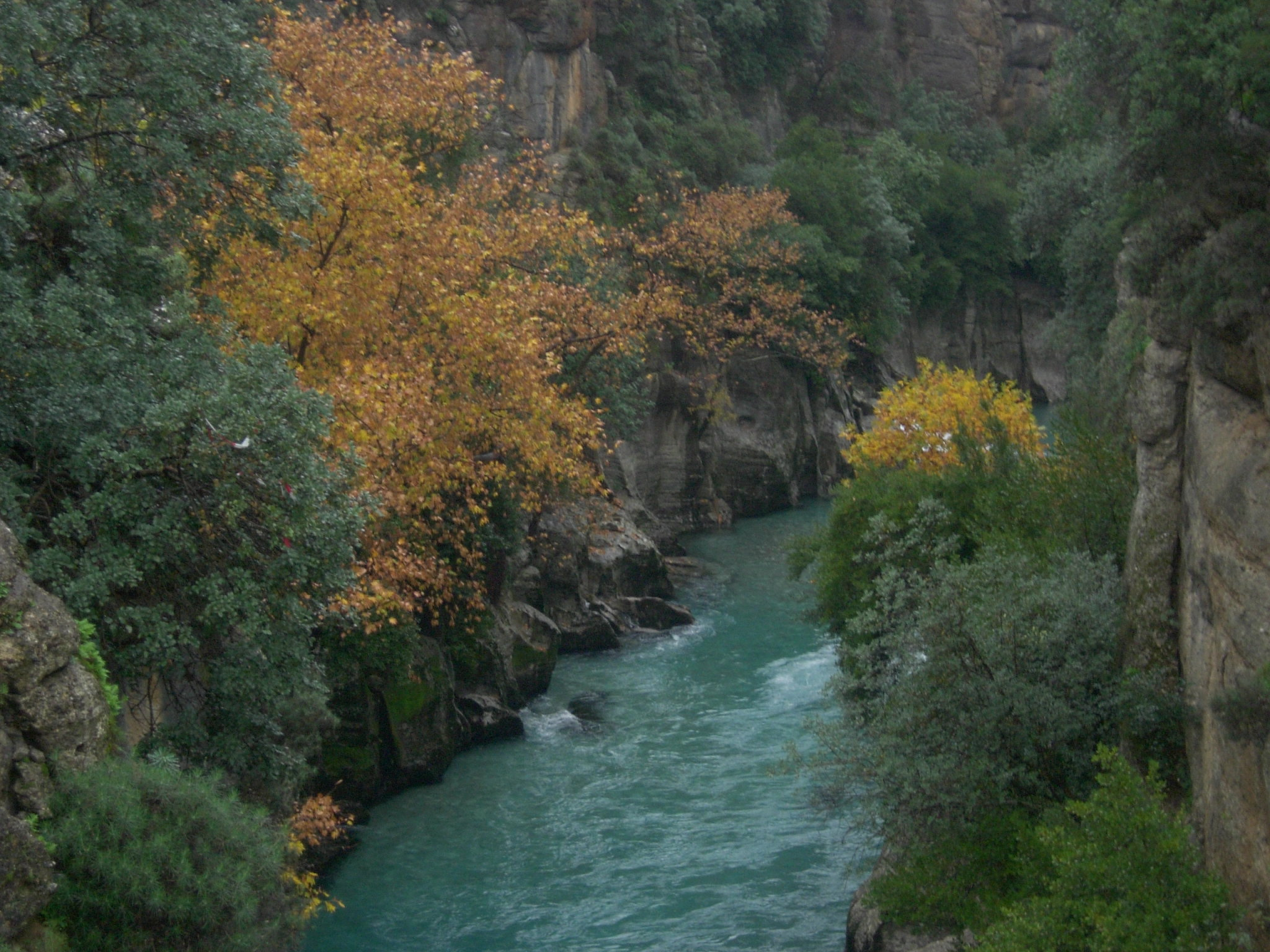
Köprülü Canyon in Sütçüler district

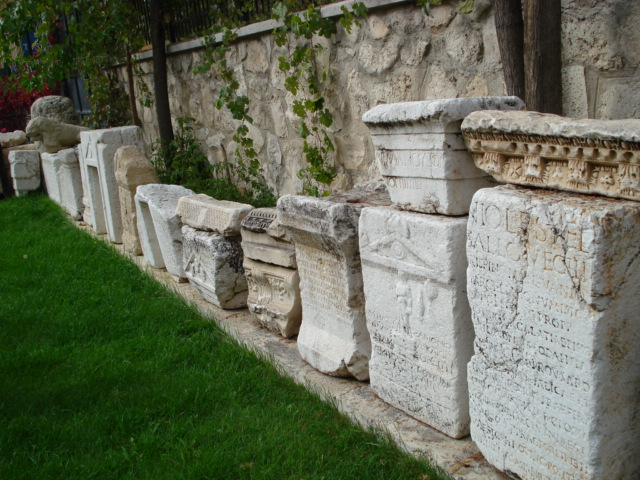
Ancient Roman inscriptions in Yalvaç

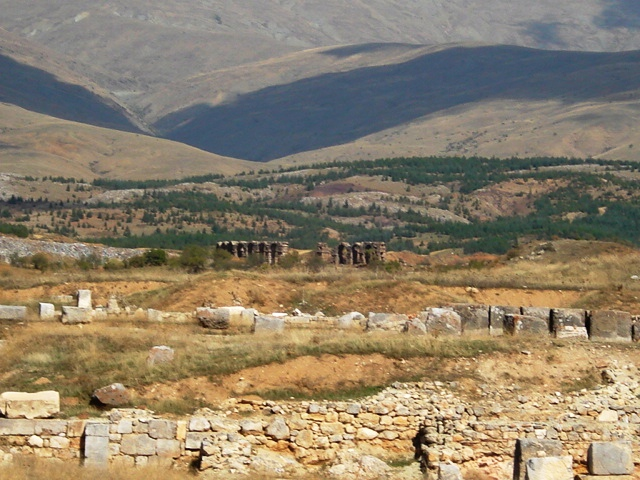
Antioch, Pisidia in Yalvaç district

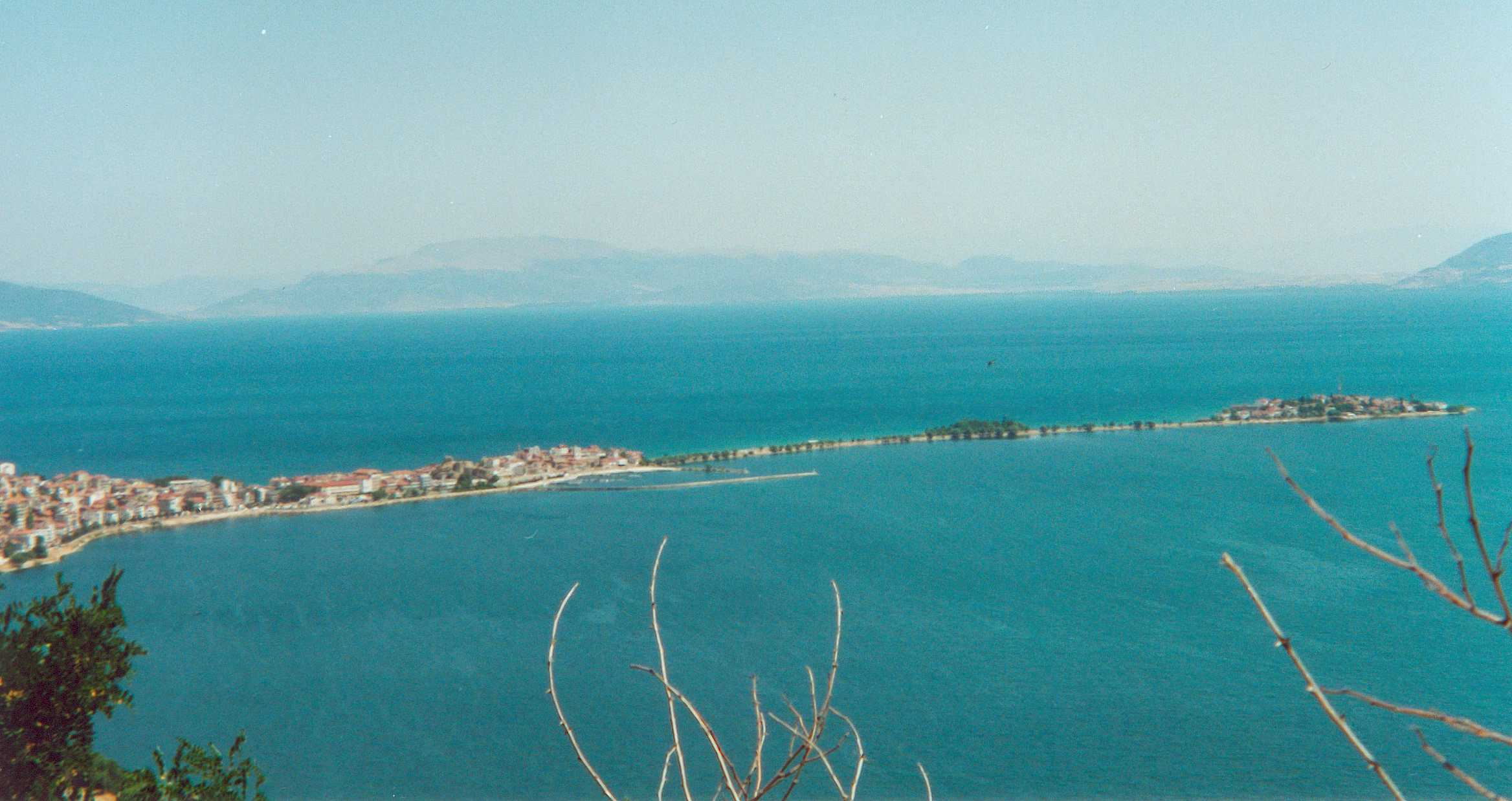
Lake Eğirdir in Eğirdir district

== See also ==
- List of populated places in Isparta Province
- Lake Gölcük (Isparta)
