= Dündar Bey Medrese =

Historical madrasa in Eğirdir, Turkey

- Turkish: Dündar Bey Medresesi
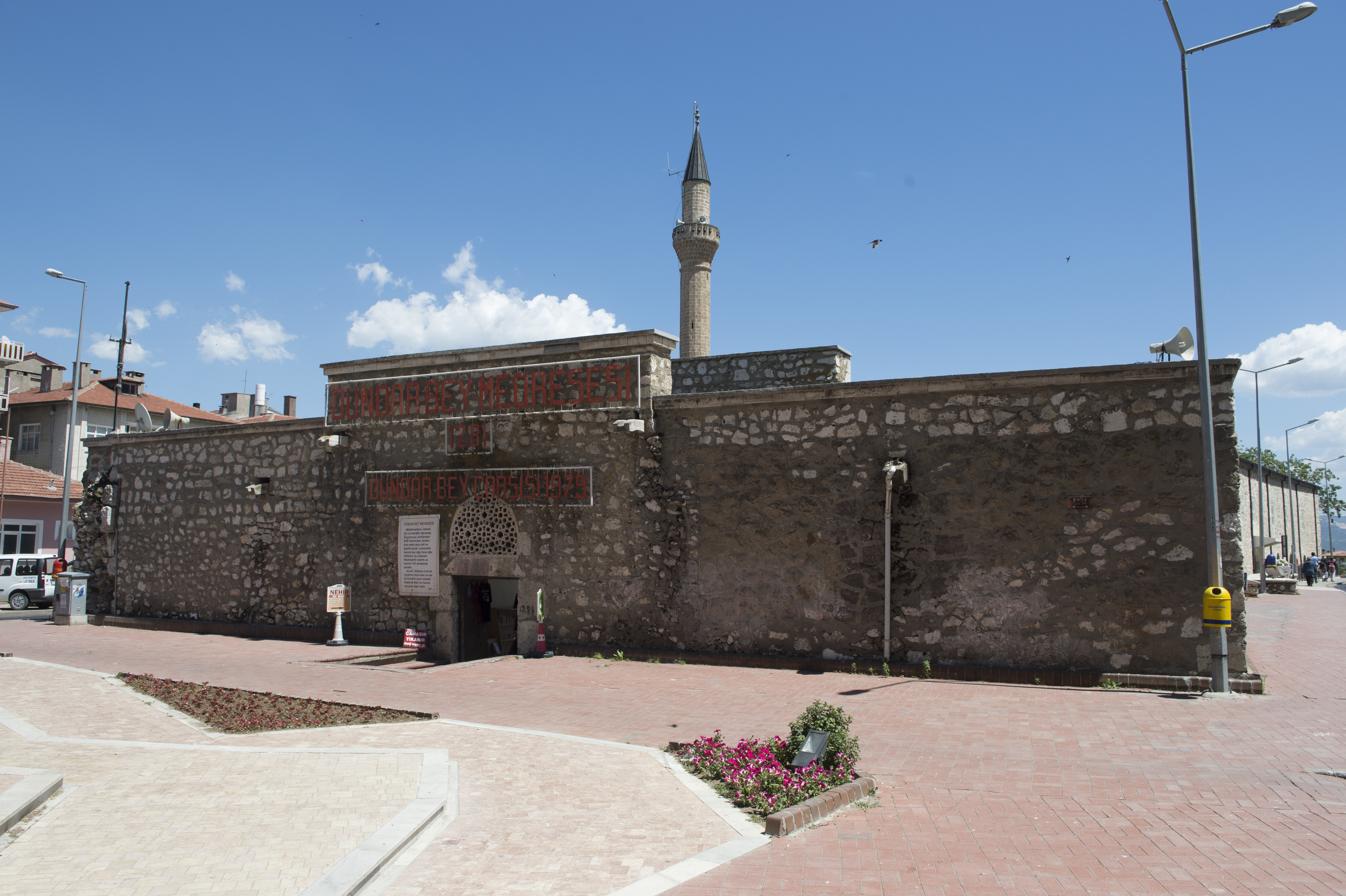

Location
- Eğirdir; Turkey; 37°52′31″N 30°51′02″E

Information
- Type: madrasa
- Religious affiliation: Islam
- Established: 1301

Dündar Bey Medrese (Turkish: Dündar Bey Medresesi), also called Taş Medrese ("Stone Madrasa"), is a historical madrasa in Eğirdir, Turkey. Madrasa is a medieval Islamic educational institution. In the 1960s, it was restored, and is now used as a bazaar.

== Location ==
The madrasa building is in Eğirdir, an ilçe (district) of Isparta Province. Eğirdir Castle is to the east of the madrasa. Its distance to Isparta is 34 kilometres (21 mi). It is situated in the town and close to the Lake Eğirdir.

== Background ==
The commissioner of the madrasa was Dündar Bey of Hamidoğlu Anatolian beylik. Just like other beyliks of the era, he emerged during the last phase of Seljuks of Anatolia. His suzerain was the Mongol Empire. The capital of his beylik was Eğirdir, now a resort town, then an important city. The madrasa was built during this period about 1301. Although Dündar was later killed by the Mongols, his sons managed to continue the beylik up until the Ottoman conquest in 1391.

== The building ==
The madrasa was built in 1301. It was adjacent to the now-extinct city walls. It is a two storey building with two iwans and an open cloister. It has two inscriptions. The one on the iwan is about Dündar Bey and the other one on the crown gate is about Keyhusrev II (1237-1246 ), a Seljukid sultan and not a contemporary of Dündar. The gate was from a former caravanserai built by the sultan close to Eğirdir. There are also some other collected material in the building, such as Byzantine column capitals.
