= Emre Özdemir =

Emre Özdemir (born 1981) was an editorial cartoonist and illustrator for Zaman and Today's Zaman.

== Early life and career ==
In 2005, Özdemir graduated from Balıkesir University. That year, he began to draw a comic strip in the sports magazine of Zaman called “Sporvizyon”. In 2007, he completed his master's degree at Marmara University Atatürk Faculty of Education. Also in 2007, he began to draw editorial cartoons for the newspaper Today's Zaman and Zaman under his blog called “No Comment”. Between 2007 and 2009 he worked as Turkish Language Lecturer at the Russian State University for the Humanities. He is currently drawing illustration and editorial cartoons for some newspapers, magazines and books.

== Awards ==
In 2003, he was awarded first prize in the competition organized by the Museum of Antiquities in Burdur.

In 2008, he was awarded with an Honorary Mention in “City Confusion” competition held in Iran.
