= Mubariz al-Din =

Mubariz al-Din may refer to:

- Mubariz al-Din Isfendiyar, Beg of Candar from 1385 to 1440
- Mubariz al-Din Ishak, Beg of Hamid from 1328 by 1335
- Mubariz al-Din Muhammad, founding ruler of the Muzaffarids from 1314 to 1358

== See also ==
- Mubariz, name
