= Felek al-Din Dündar =

Beg of Hamid from c. 1300 to 1326

- Sultan; Malik al-umara; Ispahsalar
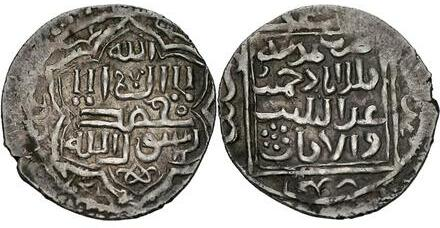
- Coin minted in Felekabad 1321/2 without an overlord.

Beg of Hamid
- Reign: 1300 – 1324 or October 1326
- Predecessor: Ilyas
- Successor: Badr al-Din Hizr
- Died: 1324 or October 1326; Antalya, Beylik of Teke
- Issue: Ishak; Mehmed
- Dynasty: Hamidid
- Father: Ilyas
- Religion: Islam

Felek al-Din Dündar Beg (died 1324 or October 1326) was Beg (ruler) of Hamid, in southwestern Anatolia, from c. 1300 until his death. After rising to power, Felek al-Din changed his headquarters from Uluborlu to Eğirdir, which he renamed to Felekabad after himself. Although Dündar occasionally declared his loyalty to the Ilkhanate in the east, he expanded his territory in times of internal struggles the Ilkhanate faced. He captured Antalya and appointed his brother Yunus as its ruler, forming the Teke branch of the Hamidids. Emboldened by his victories, Dündar declared himself a sultan and minted coins without the mention of an overlord. On the other hand, the Ilkhanid governor of Anatolia, Timurtash led an extensive campaign to restore the Ilkhanid authority over the Turkmen rulers in the western frontier of Anatolia, such as Dündar. Upon the siege of Felekabad, Dündar sought protection under his nephew Mahmud in Antalya. Mahmud did not resist Timurtash and surrendered his uncle to him. Dündar was executed by Timurtash and would be succeeded by his grandson Badr al-Din Hizr.

== Early life and background ==
The Hamidids' eponymous founder, Hamid Beg, and his tribe originally inhabited northern Syria and later migrated to Anatolia. He served under the Sultanate of Rum by giving military training to the ruler Kayqubad I's children and army. In 1240, Kayqubad's successor, Kaykhusraw II, granted Hamid Beg land around Isparta and Burdur as the local frontier commander. The Mongol conquests gradually reached the region, and Kaykhusraw II faced a major defeat by the Mongol Empire at the Battle of Köse Dağ in 1243. With the division of the Mongol Empire, Anatolia came under the influence of the Ilkhanate, which was founded by Hulegu Khan (r. 1256–1265). When Ilkhan Ghazan (r. 1295–1304), dismissed the Sultan of Rum Mesud II (r. 1284–1297, 1303–1308), Hamid took advantage of the political vacuum and declared his independence in the region spanning Isparta, Burdur, Eğridir, Agros, Gönen, Parlais, Keçiborlu, and the fortified town of Uluborlu as his capital. He further expanded his realm to include Yalvaç, Şarkikaraağaç, Avşar, Sütçüler, İncirli, and Ağlasun. It is unclear when Hamid died and whether he was alive in those years, as various sources list his death as the late thirteenth century. After Hamid, Dündar's father Ilyas Beg took over. His donations to an Islamic dignitary, Sheikh Shikem, reveal that he governed from Uluborlu. He presumably died in the early fourteenth century.

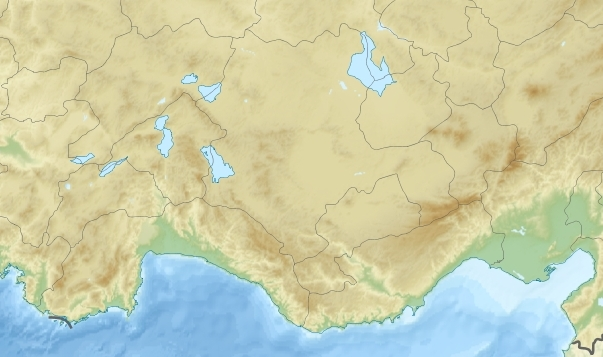
The locations of towns in southwestern Anatolia.

Dündar ruled the vicinity of Burdur for some time during his father's reign. The Grand Mosque of Burdur, located in the neighborhood of Pazar, was built during Dündar's administration and is also known by Dündar's name. The inscriptions on the mosque dated to 1300–1301 refer to him as malik al-umara (king of emirs). In Felekabad (Eğridir), he built a madrasa (school) known as Dündar Bey Madrasa or Taşmedrese, the inscriptions on which (1301–1302) additionally use the title ispahsalar ('senior military commander') for Dündar.

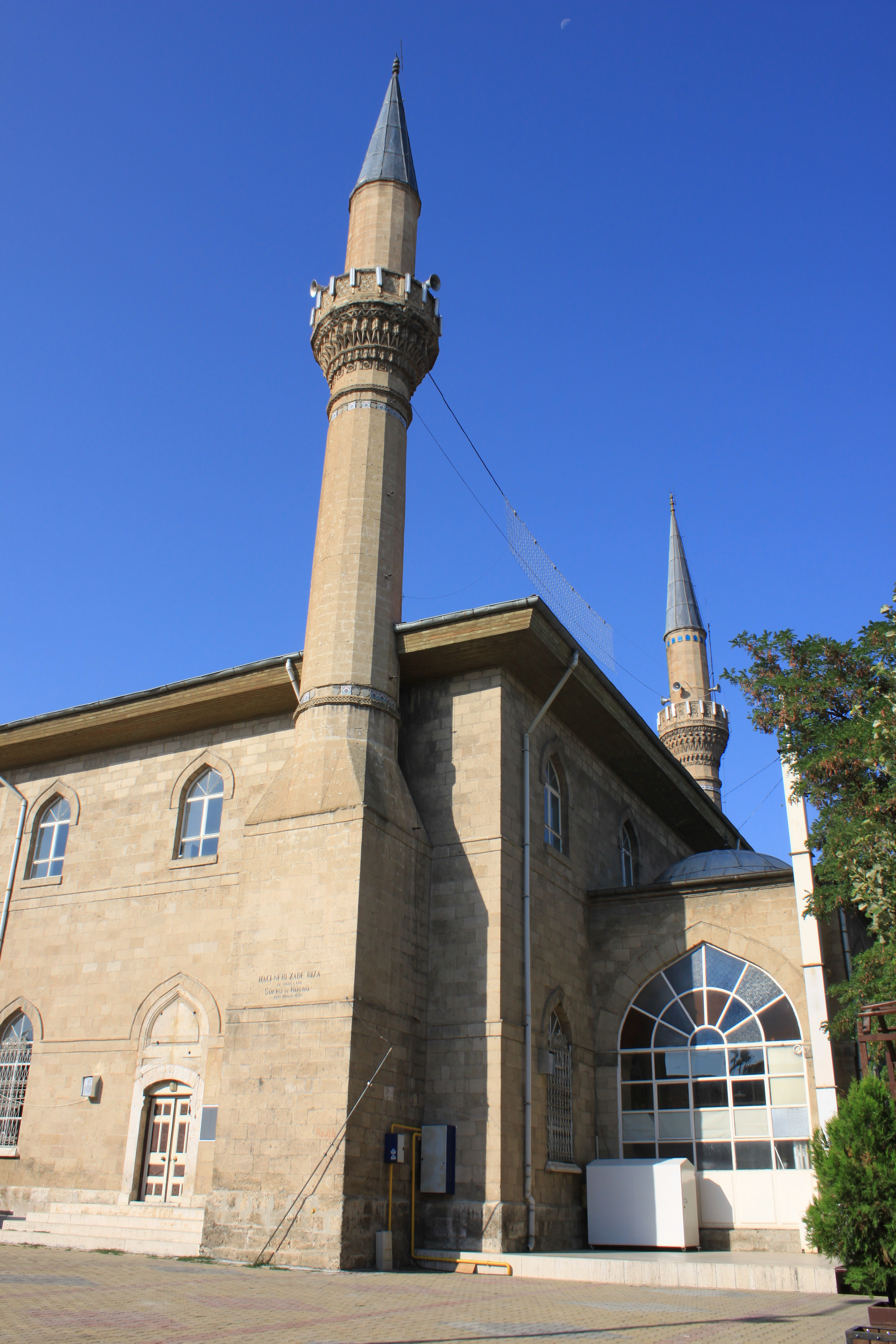
Grand Mosque of Burdur, photographed in 2017.

== Reign ==
Dündar changed the state's capital from Uluborlu to Eğirdir. Uluborlu had lost its strategic importance as much of the frontier region with the Byzantine Empire had come under Muslim control. Eğirdir was easier to defend and was situated on the trade and military routes between the major cities of Antalya and Konya. Dündar commissioned Eğridir's reconstruction from 1301–1302 onwards, including the repair of its citadel and city walls. He renamed the city to Felekabad, deriving from his laqab (honorific name) Felek al-Din (lit. 'the sky of the religion').

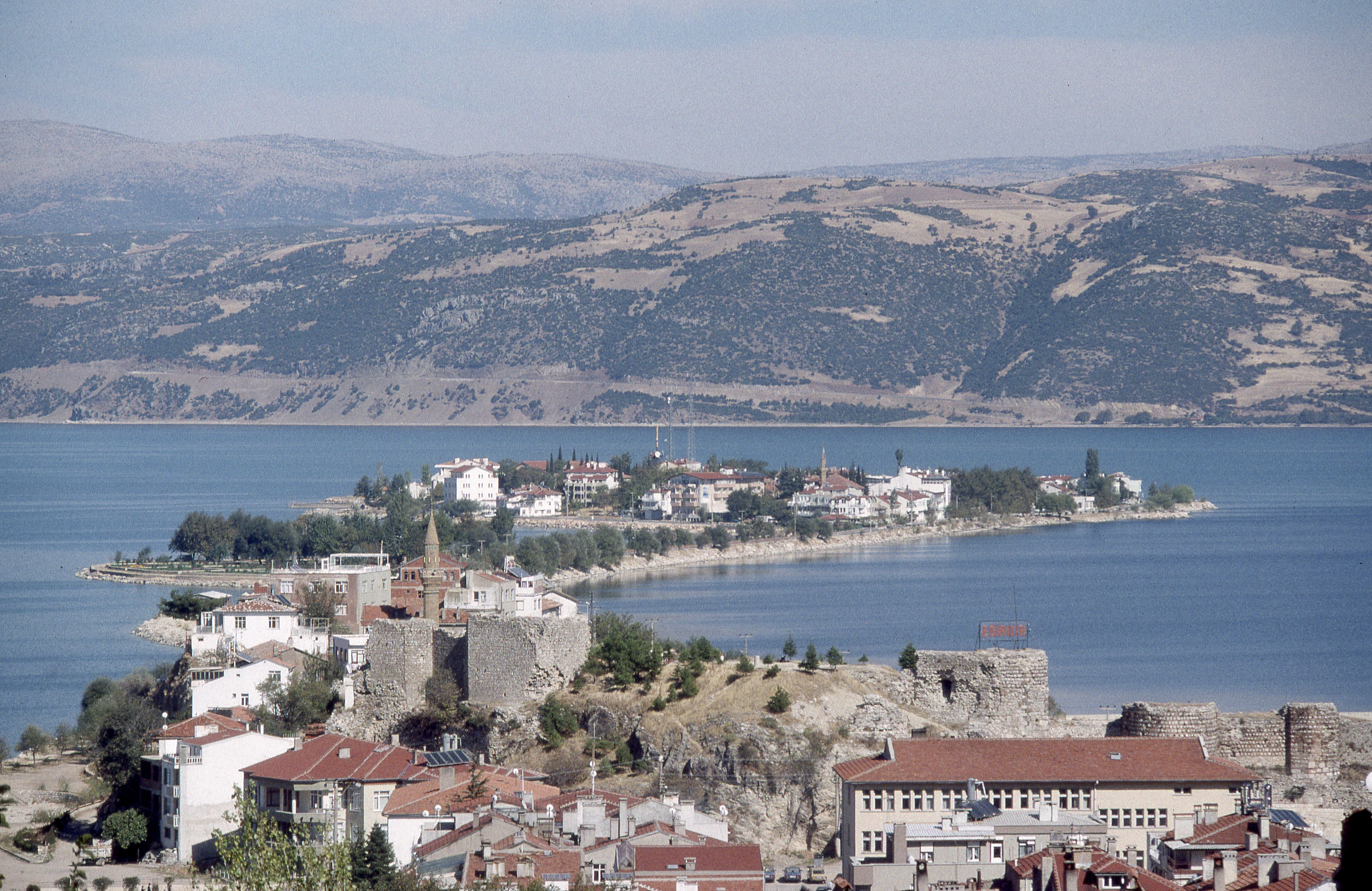
A view of Eğirdir from 2018.

In 1307–1308, Dündar minted silver coins for Öljaitü (r. 1304–1316) as a demonstration for his allegiance to the Ilkhanate. Öljaitü appointed his uncle Irinjin as the governor-general of Anatolia. Taking advantage of Irinjin's poor administration troubled by local revolts, Dündar expanded his borders towards Antalya, Denizli, and Germiyan, promptly seizing Irle, Asi Karaağaç, and Tefenni. On the other hand, he circulated coins in the name of Öljaitü in Burdur and Uluborlu in 1309–1310. When Öljaitü came out unsuccessful in his campaign against the Mamluk Sultanate, who reached Mosul, Dündar further took Gölhisar and Istanoz, reaching the city of Antalya.

Upon the death of Mesud II, the last Sultan of Rum, the Karamanids annexed Konya claiming the legacy of the fallen Seljuk state. Öljaitü sent Chupan as the head of a large army to Anatolia to reestablish Ilkhanid authority over the region. Chupan set his headquarters near Karanbük, between Sivas and Erzincan, where Dündar, like most Turkmen rulers of Anatolia, pledged his loyalty to Chupan with valuable gifts and received a robe of honor. After returning to Felekabad, Dündar issued silver coins for Öljaitü once again in 1314–1315 and started paying an annual tax of 4000 dinars to the Ilkhanate.

The Ilkhanid authority in Anatolia was weakened again soon after Chupan departed from the region and new internal struggles emerged when twelve-year-old Abu Sa'id Bahadur Khan (r. 1316–1335) rose to the throne following his father Öljaitü's demise in December 1316. The Karamanids reconquered Konya, while Dündar took the major Mediterranean port city of Antalya and trusted his brother Yunus and his nephews with its administration, giving rise to the Teke branch of the dynasty. He declared independence by assuming the title sultan. Dündar dropped Abu Sa'id's mention from the coins minted in 1321, until when the coins acknowledged the Ilkhanid overlordship. He became the suzerain of various other local states, namely the Aydinids, Sarukhanids, and Menteshe. Dündar's increase in power is also echoed by the disputed notion that Osman Ghazi, the founder of the future Ottoman Empire, sought protection from Dündar against the Germiyanids. In those times, Dündar ruled over nine cities, apart from Antalya, and fifteen fortresses, with thirty thousand infantry and cavalry under his command.

In 1320, Timurtash, who succeeded his father Chupan as the Anatolian governor-general, restored Ilkhanid rule in Konya in 1320, but two years later, declared sovereignty through the khutbah (sermon) and coins in his name. Threatened by Timurtash, Dündar and Suleiman II of the Eshrefids complained to Chupan and Abu Sa'id, who did not heed their complaint until Timurtash attempted to forge an alliance with the Mamluks. Chupan arrived in Anatolia and negotiated Timurtash out of the insurrection. Timurtash was pardoned by Abu Sa'id.

Having returned to his position as the governor of Anatolia, Timurtash led a campaign to subjugate the Turkmen lords of the western periphery of Anatolia. He gained control of Beyşehir, the capital of the Eshrefids, and killed its ruler Suleiman. Timurtash later laid siege to Felekabad. Dündar fled from the city and took refuge in Antalya, then governed by his nephew Mahmud. Timurtash approached Antalya in pursuit of Dündar. Mahmud was in fear of Timurtash and handed Dündar over to him. Timurtash immediately executed Dündar. While several sources note Dündar's death year as 1324, historian İsmail Hakkı Uzunçarşılı wrote that it was in October 1326, shortly after the death of the Eshrefid ruler Suleiman II. Dündar's burial place is unknown. Modern historian Tahir Erdem identified Dündar's grave with Devren Dede's türbe (tomb), (Note: According to the locals that Erdem interviewed, Devren Dede was the conqueror of Eğridir.) which is located near the entrance of the citadel of Eğridir, relying on the similarity in pronunciation. However, Bahriye Üçok noted the lack of any reliable historical evidence to back up this claim. Sometime after the occupation of the region by Timurtash, Dündar was succeeded by his grandson (Note: Earlier sources identified Hizr as Dündar's son. According to the introductory portions of tafsirs (exegesis) commissioned by Hizr himself, he was the son of Dündar's son Ishak.) Badr al-Din Hizr Beg in 1325 or 1327.

== Bibliography ==
- Akalın Eryavuz, Şebnem (1994). "Dündar Bey Medresesi". TDV Encyclopedia of Islam, Vol. 10 (Dûmetülcendel – Elbi̇se) (in Turkish). Istanbul: Presidency of Religious Affairs, Centre for Islamic Studies. pp. 21–22. ISBN 978-975-389-437-1.
- Bosworth, Clifford Edmund (1996). New Islamic Dynasties: A Chronological and Genealogical Manual. Edinburgh University Press. ISBN 9780231107143. OCLC 35029627.
- de Planhol, Xavier (1971). "Ḥamīd, or Ḥamīd Og̲h̲ullari̊". In Lewis, B.; Ménage, V. L.; Pellat, Ch. & Schacht, J. (eds.). The Encyclopaedia of Islam, Second Edition. Volume III: H–Iram. Leiden: E. J. Brill. OCLC 495469525.
- Jackson, Cailah (4 September 2020). Islamic Manuscripts of Late Medieval Rum, 1270s-1370s Production, Patronage and the Arts of the Book. Edinburgh University Press. ISBN 9781474451512. OCLC 1202462227.
- Kofoğlu, Sait (1995). "Feleküddin Dündar Bey". TDV Encyclopedia of Islam, Vol. 12 (Eys – Fikhü'l-Hadîs) (in Turkish). Istanbul: Presidency of Religious Affairs, Centre for Islamic Studies. pp. 307–309. ISBN 978-975-389-439-5.
- Kofoğlu, Sait (1997). "Hamidoğulları". TDV Encyclopedia of Islam, Vol. 15 (Hades – Hanefî Mehmed) (in Turkish). Istanbul: Presidency of Religious Affairs, Centre for Islamic Studies. pp. 471–476. ISBN 978-975-389-442-5.
- Peacock, Andrew Christian Spencer (2000). "Saljuqs iii. Saljuqs of Rum". In Yarshater, Ehsan (ed.). Encyclopædia Iranica (Online ed.). Encyclopædia Iranica Foundation.
- Üçok, Bahriye (1955). "Hamitoğulları Beyliği". Journal of the Faculty of Divinity of Ankara University (in Turkish). 4 (1–2): 73–80. ISSN 1309-2057.
