= Lake Eğirdir =

Lake in Turkey

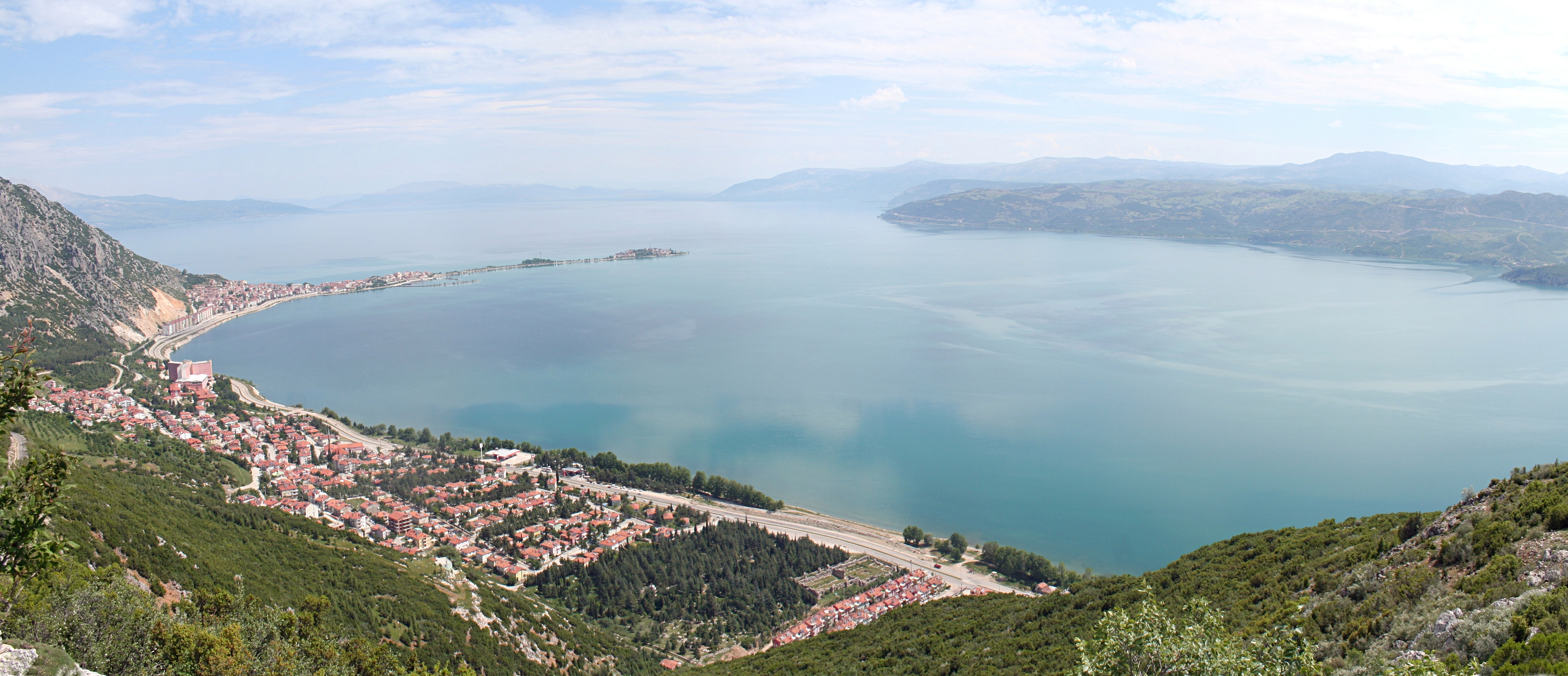
- The lake with the town (on the left) and the two islands with the causeway

- Location within Turkey
- Coordinates: 38°03′24″N 30°51′58″E
- Basin countries: Turkey
- Surface area: 482 km^{2} (186 sq mi)
- Surface elevation: 917 m (3,009 ft)

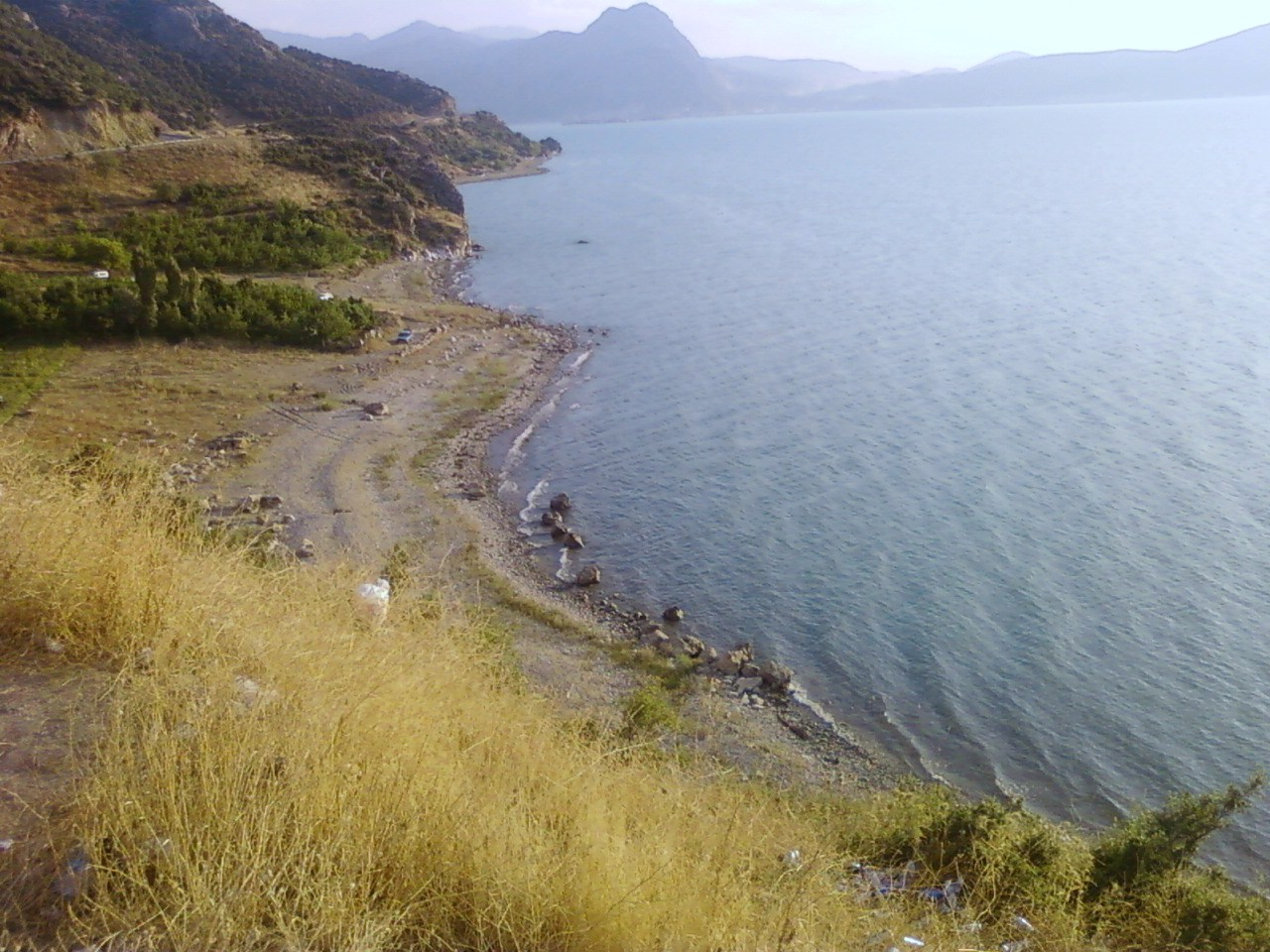
Lake Eğirdir

Eğirdir (Turkish: Eğirdir Gölü, formerly Eğridir) is a lake in the Lakes Region of Turkey. The town of Eğirdir lies near its southern end, 107 kilometers (66 miles) north of Antalya. With an area of 482 square kilometres (186 sq mi) it is the fourth largest lake in Turkey, and the second largest freshwater lake.

== Name ==
The town and the lake were formerly called Eğridir, a Turkish pronunciation of the town's old Greek name Akrotiri. Eğridir means "it is crooked" in Turkish, so to remove the negative connotations, in the mid-1980s the "i" and the "r" were transposed in a new official name, thus creating Eğirdir, a name that evokes spinning and flowers, although many people in Turkey still call both the town and the lake by its former name.

== History ==
Lake Eğirdir must have existed in ancient times, since coins from the nearby city of Parlaos have been found with ships on them, but no clear references to the lake have been found in ancient texts, and its ancient name is unknown. A number of ancient settlements have been located around the lake: places whose names are known were Eğirdir itself (historically known as Akroterion), Parlaos, Malos, and Prostanna; and places whose ancient names are not known were at the ruin sites of Bedre, Ghaziri, and Ertokuş Han, as well as on Yeşil Ada. (Based on its modern name, Bedre – now known as Gökçe – may have been called "Petra" in ancient times.) In the 14th century, Ibn Batutta mentioned merchant shipping on the lake at Eğirdir (or Akrīdūr, as he called the city in Arabic).

== Hydrology ==
Lake Eğirdir is fed by about 40 different springs, some of which are intermittent, and also by rainfall within its 3,309-km^{2} drainage basin. The main streams which feed Lake Eğirdir are the Pupa, the Hoyran, the Yalvaç, and the Çay. Besides evaporation, water exits Lake Eğirdir either by flowing out through the Kovada Canal into Lake Kovada, by draining out into one of the about 20 natural ponors that exist at the bottom of the lake, or by being pumped out through one of the 11 irrigation pumps built around the lake. The average retention time for water in the lake is 2.5 to 3 years.

The lake has an average depth of 7 m and a maximum depth of 13 m. Significant fluctuations in Lake Eğirdir's water level are not uncommon. It has a total volume of 4,000 cubic hectometres (140 billion cubic feet), of which 1,000 cubic hectometres (35 billion cubic feet) is drawn off for irrigation, drinking water, or other human uses. Approximately 45,000 hectares are irrigated by waters drawn from the lake. There is no thermal stratification in the lake.

A strait called the Hoyran Boğazı divides Lake Eğirdir into two parts: the larger Eğirdir Gölü proper and the smaller Hoyran Gölü.

== Islands ==
Lake Eğirdir has two islands, connected to the mainland by a long causeway into the town of Eğirdir:

- Can Ada (meaning "Life Island") the smaller of the two islands.
- Yeşil Ada ("Green Island," formerly known as Nis) - until 1923, was home to a Greek community living in stone and timber houses.

== Wildlife ==
=== Fish ===
Beginning with Karekin Deveciyan's Türkiye'de Balık ve Balıkçılık in 1915, a total of 15 different fish species have been recorded in Lake Eğirdir. Of these, 7 are endemic species that still inhabit the lake, 2 are endemic species that are now locally extinct, 4 are introduced species, 1 is of uncertain origin but is native to the area, and 1 is of unknown status but likely an exotic species. Introduction of invasive species since the 1950s, along with overfishing, has caused significant disruption in the local ecosystem. The first major change came in 1955, when the non-native pike perch, which preys on other fish, was intentionally introduced to the lake. The reason was that the lake's native fish were not very economically valuable for commercial fishing. The population dynamics of the lake's ecosystem "rapidly collapsed", and two endemic species became locally extinct. Since then, other exotic species have been introduced to the lake, such as the omnivorous Prussian carp by 1996 and the plankton- and fish-eating big-scale sand smelt by 2003.

Endemic species:

- Eurasian carp (Cyprinus carpio): its numbers have decreased significantly due to overfishing, habitat loss, and invasive species.
- Eğirdir barb (Capoeta pestai): since 1955, predation from the pike perch drove this fish's numbers to critically endangered status, but in the 2000s it started to reappear in small numbers as pike perch numbers dropped. According to Küçük et al., it survived because "a small creek flowing into the lake forms a shelter and breeding ground".
- Ereğli minnow (Hemigrammocapoeta kemali: According to Küçük et al., this fish's first recording in Lake Eğirdir was in 1950 by Curt Kosswig, who incorrectly identified it as Tylognathus klatti. In any case, it has not been seen since 1958; it was presumably hunted to extinction by the pike perch.
- Kavinne (Pseudophoxinus handlirschi): native to the lake and its basin, it was last fished in 1960. There are no official records, but based on interviews with local fishermen it seems to have gone extinct by the early 1970s. It inhabited the lake's pelagic zone and was formerly a significant source of commercial fishing.
- Eğirdir minnow (Pseudophoxinus egridiri): According to Küçük et al., P. egridiri should be classified as distinct from other Pseudophoxinus species because it has a different number of scales and vertebrae. It developed a different niche than P. handlirschi, and they lived in different habitats. Now, P. egridiri is critically endangered; it mainly exists in the cold-water streams feeding the lake, such as the Karaot region and Yalvaç Creek. Habitat loss and pollution due to drought are major threats to this species.
- Baltic vimba (Vimba vimba): called "asıl akbalık" by Deveciyan in 1915, it has been fished on a modest scale. According to Küçük et al., its numbers declined during the 2000s.
- Taşışıran (Cobitis turcica): Kosswig and Geldiay identified this as Cobitis taenia in 1952, but Küçük et al. argued that it should be identified as C. turcica instead. They reported that they were unable to find this fish in Lake Eğirdir itself, but they did observe some in the Yalvaç Canal right at the point where it meets with the lake.
- Barbatula mediterraneus: originally identified by Kosswig and Geldiay (1952) and Küçük (1998) as Nemacheilus angorae, Küçük et al. more recently said it should be classified as B. mediterraneus instead.
- Killifish (Aphanius anatoliae anatoliae): this fish forms small schools and especially congregates close to shore, where aquatic plants grow densely. A significant increase in the number of killifish in Lake Eğirdir was recorded in the 2000s. Küçük et al. attribute this to the concurrent decrease in the lake's pike perch population, meaning that the killifish faced less predation. It is now one of the most common fish found in the lake.

Introduced species:

- Pike perch (Sander luciopera): a piscivore that was originally introduced to the lake in 1955, when the Istanbul University Hydrobiology Institute imported 10,000 pike perch fry from Austria. It became extremely successful in Lake Eğirdir's ecosystem and was fished commercially from the 1960s until around 2000. Fish processing facilities were established around the lake, and the caught pike perch were filleted and exported to European markets. By the end of the 1980s, predation from the pike perch had driven many of the native fish species to local extinction. Without enough prey fish, the pike perch began turning to cannibalism. Studies in 1992 and 1996 found that most of the pike perch's diet was other pike perch. Part of the reason that more new species were brought to Lake Eğirdir was to provide food for the pike perch. In recent decades, the lake's pike perch population has dramatically decreased and it is now a rare fish. Overfishing, "excessive plant growth", and the introduction of the big-scale sand smelt all contributed to an unfavorable environment for the pike perch.
- Prussian carp (Carassius gibelio): how this fish came to be in the lake is unknown. It may have been inadvertently brought to the lake through attempting to introduce other fish. It was first recorded in 1996. It has managed to find a successful niche in the lake's ecosystem and is now its most common fish. It is an omnivore.
- Big-scale sand smelt (Atherina boyeri): it was probably introduced around 2003 for commercial fishing from another inland water source in Turkey. It is now one of the lake's dominant species. It eats plankton and other fish.
- Mosquitofish (Gambusia affinis): like the Prussian carp, this fish also came to the lake through unknown means. Since the introduction of the big-scale sand smelt in 2003, its numbers have declined due to competition for food resources.

Uncertain origin, possibly or likely exotic:

- Seminemacheilus ispartensis: its type locality is Beşevler Spring, which is 5 km from the lake but not connected to it. It may have been introduced by longline fishing in the early 1990s. Its range now includes Lake Eğirdir as well as several small streams that flow into the lake. It also lives in the Kovada Canal.
- Knipowitschia caucasica: not recorded in studies between 1933 and 1997; its first recording was by Küçük in 1998 in the Çayköy Canal. Its origins are unknown, but Van Neer (1999) theorized that it may have accidentally been introduced when the lake was being stocked with other fish species.

=== Crayfish ===
The narrow-clawed crayfish (Astacus leptodactylus) inhabits Lake Eğirdir and is commercially harvested. It is not native to the lake, but when exactly it was introduced is unknown. From 1970 to 1985, Lake Eğirdir accounted for 75% of Turkey's annual crayfish catch. In 1986, however, the lake's crayfish population "collapsed" due to crayfish plague and crayfish harvesting stopped. Its population later recovered somewhat and commercial harvesting was resumed in 1999; however, catch numbers have never recovered to pre-plague levels (harvests are "1 to 2 orders of magnitude lower than those in the early 1980s". Another outbreak of crayfish plague in the lake in 2004 killed off much of the local population, and commercial harvesting of crayfish in Lake Eğirdir was banned in 2009. The pathogen causing crayfish plague, Aphanomyces astaci, has remained present in the lake, which may have prevented the local crayfish population from fully recovering to previous levels.

== Economy ==
The total economic value of commercial fishing on Lake Eğirdir has ranged between a low of US$50,526 in 2008 and a high of US$3,001,920 in 1977. The most profitable period was the decade from 1975 to 1985, when the annual yield ranged from $2–3 million USD. The most important fish species have historically been the Eurasian carp and the pike perch, while crayfish were the most important species overall between 1975 and 1985. Several native fish species such as V. vimba, C. pestai, and P. handlirschi were never economically significant. Predation and overfishing have threatened the lake's Eurasian carp population, especially since the 2000s, and its annual catch has fallen by 90% from what it was in the 1950s. From 2008 to 2012, commercial fishing of Eurasian carp was banned. Pike perch fishery has also decreased in importance in recent decades as that fish's population has contracted. The crayfish catch also plummeted in the 1980s due to the crayfish plague, and its harvesting was banned from 1986 to 1999 and again from 2008 to 2010. In the 2000s, the introduced Prussian carp became a very successful source of commercial fishing. However, the overall annual yield for the lake's fisheries have continued to decline.

In terms of employment, the number of workers in the lake's fishing industry has increased continuously since 1991, and especially since 2001. The number of households employed in fishing increased from 287 in 1991 to 1,164 in 2009. The amount of fishing boats on the lake was 1,623 in 1984, 115 in 1999, 425 in 2001, and 510 in 2002.

== Water usage ==
About 45,000 hectares of farmland are irrigated using waters from Lake Eğirdir. Water is also extracted for drinking water and electricity generation, although in the 2000s this has decreased relative to the increasing agricultural demand. The lake provides drinking water to the city of Isparta.

== Geology ==
Lake Eğirdir forms part of the Eğirdir-Kovada graben, a north–south depression that also includes Lake Kovada. Two distinct stages of geological deposits are visible on dry land. Deposits from the first stage are exposed above ground in the Yeşilköy area; this is called the Yeşilköy Formation. This may have been deposited by the prehistoric Gölcük Volcano, 50 km to the southwest near the city of Isparta. The second phase is recent alluvial sedimentary deposits from Quaternary times, especially visible in areas around Eğirdir and Barla as well as around Lake Kovada.

This region is very seismically active; for example, in March 2007, a magnitude 5.1 earthquake happened on the lake's eastern shore, along the Esinyurt Fault; it was followed by 93 smaller aftershocks over a period of 4 days.

== See also ==
- List of lakes in Turkey
- Taurus Mountains
