= Hamid Beg =

Founding Bey of Hamid

Hamid
- Sultan (Note: As-Sultan al-Azam, Sultan-i selatin al-Arab wa'l Ajam, and as-Sultan Hamid.); Padishah al-Muazzam

Bey of Hamid
- Successor: Ilyas
- Dynasty: Hamidid
- Religion: Islam

Hamid Beg was the eponymous founder of the Hamidids in southwestern Anatolia. Hamid Beg's tribe originally inhabited northern Syria and later migrated to Anatolia. He served under the Sultanate of Rum by giving military training to the ruler Kayqubad I's children and army. In 1240, Kayqubad's successor, Kaykhusraw II, granted Hamid Beg land around Isparta and Burdur as the local frontier commander. The Mongol conquests gradually reached the region, and Kaykhusraw II faced a major defeat by the Mongol Empire at the Battle of Köse Dağ in 1243. With the division of the Mongol Empire, Anatolia came under the influence of the Ilkhanate, which was founded by Hulegu Khan (r. 1256–65). Hamid Beg, along with various other Turkmen rulers in the western frontier region in Anatolia, rebelled against the Mongol rule in 1290. Hamid attempted to form an independent state around Burdur and Isparta, with the latter as his capital. When the Sultan of Rum, Mesud II (r. 1284–97, 1303–8) was unable to extinguish these revolts, he sought help from Ilkhan Gaykhatu (r. 1291–95), who ransacked and massacred in the region of Beyşehir, ruled by the Eshrefids, as well as Eğridir, Isparta, and partially Burdur. When the next Ilkhan, Ghazan (r. 1295–1304), dismissed Mesud II, Hamid took advantage of the political vacuum and declared his independence in the region spanning Isparta, Burdur, Eğridir, Agros, Gönen, Parlais, Keçiborlu, and the fortified town of Uluborlu as his capital. He further expanded his realm to include Yalvaç, Şarkikaraağaç, Avşar, Sütçüler, İncirli, and Ağlasun.

However, in 1299–1300, Hamid accepted the Ilkhanid authority by minting coins in the name of Ghazan in Uluborlu, Eğirdir, and Burdur. The same year, he minted coins for the Seljuk sultan Kayqubad III (r. 1298–1301). Waqf inscriptions belonging to the Koyungözü Baba Zawiya in the village of Genceli from 1302–3 indicate that he might have been alive in those times and resided in Uluborlu. The same inscriptions referred to him as as-Sultanu'l-a'zam wa padishahu'l-muazzam sultan-ı selatinu'l-Arab wa'l-Ajam as-Sultan Hamid, (Note: lit. 'The great sultan and exalted padishah, the sultan of sultans of Arabia and Persia, Sultan Hamid') which were titles historically reserved for the sultans of Rum. Though, it is unclear when Hamid died and whether he was alive in those years, as various sources list his death as the late thirteenth century. After Hamid, Dündar's father Ilyas Beg took over. His donations to an Islamic dignitary, Sheikh Shikem, reveal that he governed from Uluborlu. He presumably died in the early fourteenth century.

== Bibliography ==
- de Planhol, Xavier (1971). "Ḥamīd, or Ḥamīd Og̲h̲ullari̊". In Lewis, B.; Ménage, V. L.; Pellat, Ch. & Schacht, J. (eds.). The Encyclopaedia of Islam, Second Edition. Volume III: H–Iram. Leiden: E. J. Brill. OCLC 495469525.
- Jackson, Cailah (4 September 2020). Islamic Manuscripts of Late Medieval Rum, 1270s-1370s Production, Patronage and the Arts of the Book. Edinburgh University Press. ISBN 9781474451512. OCLC 1202462227.
- Kofoğlu, Sait (1997). "Hamidoğulları". TDV Encyclopedia of Islam, Vol. 15 (Hades – Hanefî Mehmed) (in Turkish). Istanbul: Presidency of Religious Affairs, Centre for Islamic Studies. pp. 471–476. ISBN 978-975-389-442-5.
- Peacock, Andrew Christian Spencer (2000). "Saljuqs iii. Saljuqs of Rum". In Yarshater, Ehsan (ed.). Encyclopædia Iranica (Online ed.). Encyclopædia Iranica Foundation.
