= Sanjak of Hamid =

Administrative division of the Ottoman Empire

Coordinates: 37.76°N 30.55°E

The Sanjak of Hamid (also Hamideli) was a second-level province (sanjak) of the Ottoman Empire.

The sanjak comprised the region around the town of Isparta, which was ruled by the Hamidids, an autonomous Turkish dynasty that submitted to the Ottomans in 1390 or 1391/92. It became part of the Anatolia Eyalet, but was lost after the Battle of Ankara (1402) and not re-incorporated into the Ottoman state until 1423. After the Anatolia Eyalet was dissolved ca. 1841, it became part of the Karaman Eyalet. It was renamed after its capital as the Sanjak of Isparta in 1880, and again as the Sanjak of Hamidabad in 1891.

In the 16th-century, the Sanjak of Hamid was comprised by the kazas of Isparta, Ağlasun, Afşar, Burdur, Eğirdür, Gölhisar, Gönen, İrle, Karaağaç-ı Gölhisar, Keçiborlu, Uluborlu and Yalvaç.

In 1912 it comprised the districts (kazas) of Isparta proper, Uluborlu, Egridir, Karaağaç, and Yalvaç.

== Sources ==
- Birken, Andreas [in German] (1976). Die Provinzen des Osmanischen Reiches [The Provinces of the Ottoman Empire]. Beihefte zum Tübinger Atlas des Vorderen Orients, 13 (in German). Reichert. ISBN 3-920153-56-1.
