= Eğirdir Castle =

Castle in Isparta Province, Turkey

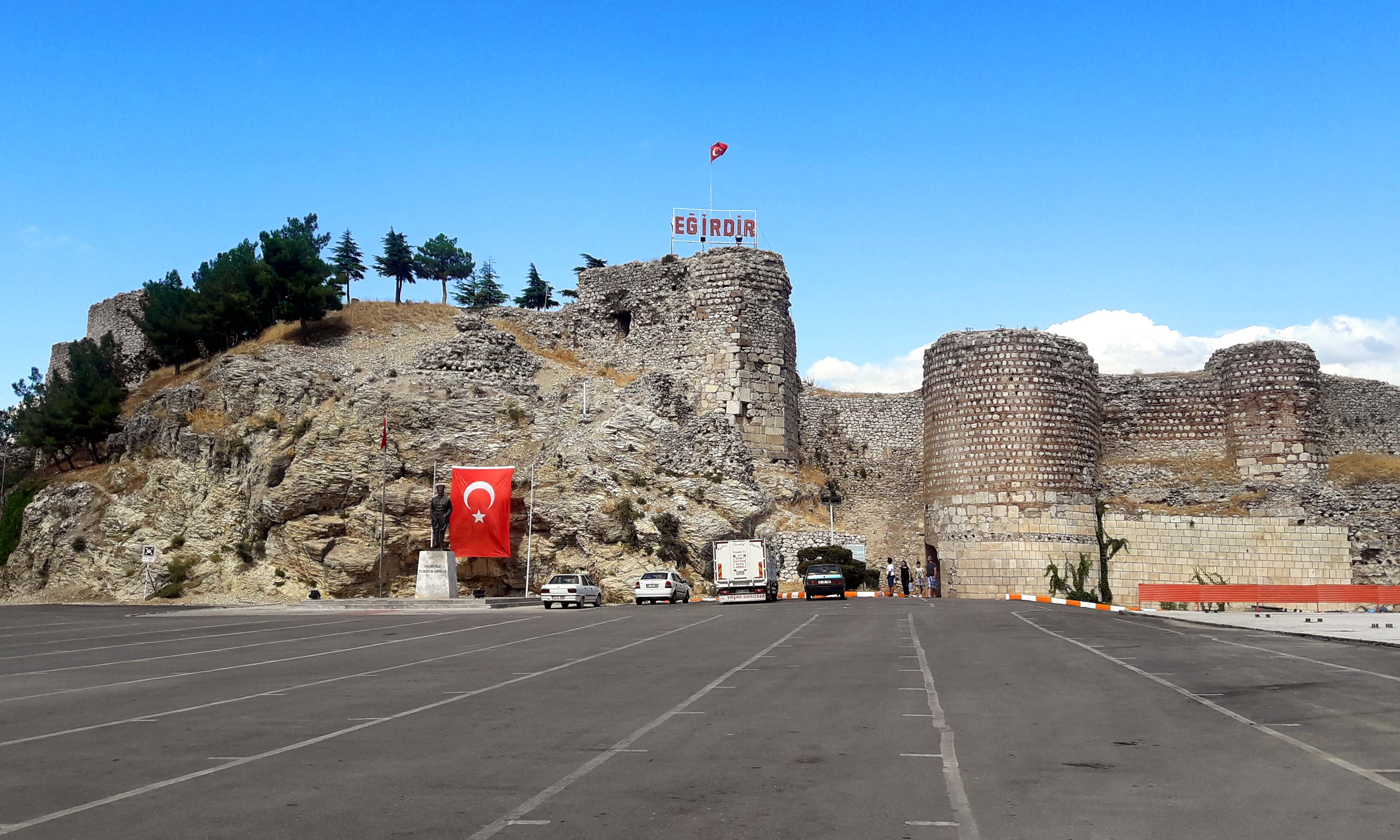
Eğirdir Castle

Eğirdir Castle is a castle in Turkey.

It is in Eğirdir ilçe (district) of Isparta Province. Located at 37°52′33″N 30°51′11″E is on an isthmus of Eğirdir Lake.

There is no written account of the construction date of the castle. According to local tradition it may be as old as the Lydian Kingdom (BC 6-7 centuries) But judging from the masonry it was constructed or reconstructed during the Roman Empire or the Byzantine Empire eras. In the early 14th century Eğirdir was the capital of the Anatolian beylik of Hamidids. According to the inscription of the castle, it was restored by Dündar of Hamidoğlu in 1307. However, during the campaign of Timur in 1402, it was partially ruined. During the Ottoman Empire era the castle was a small military post.

The castle was primarily built against the attacks from the lake and it is only about 15 metres (49 ft) high. Because of the urban settlement on the ruins, the size of the original castle is not known But the area of the inner castle is about 4,500 square metres (48,000 sq ft).
