= Mubariz al-Din Ishak =

Beg of Hamid from 1328 to 1335

Beg of Hamid
- Reign: 1328 – before 1335
- Predecessor: Khidr
- Successor: Muzaffar al-Din Mustafa
- Died: Before 1335
- Dynasty: Hamidid
- Father: Felek al-Din Dündar
- Religion: Islam

Mubariz al-Din Ishak was Beg of Hamid from 1328 until before 1335.

== Bibliography ==
- Bosworth, Clifford Edmund (1996). New Islamic Dynasties: A Chronological and Genealogical Manual. Edinburgh University Press. ISBN 9780231107143. OCLC 35029627.
- de Planhol, Xavier (1971). "Ḥamīd, or Ḥamīd Og̲h̲ullari̊". In Lewis, B.; Ménage, V. L.; Pellat, Ch. & Schacht, J. (eds.). The Encyclopaedia of Islam, Second Edition. Volume III: H–Iram. Leiden: E. J. Brill. OCLC 495469525.
- Jackson, Cailah (4 September 2020). Islamic Manuscripts of Late Medieval Rum, 1270s-1370s Production, Patronage and the Arts of the Book. Edinburgh University Press. ISBN 9781474451512. OCLC 1202462227.
- Kofoğlu, Sait (1995). "Feleküddin Dündar Bey". TDV Encyclopedia of Islam, Vol. 12 (Eys – Fikhü'l-Hadîs) (in Turkish). Istanbul: Presidency of Religious Affairs, Centre for Islamic Studies. pp. 307–309. ISBN 978-975-389-439-5.
- Kofoğlu, Sait (1997). "Hamidoğulları". TDV Encyclopedia of Islam, Vol. 15 (Hades – Hanefî Mehmed) (in Turkish). Istanbul: Presidency of Religious Affairs, Centre for Islamic Studies. pp. 471–476. ISBN 978-975-389-442-5.
- Peacock, Andrew Christian Spencer (2000). "Saljuqs iii. Saljuqs of Rum". In Yarshater, Ehsan (ed.). Encyclopædia Iranica (Online ed.). Encyclopædia Iranica Foundation.
- Üçok, Bahriye (1955). "Hamitoğulları Beyliği". Journal of the Faculty of Divinity of Ankara University (in Turkish). 4 (1–2): 73–80. ISSN 1309-2057.
