= Beylik of Teke =

Former country

- 1321–1423
- Map of the Anatolian beyliks around 1330
- Capital: Antalya
- Common languages: Old Anatolian Turkish
- Religion: Sunni Islam
- Government: Monarchy
- Bey
  - 1321–?: Yunus Bey
  - ?–1391 and 1402–1423: Osman Çelebi
- Historical era: Late Medieval
  - Established: 1321
  - Disestablished: 1423
Preceded by	Succeeded by
Sultanate of Rum	Ottoman Empire

The Anatolian beylik of Teke (Turkish: Tekeoğulları Beyliği), was one of the frontier principalities established by Oghuz Turkish clans after the decline of the Seljuk Sultanate of Rûm. Its capital was Antalya, on the southern coast of modern Turkey. The beylik was established by a branch of the Hamidid dynasty in 1321 and lasted until 1423, when it was permanently annexed by the Ottoman Empire.

== History ==
The Teke dynasty started with a split of territories between two brothers of the neighboring Beylik of the Hamidid dynasty. One brother, Yunus Bey, became the first ruler of the Teke beylik. The inhabitants spoke Anatolian Turkish.

During the reign of the last ruler, Othman, the Ottoman Empire annexed the beylik in 1391. However, during his invasion of Anatolia in 1402, Timur restored Othman to his rule. In 1423, the Ottomans definitively re-annexed the beylik.

== Legacy ==
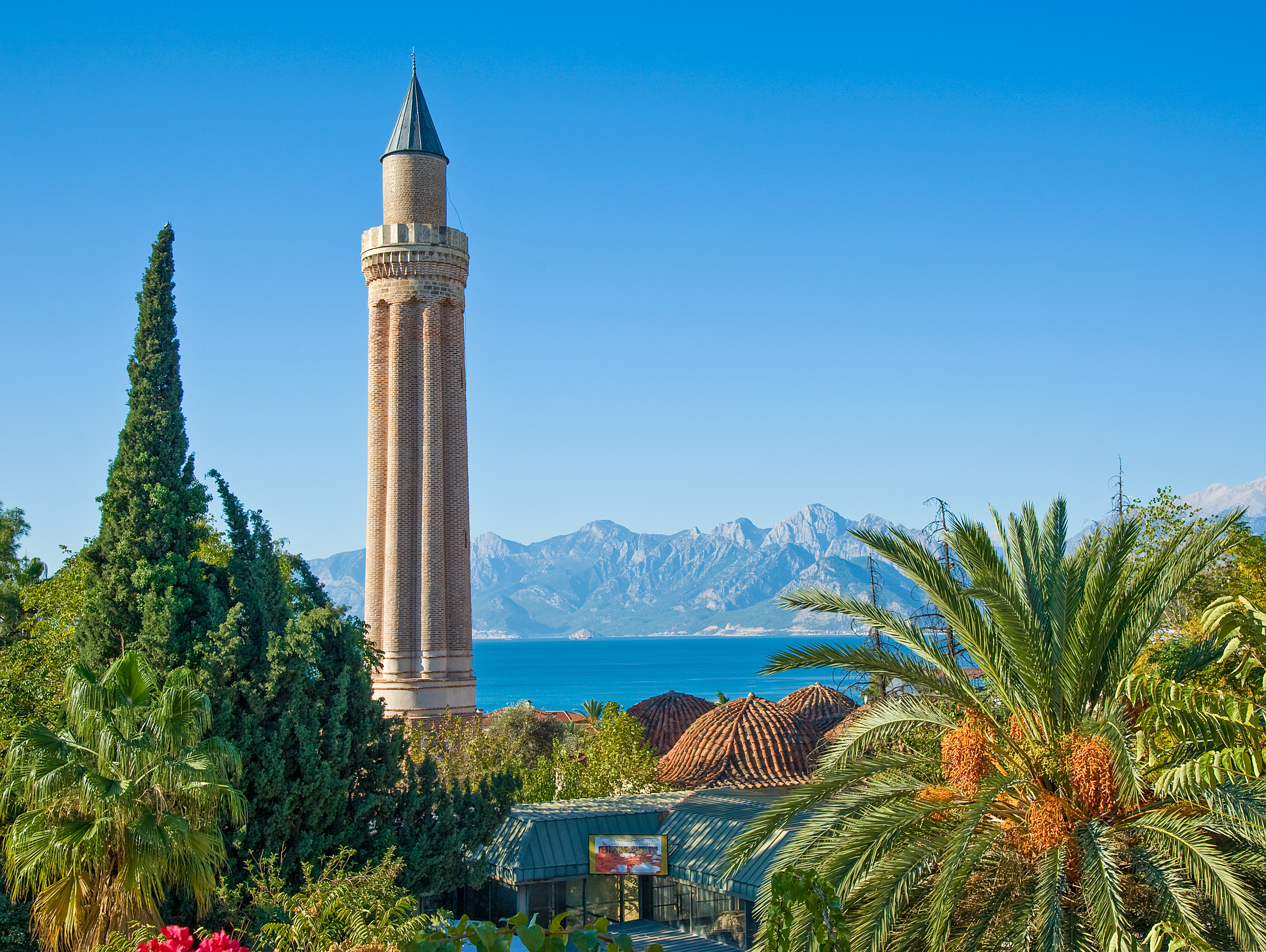
Yivli Minare Mosque, a symbol of Antalya, built by the Beylik of Teke c. 1375

The Turkish province of Antalya was named the sub-province (sanjak) of Teke until the early years of the Republic of Turkey. The peninsula west of Antalya is called Teke Peninsula.

== List of rulers ==
Bey	Reign	Notes
Yunus ibn Ilyas ibn Hamid (or Yunus Bey)	1321–?	Brother of Felek al-Din Dündar, founder of the Hamidid Beylik.
Mahmud ibn Yunus	?–1324	
Khidr ibn Yunus (Sinan al-Din)	1327–?	End date of reign uncertain. Also known as Hızır Bey in Turkish.
Dadı Bey	?–c. 1372	
Muhammad ibn Muhammad (Mubariz al-Din)	c. 1372–c. 1378	Dates of reign uncertain, died after 1378.
Othman Chelebi ibn Muhammad	?–1391; 1402–1423	First reign interrupted by Ottoman annexation in 1391, second reign when restored by Timur in 1402, before final conquest by Ottomans in 1423.

== See also ==
- Yivli Minare Mosque
- List of Sunni Muslim dynasties
- Dündar of Hamidoğlu
