= Seminemacheilus lendlii =

Anatolian loach

Conservation status
- Vulnerable (IUCN 3.1)

Scientific classification
- Kingdom: Animalia
- Phylum: Chordata
- Class: Actinopterygii
- Order: Cypriniformes
- Family: Nemacheilidae
- Genus: Seminemacheilus
- Species: S. lendlii

Binomial name
- Seminemacheilus lendlii (Hankó, 1925)

Synonyms
- Nemacheilus lendli Hankó, 1924

Species of fish

Seminemacheilus lendlii, the Anatolian loach or Northern pond loach, is a species of stone loach endemic to Turkey. This species reaches a length of 9 centimetres (3.5 in) TL. It was formerly widely distributed across Central Anatolia but it is now restricted to springs and tributaries in the basins of Lake Tuz and Lake Beyşehir. It can be found in marshes, lakes, springs and streams with densely vegetated standing water.
