= Capoeta pestai =

Conservation status
- Critically Endangered (IUCN 3.1)

Scientific classification
- Kingdom: Animalia
- Phylum: Chordata
- Class: Actinopterygii
- Order: Cypriniformes
- Family: Cyprinidae
- Subfamily: Barbinae
- Genus: Capoeta
- Species: C. pestai

Binomial name
- Capoeta pestai (Pietschmann, 1933)

Synonyms
- Varicorhinus pestai Pietschmann, 1933; Schizothorax prophylax Pietschmann, 1933

Species of freshwaster fish

Capoeta pestai, called the Eğirdir longsnout scraper or the Eğirdir barb, is a critically endangered freshwater fish species in the family Cyprinidae, found only in Turkey. It used to be common across Lake Eğirdir in central Anatolia, but survives only in one of the inflowing rivers. It was forced out of Lake Eğirdir by a combination of overfishing, irrigation, destruction of its habitat, and the induction of predatory alien fish species.
