= Badr al-Din Hizr =

Beg of Hamid from 1326 to 1328 and c. 1335 to 1358

Badr al-Din Hizr was Bey of Hamid from 1326 to 1328 and c. 1335 to 1358.

== Bibliography ==
- Jackson, Cailah (4 September 2020). Islamic Manuscripts of Late Medieval Rum, 1270s-1370s Production, Patronage and the Arts of the Book. Edinburgh University Press. ISBN 9781474451512. OCLC 1202462227.
- Kofoğlu, Sait (1997). "Hamidoğulları". TDV Encyclopedia of Islam, Vol. 15 (Hades – Hanefî Mehmed) (in Turkish). Istanbul: Presidency of Religious Affairs, Centre for Islamic Studies. pp. 471–476. ISBN 978-975-389-442-5.
