= Burdur =

- Municipality
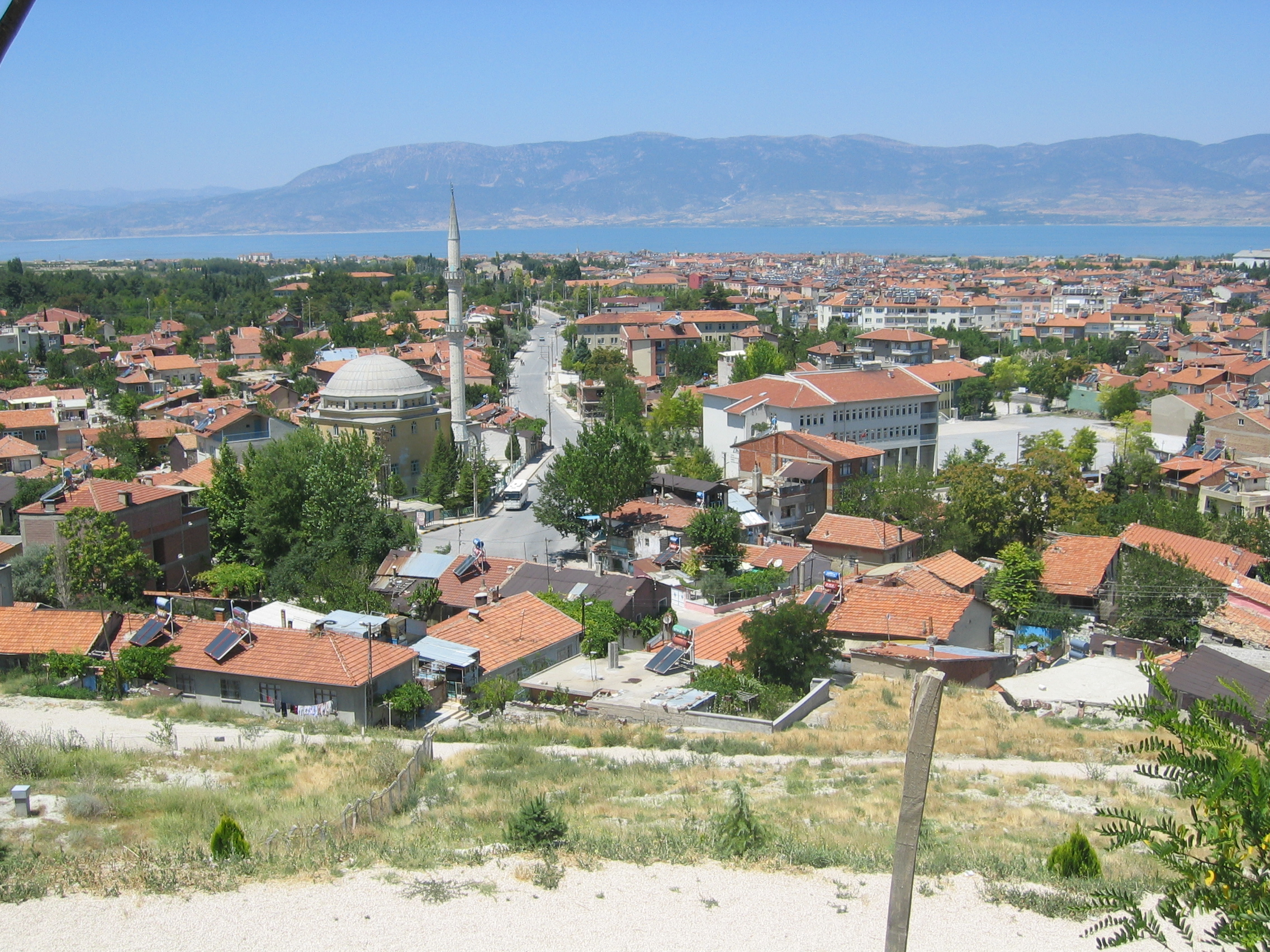
- View of Burdur with Lake Burdur in the background

- Location within Turkey
- Coordinates: 37°43′10″N 30°17′00″E
- Country: Turkey
- Province: Burdur
- District: Burdur

Government
  - Mayor: Ali Orkun Ercengiz (CHP)
- Population (2021): 95,436
- Time zone: UTC+3 (TRT)
- Postal code: 15000
- Area code: 0248
- Website: www.burdur.bel.tr

Burdur is a city in southwestern Turkey. The seat of Burdur Province and of Burdur District, it is located on the shore of Lake Burdur. Its population is 95,436 (2021).

== History ==
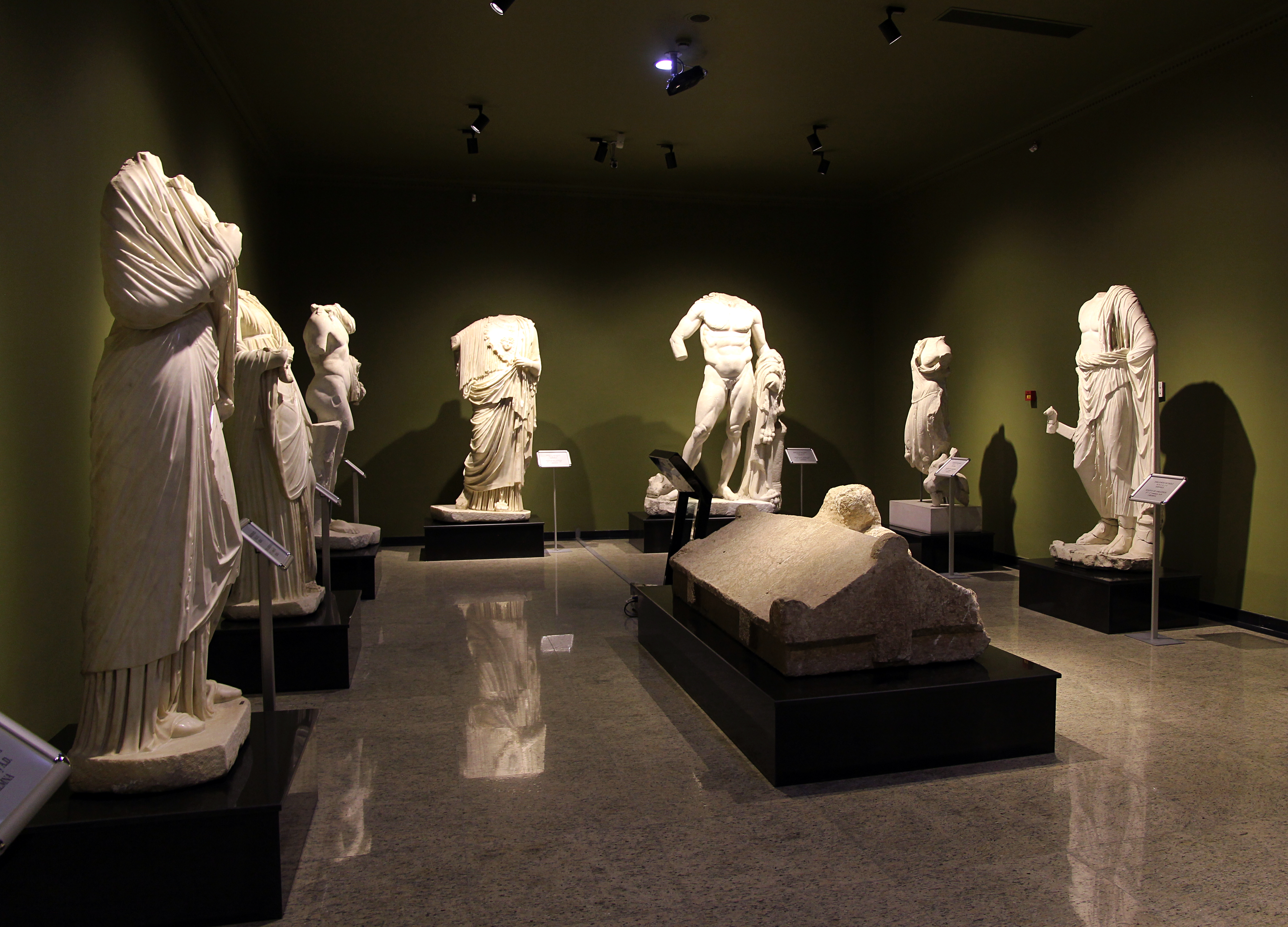
Artifacts in Burdur Archaeological Museum

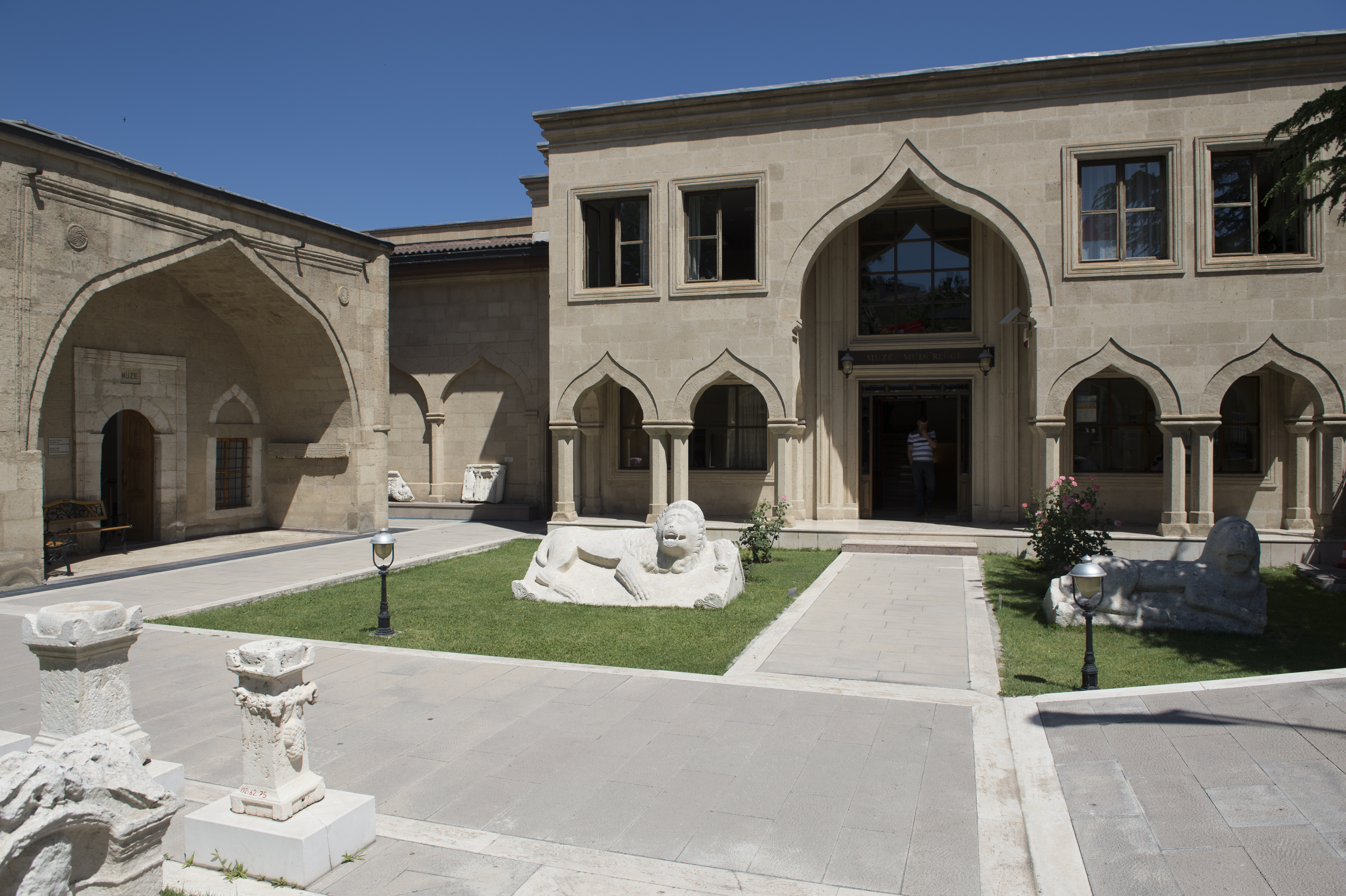
Burdur Archaeological Museum

=== Ancient history ===
Whilst there is evidence of habitation in the province dating back to 6500 BC, the earliest sign of habitation in the city itself dates to Early Bronze Age. Artifacts from this period have been found in the site of today's railway station. In antiquity, the area was part of the region of Pisidia. It has been proposed that the city of Burdur has changed location a number of times; the ancient city of Limnombria ("Lake City") was closer to Lake Burdur than the modern city. It is known that in the Byzantine era, the city existed with the name Polydorion (Greek: Πολυδώριον), from which the current name is derived. No remains of Polydorion survive to this day. Burdur may also occupy the site of a town called Praetoria.

=== Turkish settlement and the Hamidids ===
The history of the urban development of Burdur is generally held to begin with the Turkish settlement after the Seljuq victory at the Battle of Manzikert in 1071. In the late 11th century, the Kınalı tribe of the Oghuz Turks captured the Burdur area and settled there. Turks became the majority of the population of the area after 1211, establishing a number of villages in addition to expanding the town. The first Turkish settlement was in an area known as Hamam Bendi that had a lower elevation than today's city but was farther to the lake than the ancient town of Limnombria. These residents used the site of today's Grand Mosque of Burdur as an open marketplace, known as Alanpazarı. Realising the high incidence of malaria in the area they had settled, these residents then moved uphill, away from the lake. These first residents had not submitted to any state, but Kilij Arslan II, the Seljuq Sultan of Rum, captured the area in 1177 and imposed his sovereignty over the local tribes. The town remained under the undisputed sovereignty of the Sultanate of Rum between 1206 and 1260, when it was captured by the Mongol Empire. Developing commerce in the port of Antalya increased the significance of Burdur as a centre of commerce. Tragacanth obtained from the mountains of Psidia, wine from Kütahya, wax, wood and tar from many parts of Anatolia passed through Burdur, in exchange of which Egyptian spices, cotton and sugar was traded.

In 1300, the Hamidids under Dündar Bey captured Burdur. Dündar Bey had the Grand Mosque of Burdur built around a hilly area in 1300, and the town subsequently developed around the mosque. The Hamidids administered Burdur as a district under the town of Eğirdir. The Ilkhanate then captured Burdur in 1324 under the governor of Anatolia, Timurtash. Dündar Bey's son, İshak Çelebi, recaptured Burdur in 1328. Traveller Ibn Battuta visited the town in 1330. In the account of his visit, he described Burdur as a town blessed with natural beauty and a number of orchards and farms, centred around the Burdur Castle near the Grand Mosque. No trace of the castle remains today except for the names of some of the streets, indicating that with the lack of a strategic requirement for a castle, it was gradually destroyed. The account also indicates the presence of a guild of ahis controlling commerce and production. By comparing the description of Burdur with the presentation of other cities such as Eğirdir, Isparta and Denizli, it can be deduced that Burdur was a relatively minor urban centre with limited commerce. It was, nevertheless, still a stop on the trade route between Konya, the cities of the Black Sea and the ports of the Aegean Sea.

Burdur was captured by the Ottoman Empire in 1391, when Bayezid I conquered the Hamidids. It was initially a district centre and a small town under the Sanjak of Hamid. As of 1478, Burdur had four quarters, three being Muslim and one being Christian. The largest of these was the Cami ("Mosque") quarter of the Muslims.

There was a small Greek population living in the city until the Population exchange between Greece and Turkey. An abandoned Greek church in the city has been turned into a museum with a giant dinosaur fossil a few years ago.

== Climate ==
Burdur has a hot summer mediterranean climate (Köppen climate classification: Csa) or a temperate oceanic climate (Trewartha climate classification: Do). It has chilly, wet and often snowy winters and hot, long and dry summers.

Climate data for Burdur (1991–2020, extremes 1932–2023)
Month	Jan	Feb	Mar	Apr	May	Jun	Jul	Aug	Sep	Oct	Nov	Dec	Year
Record high °C (°F)	16.8 (62.2)	23.4 (74.1)	27.8 (82.0)	30.7 (87.3)	35.4 (95.7)	38.7 (101.7)	41.0 (105.8)	41.6 (106.9)	39.0 (102.2)	33.6 (92.5)	26.5 (79.7)	20.5 (68.9)	41.6 (106.9)
Mean daily maximum °C (°F)	7.1 (44.8)	9.4 (48.9)	13.6 (56.5)	18.2 (64.8)	23.7 (74.7)	29.0 (84.2)	33.0 (91.4)	33.1 (91.6)	28.6 (83.5)	22.2 (72.0)	14.8 (58.6)	8.6 (47.5)	20.1 (68.2)
Daily mean °C (°F)	2.5 (36.5)	4.0 (39.2)	7.4 (45.3)	11.7 (53.1)	16.7 (62.1)	21.5 (70.7)	25.2 (77.4)	25.1 (77.2)	20.5 (68.9)	14.8 (58.6)	8.5 (47.3)	4.1 (39.4)	13.5 (56.3)
Mean daily minimum °C (°F)	−1.0 (30.2)	−0.2 (31.6)	2.3 (36.1)	6.1 (43.0)	10.4 (50.7)	14.3 (57.7)	17.6 (63.7)	17.6 (63.7)	13.2 (55.8)	8.6 (47.5)	3.5 (38.3)	0.6 (33.1)	7.7 (45.9)
Record low °C (°F)	−16.7 (1.9)	−15.0 (5.0)	−11.6 (11.1)	−7.0 (19.4)	−0.4 (31.3)	3.8 (38.8)	9.0 (48.2)	8.8 (47.8)	3.4 (38.1)	−2.4 (27.7)	−12.0 (10.4)	−15.3 (4.5)	−16.7 (1.9)
Average precipitation mm (inches)	48.0 (1.89)	35.1 (1.38)	46.9 (1.85)	49.1 (1.93)	49.3 (1.94)	29.9 (1.18)	18.8 (0.74)	12.8 (0.50)	17.1 (0.67)	32.7 (1.29)	36.8 (1.45)	55.8 (2.20)	432.3 (17.02)
Average precipitation days	10.43	9.50	10.20	10.87	11.20	7.27	3.63	3.50	4.00	6.67	6.80	10.43	94.5
Average snowy days	4.14	2.71	2.14	0.14	0	0	0	0	0	0	0.29	1.64	11.06
Average relative humidity (%)	72.9	67.6	61.4	58.2	56.2	49.9	42.6	43.4	48.1	57.9	65.3	74	58.1
Mean monthly sunshine hours	115.0	142.9	181.2	214.4	272.2	319.3	356.6	336.3	269.9	222.0	166.7	103.2	2,699.5
Mean daily sunshine hours	3.7	5.1	5.9	7.2	8.8	10.6	11.5	10.8	9.0	7.2	5.6	3.3	7.4
Source 1: Turkish State Meteorological Service (extremes)
Source 2: NOAA(humidity, sun 1991-2020), Meteomanz(snow days 2010-2023)

== Education ==
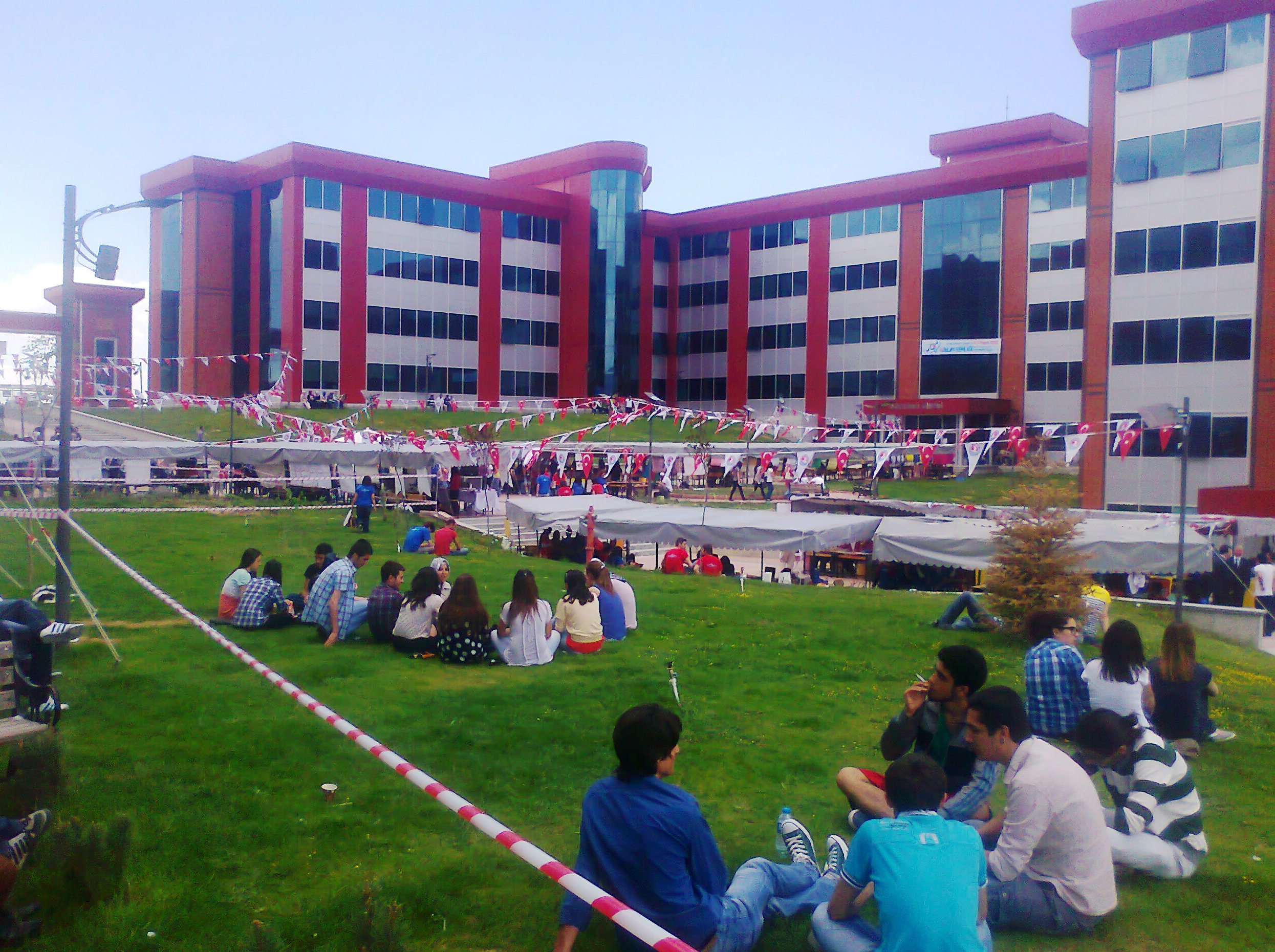
Mehmet Akif Ersoy University campus

Mehmet Akif Ersoy University is located in Burdur.

== Notable residents ==
- Burdurlu Dervish Mehmed Pasha Ottoman Grand Vizier 1818-1820
- Burdurlu Ahmet Şükrü Pasha Ottoman Military Doctor, with major improvements in medical awards
