= Prostanna =

Town of ancient Pisidia

Coordinates: 37°52′27″N 30°50′57″E

Prostanna (Ancient Greek: Προστανά, romanized: Prostaná) was a town of ancient Pisidia or of Lycaonia inhabited during Hellenistic, Roman, and Byzantine times. It was a bishopric; no longer the seat of a residential bishop, it remains a titular see of the Roman Catholic Church.

Its only mention in Byzantine times is at the First Council of Constantinople in 381, when a bishop Attalos of Prostana was mentioned as being present.

Its site is located on the south face of Eğirdirsivrisi mountain, 4 km southwest of Eğirdir in Asiatic Turkey. Here, the remains of an almost circular walled acropolis have been identified, with remains of ancient temples and public buildings along with 4 inscriptions. The boundary of Prostanna's territory with nearby Parlais to the north was at Bedre, where a border stone mentioning the two towns was uncovered in 1948.
