= Eğirdir minnow =

Conservation status
- Extinct (IUCN 3.1)

Scientific classification
- Kingdom: Animalia
- Phylum: Chordata
- Class: Actinopterygii
- Order: Cypriniformes
- Family: Leuciscidae
- Genus: Pseudophoxinus
- Species: †P. handlirschi

Binomial name
- †Pseudophoxinus handlirschi (Pietschmann, 1933)

Synonyms
- Oreoleuciscus handlirschi (Pietschmann, 1933); Phoxinellus handlirschi (Pietschmann, 1933)

Species of fish

The Eğirdir minnow or Handlirsch's minnow (Pseudophoxinus handlirschi) (in Turkish ciçek), is an extinct species of freshwater ray-finned fish belonging to the family Leuciscidae. It was endemic to Lake Eğirdir in Turkey. It was earlier critically endangered due to predation by pike perch which had been introduced to the lake, but has not been found since 1980s and was therefore evaluated by IUCN as extinct in 2013.

== Etymology ==
The fish is named in honor of Austrian entomologist Anton Handlirsch (1865–1935), who was Pietschmann's colleague at the Naturhistorisches Museum in Vienna.
