= Burdur Archaeological Museum =

Museum in Turkey

Coordinates: 37.7195°N 30.2860°E

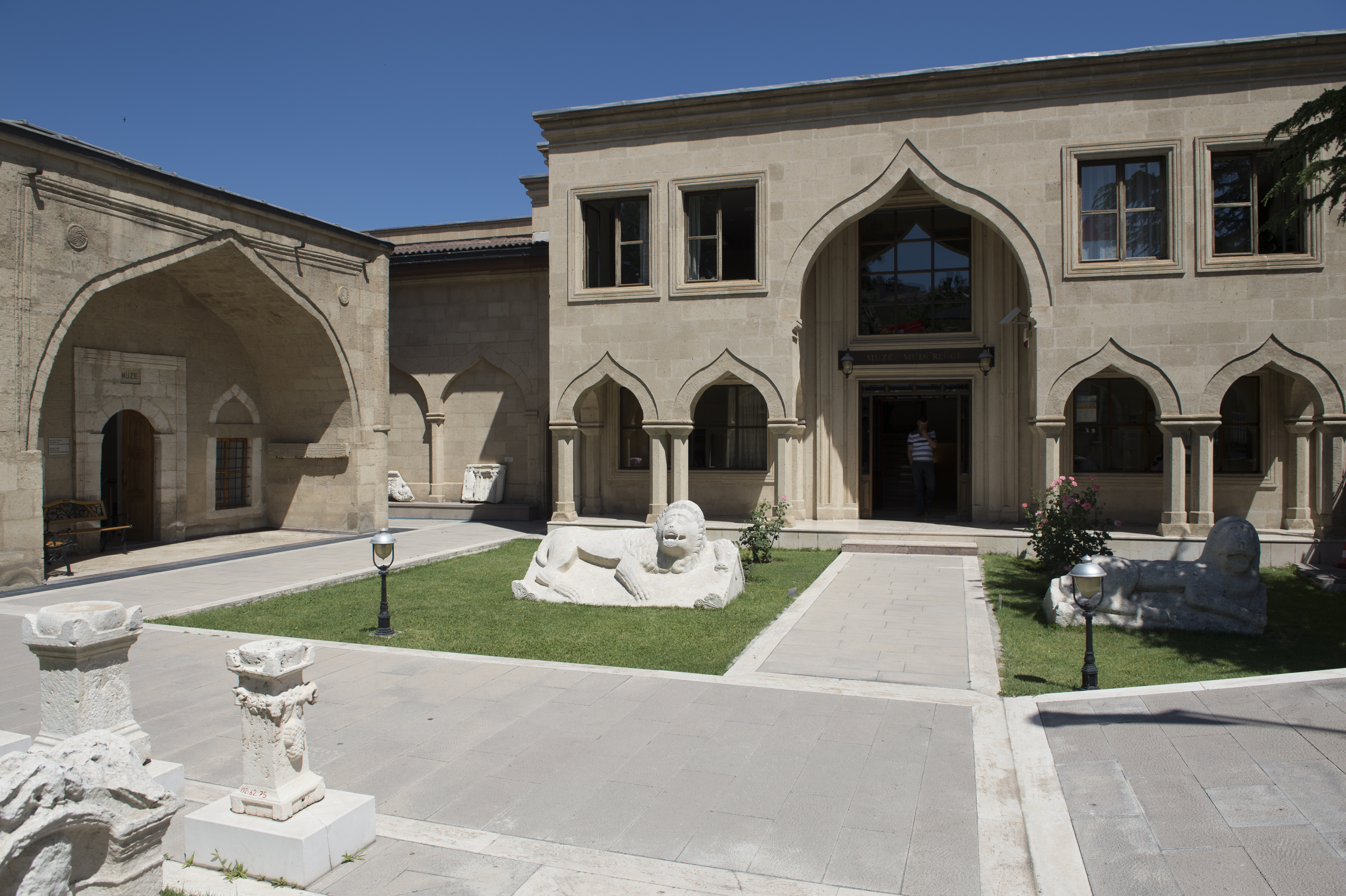
Burdur Archaeological Museum

Burdur Archaeological Museum is an archaeological museum in Burdur, Turkey. The museum, formally established in 1969, had a collection of 52,941 objects as of 1997. It is divided into three main areas: the Garden, the Statue Hall, and the Small Monuments Hall.
