= Seminemacheilus =

Scientific classification
- Kingdom: Animalia
- Phylum: Chordata
- Class: Actinopterygii
- Order: Cypriniformes
- Family: Nemacheilidae
- Genus: Seminemacheilus; Bănărescu & Nalbant, 1995

Type species
- Nemachilus lendlii Hankó, 1924

Genus of fishes

Seminemacheilus is a genus of stone loaches native to western Asia with species known from Turkey and Iran.

== Species ==
These are the currently recognized species in this genus:

- Seminemacheilus ahmeti Sungur, Jalili, Eagderi & Çiçek, 2018
- Seminemacheilus attalicus Yoğurtçuoğlu, Kaya, Geiger & Freyhof, 2020
- Seminemacheilus dursunavsari Çiçek, 2020
- Seminemacheilus ekmekciae Yoğurtçuoğlu, Kaya, Geiger & Freyhof, 2020
- Seminemacheilus ispartensis Erk'akan, Nalbant & Özeren, 2007
- Seminemacheilus lendlii (Hankó, 1925)
