= Mubariz =

Mubariz is a given name. Notable people with the name include:

- Mübariz Alizade (1911–1994), Iranian activist
- Mubariz Gurbanli, Azerbaijani politician
- Mubariz Ibrahimov (1988–2010), Azerbaijani soldier
- Mubariz al-Din Isfendiyar (1360–1440), Candarid monarch
- Mubariz Khan, Mughal governor
- Mubariz Khan (Bengal), Mughal commander
- Mübariz Mansimov, (born 1968), Azerbaijani businessperson
