= Malus (Phrygia) =

Ancient town of Phrygia

Coordinates: 39°05′21″N 30°45′13″E

Malus or Malos (Ancient Greek: Μάλος) was a town of ancient Phrygia, inhabited during Roman and Byzantine times.

Its site is located near Gökçeyayla, in Asiatic Turkey.
