= Parlais =

Ancient city in Anatolia

Coordinates: 38°01′00″N 30°47′00″E

- Location within Turkey
- Type: Settlement
- Cultures: Roman
- Location: Isparta, Turkey
- Region: Pisidia

History
- Built: 1st century BCE

Site notes
- Condition: In ruins

Parlais is a former Roman city of Pisidia (in Asia Minor).

== History ==
As a Roman colony it was called Julia Augusta Parlais, and money was coined under this title. Ptolemy calls it Paralais and places it in Lycaonia (also in Asia Minor). Kiepert identified it with Barla, in the Ottoman vilayet of Koniah, but W. M. Ramsay believes that it is contained in the ruins known as Uzumla Monastir. Modern scholars follow Kiepert.

== Ecclesiastical history ==
The bishopric of Parlais was a suffragan of Antioch, the metropolitan see of the province.

The Notitiæ Episcopatuum mention the see as late as the 13th century under the names Parlaos, Paralaos and even Parallos. Four bishops are known from their participation in church councils: Patricius, Constantinople, 381; Libanius, Chalcedon, 451 (in the decrees the see is placed in Lycaonia); George, Constantinople, 692; Anthimus, Constantinople, 879. Academius who assisted at the First Council of Nicaea, 325, was Bishop of Pappa, not of Parlais as Le Quien claims.

It is included in the Catholic Church's list of titular sees.
