= Eğirdir =

- Municipality
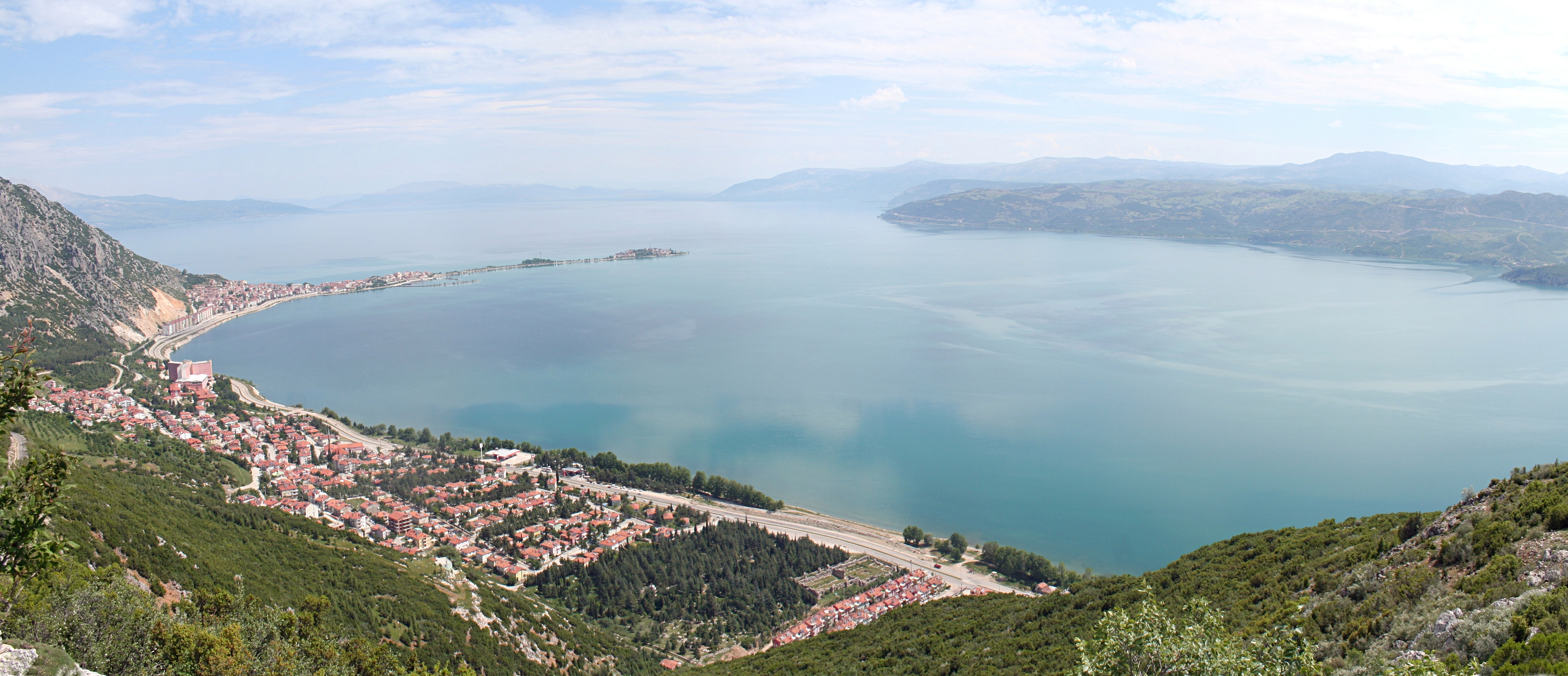
- View of Lake Eğirdir and the town

- Location within Turkey
- Coordinates: 37°52′30″N 30°51′02″E
- Country: Turkey
- Province: Isparta
- District: Eğirdir

Government
  - Mayor: Mustafa Özer (AKP)
- Elevation: 930 m (3,050 ft)
- Population (2022): 16,759
- Time zone: UTC+3 (TRT)
- Postal code: 32500
- Area code: 0246
- Website: www.egirdir.bel.tr

Eğirdir is a town in Isparta Province in the Mediterranean Region of Turkey. It is the seat of Eğirdir District. Its population is 16,759 (2022).

Eğirdir is located on a peninsula in Lake Eğirdir, with two nearby islands that are now connected to the mainland by a causeway. In the Middle Ages, the town was the capital of a small principality.

== Geography ==
Eğirdir is located near the south end of Lake Eğirdir, on a peninsula extending northwards into the lake. Immediately southwest of Eğirdir is a mountain called Eğirdirsivrisi or Camili dağı, which rises to 1,733 m above sea level. Northeast of Eğirdir are two islands called Can Ada and Yeşil Ada, which are now connected to the mainland by a causeway. Yeşil Ada was formerly called Nis Ada, probably derived from Greek νησί (nesí) "island". The town is located about 110 km north of Antalya.

=== Climate ===
Eğirdir has a hot-summer Mediterranean climate (Köppen: Csa) with some continental influence; hot, dry summers, and chilly, wet winters with frequent snow.

Climate data for Eğirdir (1991–2020)
Month	Jan	Feb	Mar	Apr	May	Jun	Jul	Aug	Sep	Oct	Nov	Dec	Year
Mean daily maximum °C (°F)	5.4 (41.7)	7.3 (45.1)	11.6 (52.9)	16.5 (61.7)	21.7 (71.1)	26.4 (79.5)	29.9 (85.8)	29.9 (85.8)	25.7 (78.3)	19.7 (67.5)	12.8 (55.0)	7.6 (45.7)	17.9 (64.2)
Daily mean °C (°F)	1.9 (35.4)	3.2 (37.8)	6.6 (43.9)	10.8 (51.4)	15.5 (59.9)	20.2 (68.4)	23.6 (74.5)	23.4 (74.1)	18.9 (66.0)	13.6 (56.5)	7.6 (45.7)	3.9 (39.0)	12.5 (54.5)
Mean daily minimum °C (°F)	−1.2 (29.8)	−0.3 (31.5)	2.4 (36.3)	5.6 (42.1)	9.5 (49.1)	13.7 (56.7)	16.8 (62.2)	16.4 (61.5)	12.2 (54.0)	8.0 (46.4)	3.1 (37.6)	0.5 (32.9)	7.3 (45.1)
Average precipitation mm (inches)	140.27 (5.52)	112.32 (4.42)	91.36 (3.60)	74.94 (2.95)	58.12 (2.29)	25.96 (1.02)	9.26 (0.36)	10.38 (0.41)	22.59 (0.89)	54.19 (2.13)	74.71 (2.94)	138.92 (5.47)	813.02 (32.01)
Average precipitation days (≥ 1.0 mm)	9.4	8.8	8.2	7.8	7.2	4.3	2.0	2.0	3.0	5.5	5.8	9.4	73.4
Average relative humidity (%)	79.1	75.3	69.1	65.8	65.1	58.8	53.5	55.5	60.1	68.8	74.1	79.0	67.0
Source: NOAA

== History ==
The town and the lake were formerly called Eğridir, a Turkish pronunciation and possible appropriation of the town's old Greek name Akrotiri. Moreover, the name "Eğridir" means '(It) is bent.'.

The Greek name Akroterion (Greek: Άκροτήριον) is first attested in 1438, although it was probably in use earlier, in Byzantine times. The discovery of numerous ancient coins suggests that there was an early settlement here. The ancient settlement of Prostanna was most likely located nearby, on the Eğirdirsivrisi mountain. The Seljuks first conquered it around 1080. It was probably conquered along with Isparta in 1204 by Kilij Arslan III of the Seljuk Sultanate of Rum. The later Seljuk sultan Kayqubad I probably built the town's citadel during his reign in the 1220s-30s.

In the 1300s, Eğirdir (also known as Falakābād during this period) became the capital of the Hamidoğulları beylik. Ibn Battuta, who visited the town in 1332 (and called it Akrīdūr in Arabic), described it as "a great and populous city with fine bazaars and running streams, mosques, fruit trees and orchards", which was situated beside "a lake of sweet water". He also referred to merchant shipping on Lake Eğirdir at this point. The Hamidoğulları principality lasted until 1381.

Can Ada was uninhabited in ancient and medieval times, but Yeşil Ada used to have a domed Christian basilica decorated with numerous frescoes which are stylistically dated to the 9th through 13th centuries. Another adjacent church, now converted into a mosque, was dated to the 14th century.

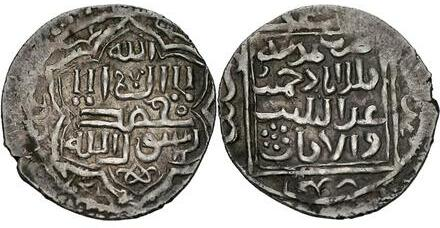
Coin minted in Felekabad by Felek al-Din Dündar of Hamid (r. 1300–26) in 1321/2.

Timur captured Eğirdir in 1403, and then the Ottomans took control in 1417. Most of Eğirdir's population consisted of Greek Orthodox people until the population exchanges of the 1920s.

== Features ==
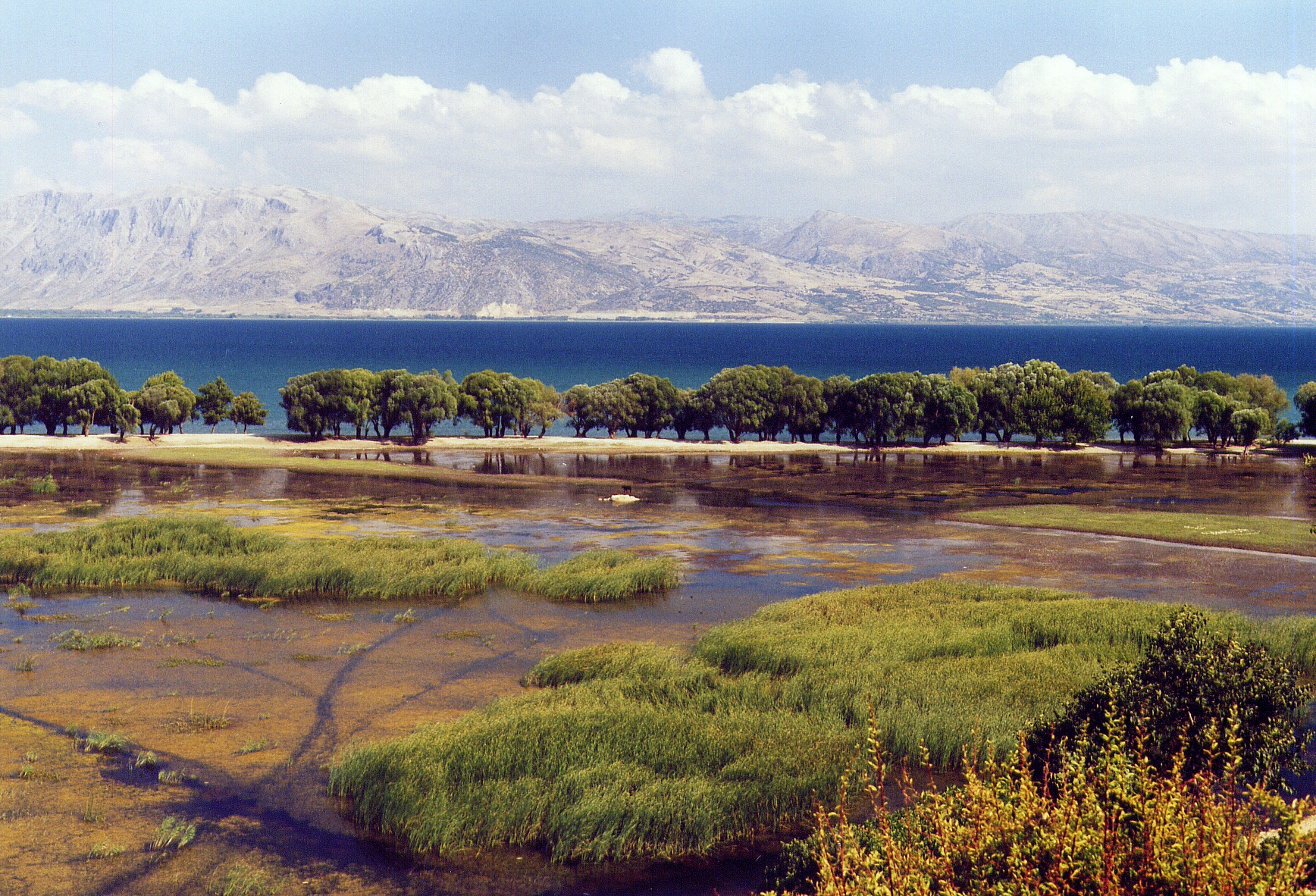
View of Lake Eğirdir

Eğirdir lies between Lake Eğirdir and the Mount Sivri, and contains the Eğirdir Castle said to have been built by Croesus, king of Lydia, although additions were built by the Romans, Byzantines, and Seljuks.

The population of Eğirdir was 19,469 in 2010, but swells in the summer months as part-time residents return for the holidays. Eğirdir is a fishing community and local residents fish in Lake Eğirdir year round.

Yeşil Ada (Turkish for "green island") is a small island connected to Eğirdir by a short causeway. Restaurants, hotels, pensions (pansiyons or hostels), and a few private residences fill the island. Known for its past as a Greek village, Yeşıl Ada still has quite a few stone homes remaining from the Greek era.

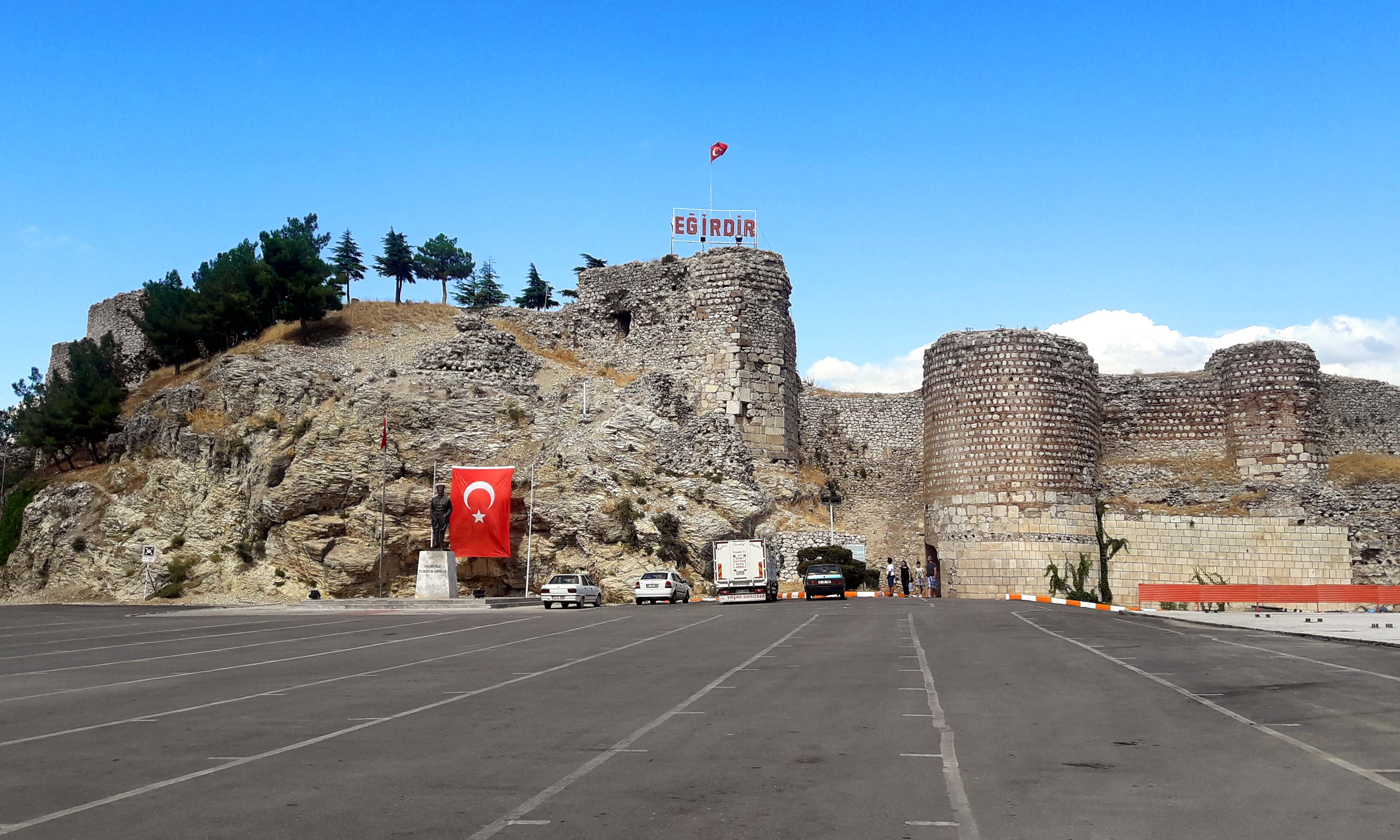
Eğirdir Castle

Locals claim that Eğirdir is home to the world's only walk-through minaret.

Eğirdir became a member of Cittaslow on February 4, 2017.

== See also ==
- List of lakes in Turkey
- Sirmione (Sirmio peninsula) on Lake Garda in Italy

== Gallery ==
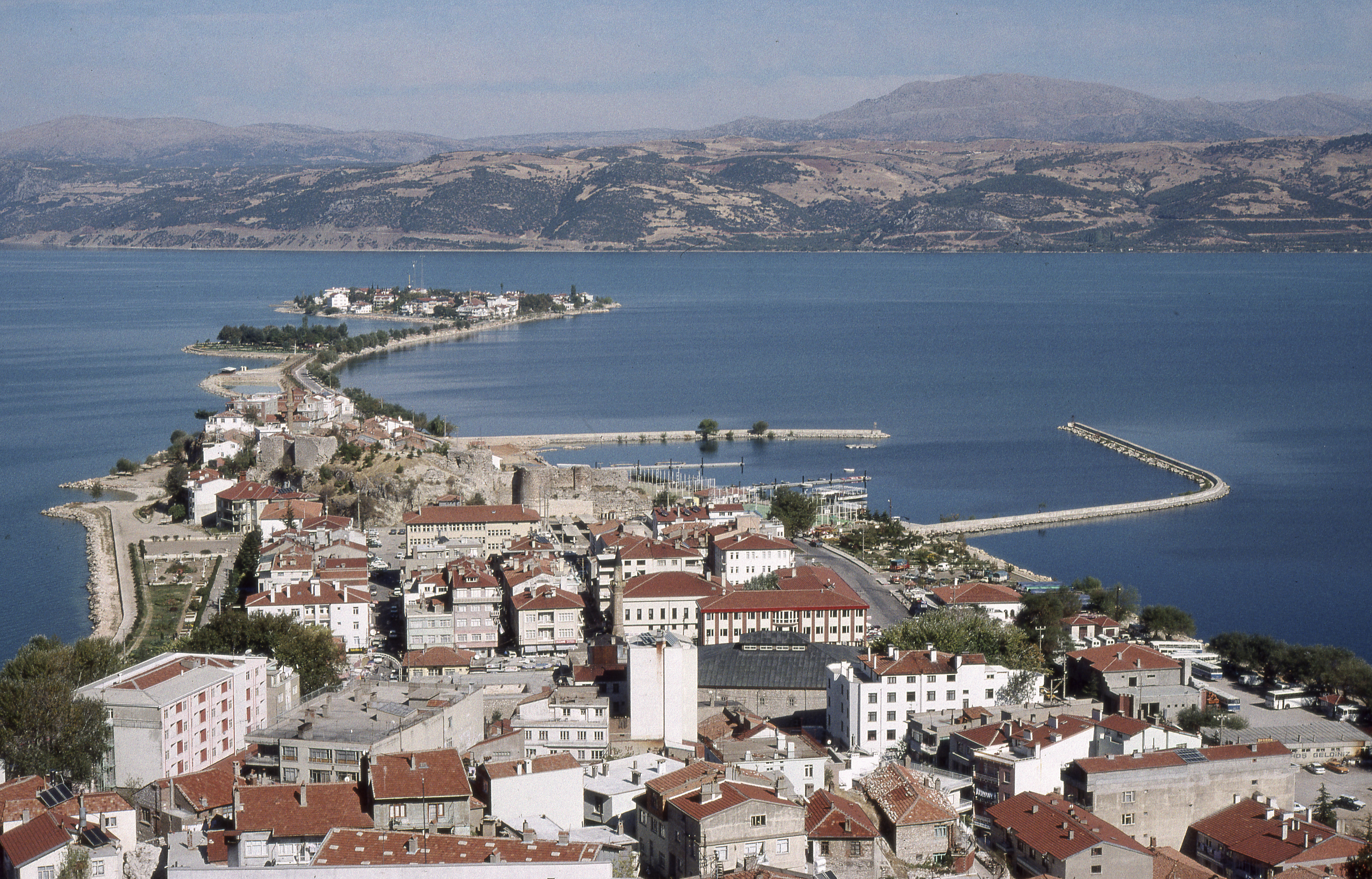
Eğirdir View

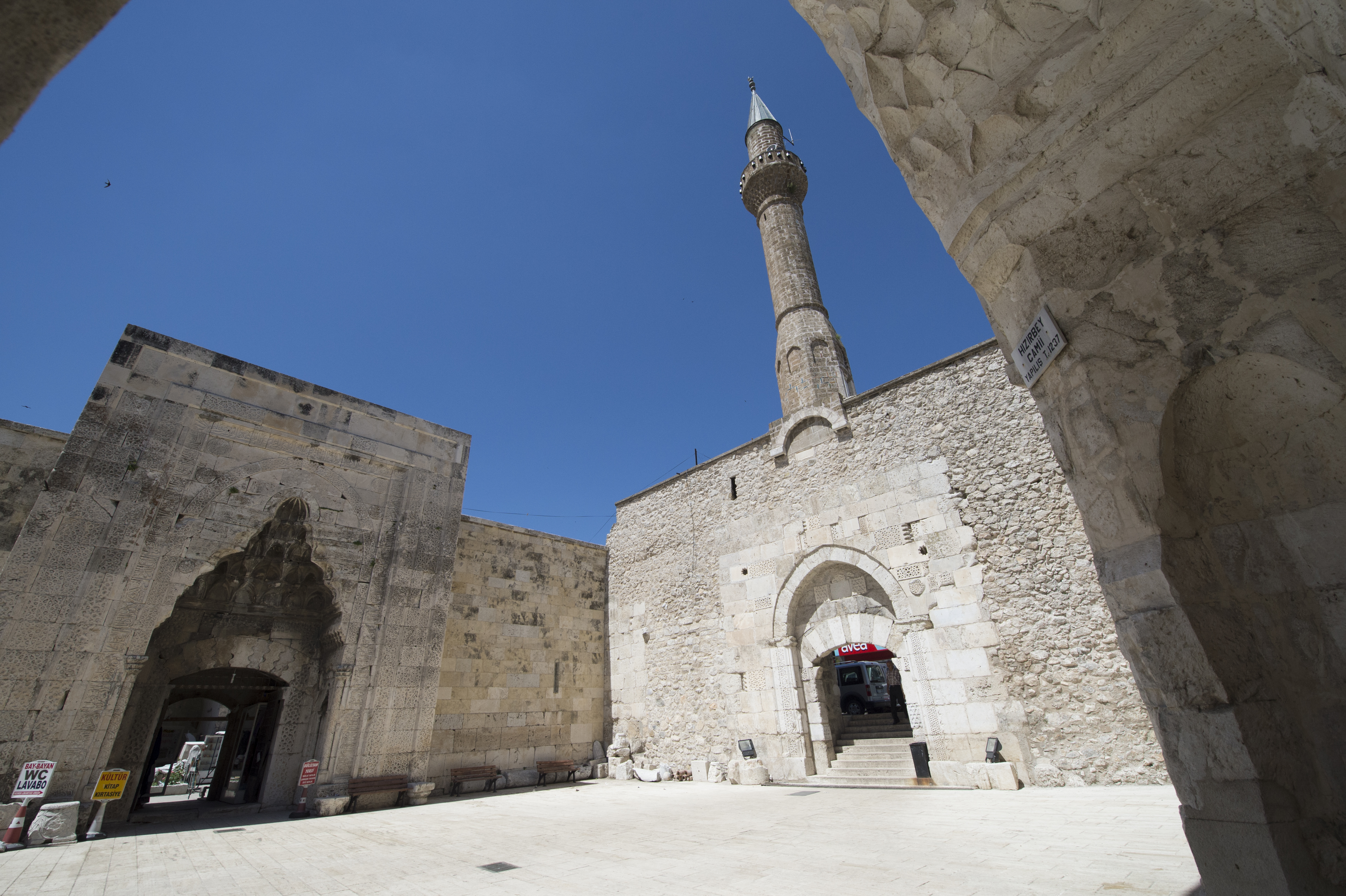
Eğirdir Dünbar Bey Medresesi and Hızır Bey Camii

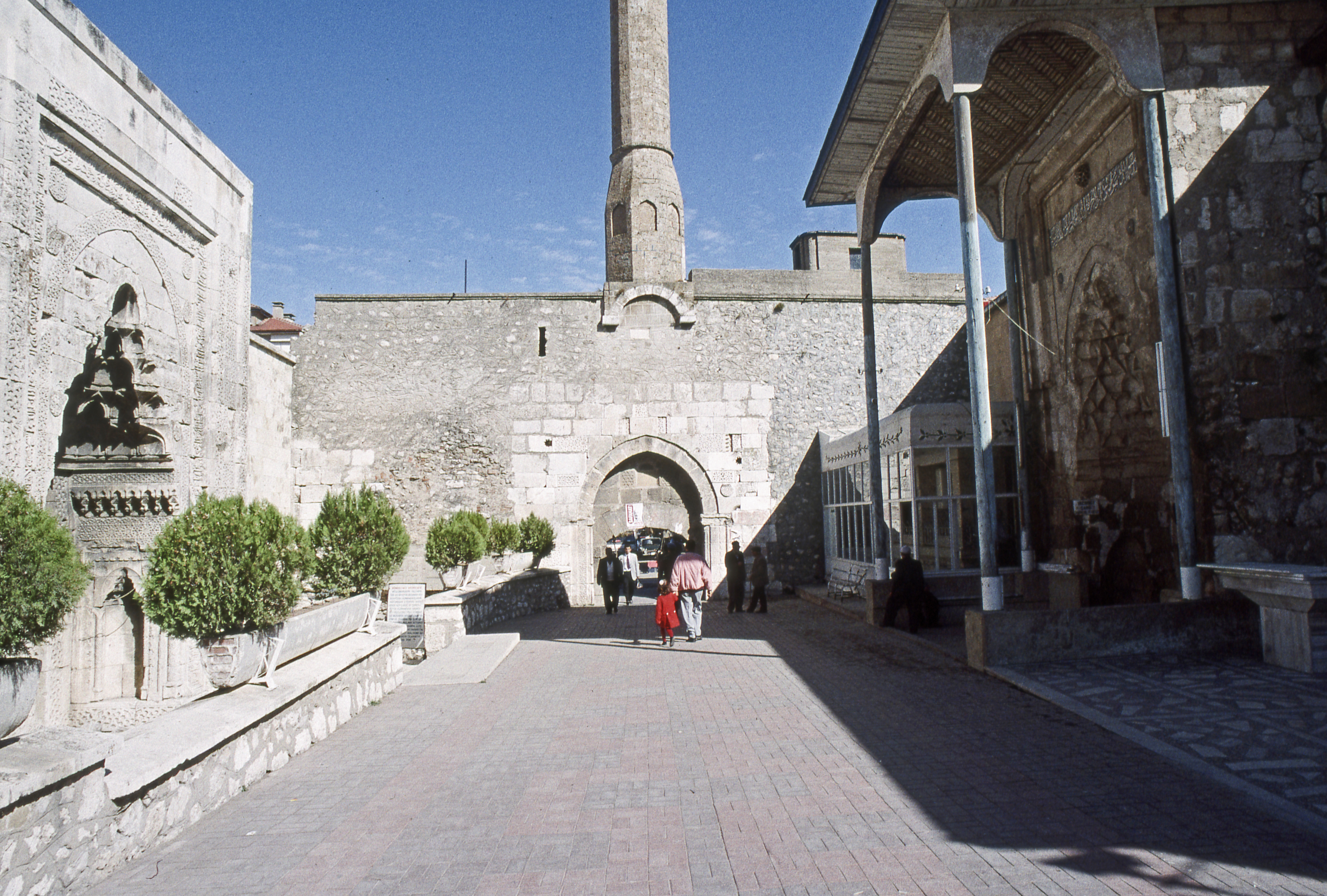
Eğirdir Dünbar Bey Medresesi, Hızır Bey Camiye

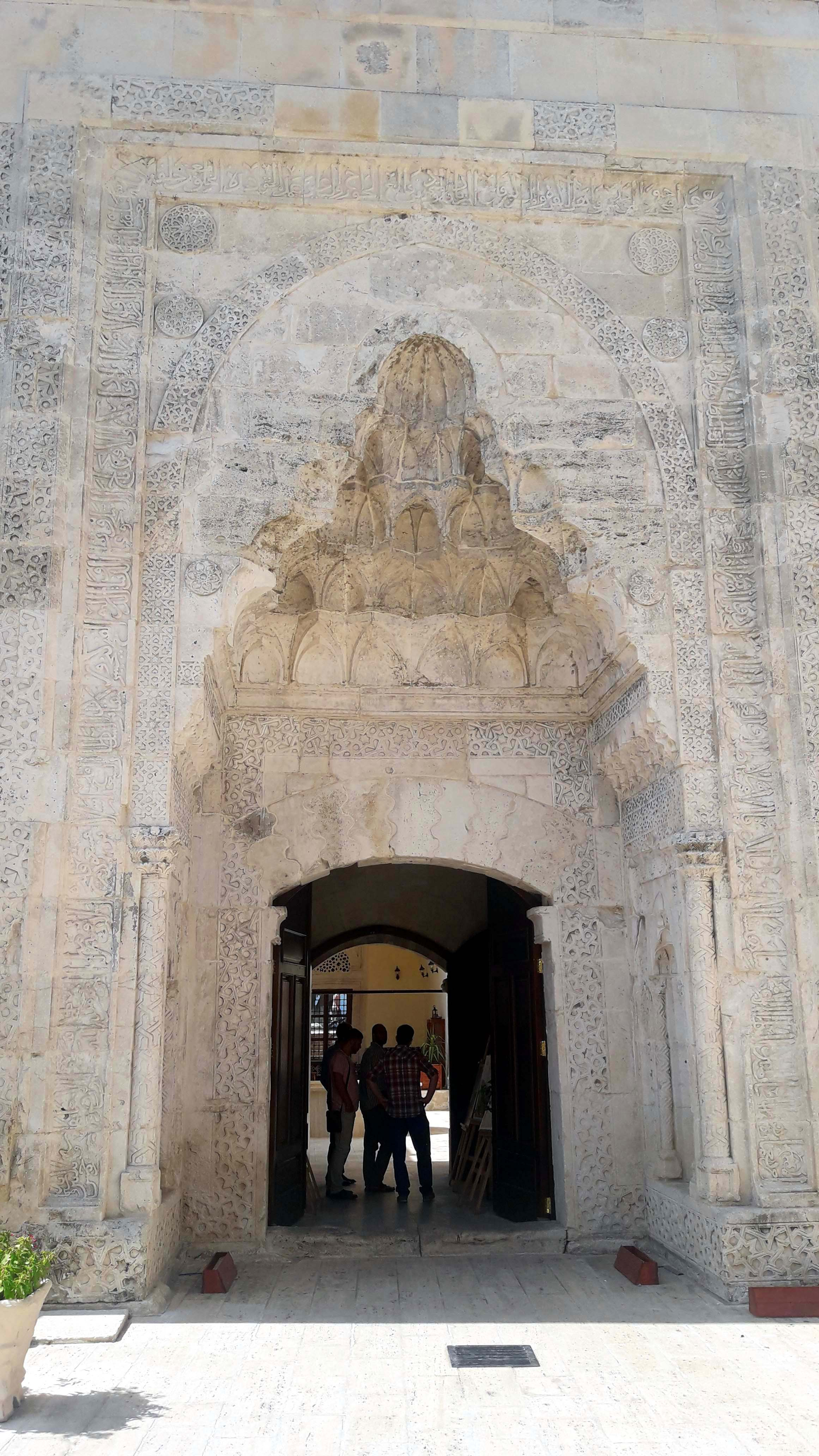
Dündar Bey Madrasa

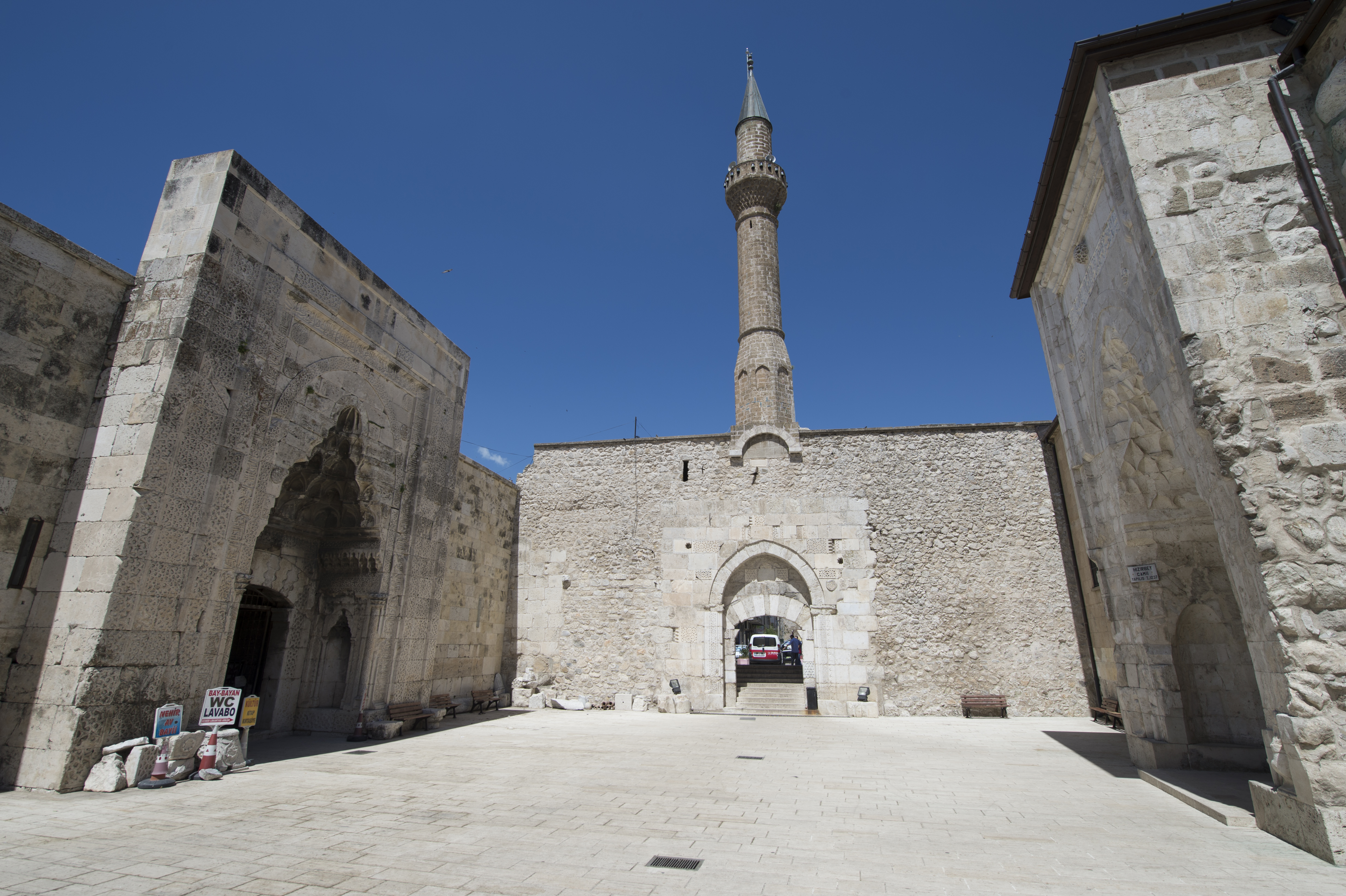
Eğirdir Dünbar Bey Medresesi and Hızır Bey Camii years later

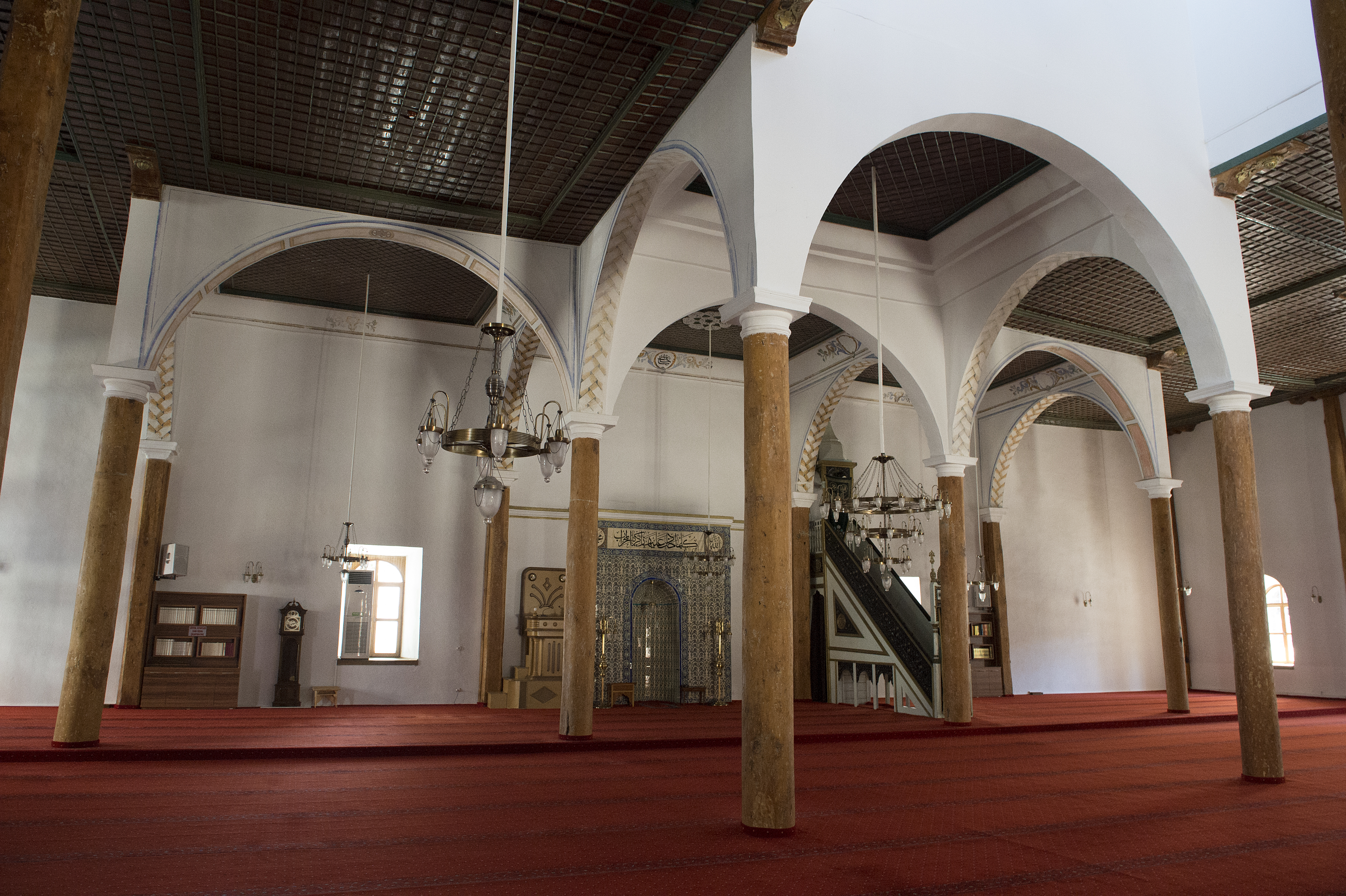
Eğirdir Hızır Bey Camii interior

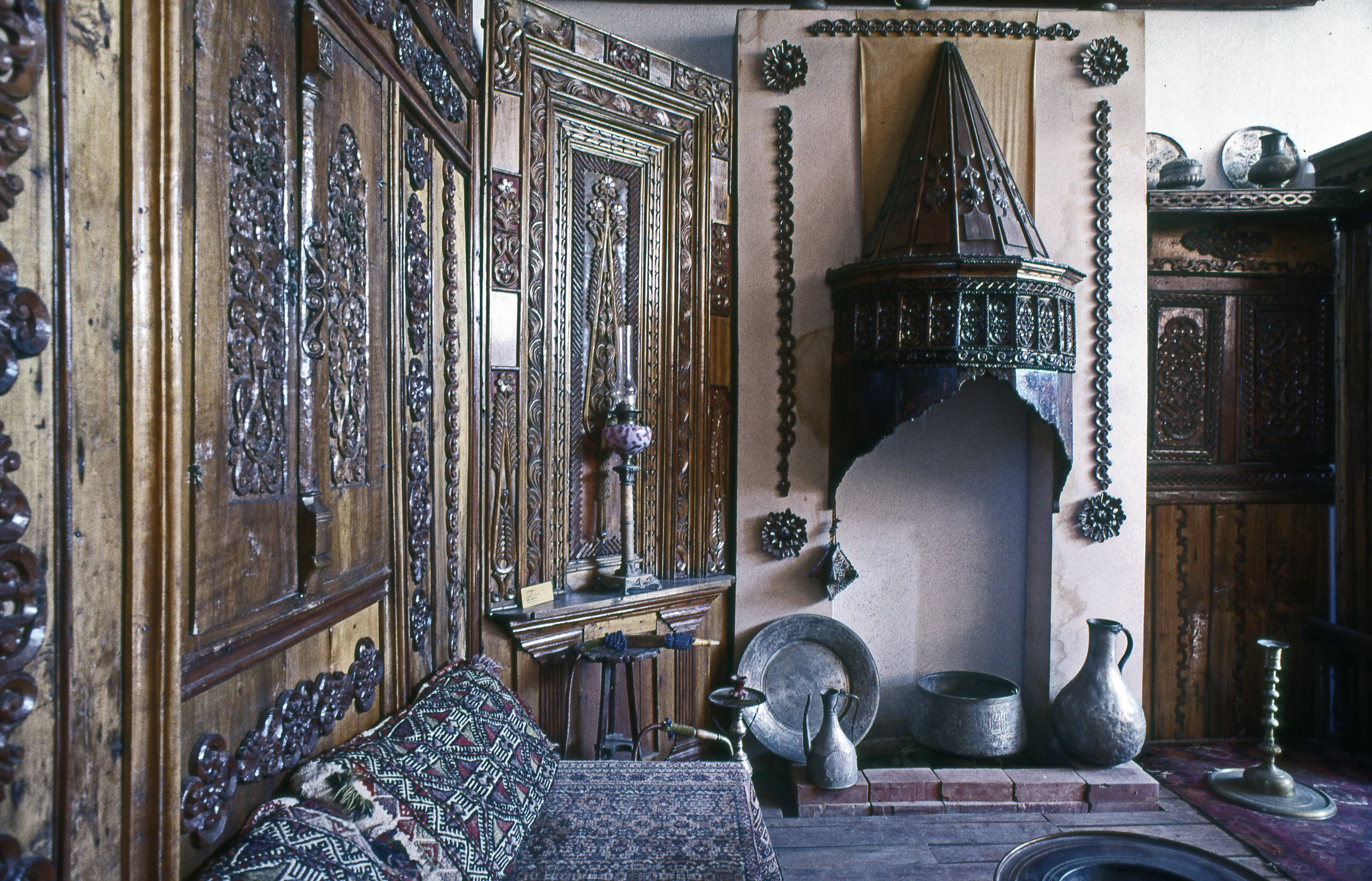
Eğirdir Museum

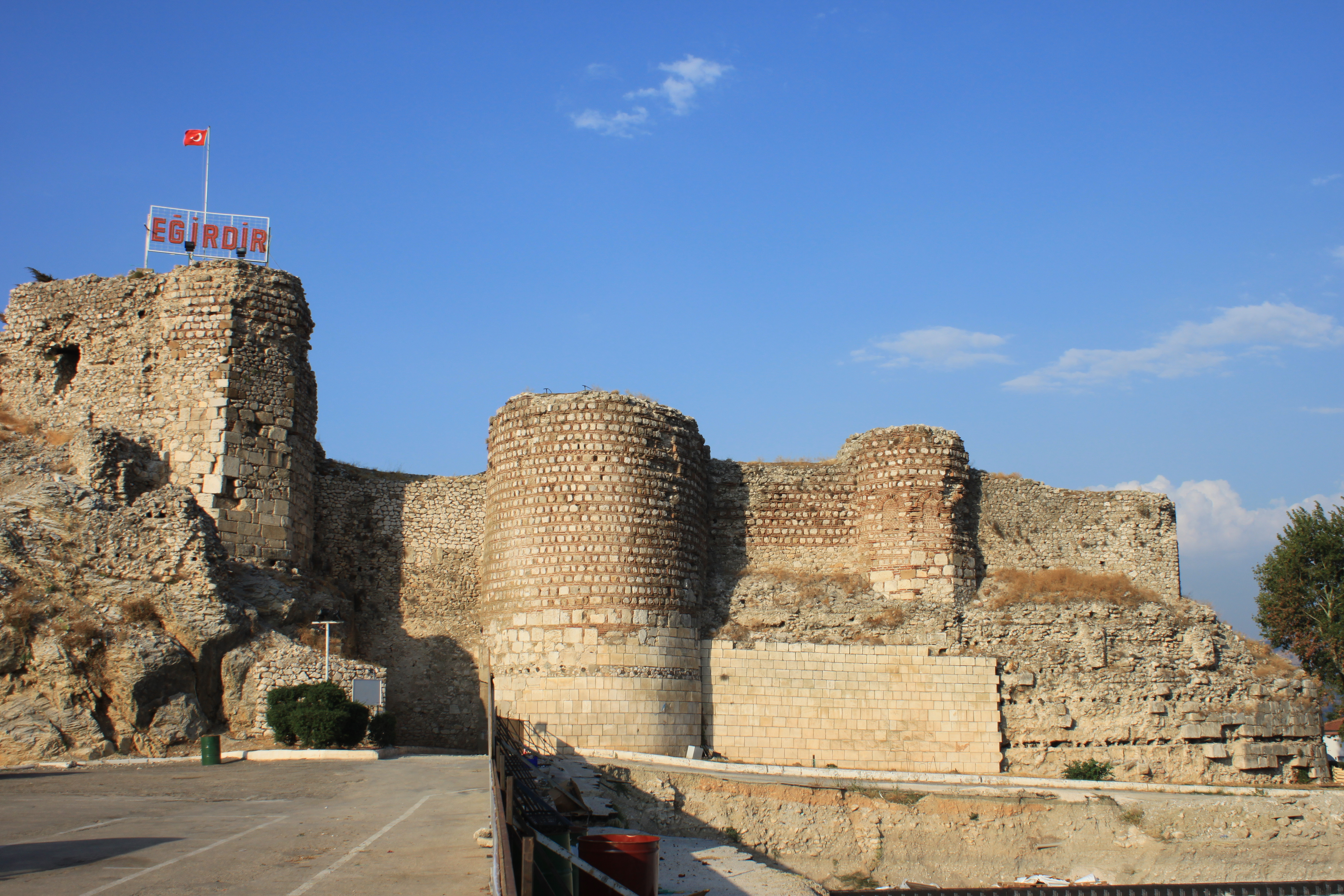
Eğirdir, byzantinisch-seldschukische Burg
