= Hamidids =

Anatolian beylik

Beylik of Hamid Hamidoğulları Beyliği
- c. 1301–1391
- Map of the Anatolian Beyliks including the Hamidids
- Status: Sovereign State
- Government: Beylik
- Bey
  - c. 1301–1324: Felek al-Din Dündar (first)
  - c. 1374–1391: Kamal al-Din Husayn (last)
- Historical era: Middle Ages
  - Established: c. 1301
  - Disestablished: 1391
Preceded by	Succeeded by
Sultanate of Rum	Sanjak of Hamid
- Today part of: Turkey

The Hamidids (Modern Turkish: Hamidoğulları or Hamidoğulları Beyliği) was one of the Turkish beyliks in Anatolia during the 14th century. It emerged as a consequence of the decline of the Sultanate of Rum and ruled in the regions around Eğirdir and Isparta in southwestern Anatolia.

The Beylik was founded by Dündar Bey (also called Felek al-Din Bey), whose father Ilyas and grandfather Hamid had been frontier rulers under the Seljuks. Felek al- Din's brother Yunus Bey founded the Beylik of Teke centered in Antalya and Korkuteli, neighboring the Hamidid dynasty to the south. During the reign of Ottoman Sultan Murad I, the rulers of Hamit were persuaded to sell Akşehir and Beyşehir.

The Hamidid beylik was annexed by the Ottoman sultan Bayezid I in 1391. Their territory became the Ottoman Sanjak of Hamid, roughly corresponding to the present-day Isparta Province.

== Rulers ==
Bey	Reign	Notes
Felek al-Din Dündar	c. 1301–1324	
Khidr Beg ibn Dündar	1327–1328	
Najm al-Din Ishaq ibn Dündar	1328–c. 1344	
Muzaffar al-Din Mustafa ibn Muhammad ibn Dündar	c. 1344–?	
Husam al-Din Ilyas ibn Mustafa	?–c. 1374	
Kamal al-Din Husayn ibn Ilyas	c. 1374–1391	

== See also ==
- List of Sunni Muslim dynasties
