= Isparta =

- Municipality
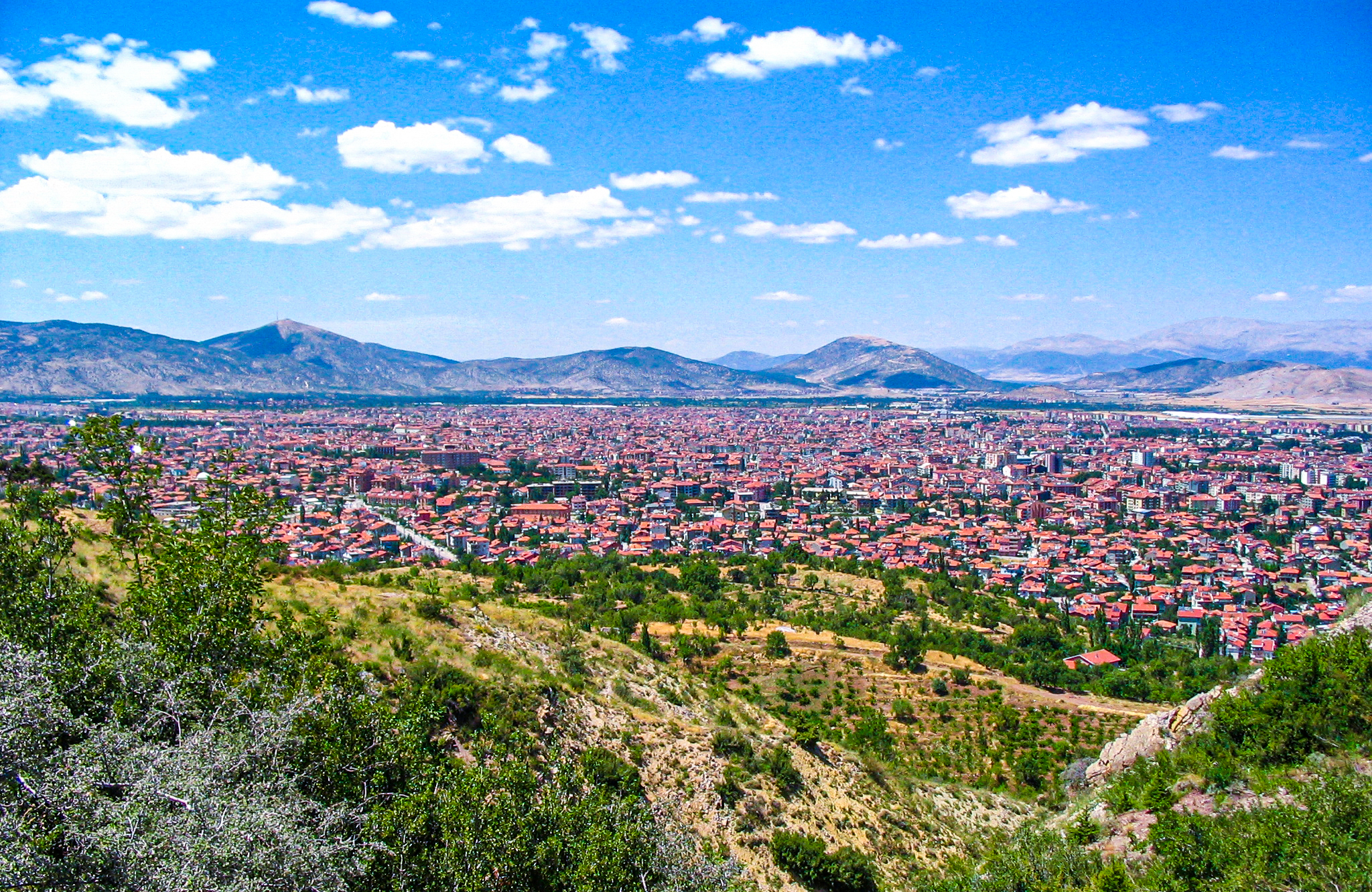
- Isparta seen from a mountain

- Logo

- Location within Turkey
- Coordinates: 37°45′53″N 30°33′24″E
- Country: Turkey
- Province: Isparta
- District: Isparta

Government
  - Mayor: Şükrü Başdeğirmen (AK Party)
- Elevation: 1,035 m (3,396 ft)
- Population (2022): 247,580
- Time zone: UTC+3 (TRT)
- Postal code: 32000
- Area code: 0246
- Website: www.isparta.bel.tr

Isparta is a city in western Turkey. It is the seat of Isparta Province and Isparta District. Its population is 247,580 (2022). Its elevation is 1035 m. It is known as the "City of Roses" and “City where Sun Resides” Isparta is well-connected to other parts of Turkey via roads. Antalya lies 130 km to the south and Eskişehir is 350 km to the north. Süleyman Demirel University has introduced thousands of youths from varied backgrounds to the city's mostly conservative fabric in recent years. The city’s football team, Isparta 32 Spor, was founded in 1976 in Isparta. The club’s colors are green and pink, and the team plays its home matches at the 4,345-seat Isparta Atatürk City Stadium. It currently competes in the TFF Second League.

== History ==
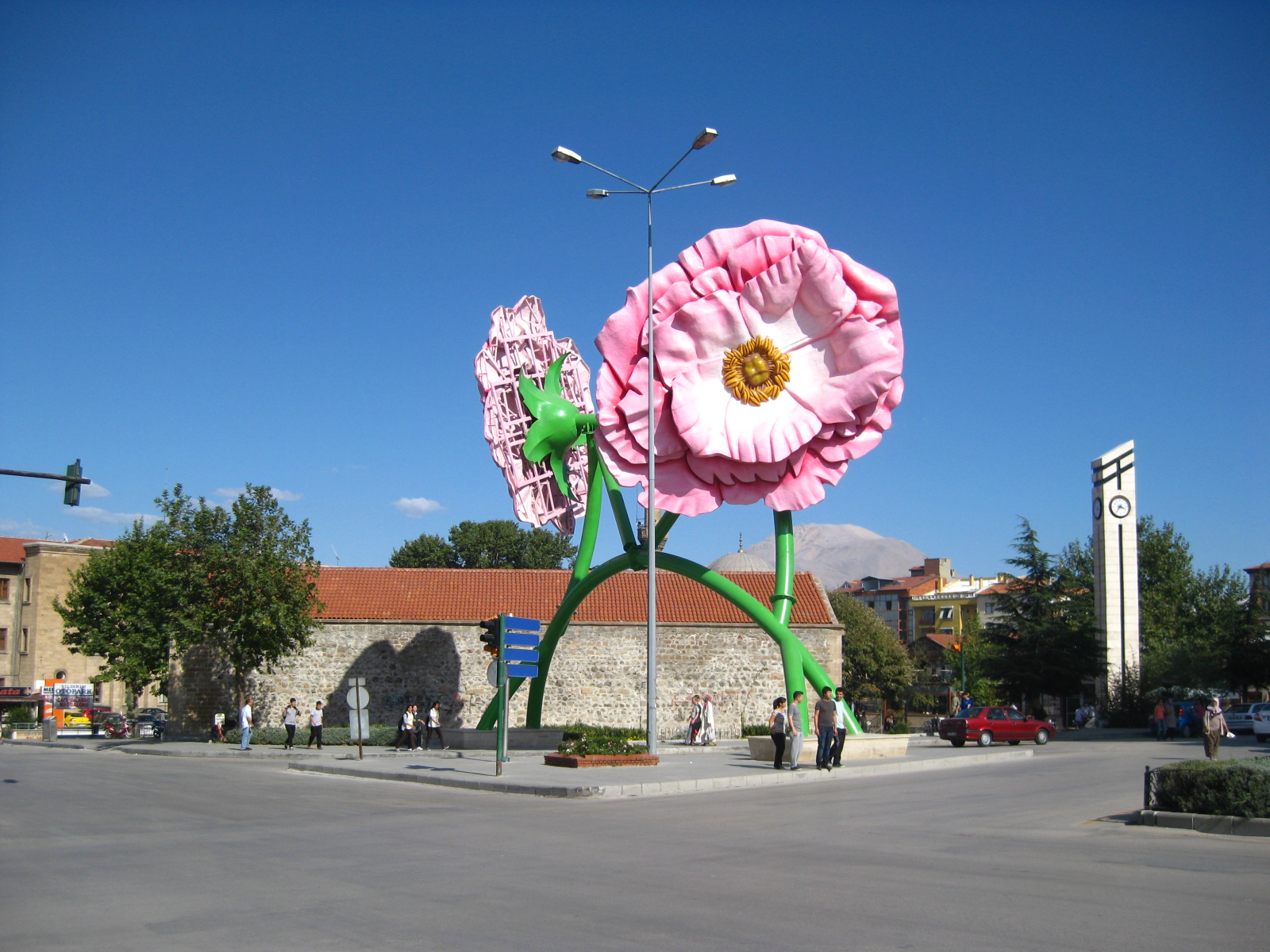
Isparta is known as the city of roses

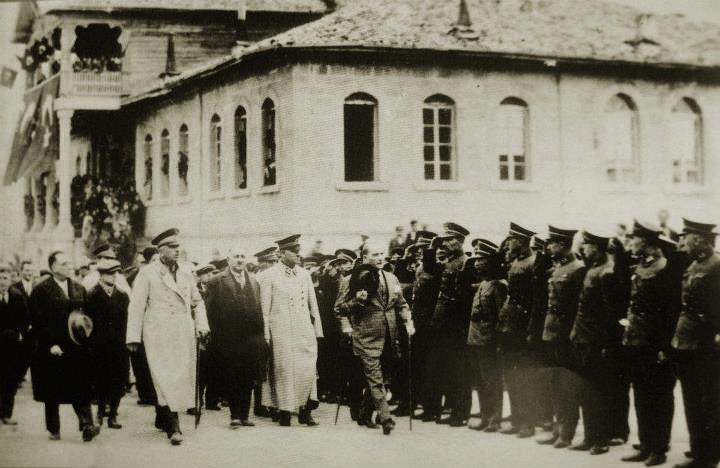
Kemal in Isparta March 6, 1930.

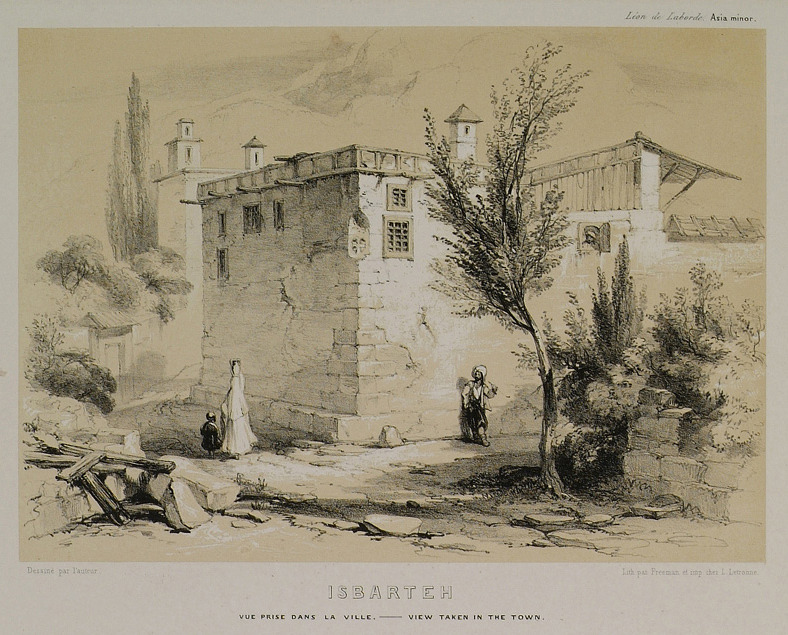
Isparta View taken in the city - Laborde Léon Emmanuel Simon Joseph - 1838.

- 1071: Conquered by the Seljuk Turks.
- Late 13th century: Becomes part of the Hamidids.
- 1381: Isparta is sold to the Ottoman sultan Murad I by the Hamidid Emir.
- Late 19th century: Muslim refugees from the Balkans settle around Isparta. The Bulgarian refugees brought the knowledge of kazanlik rosewater production with them, leading to Isparta's nickname: city of roses.
- 1914: According to the 1914 Ottoman population statistics, the district of Isparta had a total population of 54.465, consisting of 46.698 Muslims, 6.648 Greeks and 1.119 Armenians.
- 1923: The Greek inhabitants of the area were forced to move to Greece under the Greco-Turkish population exchange.

=== Roman era ===
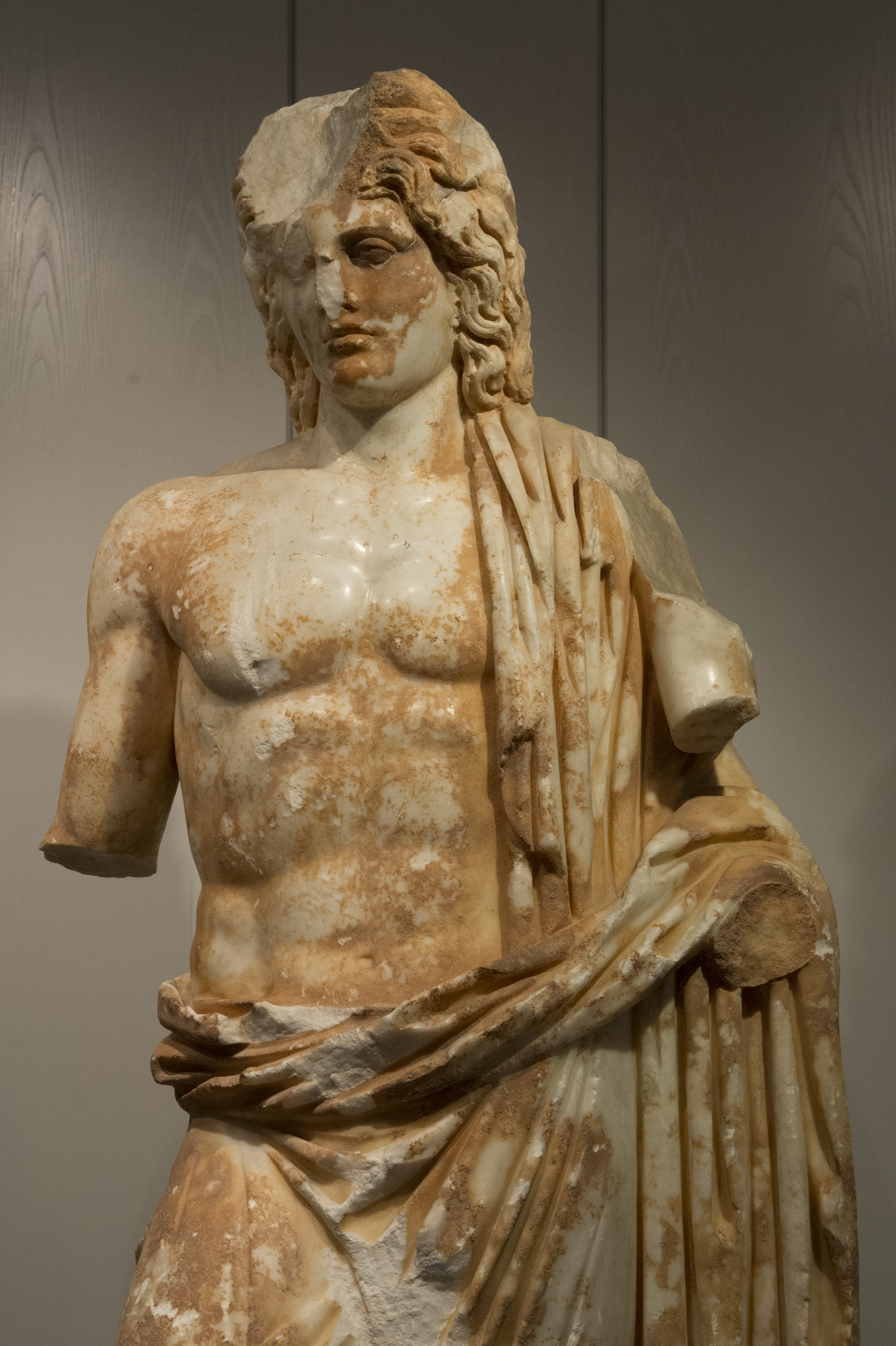
Men, the local god. Statue in Hellenistic style, Roman period, +/- 2nd century AD in Isparta Museum

Isparta is a Turkish spelling of Greek Sparta, by prothesis declustering. Isparta was said to correspond to the ancient city of Baris, which is a namesake and was part of the Roman province of Pisidia. A later theory has it instead as the Eastern Roman fortress Saporda; in Muslim sources it appears as Sabarta. GE Bean characterized the situation thus: "These perpetually shifting conceptions leave the reader quite bewildered." Modern scholars locate Baris near Kılıç, in Keçiborlu district, Isparta province.

=== Notable flight crashes ===
On 19 September 1976, Turkish Airlines Flight 452, a Boeing 727 aircraft, crashed on a hill in Isparta, also known Mount Karatepe, killing all 154 passengers and crew. On 30 November 2007, Atlasjet Flight 4203 crashed on approach to Isparta Süleyman Demirel Airport, killing all 57 passengers and crew.

== Ecclesiastical history ==
At an early stage it became a Christian bishopric, a suffragan of the Metropolitan see of Antioch of Pisidia, the capital of the province. The names of two of its bishops are known with certainty: Heraclius participated in the First Council of Nicaea in 325 and Leo in the Second Council of Nicaea in 787. In addition, Paulus was at the Council of Constantinople (869) and Stephanus was at the Council of Constantinople (879), but one or both of these may have been of the Baris in the Roman province of Hellespontus.

In the middle of the 19th century, the city had around 1,000 Greek Orthodox Christian families.

=== Titular See ===
No longer a residential bishopric, 'Baris in Pisidia' is today listed by the Catholic Church as a titular bishopric, nominal suffragan of Nicomedia, since the diocese was nominally restored in 1933: Latin adjective Baren(us) in Pisidia (Latin). It has been vacant for decades, having had the following incumbents, so far of the fitting Episcopal (lowest) rank:

- Alfred Bertram Leverman (1948.04.24 – 1953.07.27) as Auxiliary Bishop of Halifax (Canada) (1948.04.24 – 1953.07.27); later Bishop of Saint John, New Brunswick (Canada) (1953.07.27 – 1968.09.07), emeritate as Titular Bishop of Altava (1968.09.07 – death 1972.04.28)
- José de Almeida Batista Pereira (1953.12.22 – 1955.11.07) as Auxiliary Bishop of Niterói (Brazil) (1953.12.22 – 1955.11.07), Bishop of Sete Lagoas (Brazil) (1955.11.07 – 1964.04.02), Bishop of Guaxupé (Brazil) (1964.04.02 – retired 1976.01.16); died 2009
- António Cardoso Cunha (1956.03.09 – 1967.01.10), first as Auxiliary Bishop of Beja (Portugal) (1956.03.09 – 1965), then as Coadjutor Bishop of Vila Real (Portugal) (1965 – 1967.01.10), next succeeded as Bishop of Vila Real (1967.01.10 – retired 1991.01.19), died 2004.

== Economy ==
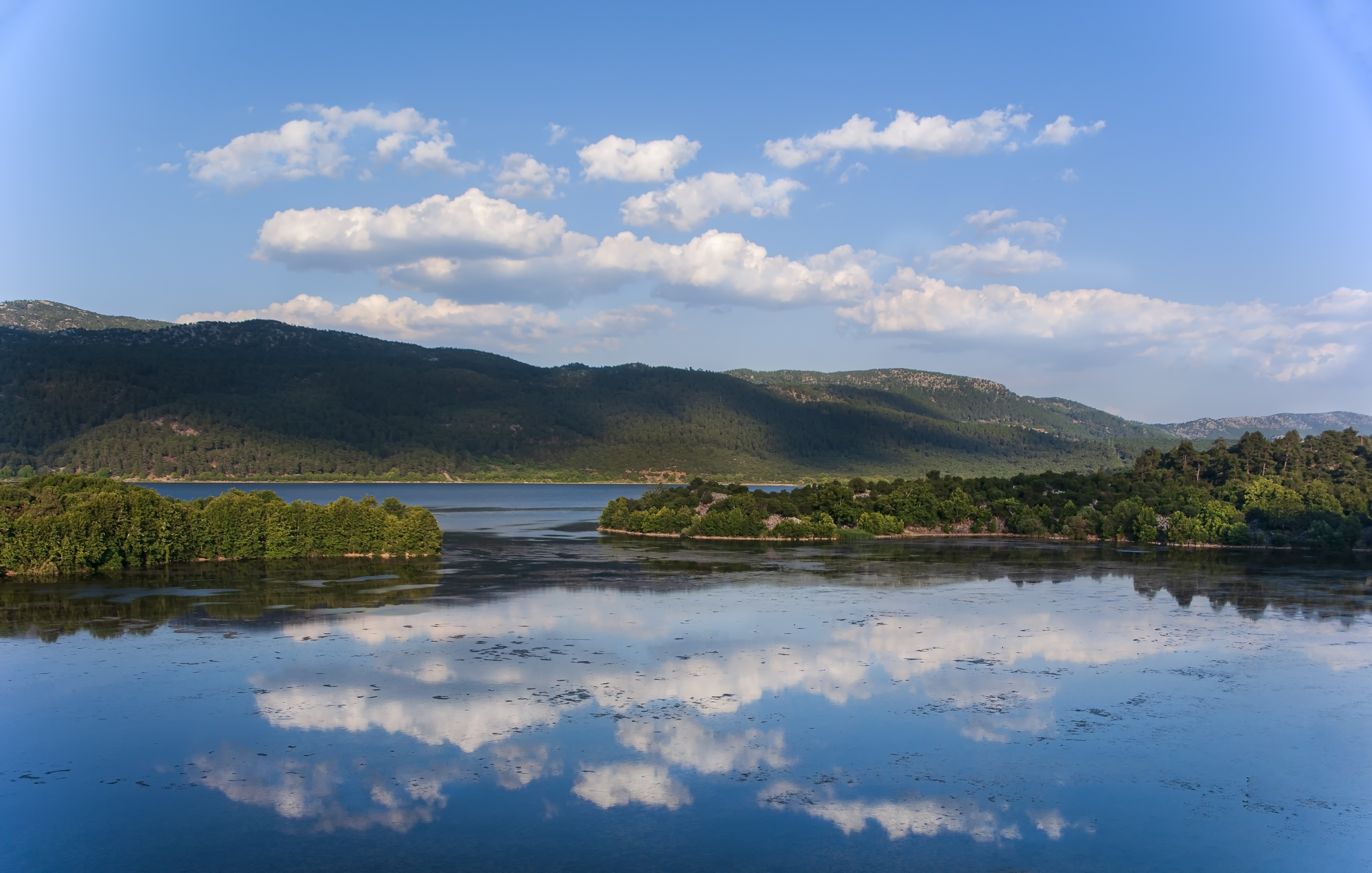
Lake Kovada National Park, a popular tourism destination in Isparta Province

The main economic activities of Isparta are the production of rosewater and handmade carpets. Tourism, both local and increasingly international due to "biblical tourism", is becoming an important source of revenue. In the early 20th century, carpetmaking was a major industry in Isparta.

== Climate ==
Isparta has a Hot-summer Mediterranean climate (Köppen climate classification: Csa), or a temperate continental climate (Trewartha climate classification: Dc). Winters are chilly, rainy and often snowy, summers are hot and dry. The lakes around the city have an important moderating influence on the climate. Precipitation occurs mostly in the winter months, with a notable decrease in summer.

Climate data for Isparta (1991–2020, extremes 1929–2023)
Month	Jan	Feb	Mar	Apr	May	Jun	Jul	Aug	Sep	Oct	Nov	Dec	Year
Record high °C (°F)	17.6 (63.7)	22.5 (72.5)	26.8 (80.2)	29.5 (85.1)	35.4 (95.7)	36.2 (97.2)	39.2 (102.6)	40.3 (104.5)	37.4 (99.3)	33.5 (92.3)	25.4 (77.7)	20.0 (68.0)	40.3 (104.5)
Mean daily maximum °C (°F)	6.6 (43.9)	8.4 (47.1)	12.3 (54.1)	17.0 (62.6)	22.3 (72.1)	27.3 (81.1)	31.2 (88.2)	31.4 (88.5)	27.2 (81.0)	21.2 (70.2)	14.4 (57.9)	8.5 (47.3)	19.0 (66.2)
Daily mean °C (°F)	1.8 (35.2)	3.3 (37.9)	6.6 (43.9)	10.8 (51.4)	15.6 (60.1)	20.3 (68.5)	24.0 (75.2)	23.9 (75.0)	19.3 (66.7)	13.8 (56.8)	7.7 (45.9)	3.5 (38.3)	12.5 (54.5)
Mean daily minimum °C (°F)	−2.1 (28.2)	−1.1 (30.0)	1.3 (34.3)	4.8 (40.6)	8.9 (48.0)	13.0 (55.4)	16.2 (61.2)	16.0 (60.8)	11.5 (52.7)	7.2 (45.0)	2.2 (36.0)	−0.5 (31.1)	6.5 (43.7)
Record low °C (°F)	−19.2 (−2.6)	−21.0 (−5.8)	−18.5 (−1.3)	−7.7 (18.1)	−1.2 (29.8)	4.3 (39.7)	4.9 (40.8)	7.0 (44.6)	−0.8 (30.6)	−4.2 (24.4)	−11.5 (11.3)	−15.4 (4.3)	−21.0 (−5.8)
Average precipitation mm (inches)	70.3 (2.77)	51.5 (2.03)	55.2 (2.17)	51.6 (2.03)	60.1 (2.37)	30.9 (1.22)	19.3 (0.76)	16.1 (0.63)	20.8 (0.82)	38.5 (1.52)	43.6 (1.72)	68.4 (2.69)	526.3 (20.72)
Average precipitation days	12.17	10.97	11.10	11.60	12.20	7.60	3.83	4.10	4.93	7.27	7.73	11.63	105.1
Average snowy days	5.5	5	2.75	0.5	0	0	0	0	0	0	0.54	2.5	16.79
Average relative humidity (%)	73.8	69.7	65	62	60.6	54.4	47.3	48.9	53.7	63.1	68.5	74.8	61.8
Mean monthly sunshine hours	115.4	136.6	178.2	202.6	247.6	296.2	335.9	315.6	274.1	216.1	164.0	107.9	2,590.3
Mean daily sunshine hours	3.7	4.8	5.8	6.8	8.1	9.9	10.8	10.2	9.1	7.0	5.5	3.6	7.1
Source 1: Turkish State Meteorological Service
Source 2: NOAA(humidity, sun 1991-2020), Meteomanz(snow days 2000-2023)

== Sights ==
Aya Baniya Kilisesi - Museum of scents

The city lies close to a fault line and is thus prone to violent earthquakes. Most of the ancient city was destroyed by an earthquake 1914. So there are only a few historical buildings left. The oldest building is the Kutlu Bey Mosque (or Ulu Camii, which means great Mosque), built in 1429 by Kutlu Bey, a general of Sultan Murad II. It was very badly destroyed by the earthquake 1914, but restored 1922. Famous is the Firdevs-Bey-Camii (Mosque) (also: Firdevs Paşa Camii, Mimar Sinan Camii) from 1561. The mosque and the neighboring Bedesten (market hall) are attributed to the architect Sinan. Badly damaged by earthquake in 1914, it was renovated afterwards. Most of the churches have been destroyed, only a few remain, especially the Aya Payana Church (Turkish: Aya Baniya Kilisesi); a Greek-Orthodox church from 1750. In a state of ruin since 1923, the roof was re-covered in 1999. Another renovation is planned but has not yet been carried out (as of 2022). The building houses a museum of scents.

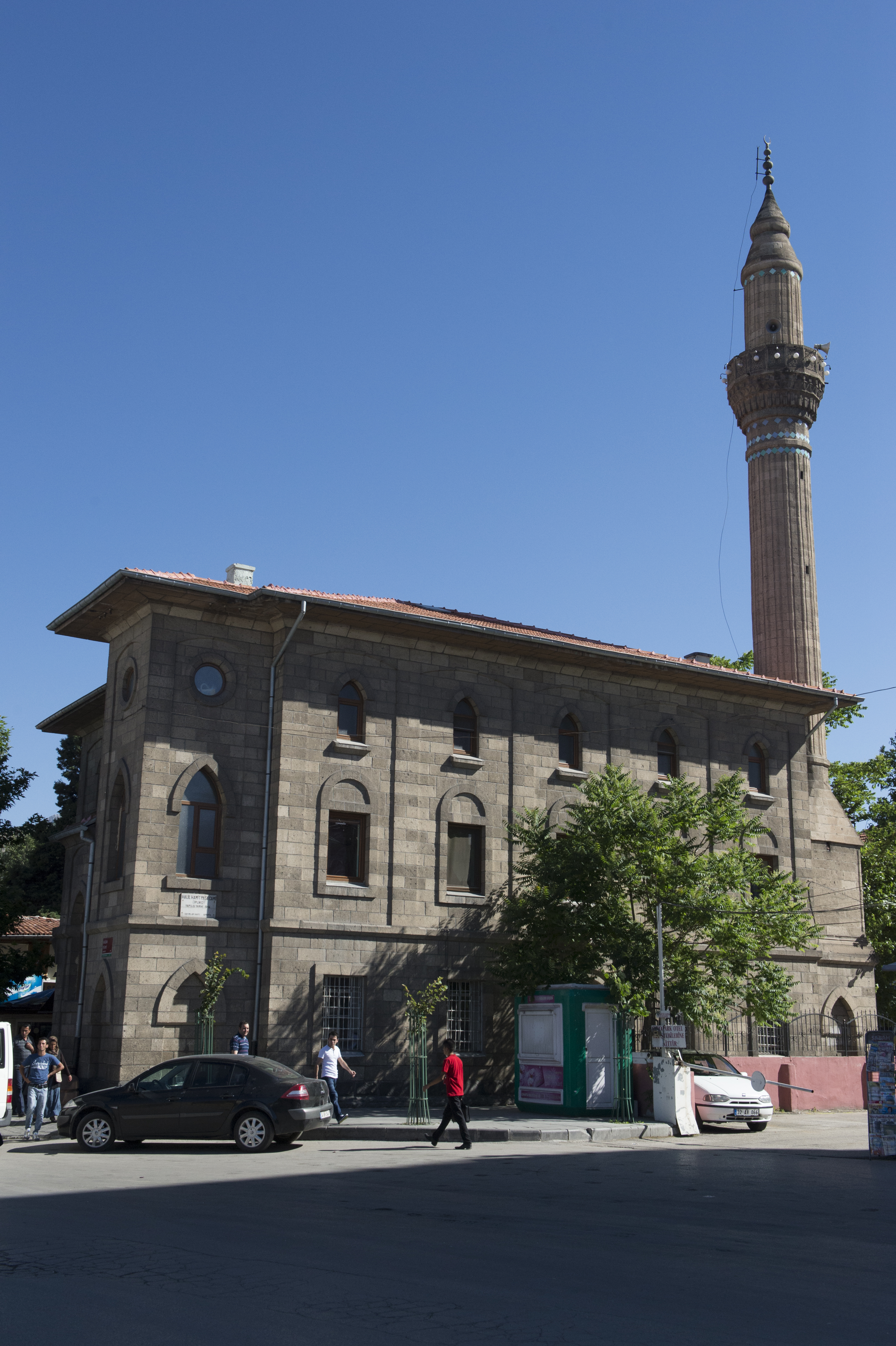
Isparta Iplik Camii

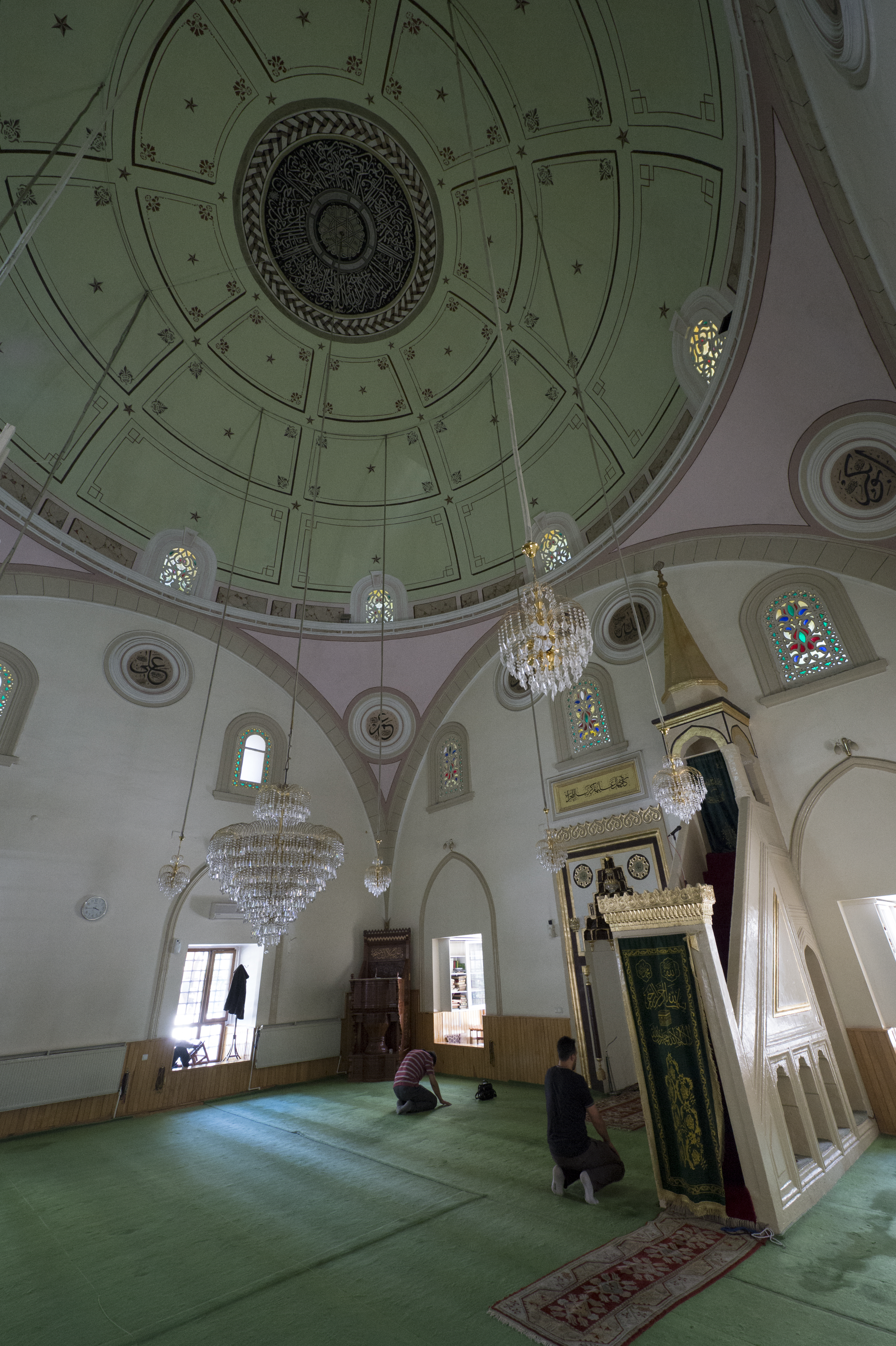
Isparta Mimar Sinan (Firdevs Paşa) Cami

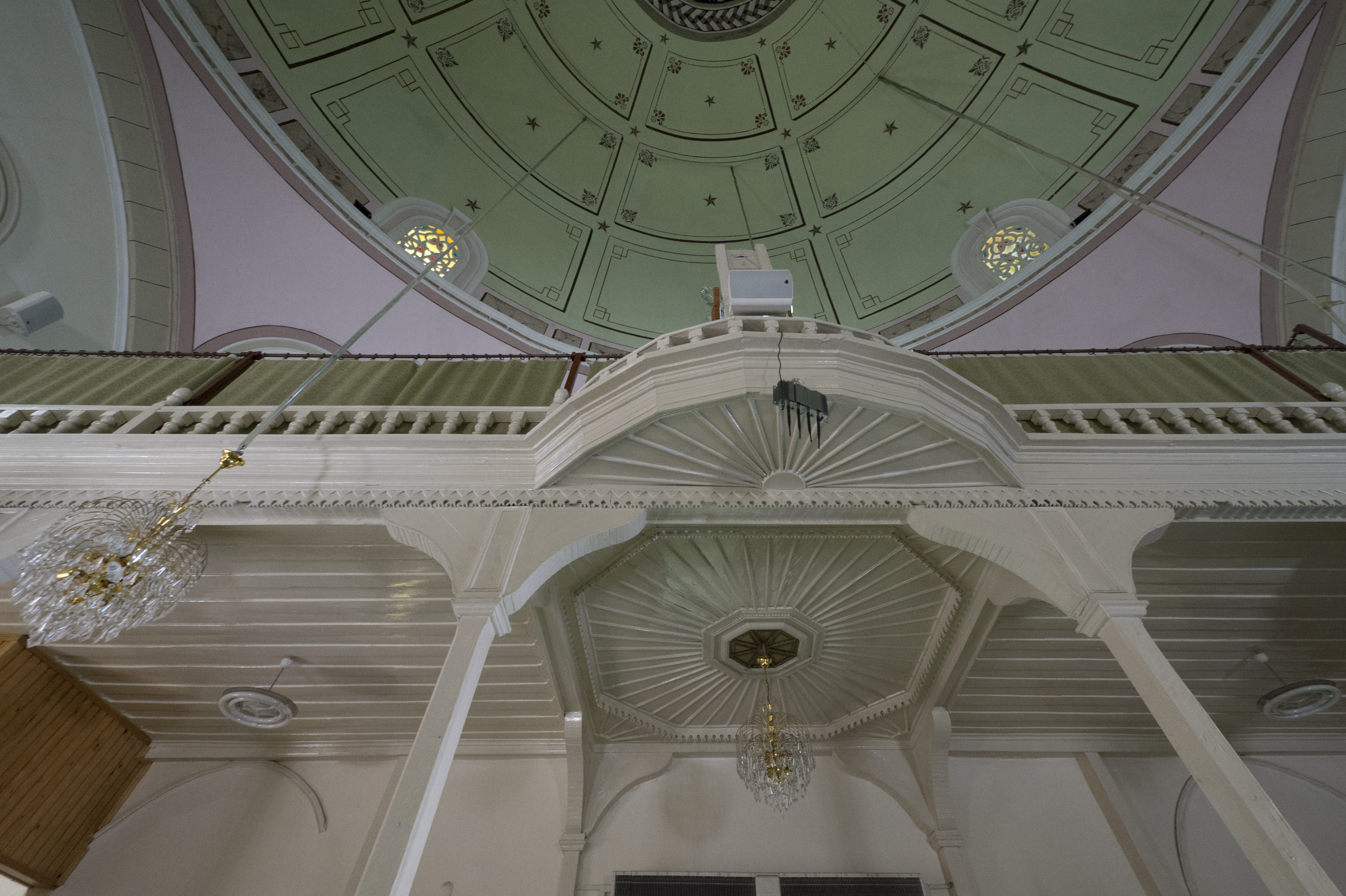
Isparta Mimar Sinan (Firdevs Paşa) Cami

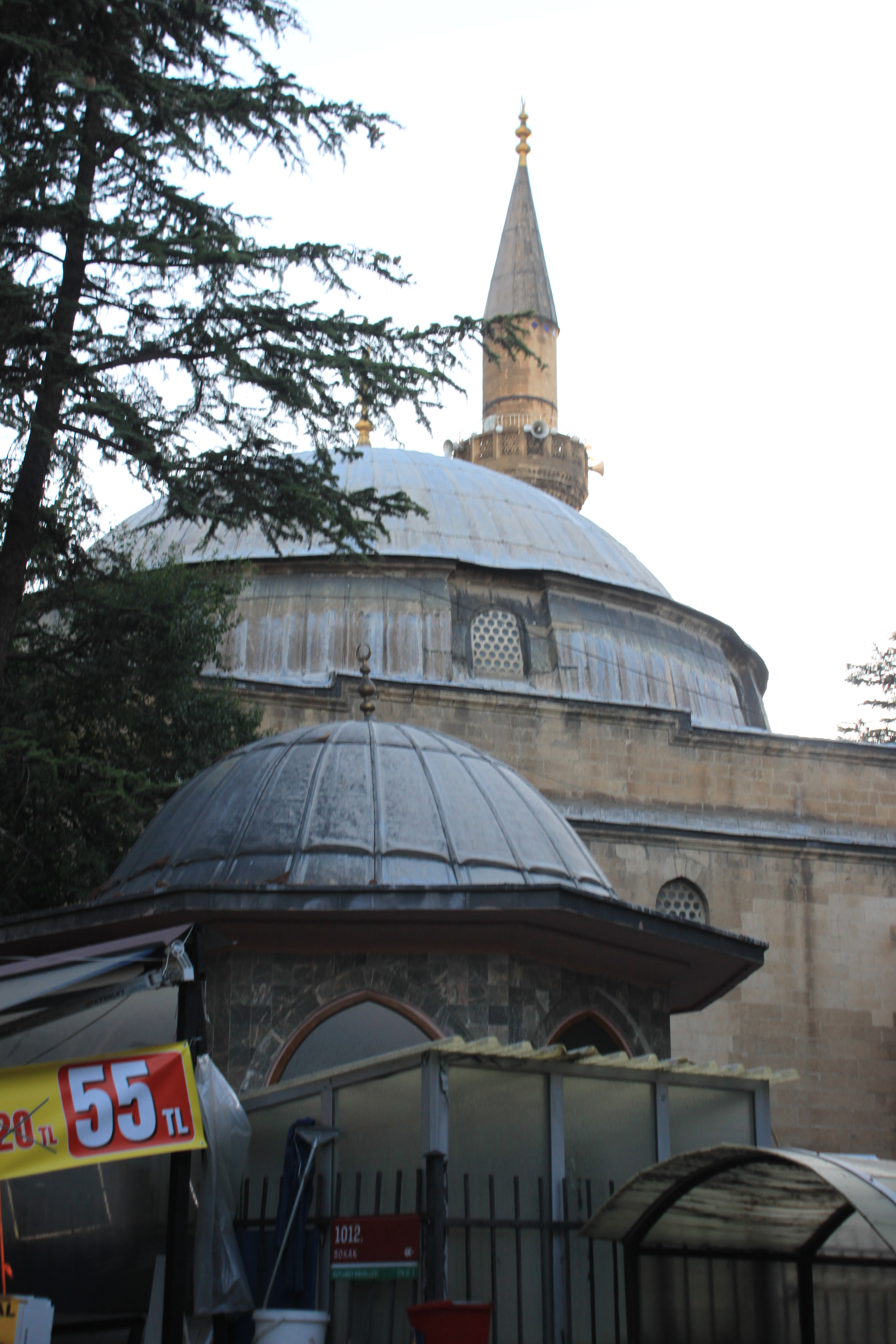
Isparta; Firdevs Paşa Camiye von Süd

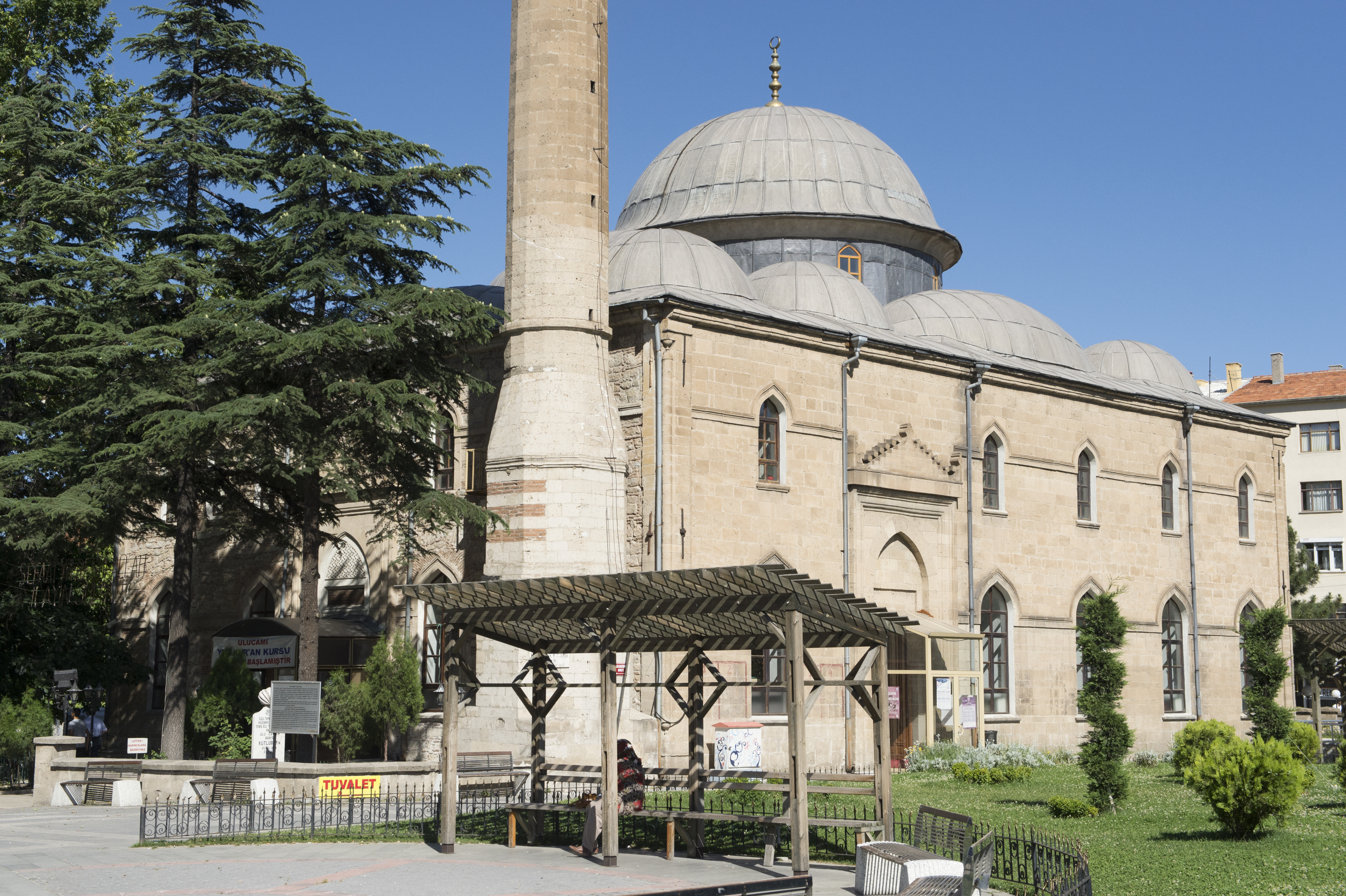
Isparta Kutlu Bey Camii aka Ulu Camii

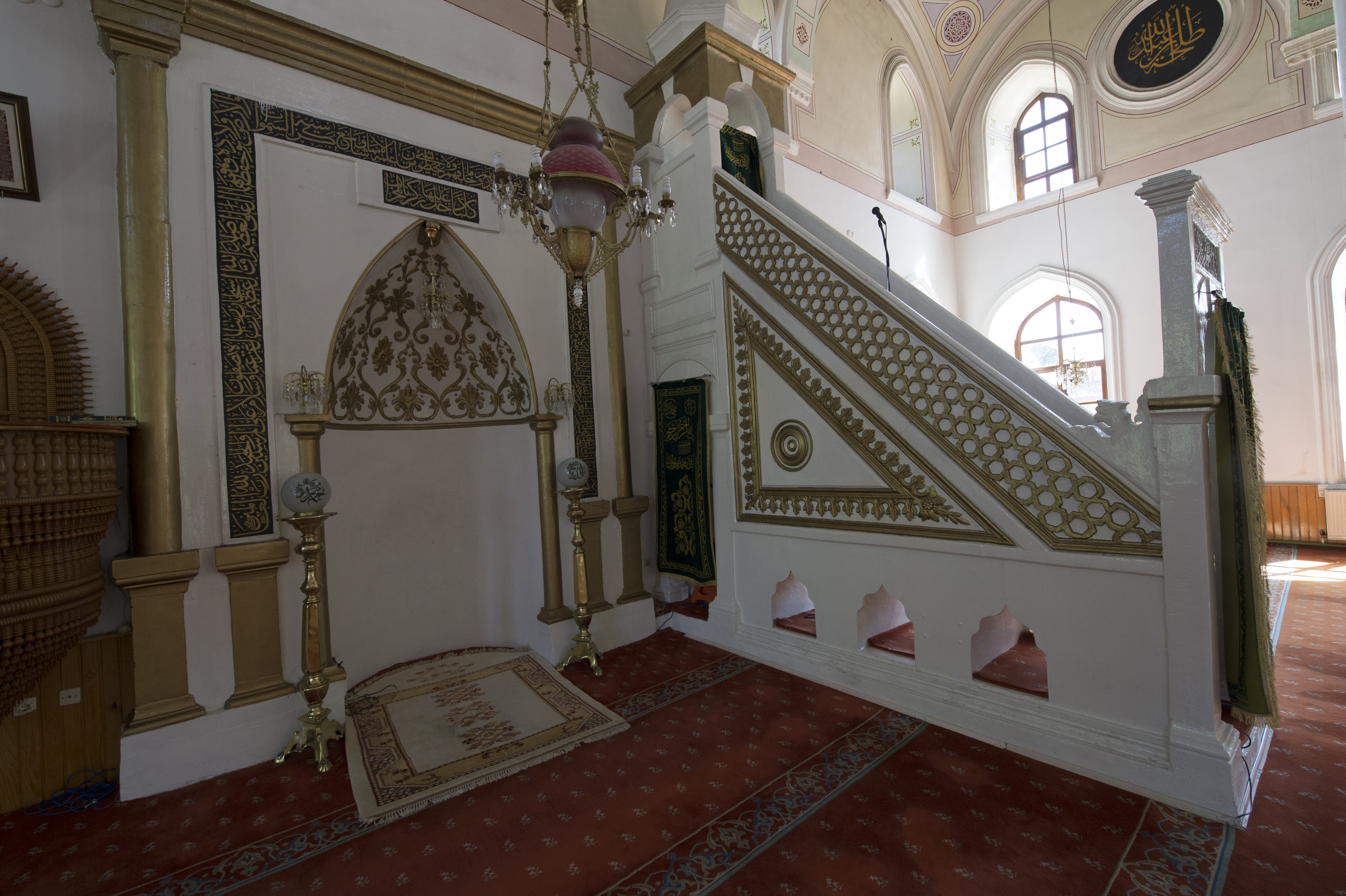
Isparta Kutlu Bey Camii aka Ulu Camii

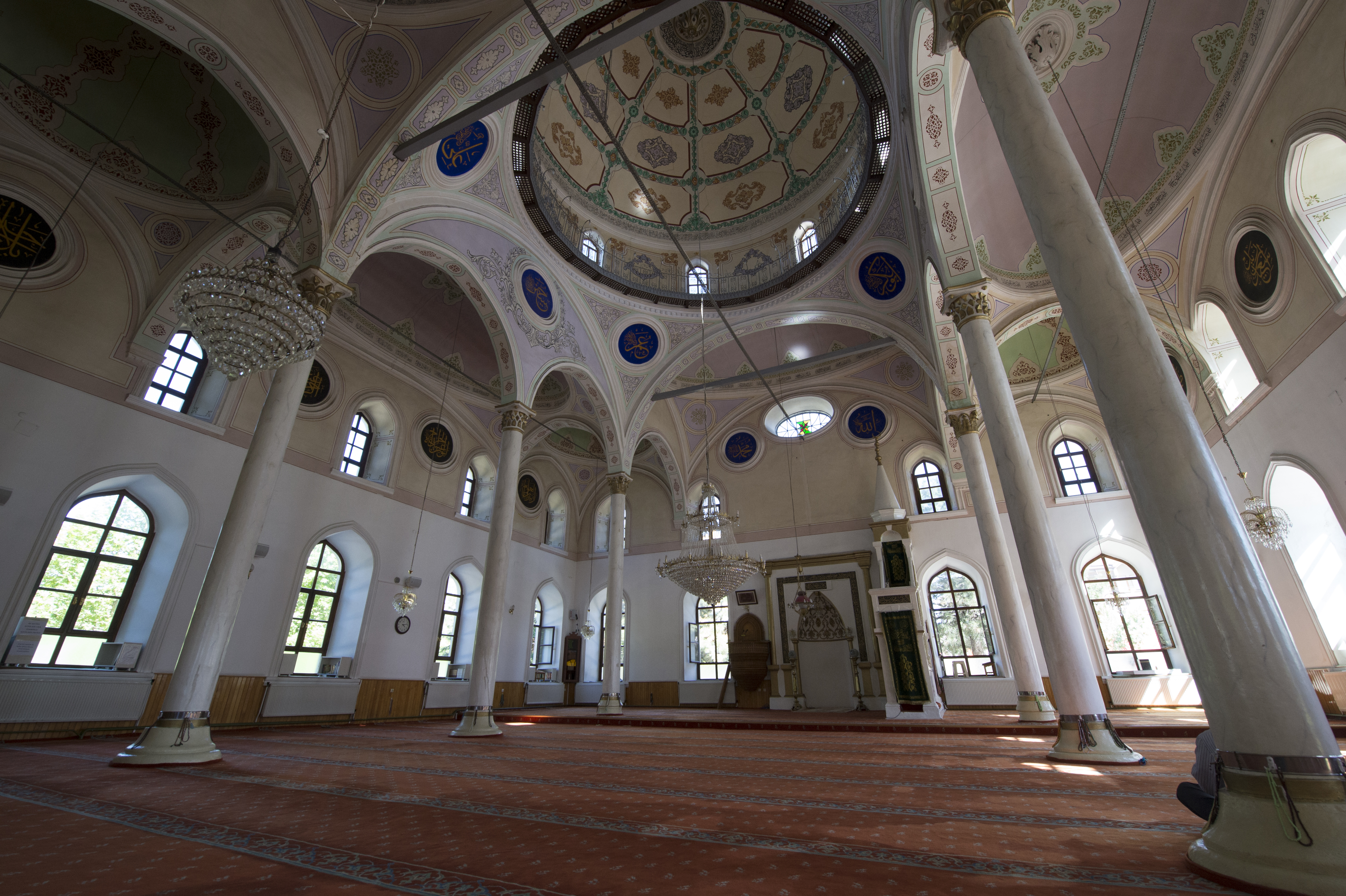
Isparta Kutlu Bey Camii aka Ulu Camii

The city also has a museum.

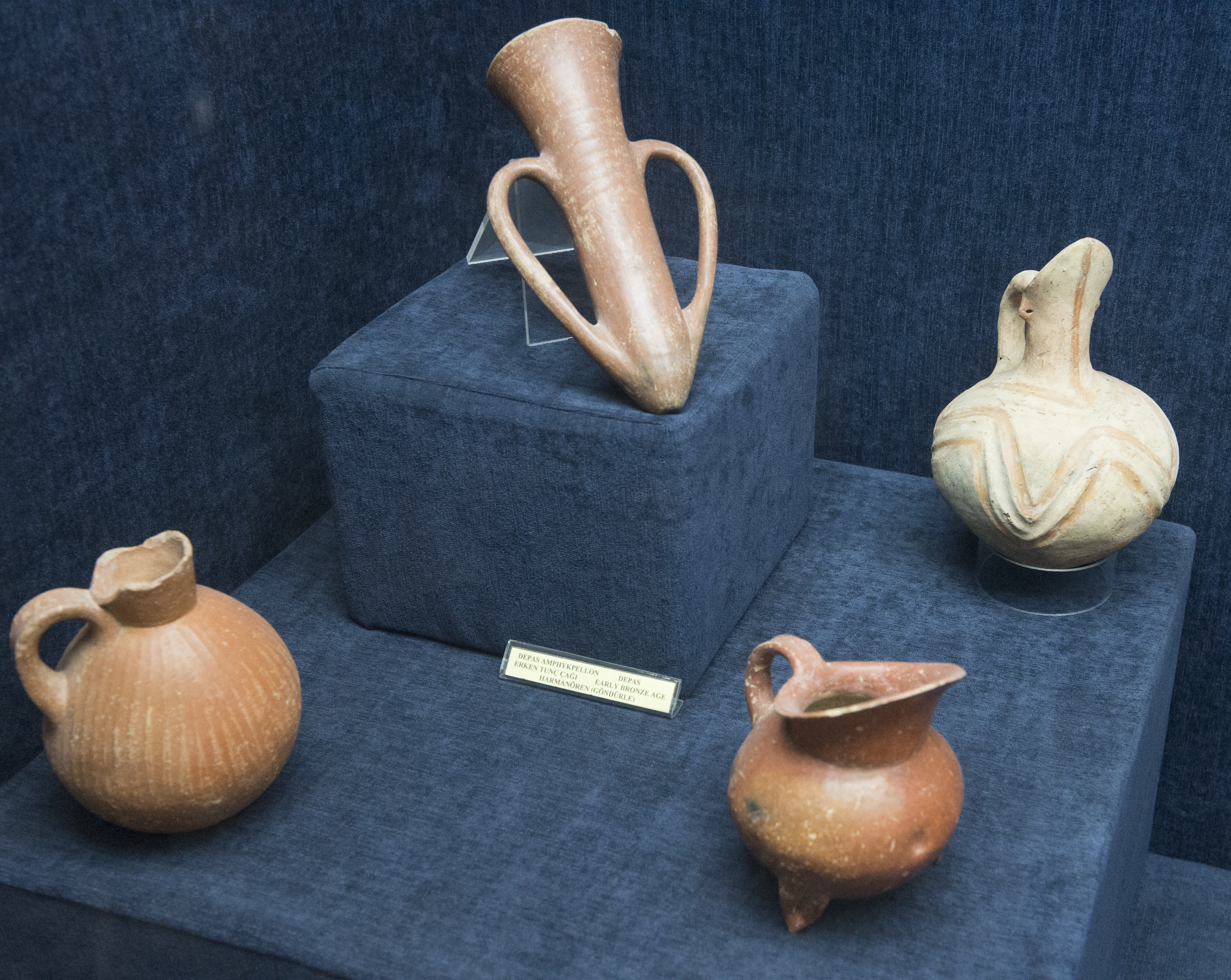
Isparta museum Early Bronze Age vessels

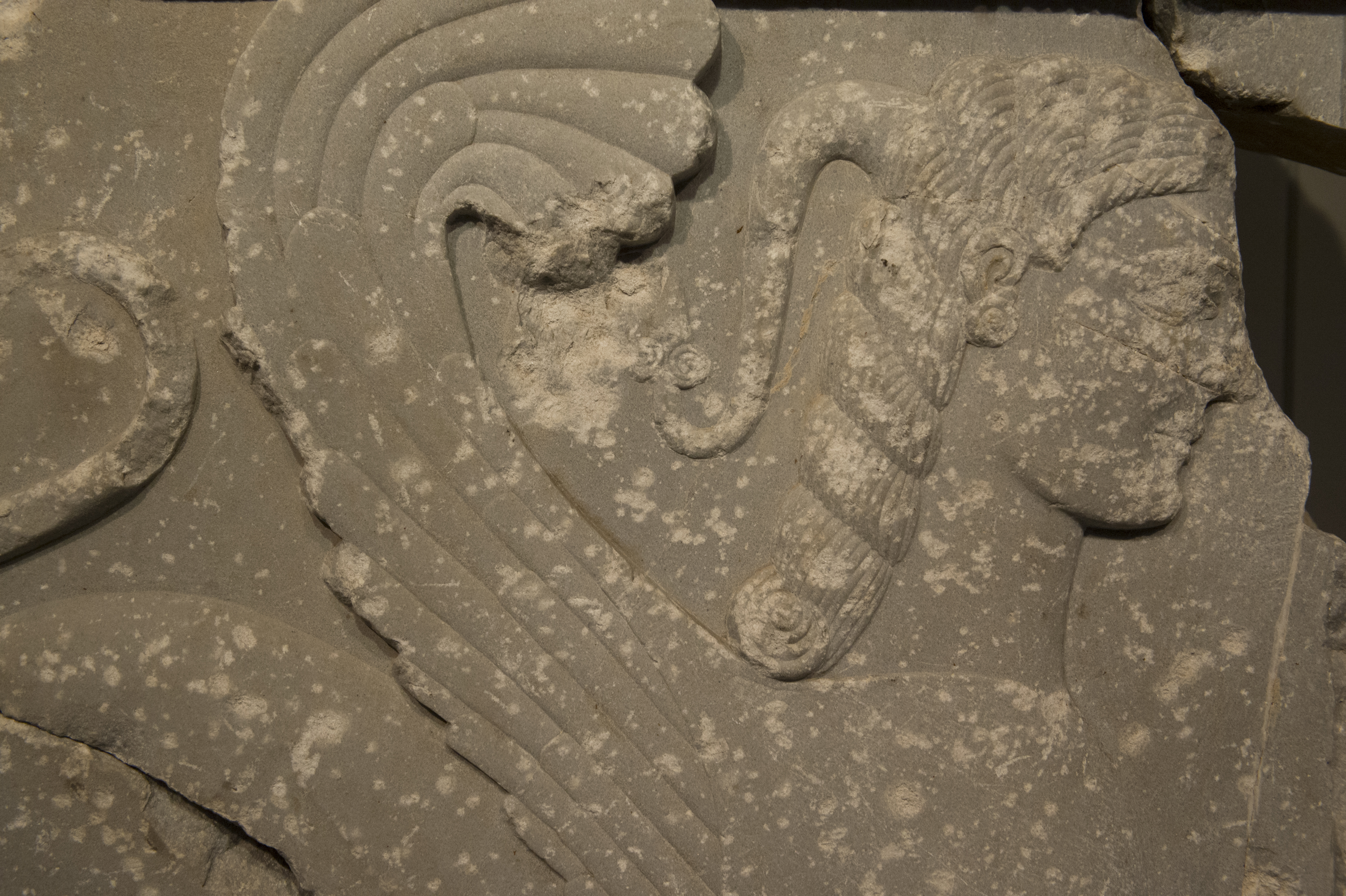
Isparta museum Late Archaic stele

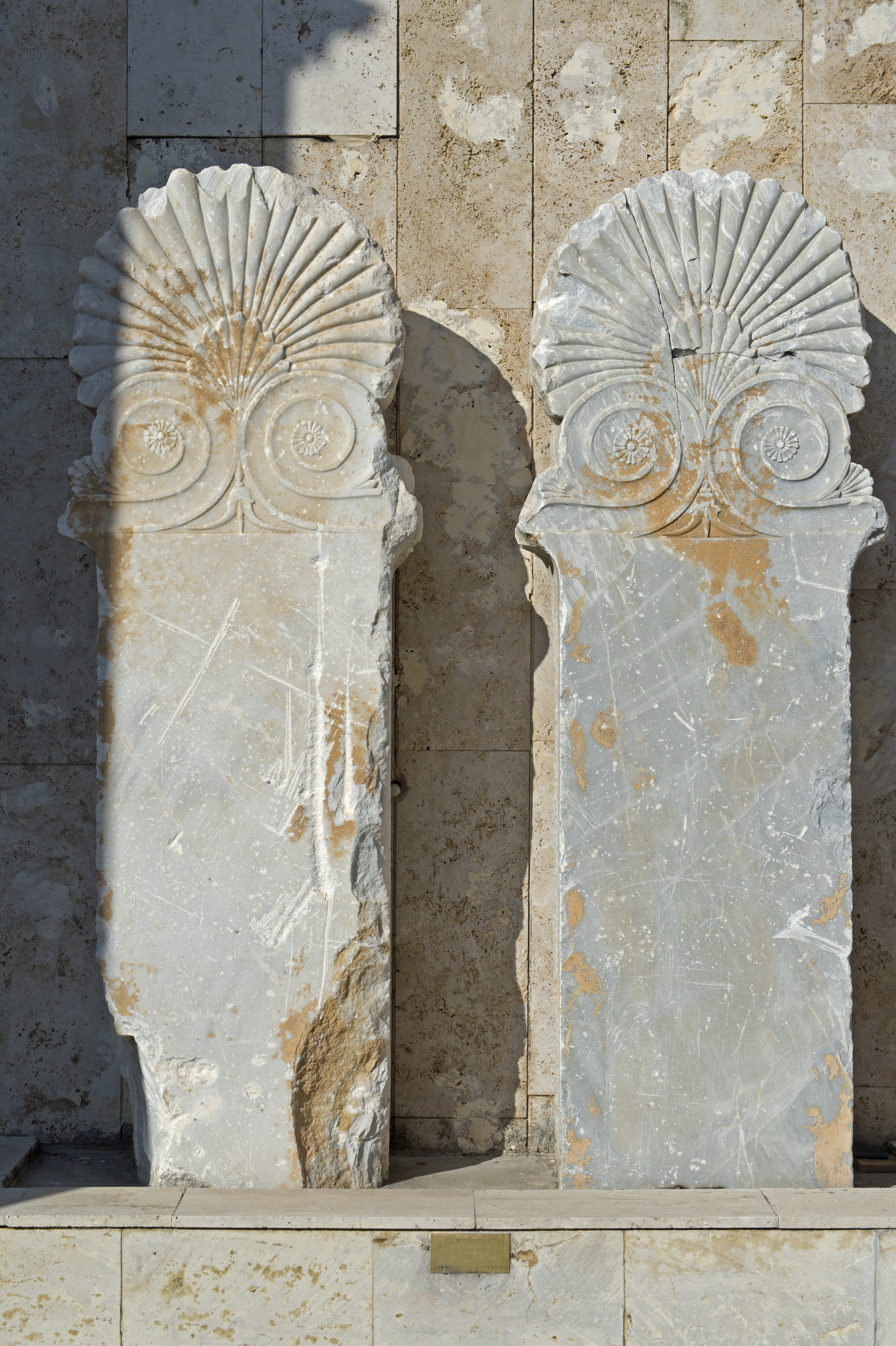
Isparta museum Late Archaic steles

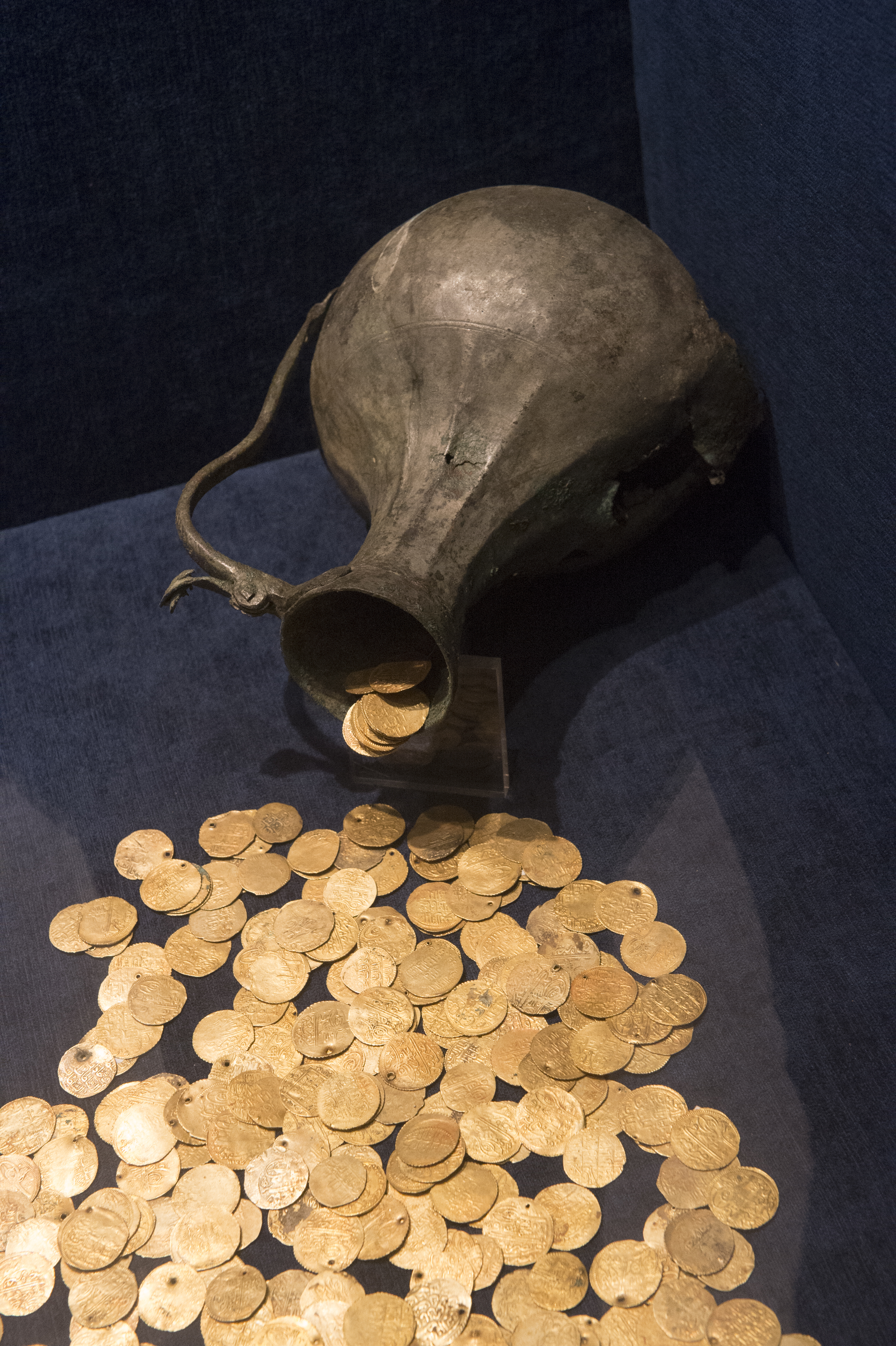
Isparta museum Eğirdir treasure

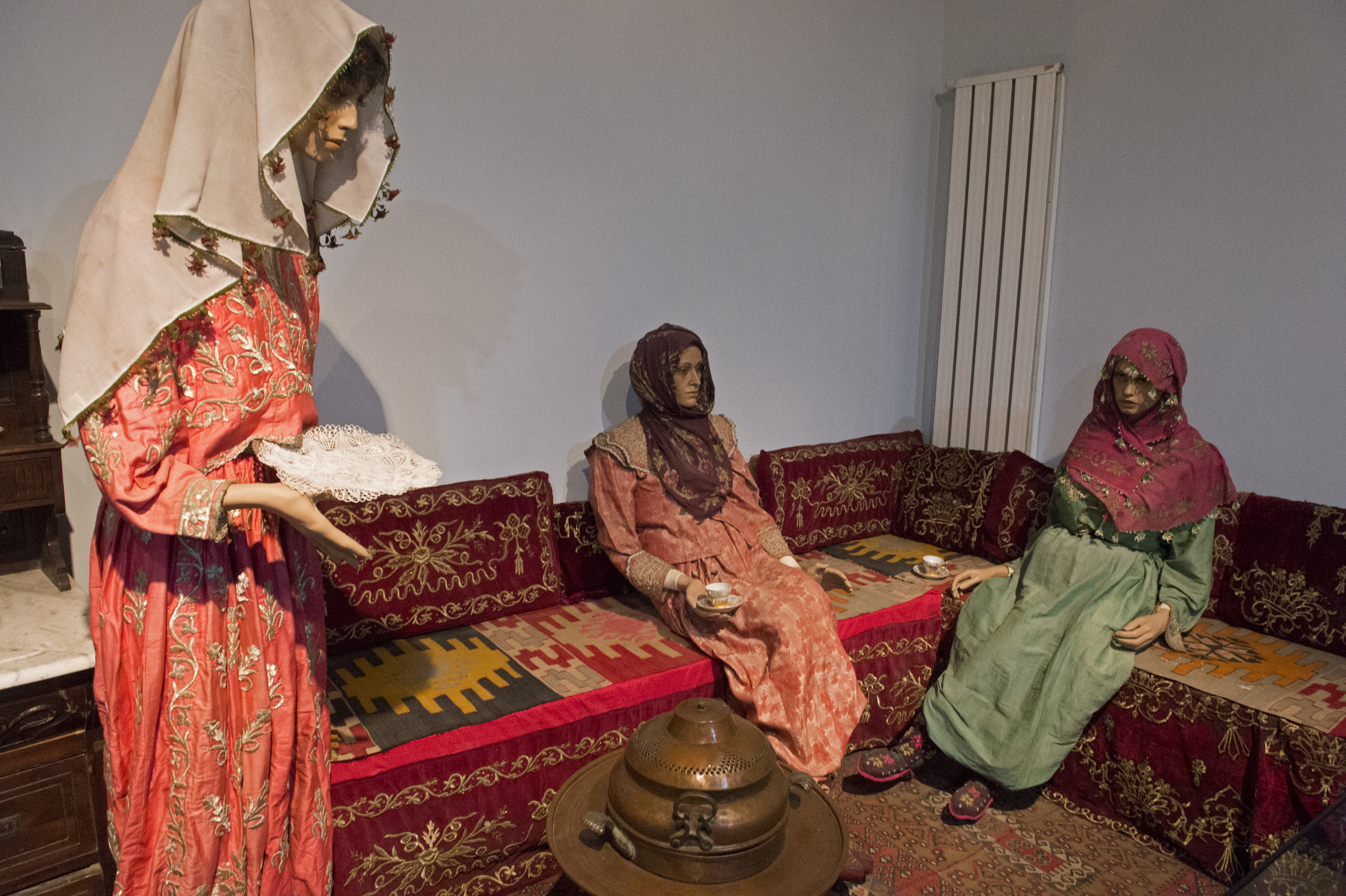
Isparta museum Anatolian dresses

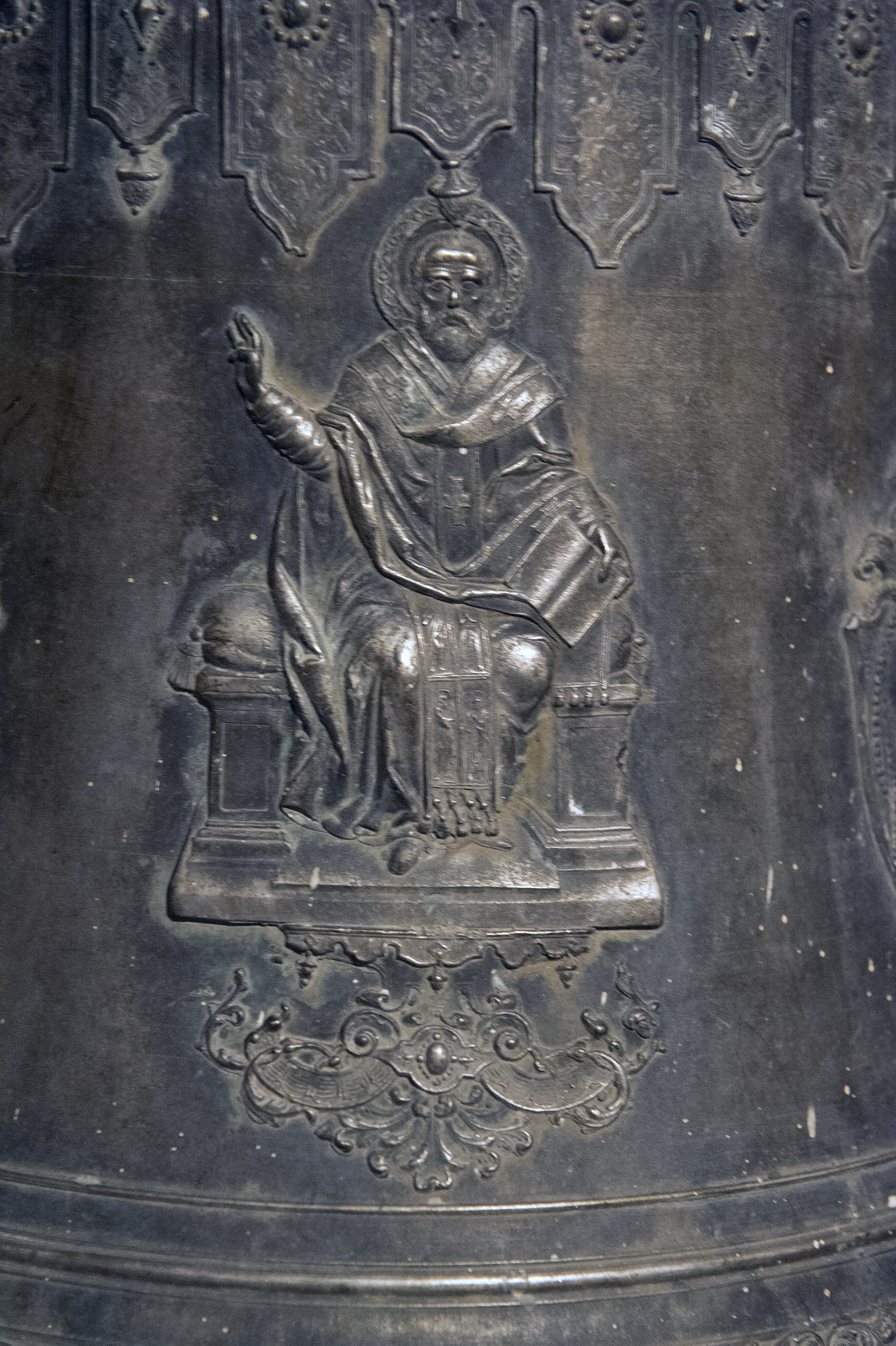
Isparta museum church bell

Other sights include:

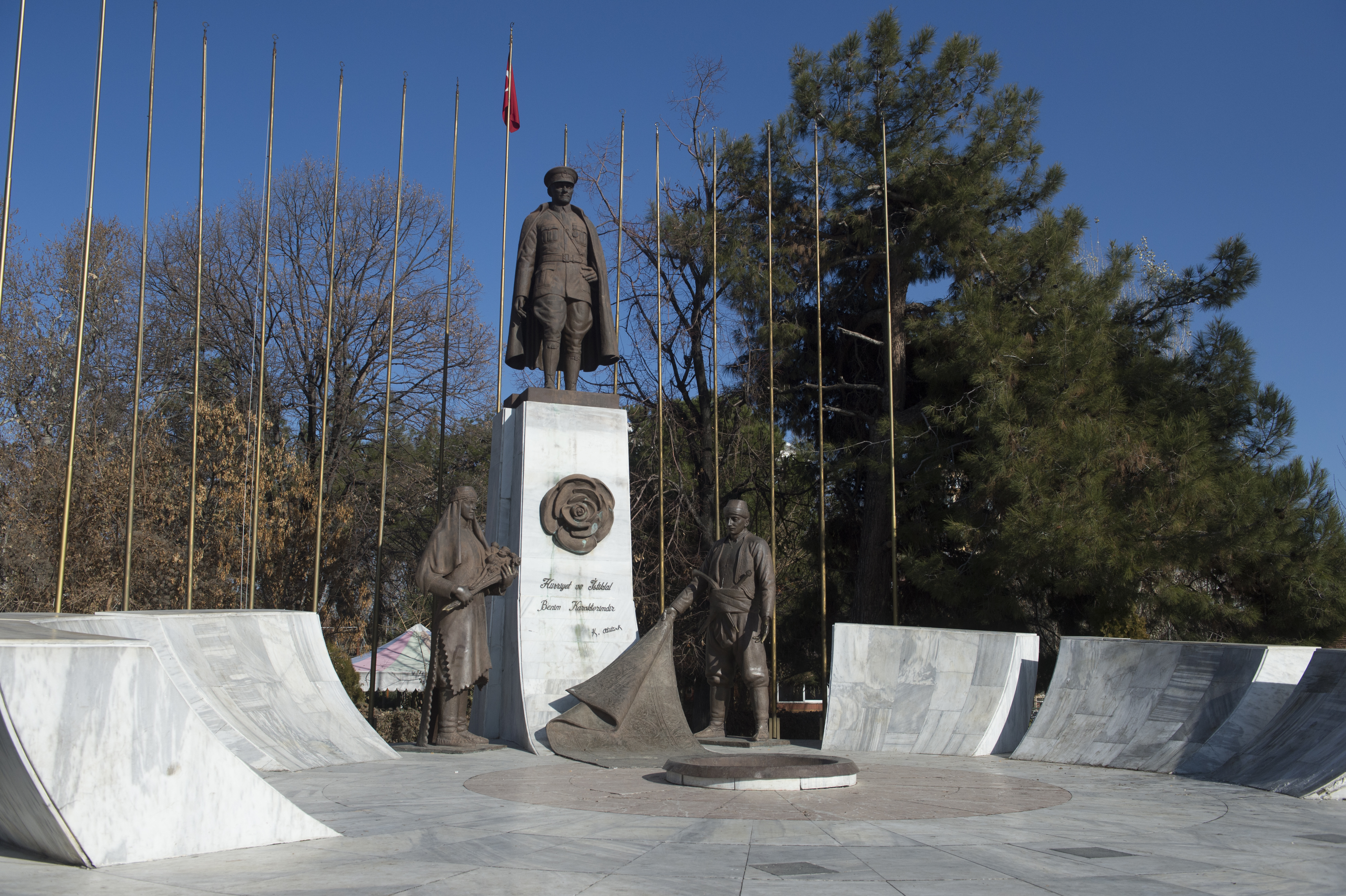
Isparta Atatürk monument

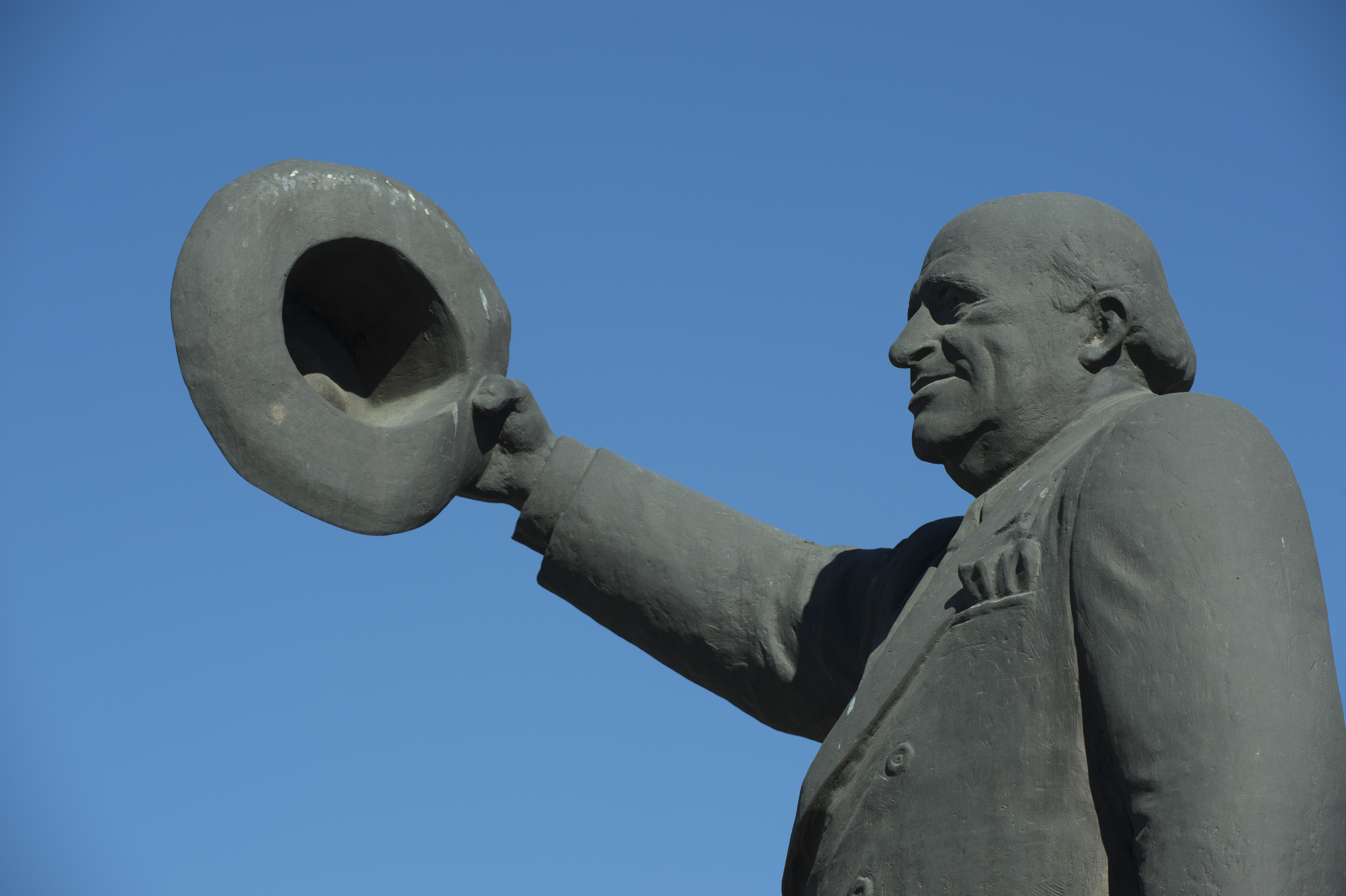
Süleyman Demirel Heykeli

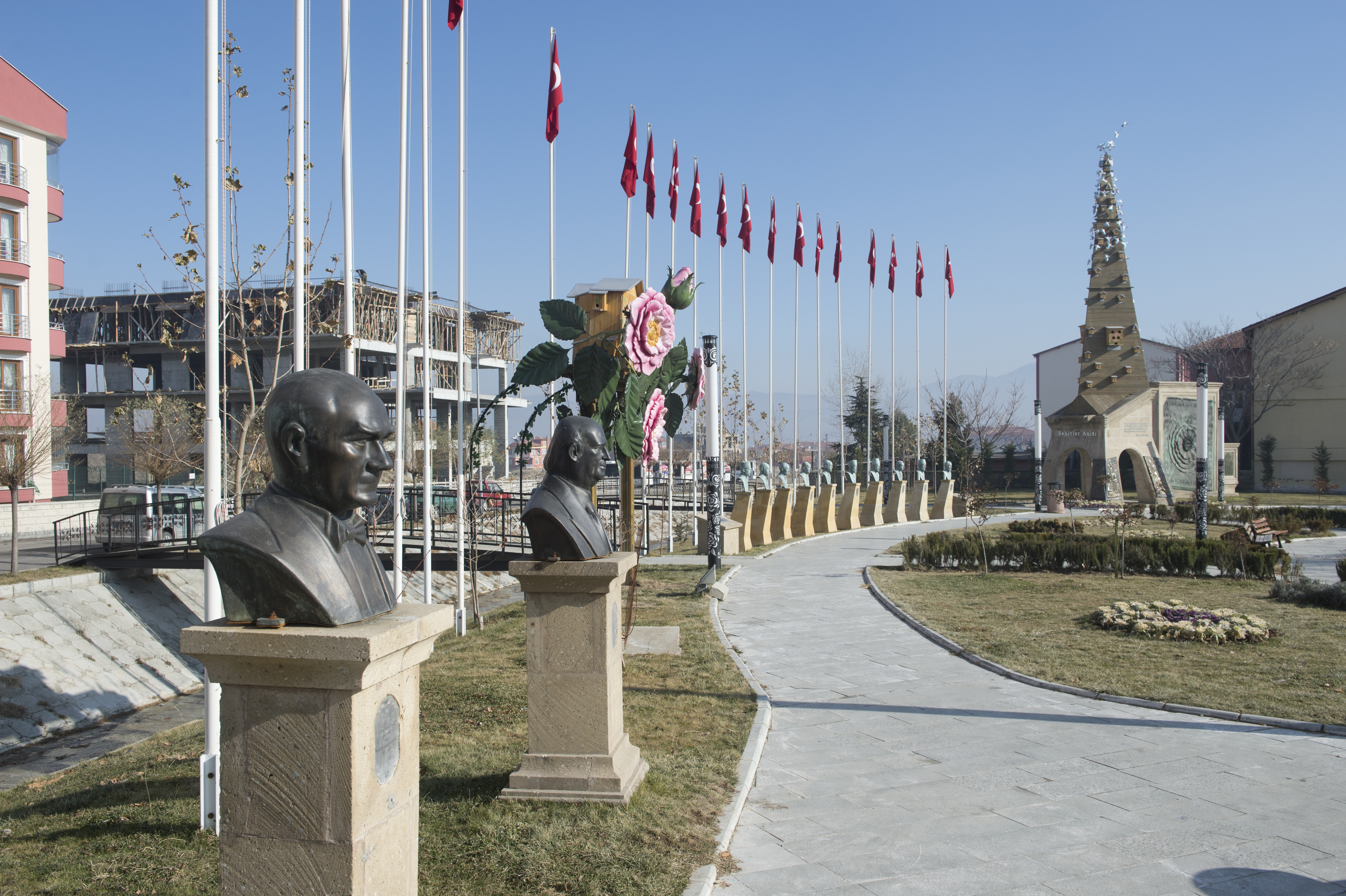
Isparta Şehitler Parkı

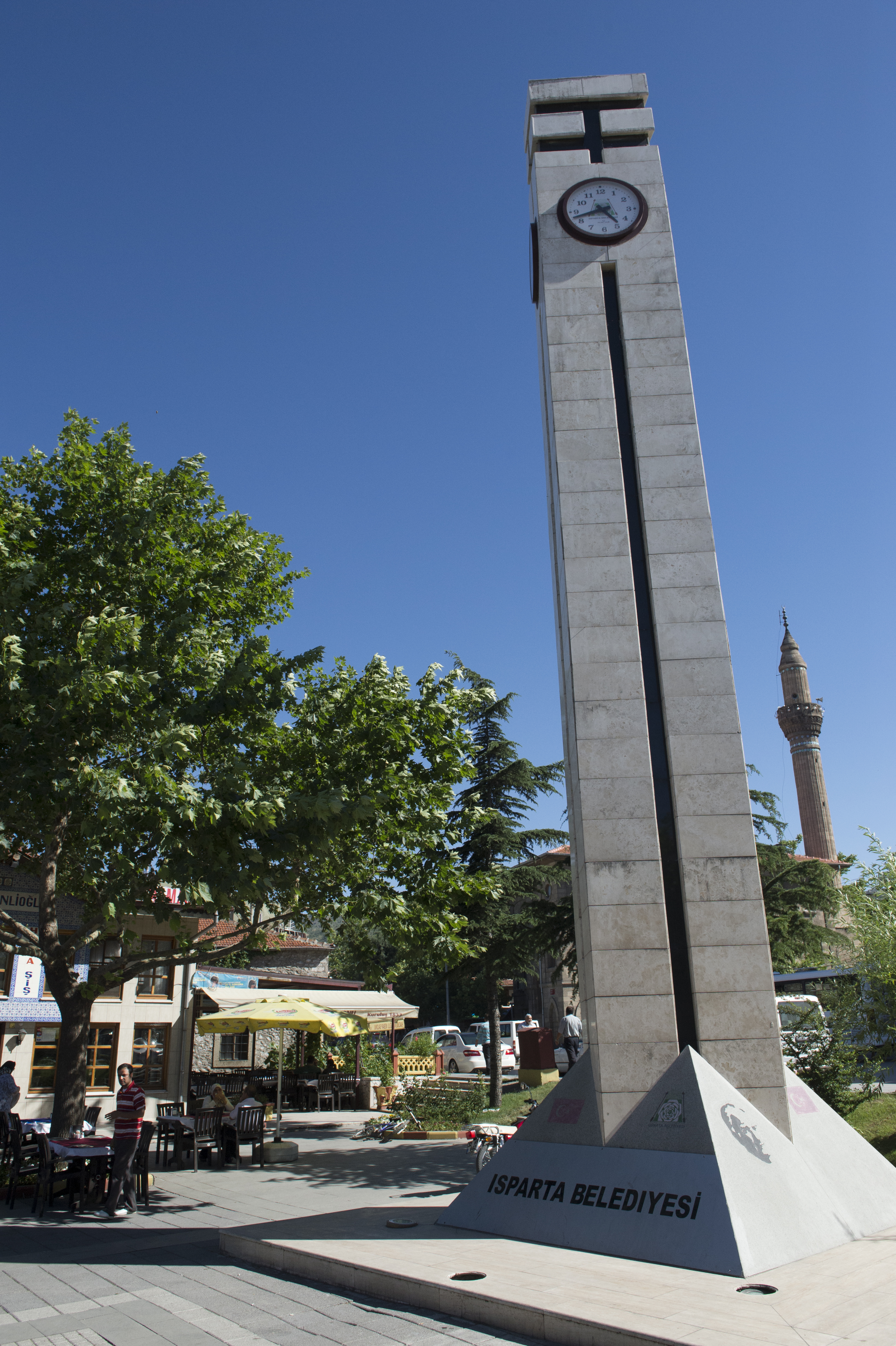
Isparta Clocktower

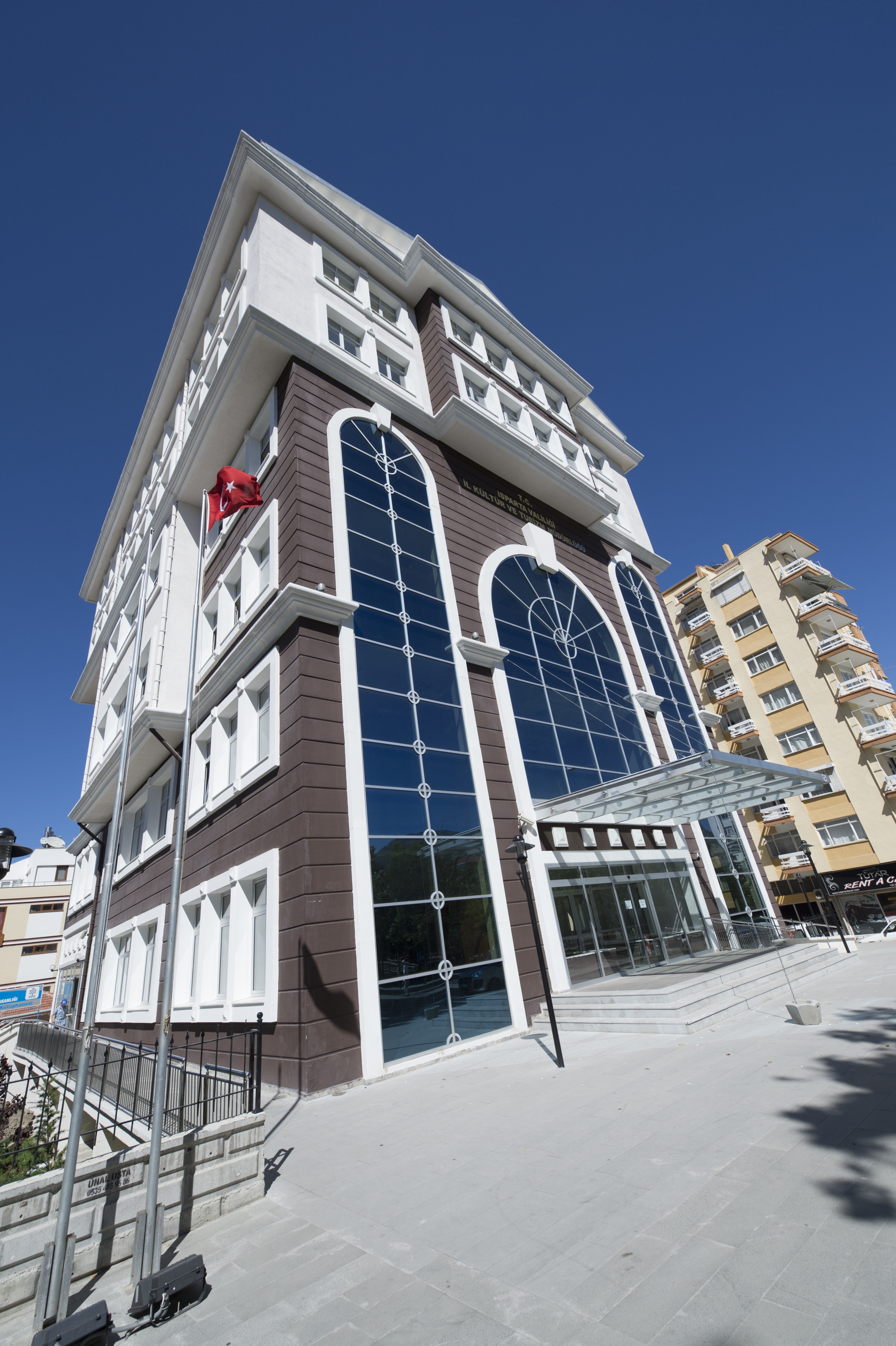
Isparta Culture and Tourism building

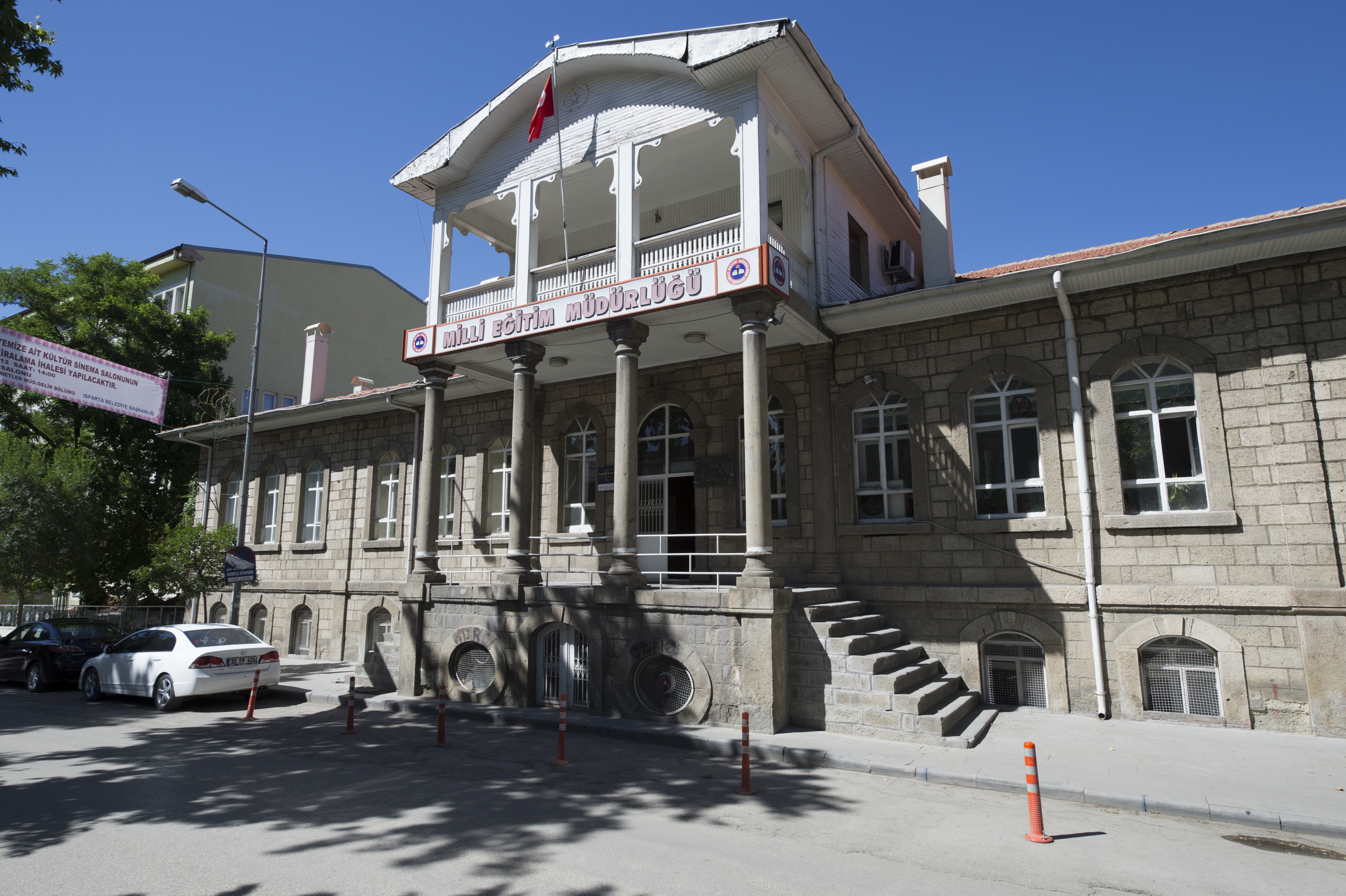
Isparta Provincial Directorate of National Education

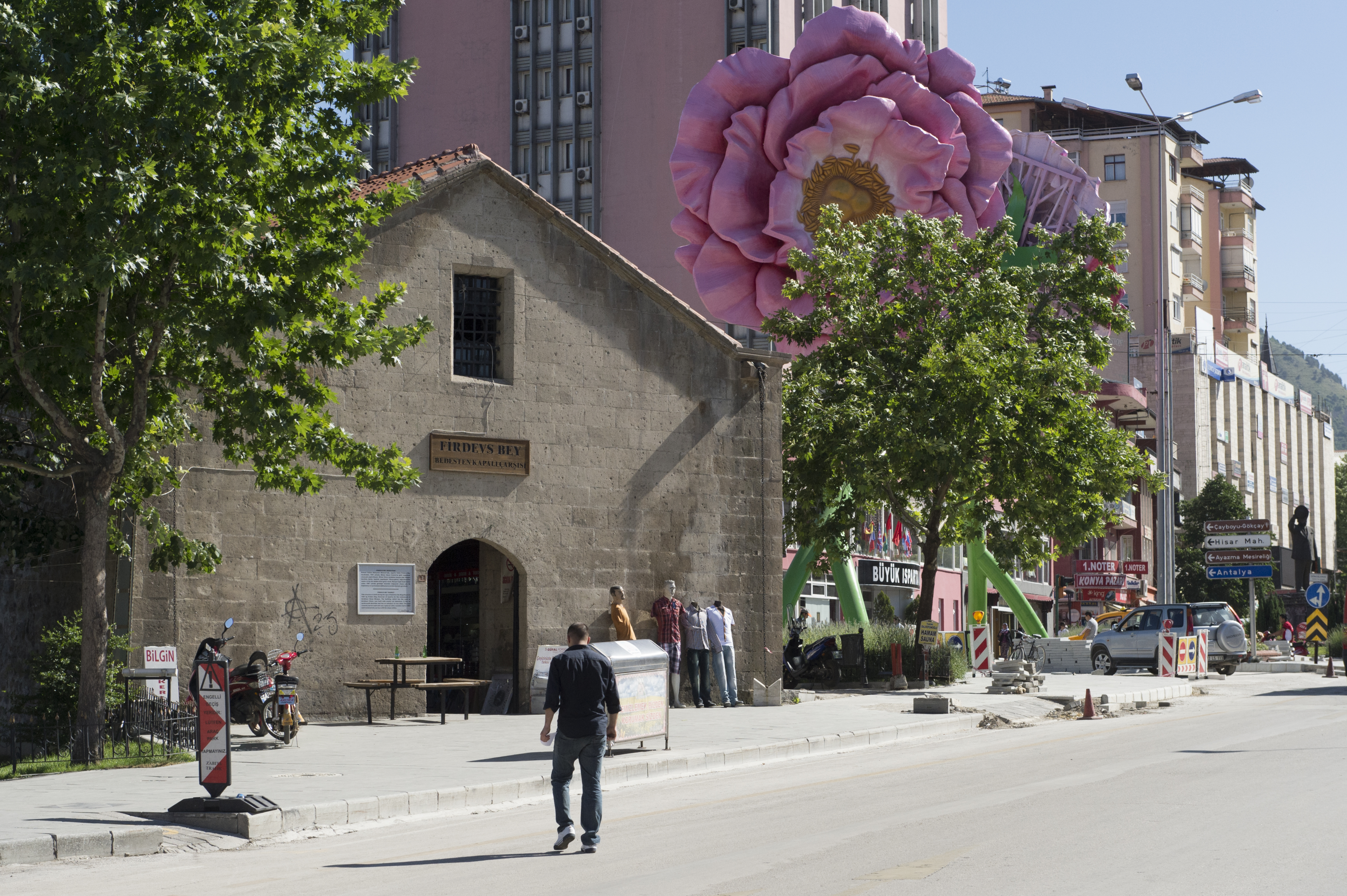
Isparta Firdevs Bey Bedesteni

== Notable people ==
- Aylin Cesur, doctor and politician
- Erkan Mumcu, politician and the former of Minister of National Education, Minister of Culture and Tourism (Turkey)
- Süleyman Demirel, former prime minister of Turkey and president of Turkey, was born in the village of Islamköy close to Isparta
- Cahit Berkay, musician
- Zeki Demirkubuz, He is a Turkish director, screenwriter, and actor, internationally recognized for Masumiyet and films such as Üçüncü Sayfa, Yazgı, İtiraf, and Kader.

== Mayors of Isparta ==
- 1984-1980 Dogan Kımıllı AP
- 1980-1984 Müslim Sevgi
- 1984-1989 Ziya Zeynelgil ANAP
- 1989-1994 Altan Raşit Civan DYP, Refah Party
- 1994-1999 Mehmet Aybatılı DYP
- 1999-2004 and 2009-2019 Yusuf Ziya Günaydın MHP
- 2004-2009 Hasan Balaman AK Party
- 2019-present Şükrü Başdeğirmen AK Party

== Twin towns – sister cities ==
Isparta is twinned with:

- Hamadan, Iran
- Burdur, Turkey

== See also ==
- Anatolian Tigers
- Borani
- Lake Gölcük

== Sources and external links ==
- Hunt for clues in Turkish crash
- Isparta City Portal – All about Isparta
- GCatholic – (titular) bishopric
