= Fate (2001 film) =

2001 Turkish drama film by Zeki Demirkubuz

Yazgı
- Directed by: Zeki Demirkubuz
- Written by: Zeki Demirkubuz
- Based on: L'Étranger by Albert Camus
- Produced by: Zeki Demirkubuz
- Cinematography: Ali Utku
- Edited by: Zeki Demirkubuz
- Distributed by: Mavi Film, TurkishFilmChannel
- Release date: 9 November 2001
- Running time: 119 minutes
- Country: Turkey
- Language: Turkish

Fate (Turkish: Yazgı) is a 2001 Turkish drama film directed and screen-written by Zeki Demirkubuz based on Albert Camus' 1942 novel L'Étranger. It was screened in the Un Certain Regard section at the 2002 Cannes Film Festival.

== Cast ==
- Emrah Elçiboğa
- Engin Günaydın as Necati
- Demir Karahan as Naim
- Feridun Koç
- Serdar Orçin as Musa
- Zeynep Tokuş as Sinem

Awards
Preceded by Filler ve Çimen	Golden Orange; Behlül Dal Jury Special Award; 2001	Succeeded by Gönlümdeki Köşk Olmasa
