= Isparta District =

District of Isparta Province, Turkey

- District
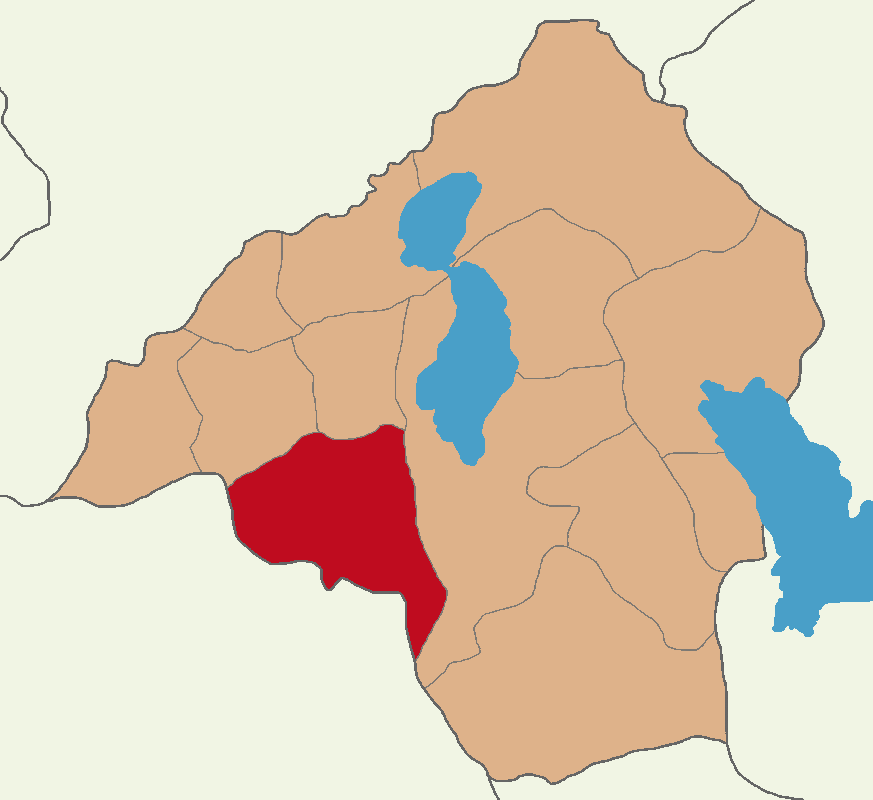
- Map showing Isparta District in Isparta Province

- Location in Turkey
- Coordinates: 37°46′N 30°33′E
- Country: Turkey
- Province: Isparta
- Seat: Isparta
- Area: 773 km^{2} (298 sq mi)
- Population (2022): 268,595
  - Density: 347/km^{2} (900/sq mi)
- Time zone: UTC+3 (TRT)

Isparta District (also: Merkez, meaning "central" in Turkish) is a district of the Isparta Province of Turkey. Its seat is the city of Isparta. Its area is 773 km^{2}, and its population is 268,595 (2022).

== Composition ==
There are three municipalities in Isparta District:

- Isparta
- Kuleönü
- Savköy

There are 20 villages in Isparta District:

- Aliköy
- Bozanönü
- Büyükgökçeli
- Büyükhacılar
- Çobanisa
- Çukurköy
- Darıderesi
- Darıören
- Deregümü
- Direkli
- Gelincik
- Güneyce
- Kadılar
- Kayıköy
- Kışlaköy
- Küçük Gökçeli
- Küçük Kışla
- Küçükhacılar
- Yakaören
- Yazısöğüt
