= Savköy =

- Municipality
- Location in Turkey
- Coordinates: 37°46′N 30°39′E
- Country: Turkey
- Province: Isparta
- District: Isparta
- Elevation: 1,005 m (3,297 ft)
- Population (2022): 3,664
- Time zone: UTC+3 (TRT)
- Postal code: 32120
- Area code: 0246

Savköy (also: Sav) is a town (belde) in the Isparta District, Isparta Province, Turkey. Its population is 3,664 (2022).

== Geography ==
Savköy lies to the east of Turkish state highway D.685 which connects Isparta to Antalya at the Mediterranean Sea coast. It is situated in the southern slopes of Davraz Mountains. The distance to Isparta is only 8 kilometres (5.0 mi).

== History ==
Sav was always populated throughout its history. A quarter of Sav named Astepe was probably populated back in the 19th century BC. According to Ottoman Empire documents of 1522, there were 35 houses in Sav. In 1971 Sav was declared a seat of township.

== Economy ==
The main economic sector of the town is vegetable and fruit farming. Köfke taşı, a construction material, is also mined around the town.
