= Başak Köklükaya =

Turkish actress (born 1974)

- Born: 19 April 1974 (age 52); Ankara, Turkey
- Occupation: Actress
- Years active: 1995–present

Başak Köklükaya (born 19 April 1974) is a Turkish actress. She has appeared in more than 20 films and television shows since 1989. She starred in The Confession, which was screened in the Un Certain Regard section at the 2002 Cannes Film Festival.

She played in hit series "Bizimkiler", "Çemberimde Gül Oya", "Yazlıkçılar". She had leading role in hit series "Sultan Makamı", "Esir Şehrin İnsanları", "Yanık Koza". Since 2019 she has played a leading role in all three seasons of the Netflix original fantasy television series Atiye, as Serap Özgürsoy, mother of the main character Atiye.

== Filmography ==
- Atiye
- Fi
- İşe Yarar Bir Şey
- Kül ve Ateş
- Süt
- Küçük Kıyamet
- Organize İşler
- Mustafa Hakkında Her şey
- Bir Tutam Baharat
- Derviş
- Harem Suare
- Hamam
- İtiraf
- Duruşma
- Üçüncü Sayfa
- Mektup
- Yanık Koza
- Uy Başuma Gelenler
- Çemberimde Gül Oya
- Sultan Makamı
- Esir Şehrin İnsanları
- Aşk ve Gurur
- Koltuk Sevdası
- Baykuşların Saltanatı
- Rıza Beyler
- Bizimkiler
- Yazlıkçılar
