= The Long Way Home (2013 film) =

- Theatrical Release Poster
- Directed by: Alphan Eseli
- Written by: Serdar Tantekin; Alphan Eseli
- Produced by: Böcek Yapım; Mars Entertainment Group; Bubi Film; Oğuz Peri
- Starring: Uğur Polat; Nergis Öztürk; Serdar Orçin
- Cinematography: Hayk Kirakosyan
- Edited by: Ömer Özyılmazel
- Music by: Mihály Víg
- Distributed by: UIP
- Release date: March 8, 2013
- Running time: 115 minutes
- Country: Turkey
- Language: Turkish

The Long Way Home (Turkish: Eve Dönüş: Sarıkamış 1915) is a 2013 Turkish drama film directed by Alphan Eseli.

The film won the International Federation of Film Critics' Fipresci Award, the Golden Zenith Award for Best First Fiction Feature film from the 37th Montreal World Film Festival, and the New Talent Award for Best First Feature Film from the Hong Kong Asian Film Festival. Furthermore, The Long Way Home was nominated for the Sutherland Trophy at the 57th BFI London Film Festival.

== Plot ==
The Battle of Sarikamish, an engagement between the Russian and Ottoman Empire during World War I, resulted in the defeat of the Ottomans. Eastern Anatolia had become a place of uncertainty and chaos by January 1915, and neither the Russians nor the Ottomans held control. Due to absence of authority, the people were left to their own fate in a battle of survival.

Saci Efendi, who is an officer in the Ottoman Foreign Ministry, accompanies Gul Hanim, the wife of the Ministry's Principal Clerk, and her daughter, Nihan, on their way to Erzurum. They try to find their way in the terrible winter. On their first night in this remote and deserted village, they realize that they are not alone. Passing through a deserted village in the mountains of East Anatolia, 7 people from different walks of life try to endure the terrible winter conditions as well as starvation while attempting to make their way back to home.

== Cast ==
- Uğur Polat - Saci Bey
- Nergis Öztürk - Gül Hanim
- Serdar Orçin - Onbasi Sami
- Muharrem Bayrak - Çoban Ali
- Şevket Süha Tezel - Er Mahmut
- Sıla Çetindağ - Zeynep

=== Music ===
The score of the film was composed by Hungarian musician Mihály Víg - known for his collaborations with director Béla Tarr on films including The Turin House and Werckmeister Harmonies.

== See also ==
- 2013 in film
- Turkish films of 2013
- Sarıkamış
- Battle of Sarikamish
