= Serdar Orçin =

Turkish actor (born 1976)

- Born: 21 January 1976 (age 50); Bayburt, Turkey
- Occupation: Actor
- Years active: 1996–present
- Spouse: Ece Dizdar (m. 2025)

Serdar Orçin (born 21 January 1976) is a Turkish actor. He has appeared in more than thirty films since 1999.

== Theatre ==
- Kadı (Ülkü Tamer) Istanbul State Theatre, 1996
- Fil Hamdi (Aziz Nesin) MSM Oyuncuları, 1997
- They Shoot Horses, Don't They? (Horace McCoy) 1997
- Sihirli Kitap (Nesrin Kazankaya)
- Sokağa Çıkma Yasağı (Civan Canova) Istanbul City Theatres, 1997
- Hababam Sınıfı (Rıfat Ilgaz) Istanbul City Theatres, 1998
- İsli Sisli Pis Puslu (Volker Ludwig, Reiner Lücker) Istanbul City Theatres, 1998
- Düşler Sirki Başlıyooor (Ümran İnceoğlu) Istanbul City Theatres, 1998
- Çevreci Prens (Fikret Yayan) Istanbul City Theatres, 1999
- Atatürk ve Çocuk, 1999
- The Wonderful Wizard of Oz (L. Frank Baum) MSM Oyuncuları, 2000
- Sabaha Az Kala (Neşe Erçetin Atakan) Istanbul City Theatres, 2000
- Barışa Şans Verin (Can Doğan) Istanbul City Theatres, 2000
- The Caucasian Chalk Circle (Bertolt Brecht) Istanbul City Theatres, 2000
- The Private Ear (Peter Shaffer) Hadi Çaman Theatre, 2001
- Schweik in the Second World War (Bertolt Brecht) Istanbul City Theatres, 2001
- Othello (William Shakespeare) Istanbul City Theatres, 2002
- Richard III (William Shakespeare) Istanbul City Theatres, 2003
- Candan Can Koparmak (Orhan Asena) Istanbul City Theatres, 2004
- Kantocu (Haldun Dormen) İstanbul Şehir Tiyatroları, 2005
- The Luxurious Life (Ekrem Reşit Rey, Cemal Reşit Rey) Istanbul City Theatres, 2005
- Hastasıyız (Saygın Delibaş, Fethi Kantarcı) Istanbul Kraliyet Theatre, 2007
- Keşanlı Ali Destanı (Haldun Taner) Istanbul City Theatres, 2008
- Ara (Çetin Sarıkartal) Kronik Kolektif
- Masked (Ilan Hatsor) Istanbul City Theatres, 2009
- Mephisto (Klaus Mann) Istanbul City Theatres, 2009
- Alemdar / Tohum ve Toprak (Orhan Asena) Tiyatro İstanbul, 2011
- Kösem Sultan (Turan Oflazoğlu) Istanbul City Theatres, 2013
- Twelve Angry Men (Reginald Rose) Istanbul City Theatres, 2014
- The Lower Depths (Maxim Gorky) Istanbul City Theatres, 2015
- The Seagull (Anton Chekhov) Pürtelaş Theatre, 2017
- True West (Sam Shepard) Istanbul City Theatres, 2019

== Filmography ==
Year	Title	Role	Notes
1999	Üçüncü Sayfa	Homeowner's son	
2000	Artık Çok Geç	Karslı	TV film
2000	Köçek	Recep	TV film
2001	Yazgı	Musa	
2002	Sır Çocukları	Ziya	
2002	Gülbeyaz	Tahir Demiroğlu	TV series
2002	Abdülhamid Düşerken	Mustafa Kemal	
2003	Mühürlü Güller	Esat	TV series
2003	Bekleme Odası	Kerem	
2004	Hayalet	Yusuf	TV series
2005	Gümüş	Onur	TV series
2005	Tombala	İsa	TV film
2005	Yolda / Rüzgâr Geri Getirirse	Sedat	
2006	Turkish Chat		short film
2007	Barda	45	
2008	Ali'nin Sekiz Günü	Ali	
2008	Ölüler		short film
2009	Haneler		TV series
2009	Sonsuz	Selim	
2009	Kıskanmak	Savcı	
2011	Mükemmel Çift	Rafet Dereci	TV series
2011	Devrimden Sonra	Panelist	
2011	Türkan	reporter	
2011	İz - Rêç	Bekir	
2011	10 Adım	Baba	short film
2011	Can	Cemal	
2012	Bu Son Olsun		
2012	Gözetleme Kulesi		voiceover
2012	Musa		short film
2012	Seni Seviyorum Tülsü		short film
2013	Eve Dönüş: Sarıkamış 1915	Onbaşı Sami	
2012–2013	Behzat Ç. Bir Ankara Polisiyesi	Barbaros	TV series
2013	Galip Derviş	Ercan Karcı	TV series
2013	Karnaval	Ali Sinan (Aliş)	
2014	Muhteşem Yüzyıl	Sinan Pasha	TV series
2014	İtirazım Var	Ferdi Temir	
2015	Beş Kardeş	Kudret	TV series
2014	Ulan İstanbul	Rıfat Kulunç	TV series
2015	Sen de Gitme	Alper	TV series
2016	Oyunbozan	Adnan	TV series
2017	Söz Uçar		short film
2017	Kayıtdışı		TV series
2017	Eşkıya Dünyaya Hükümdar Olmaz	Mert	TV series
2017	Kılçık	waiter	short film
2018	Mehmed: Bir Cihan Fatihi	Demetrios Palaiologos	TV series
2018	Borç	Tufan	
2018	Dünya 2222	Erkek	short film
2019	Görülmüştür		
2019	Uzun Zaman Önce		
2020	İki Gözüm Ahmet		
2020	Ceviz Ağacı	Hayati	
2021	Hamlet	Kerem	web series
2021–2022	Çember	Superintendent Kenan	TV film series
2021	Sen Ben Lenin	Fikret	
2022	Anka		
2022	Alef: Mâl-i Hülya	Melih	web series
2023	Yargı	Prosecutor	TV series
2023	Kısmet	Reis	TV series
2023–2024	Yabani	Metin Arkan	TV series
2023–	Prens	Uncle Kalesh	web series
2024	İlk ve Son		web series
2024	Bildiğin Gibi Değil	Tahsin	

== Awards ==
- 2001, Contemporary Cinema Actors Association "Special Jury Prize" Yazgı (film, 2001)
- 2001, Ankara Film Festival "Promising New Actor" Yazgı (film, 2001)
- 2001, Antalya Golden Orange Film Festival "Special Jury Prize" Yazgı (film, 2001)
- 2002, 7th Sadri Alışık Theatre and Cinema Awards "Promising Actor" Yazgı (film, 2001)
- 2009, 13th Afife Theatre Awards "Best Actor in a Supporting Role" Masked (play, 2009)
- 2013, 4th Malatya International Film Festival "Best Actor" Eve Dönüş: Sarıkamış 1915 (film, 2013)
- 2014, 19th Sadri Alışık Theatre and Cinema Awards "Best Actor" Eve Dönüş: Sarıkamış 1915 (film, 2013)
- 2015, 10th Kemal Sunal Culture and Arts Awards "Best Stage Actor of the Year" Twelve Angry Men (play, 2014)
- 2019, 24th Sadri Alışık Theatre and Cinema Awards "Best Actor" Borç (film, 2018)
- 2020, 31st Ankara Film Festival "Best Actor" Uzun Zaman Önce (film, 2019)
- 2020, 27th International Adana Golden Boll Film Festival "Best Actor" Ceviz Ağacı (film, 2020)
