= Kuleönü =

- Municipality
- Location in Turkey
- Coordinates: 37°52′19″N 30°37′05″E
- Country: Turkey
- Province: Isparta
- District: Isparta
- Population (2022): 2,544
- Time zone: UTC+3 (TRT)

Kuleönü is a town (belde) in the Isparta District, Isparta Province, Turkey. Its population is 2,544 (2022).
