= The Confession (2002 film) =

2002 film

- Film poster
- Directed by: Zeki Demirkubuz
- Written by: Zeki Demirkubuz
- Produced by: Zeki Demirkubuz
- Starring: Taner Birsel
- Cinematography: Zeki Demirkubuz
- Edited by: Zeki Demirkubuz
- Distributed by: TurkishFilmChannel
- Release date: 3 May 2002
- Running time: 100 minutes
- Country: Turkey
- Language: Turkish

The Confession (Turkish: İtiraf) is a 2002 Turkish drama film directed by Zeki Demirkubuz. It was screened in the Un Certain Regard section at the 2002 Cannes Film Festival.

== Cast ==
- Taner Birsel - Harun
- Başak Köklükaya - Nilgün
- Iskender Altin
- Miraç Eronat
- Gülgün Kutlu
- Mirac Eronat
