= Taner Birsel =

Turkish actor

- Born: 1959 (age 66–67); Akhisar, Turkey
- Occupation: Actor
- Years active: 1985–present

Taner Birsel (born 1959) is a Turkish film actor. He has appeared in twelve films since 1995. He starred in The Confession, which was screened in the Un Certain Regard section at the 2002 Cannes Film Festival.

== Selected filmography ==
Year	Title	Role	Notes
2001	Summer Love		
2002	The Confession	Harun	
2006	Times and Winds	Zekeriya	
2011	Our Grand Despair	Murat	
2011	Once Upon a Time in Anatolia	Prosecutor Nusret	Turkish: Bir Zamanlar Anadolu'da
2013	The Butterfly's Dream	İsmail Uslu	
2014	The Lamb	Adnan Bey	
