= The Third Page =

Üçüncü Sayfa
- Directed by: Zeki Demirkubuz
- Written by: Zeki Demirkubuz
- Produced by: Zeki Demirkubuz; Nihal Koldaş
- Starring: Başak Köklükaya; Ruhi Sarı
- Cinematography: Ali Utku
- Edited by: Nevzat Dişiaçık
- Release date: 29 October 1999
- Running time: 92 minutes
- Country: Turkey
- Language: Turkish

The Third Page (Turkish: Üçüncü Sayfa) is a 1999 Turkish drama film directed by Zeki Demirkubuz and starring Başak Köklükaya and Ruhi Sarı The plot follows Isa, a semi-professional actor who is falsely accused of a robbery and given 24 hours to return the money. In a fit of rage, after his landlord reminds him he has not paid rent for the last 4 months, Isa shots and kills him, then mysteriously wakes up, back in his own home.

== Cast ==
- Başak Köklükaya - Meryem
- Ruhi Sarı - Isa Demirci
- Cengiz Sezici - House-Owner
- Serdar Orçin - House-Owner's Son
