= Ruhi Sarı =

Turkish actor (born 1972)

- Born: 18 May 1972 (age 54); Trabzon, Turkey
- Occupation: Actor
- Years active: 1995–present
- Height: 1.78 m (5 ft 10 in)
- Spouse: Natali Yeres (m. 2004; div. 2018)
- Children: 1

Ruhi Sarı (born 18 May 1972) is a Turkish actor. He is best known for hit series "Yeditepe İstanbul", "Yarım Elma", "Sultan Makamı". He has appeared in more than ninety films and series.

== Selected filmography ==
Year	Title	Role	Notes
1999	The Third Page		
2004	Where's Firuze?		
2007	For Love and Honor		
2010	Haze		
2010	Toll Booth		
