= Lake Gölcük =

Volcanic lake in Turkey

- Gölcük Gölü (Turkish)
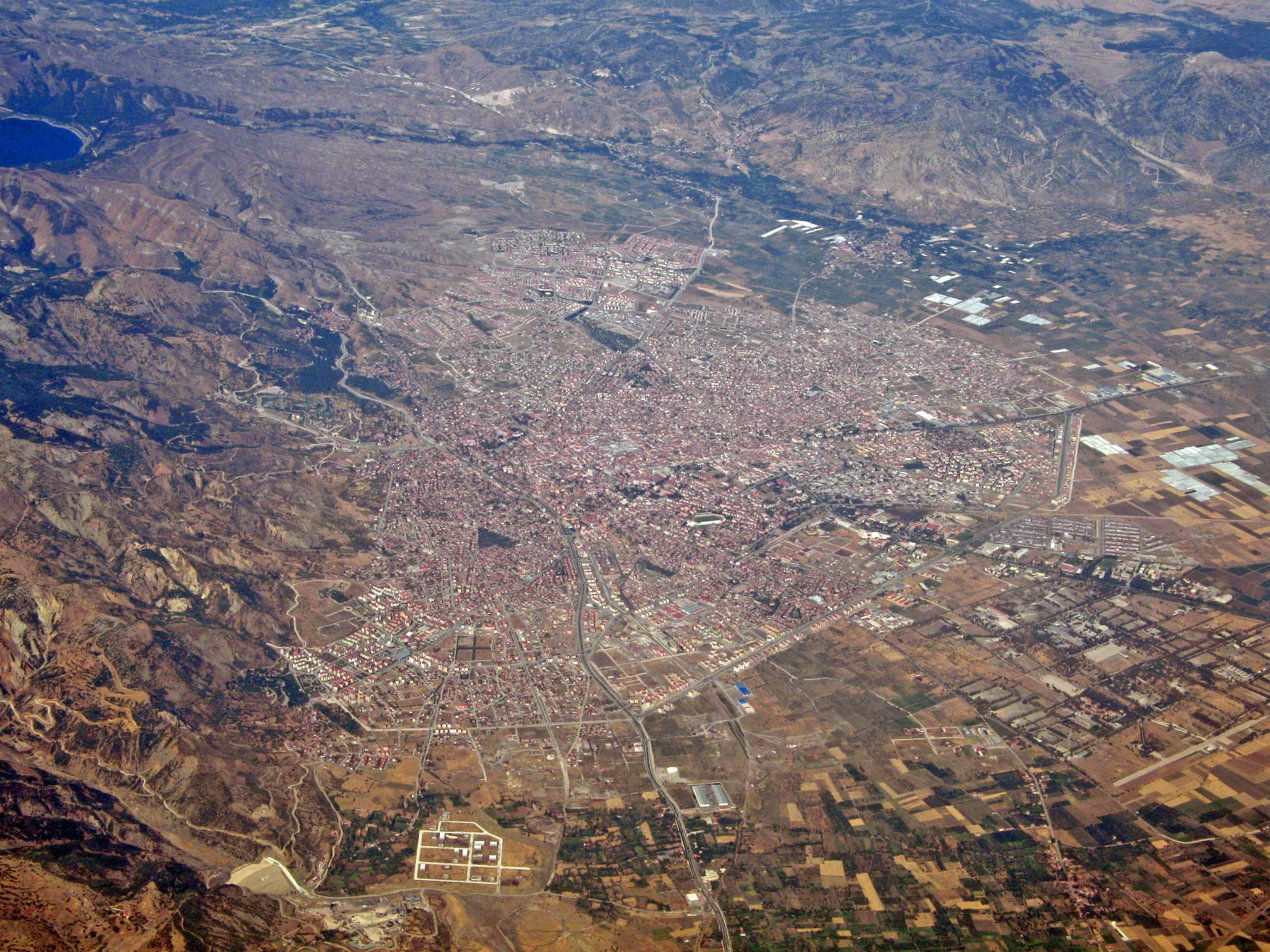
- The Lake Gölcük in the upper left corner with Isparta

- Location of Lake Gölcük
- Location: Isparta, Isparta Province, Turkey
- Coordinates: 37°43′12″N 30°29′24″E
- Type: Volcanic
- Max. width: 2.5 km (1.6 mi)
- Surface area: 1.05 km^{2} (0.41 sq mi)
- Max. depth: 32 m (105 ft)
- Surface elevation: 1,380 m (4,530 ft)

The Lake Gölcük (in Turkish: Gölcük Gölü) is a volcanic freshwater lake located 8 km southwest of the center of Isparta, in the province of the same name, in western Turkey.

== Geography ==
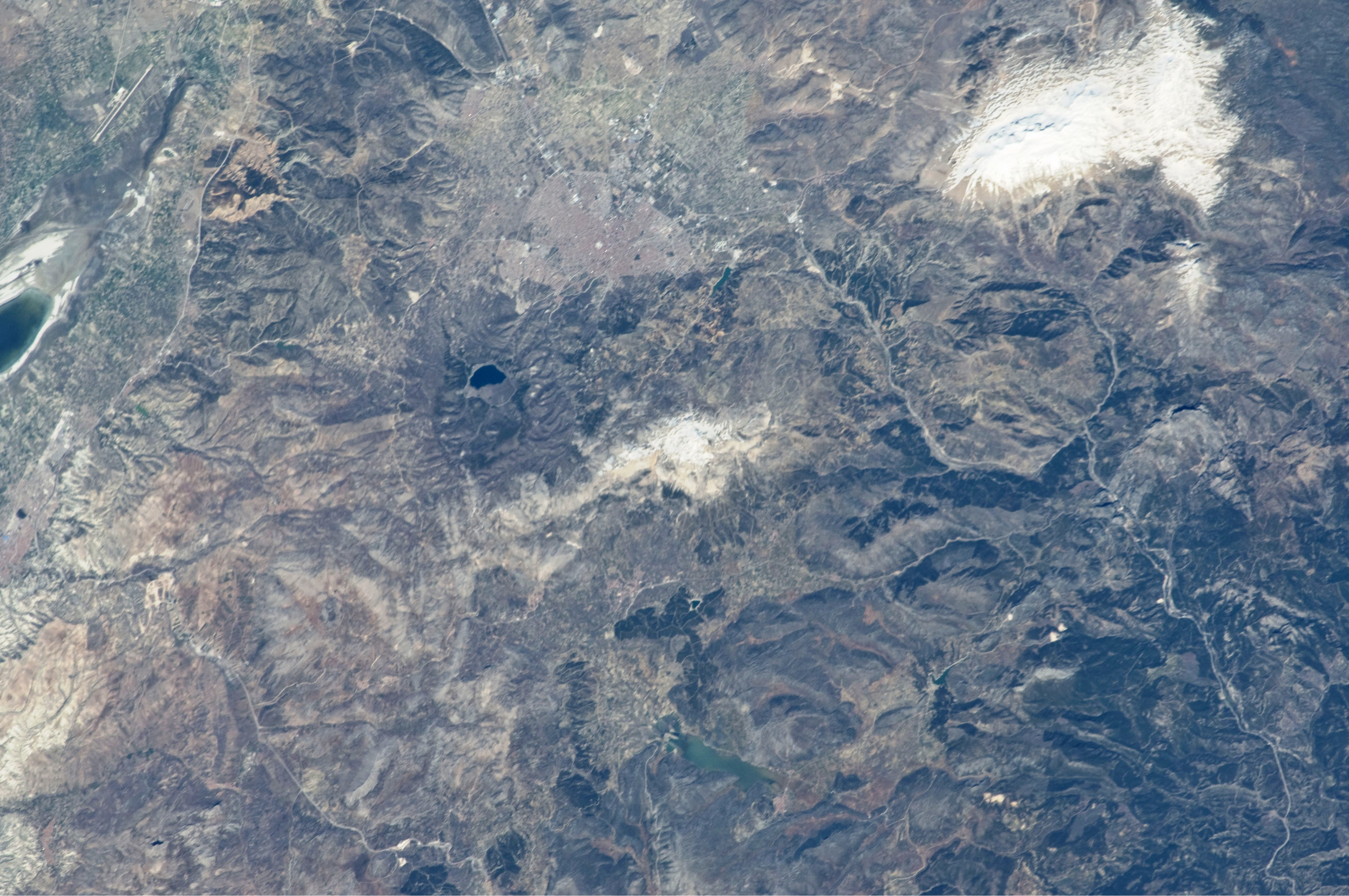
Isparta and the Lake Gölcük in 2010 in a photo taken at 337 kilometres (209 mi) altitude

It is a lake hosted in a maar whose rim is 150 to 300 m high from the water surface. The lake is located at an altitude of 1380 m, has an area of 105 hectares, a width of 2.5 km, and a depth of 32 m. It is fed by springs at the bottom of the lake and by rainwater. The lake's water is fresh. For a while, the drinking water for the center of Isparta was sourced from here. The lake was registered as a natural park in 1991. The Gölcük maar began to be active with lava eruptions in the Pliocene era, 5 million years before our era, and remained active until 24,000 years ago (Pleistocene). The formation of the maar, which has lasted for 200,000 years, is divided into three explosive phases. The 30,000-year interval between the phases of the last eruption suggests that the volcano has been dormant for 24,000 years and suggests the possibility of a reawakening. The emissions of carbon dioxide (CO_{2}) from the lake are monitored by scientists as a means of predicting a volcanic eruption.

== Fauna and flora ==
The natural vegetation in the area includes Calabrian pine, Black pine, acacia, oak, cedar, chinaberry, dyer's greenweed, cistus, astragalus. Among the mammals found there are the wild boar, fox, rabbit, badger, squirrel; there are also snakes, while the avifauna includes the partridge, woodcock, crow, buzzard, and among the waterfowl, the mallard and coot. Numerous species of fish live in the water.

Due to its flora, fauna, and landscape, the area was declared a natural park in 1991.
