= Zeki Demirkubuz =

Turkish film director, screenwriter and film producer

Zeki Demirkubuz (born 1 October 1964) is a contemporary Turkish film director, screenwriter, producer and film editor.

== Biography ==
Demirkubuz dropped out of high school and started working in a textile workshop. He then worked as a street vendor for some time. After the 1980 coup d'état, he was imprisoned without trial for three years at the age of 17 for alleged communist activities and was tortured. At the time, he was studying Communication studies at Istanbul University. Following his graduation, he became involved with movie making. After working as an assistant director, he established his own production company called "Mavi Film". Uncompromising and fiercely independent, Demirkubuz controls almost every aspect of his films, making few concessions to prevailing trends.

He started in the movie business as the assistant of director Zeki Ökten in 1986 and made his first film, "C Blok" in 1994. He was able to manage his projects with very low budgets due to the experience he gained while working as an assistant.

Some of his films are "Masumiyet" (1997), which was shown at Venice Film Festival and "Üçüncü Sayfa" (1999), also shown at many international film festivals like Locarno and Rotterdam. The films "Yazgı" (2001) and "İtiraf" (2001) included in his "Mental Minefields: The Dark Tales" trilogy [written by Zeki Demirkubuz] were shown at Cannes Film Festival's "Uncompetitive section". He made "Bekleme Odası" in 2003.

Demirkubuz refers to Dostoevsky in his cinematographic mentality. His scenarios grow on the ethical dilemmas of the human condition. He usually uses basic concepts such as love, passion, self-sacrifice, and the absurdity of life and death.

Zeki Demirkubuz's "Kader" won "The Best Film" prize at 2006 Antalya Golden Orange Film Festival.

== Filmography ==
- 1994 C Blok ("Block C")
- 1997 Masumiyet ("Innocence")
- 1999 Üçüncü Sayfa ("The Third Page")
- 2001 Yazgı ("Fate")
- 2001 İtiraf ("The Confession")
- 2003 Bekleme Odası ("The Waiting Room")
- 2006 Kader ("Destiny")
- 2009 Kıskanmak ("Envy")
- 2012 Yeraltı ("Inside")
- 2015 Bulantı ("Nausea")
- 2016 Kor ("Ember")
- 2023 Hayat ("Life")

Awards
Preceded by Tunç Başaran	Golden Boll Award for Best Director; 1997 for Masumiyet	Succeeded by Uğur Yücel
Preceded by Turgut Yasalar	Golden Orange Award for Best Screenplay; 1999 for Üçüncü Sayfa	Succeeded by Fatih Altınöz
Preceded by Derviş Zaim	Golden Orange Award for Best Director; 2001 for Yazgı	Succeeded by Nuri Bilge Ceylan
