= 4th Yeşilçam Awards =

- Yeşilçam Award
- Date: March 28, 2011
- Location: Lütfi Kırdar Congress & Exhibition Hall
- Country: Turkey
- Presented by: Turkish Foundation of Cinema and Audiovisual Culture (TÜRSAK); Beyoğlu Municipality
- Website: http://www.yesilcamodulleri.com

Television/radio coverage
- Network: NTV Turkey

The 4th Yeşilçam Awards (Turkish: 4. Yeşilçam Ödülleri), presented by the Turkish Foundation of Cinema and Audiovisual Culture (TÜRSAK) and Beyoğlu Municipality, honored the best Turkish films of 2010 and took place at the conclusion of the 4th Yeşilçam Week festival on March 28, 2011, at the Lütfi Kırdar Congress and Exhibition Hall in Istanbul, Turkey.

The 4th Yeşilçam Week, which will run from March 21 to 28, 2011, will include cinema screenings of classic Turkish films at the Turabibaba Library in Beyoğlu, a concert of Turkish film songs by the band Türk Kahvesi at the Beyoğlu Municipality Youth Culture Center on March 24, an exhibition of portrait photographs by Reza Hemmatirad of filmmaker Osman Sınav at the Beyoğlu Municipal Art Gallery, an exhibition of winning photographs photography from the "Cinemascope Beyoğlu" competition at the Youth Culture Center, and concluded with the awards presentation.

== Awards and nominations ==
A committee of 800 people, including industry representatives, chose five nominees in each of the 13 categories, which include the two new categories of Best Art Director and Best Editor. A second committee of nearly 3,000 people selected winners from among the nominees. The best film won 250,000 TL, while the winners of the Best First Film and the Best Director awards received 50,000 TL.

=== Best Film ===
- Winner: Majority (Turkish: Çoğunluk) produced by Önder Çakar, Sevil Demirci & Seren Yüce
- Hunting Season (Turkish: Av Mevsimi) produced by Yavuz Turgul & Murat Akdilek
- Eyyvah Eyvah produced by Necati Akpinar
- The Crossing (Turkish: Kavşak) produced by Türker Korkmaz
- Cosmos (Turkish: Kosmos) produced by Ömer Atay
- Yahşi Batı produced by Murat Akdilek & Cem Yılmaz

=== Best Director ===
- Winner: Reha Erdem for Cosmos (Turkish: Kosmos)
- Ömer Faruk Sorak for Yahşi Batı
- Selim Demirdelen for The Crossing (Turkish: Kavşak)
- Seren Yüce for Majority (Turkish: Çoğunluk)
- Yavuz Turgul for Hunting Season (Turkish: Av Mevsimi)

=== Best Actress ===
- Winner: Demet Akbağ for Eyyvah Eyvah
- Demet Evgar for Yahşi Batı
- Esme Madra for Majority (Turkish: Çoğunluk)
- Sevinç Erbulak for Sleeping Princess (Turkish: Prensesin Uykusu)
- Türkü Turan for Cosmos (Turkish: Kosmos)

=== Best Actor ===
- Winner: Cem Yılmaz for Hunting Season (Turkish: Av Mevsimi)
- Bartu Küçükçağlayan for Majority (Turkish: Çoğunluk)
- Güven Kıraç for The Crossing (Turkish: Kavşak)
- Sermet Yeşil for Cosmos (Turkish: Kosmos)
- Tansu Biçer for Five Cities (Turkish: Beş Şehir)

=== Best Supporting Actor ===
- Winner: Okan Yalabık for Hunting Season (Turkish: Av Mevsimi)
- Bülent Emin Yarar for Five Cities (Turkish: Beş Şehir)
- Çetin Tekindor for Hunting Season (Turkish: Av Mevsimi)
- Salih Kalyon for Eyyvah Eyvah
- Zafer Algöz for Yahşi Batı

=== Best Supporting Actress ===
- Winner: Melisa Sözen for Hunting Season (Turkish: Av Mevsimi)
- Nihal Koldaş for Majority (Turkish: Çoğunluk)
- Özge Özpirinççi for Veda
- Selen Uçer for A Step into the Darkness (Turkish: Büyük Oyun)
- Şebnem Sönmez for Five Cities (Turkish: Beş Şehir)

=== Best Cinematogropher ===
- Winner: Uğur İçbak for Hunting Season (Turkish: Av Mevsimi)
- Barış Özbiçer for Majority (Turkish: Çoğunluk)
- Florent Herry for Cosmos (Turkish: Kosmos)
- Mirsad Herović for Yahşi Batı
- Türksoy Gölebeyi for The Voice (Turkish: Ses)

=== Best Editor ===
- Winner: Reha Erdem for Cosmos (Turkish: Kosmos)
- Çağrı Türkan for Yahşi Batı
- Çiçek Kahraman & Natalin Solakoğlu for The Voice (Turkish: Ses)
- Mary Stephen for Majority (Turkish: Çoğunluk)
- Selim Demirdelen for The Crossing (Turkish: Kavşak)

=== Best Art Director ===
- Winner: Hakan Yarkın for Yahşi Batı
- Hakan Yarkın for Veda
- Meral Efe for Majority (Turkish: Çoğunluk)
- Ömer Atay for Cosmos (Turkish: Kosmos)
- Sırma Bradley for Hunting Season (Turkish: Av Mevsimi)

=== Best Screenplay ===
- Winner: Seren Yüce for Majority (Turkish: Çoğunluk)
- Ata Demirer for Eyyvah Eyvah
- Onur Ünlü for Five Cities (Turkish: Beş Şehir)
- Reha Erdem for Cosmos (Turkish: Kosmos)
- Selim Demirdelen for The Crossing (Turkish: Kavşak)
- Yavuz Turgul for Hunting Season (Turkish: Av Mevsimi)

=== Best Music ===
- Winner: Selim Demirdelen for The Crossing (Turkish: Kavşak)
- Fahir Atakoğlu & Serkan Çağrı for Eyyvah Eyvah
- Redd for Sleeping Princess (Turkish: Prensesin Uykusu)
- Tamer Çıray for Hunting Season (Turkish: Av Mevsimi)
- Zülfü Livaneli for Veda

=== Best Young Talent Award ===
- Winner: Esme Madra for Majority (Turkish: Çoğunluk)
- Büşra Pekin for Çok Filim Hareketler Bunlar
- Damla Sönmez for Mahpeyker: Kösem Sultan
- Şenay Orak for Min Dît: The Children of Diyarbakır (Kurdish: Min Dît; Turkish: Ben Gördüm)
- Umut Kurt for The Crossing (Turkish: Kavşak)

=== Turkcell First Film Award ===
- Winner: Seren Yüce for Majority (Turkish: Çoğunluk)
- Erhan Kozan for The Jackal (Turkish: Çakal)
- Ozan Açıktan for Çok Filim Hareketler Bunlar
- Selim Demirdelen for The Crossing (Turkish: Kavşak)
- Aslı Özge for Men on the Bridge (Turkish: Köprüdekiler)
- Ketche for Romantic Comedy (Turkish: Romantik Komedi)

=== Service to Culture and Art Award ===
- Nebahat Çehre (Turkish actress)
- Göksel Arsoy (Turkish actor)
- İzzet Günay (Turkish actor)

=== Yeşilçam Pride of Performance Award ===
- Türker İnanoğlu (Turkish screenwriter, film director and producer)

== See also ==
- 43rd SİYAD Awards
- Turkish films of 2010
- 2010 in film
