= 43rd SİYAD Awards =

- Date: February 24, 2011
- Location: Türker İnanoğlu Maslak Show Center
- Country: Turkey
- Presented by: Turkish Film Critics Association (SİYAD)
- Website: http://www.siyad.org/article.php?id=4923

Television/radio coverage
- Network: Turkmax

The 43rd SİYAD Awards (Turkish: 43. SİYAD Ödülleri), presented by the Turkish Film Critics Association (SİYAD), honored the best Turkish films of 2010 and took place on February 24, 2011, at the Türker İnanoğlu Maslak Show Center in Istanbul, Turkey.

== Awards and nominations ==
=== Best Film ===
- Winner: Cosmos (Turkish: Kosmos) produced by Ömer Atay
  - Five Cities (Turkish: Beş Şehir) produced by Funda Alp and Onur Ünlü
  - Majority (Turkish: Çoğunluk) produced by Önder Çakar, Sevil Demirci and Seren Yüce
  - Honey (Turkish: Bal) produced by Semih Kaplanoğlu
  - Dark Cloud (Turkish: Bahtı Kara) produced by Enis Köstepen, Yamaç Okur and Nadir Öperli

=== Best Director ===
- Winner: Reha Erdem for Cosmos (Turkish: Kosmos)
  - Semih Kaplanoğlu for Honey (Turkish: Bal)
  - Theron Patterson for Dark Cloud (Turkish: Bahtı Kara)
  - Onur Ünlü for Five Cities (Turkish: Beş Şehir)
  - Seren Yüce for Majority (Turkish: Çoğunluk)

=== Mahmut Tali Award for Best Script ===
- Winner: Seren Yüce for Majority (Turkish: Çoğunluk)
  - Selim Demirdelen for The Crossing (Turkish: Kavşak)
  - Reha Erdem for Cosmos (Turkish: Kosmos)
  - Semih Kaplanoğlu and Orçun Köksal for Honey (Turkish: Bal)
  - Onur Ünlü for Five Cities (Turkish: Beş Şehir)

=== Cahide Sonku Award for Best Actress ===
- Winner: Sevinç Erbulak for Sleeping Princess (Turkish: Prensesin Uykusu)
  - Demet Akbağ for Eyyvah Eyvah
  - Sezin Akbaşoğulları for The Crossing (Turkish: Kavşak)
  - Esme Madra for Majority (Turkish: Çoğunluk)
  - Türkü Turan for Cosmos (Turkish: Kosmos)

=== Best Actor ===
- Winner: Bartu Küçükçağlayan for Majority (Turkish: Çoğunluk)
  - Tansu Biçer for Five Cities (Turkish: Beş Şehir)
  - Güven Kıraç for The Crossing (Turkish: Kavşak)
  - Reha Özcan for Dark Cloud (Turkish: Bahtı Kara)
  - Sermet Yeşil for Cosmos (Turkish: Kosmos)

=== Best Supporting Actress ===
- Winner: Nihal Koldaş for Majority (Turkish: Çoğunluk)
  - Yeşim Ceren Bozoğlu for Dark Cloud (Turkish: Bahtı Kara)
  - Ceyda Düvenci for Dragon Trap (Turkish: Ejder Kapanı)
  - Selen Uçer for A Step into the Darkness (Turkish: Büyük Oyun)
  - Nurcan Ülger for Haze (Turkish: Pus)

=== Best Supporting Actor ===
- Winner: Settar Tanrıöğen for Majority (Turkish: Çoğunluk)
  - Erdal Beşikçioğlu for Honey (Turkish: Bal)
  - Genco Erkal for Sleeping Princess (Turkish: Prensesin Uykusu)
  - Volga Sorgu for Black Dogs Barking (Turkish: Kara Köpekler Havlarken)
  - Cem Yılmaz for Hunting Season (Turkish: Av Mevsimi)

=== Best Cinematogropher ===
- Winner: Florent Herry for Cosmos (Turkish: Kosmos)
  - Uğur İçbak for Hunting Season (Turkish: Av Mevsimi)
  - Barış Özbiçer for Honey (Turkish: Bal)
  - Barış Özbiçer for Majority (Turkish: Çoğunluk)
  - Ercan Özkan for Haze (Turkish: Pus)

=== Best Music ===
- Winner: Selim Demirdelen for The Crossing (Turkish: Kavşak)
  - Alp Erkin Çakmak and Barış Diri for Black Dogs Barking (Turkish: Kara Köpekler Havlarken)
  - Tamer Çıray for Hunting Season (Turkish: Av Mevsimi)
  - Herve Guyader and Reha Erdem for Cosmos (Turkish: Kosmos)
  - Cenap Oğuz for Five Cities (Turkish: Beş Şehir)

=== Best Editor ===
- Winner: Reha Erdem for Cosmos (Turkish: Kosmos)
  - Ahmet Can Çakırca for Five Cities (Turkish: Beş Şehir)
  - Selim Demirdelen for The Crossing (Turkish: Kavşak)
  - Ayhan Ergürsel, Semih Kaplanoğlu and Suzan Hande Güneri for Honey (Turkish: Bal)
  - Mary Stephen for Majority (Turkish: Çoğunluk)

=== Best Art Director ===
- Winner: Ömer Atay for Cosmos (Turkish: Kosmos)
  - Meral Efe for Majority (Turkish: Çoğunluk)
  - Naz Erayda for Honey (Turkish: Bal)
  - Elif Taşçıoğlu for Haze (Turkish: Pus)
  - Hakan Yarkın for Yahşi Batı

=== Honorary Awards ===
- Yusuf Kurçenli (filmmaker)
- Tuncel Kurtiz (actor)
- Cahit Berkay (musician)

== See also ==
- 4th Yeşilçam Awards
- Turkish films of 2010
- 2010 in film
