= 16th London Turkish Film Festival =

2010 film festival edition

- Festival Logo
- Location: London, England
- Awards: Golden Wings
- Festival date: November 4–18, 2010
- Website: http://www.ltff.org.uk/index.php

The 16th London Turkish Film Festival is a film festival held in London, England which ran from November 4 to 18, 2010. During the course of the festival seventeen feature films and two programmes of shorts were presented at the Apollo Theatre and the Rio Cinema.

The festival began with an opening gala at the Empire, Leicester Square, attended by Turkish Ambassador to London Ünal Çeviköz, Turkish Ministry of Culture and Tourism official Abdurrahman Çelik, actor Şener Şen, film and theater star Genco Erkal and director Çağan Irmak, at which the Golden Wings awards for Lifetime Achievement and Digiturk Digital Distribution were presented and Sleeping Princess (Turkish: Prensesin Uykusu) directed by Çağan Irmak received its world premiere.

== Awards ==
- Golden Wings Lifetime Achievement Award: Şener Şen (actor)
- Golden Wings Digiturk Digital Distribution Award: Honey (Turkish: Bal) directed by Semih Kaplanoğlu

== Programmes ==
=== Opening Film ===
- Sleeping Princess (Turkish: Prensesin Uykusu) directed by Çağan Irmak

=== Golden Wings Digiturk Digital Distribution Competition ===
Five Turkish films made in the preceding year were selected to compete in the festival’s feature film competition.

==== Competition Jury ====
- Catharine des Forges (Independent Cinema Office director)
- Derek Malcolm (film writer and critic)
- Sevin Okyay (Turkish film critic, writer and translator)
- Louis Savy (Sci-Fi-London festival programmer and director)

==== Films in Competition ====
- Cosmos (Turkish: Kosmos) directed by Reha Erdem
- The Crossing (Turkish: Kavşak) directed by Selim Demirdelen
- Honey (Turkish: Bal) directed by Semih Kaplanoğlu
- In Darkness (Turkish: Karanlıktakiler) directed by Çağan Irmak
- Majority (Turkish: Çogunluk) directed by Seren Yüce

=== Out of Competition Showings ===
- Based Down South (German: Wir Sitzen im Süden) directed by Martina Priessner
- Black and White (Turkish: Siyah Beyaz) directed by Ahmet Boyacıoğlu
- Dark Cloud (Turkish: Bahtı Kara) directed by Theron Patterson
- Loose Cannons (Italian: Mine Vaganti) directed by Ferzan Özpetek
- Müezzin directed by Sebastian Brameshuber
- Not Worth A Fig (Turkish: İncir Çekirdeği) directed by Selda Çiçek
- Resurrecting: The Street Walker directed by Özgür Uyanık
- Tales From Kars (Turkish: Kars Öyküleri) directed by Özcan Alper, Ülkü Oktay, Emre Akay, Ahu Öztürk & Zehra Derya Koç
- Turquoise (Turkish: Turkuaz) directed by Kadir Balcı

=== "Yusuf Trilogy" by Semih Kaplanoğlu ===
- Egg (Turkish: Yumurta) directed by Semih Kaplanoğlu
- Milk (Turkish: Süt) directed by Semih Kaplanoğlu

== See also ==
- 2010 in film
- Turkish films of 2010
