= Majority (film) =

- Turkish poster
- Directed by: Seren Yüce
- Starring: Bartu Küçükçaglayan; Settar Tanrıöğen; Nihal Koldas; Esme Madra
- Cinematography: Barış Biçer
- Music by: Gökçe Akçelik
- Release dates: 9 September 2010 (Venice); 15 October 2010 (Turkey)
- Running time: 111 minutes
- Country: Turkey
- Language: Turkish

Majority (Turkish: Çoğunluk) is a 2010 Turkish drama film directed by Seren Yüce, which tells the story of a middle class young man rebelling against his father's brutish authority while seeking a rough romance with a woman of ethnic minority. The film, which went on nationwide general release across Turkey on October 15, 2010, won several Golden Orange awards at the 47th International Antalya Golden Orange Film Festival and was premiered at the 67th Venice International Film Festival, where it won the Lion of the Future for best debut film. Hürriyet Daily News reporter Vercihan Zilioğlu wrote that, "The director's moral tale draws on the example of today's Turkish youth and the timeless shadow of fathers over sons," and Today's Zaman reviewer Emine Yıldırım concludes that this is, "one of the rawest and truest stories from our society," and "As Yüce’s hardcore realism shows us, love sometimes does not conquer all when individuals chose to become part of the herd."

== Synopsis ==
Mertkan (Bartu Küçükçağlayan) is a young man who has a stable but unfulfilling life in Istanbul, living at home with his parents, working as an errand boy in his father's construction company, hanging out with his friends in shopping malls and discos.

When he meets Gül (Esme Madra), a Kurdish girl from eastern Turkey, Mertkan starts to become a bit more self-confident and it seems possible that he could break away from his oppressive parents. But Mertkan's domineering father opposes any association with "those people who only want to divide our country."

== Release ==
=== Festival screenings ===
- 67th Venice International Film Festival (September 1–11, 2010)
- 47th International Antalya Golden Orange Film Festival (October 9–14, 2010)
- 12th Mumbai Film Festival (October 21–28, 2010)
- 16th London Turkish Film Festival (November 4–18, 2010)
- 16th Festival on Wheels (December 9–19, 2010)
- 23rd Premiers Plans European First Film Festival (January 21–30, 2011)
- 22nd Ankara International Film Festival (March 17–27, 2011)

== Reception ==
=== Awards ===
- 67th Venice International Film Festival - Luigi de Laurentis Award for a Debut Film (won)
- 47th International Antalya Golden Orange Film Festival National Film Competition
  - Golden Orange Award for Best Film (won)
  - Golden Orange Award for Best Director: Seren Yüce (won)
  - Golden Orange Award for Best Actor: Bartu Küçükçağlayan (shared with Serkan Ercan for Toll Booth)
- 12th Mumbai Film Festival International First Feature Film Competition
  - Golden Gateway Award for Best Film (won)
  - Silver Gateway Award for Best Actor: Bartu Küçükçağlayan (won)
- 23rd Premiers Plans European First Film Festival - Grand Jury Prize (Shared with Reverse Motion directed by Andrey Stempkovsky)
- 22nd Ankara International Film Festival
  - Best Supporting Actor: Settar Tanrıöğen (also for Shadows and Faces)
  - Most Promising New Actor: Bartu Küçükçağlayan (shared with Aram Dildar for Press)
- 43rd SİYAD Awards (February 24, 2011)
  - Mahmut Tali Award for Best Script: Seren Yüce (won)
  - Best Actor: Bartu Küçükçağlayan (won)
  - Best Supporting Actress: Nihal Koldaş (won)
  - Best Supporting Actor: Settar Tanrıöğen (won)
- 4th Yeşilçam Awards (March 28, 2011)
  - Best Film (won)
  - Best Screenplay: Seren Yüce (won)
  - Turkcell First Film Award (won)

=== Reception ===
The all-female 12th Mumbai Film Festival Jury, chaired by Jane Campion and including Samira Makhmalbaf, stated in their award citation for the film that it, "told its story with a Chekhovian charm; humorous, clear and haunting," which with "simplicity, tells a story that reveals the detailed anatomy of a particular kind of bullying masculinity and how it is passed down from father to son," and cited lead actor, Bartu Küçükçağlayan, "for his strikingly unconventional portrayal of an uninspiring young man… achieved with remarkable detail and conviction."

Today's Zaman reviewer Emine Yıldırım introduces the film as, "a hard slap in the face -- a well-deserved and succinct one that reminds us of the macro social realities of Turkish society through the microcosm of one young man," and goes on to state that it, "doesn’t just showcase the dominance of a particular social class; it reflects how patriarchal misogyny is an integral part of our society." "Taking strength from his well-timed and realistic script, Yüce’s direction is almost flawless," the reviewer concludes that,"is one of the best Turkish films of the year. With its impeccable narration and no-nonsense style it exposes a harsh social reality that we prefer to dismiss -- it’s just always easier and more comfortable to be a part of the largest and strongest herd."

== See also ==
- Turkish films of 2010
