= Berke Hatipoğlu =

- Birth name: Berke Hatipoğlu
- Born: 7 May 1976 (age 48); Istanbul, Turkey
- Genres: Rock
- Occupation(s): Architect, musician, guitarist, songwriter, arranger
- Instrument(s): Electric guitar, acoustic guitar, mandolin, back vocal
- Years active: 1994–present
- Labels: Stardium, Pasaj Müzik, Sony Music - Arısta, Most Production-İmaj Müzik
- Website: www.redd.com.tr

Berke Hatipoğlu (born 7 May 1976) is an architect, musician, and lead guitarist for the Turkish rock band, Redd.

== Biography ==
Berke Hatipoğlu was born on 7 May 1976 in Istanbul, Turkey. At the age of 14 he began to play guitar, initially being educated by his father, Haluk Hatipoğlu. After playing guitar during high school years, in 1994 he started a professional music career in Istanbul. In a music contest held during the opening ceremony of the Tuyap music fair in 1995, with Michael D'Angelo as jury member, he won the first place as the best guitarist. In 1996, Güneş Duru and Ilke Hatipoğlu joined the Ten band founded by Berke Hatipoğlu and Doğan Duru. Thus the core members of their band was formed, which was later renamed to Redd. He performed in many concerts and festivals with Ten band from 1996 until 2002.

In 1998, along with his younger brother, like Hatipoğlu, he participated in an alternative project, Gökalp Baykal & Catwalk, to release an album named Günaydın Hüzün, where he played and arranged all songs and wrote one. He spent the period between 2000 and 2004 writing and arranging songs along with Redd members and finally they released Redd's first studio album, 50-50 in 2005.

Berke Hatipoğlu has performed as guitarist, back vocal, songwriter and arranger in all Redd albums; "50-50" (2005), Kirli Suyunda Parıltılar (2006), Plastik Çiçekler ve Böcek (2008), Gecenin Fişi Yok (2008), 21 (2009), a soundtrack album, Prensesin Uykusu (2010) and Hayat Kaçık Bir Uykudur (2012). Also, he designed the album cover for "Günaydın Hüzün" and some Redd albums like "Plastik Çiçek ve Böcek" and the DVD of Redd's acoustic concert, "Gecenin Fişi Yok" (2008).

Berke Hatipoğlu studied environmental engineering at Istanbul Technical University from 1994 to 1997 but gave up this field and started to study architecture at Istanbul Technical University and graduated in 2001. Also being an expert in 3D and digital architectural illustration, he held a teaching position in the faculty of architecture at Maltepe University in 2003 through 2009 and has taught in the faculty of fine arts at Doğuş University since 2008. He has participated in several architectural projects, conferences and contests.

== Instruments ==
=== Guitars ===
- Fender Custom Shop Telecaster '63 Relic
- Fender Telecaster Standard
- Gibson Les Paul Standard
- Gibson ES 333
- Martin Acoustic D1
- Yamaha 12 String
- Edward&Jones Mandolin
- Eko Classic Guitar
- Framus Bass

=== Amplifiers ===
- Marshall Bluesbreaker Reissue
- Marshall JCM800
- Marshall JTM30

=== Pedals ===
- Fulltone Fulldrive 2
- Fulltone Fat boost 2
- İbanez Tube Screamer TS9
- Electro Harmonix Pulsar
- Electro Harmonix MemoryMan
- Electro Harmonix Freeze
- Electro Harmonix Electric Mistress
- Electro Harmonix Holygrail
- Boss DD3
- Boss TU2
- Keeley Compressor
- Carl Martin Octa Switch
- ProcoRat Vintage
- ProcoRat Deuce
- Jim Dunlop CryBaby Wah

== Discography with Redd ==
- 50-50 (2005)
- Kirli Suyunda Parıltılar (2006)
- Plastik Çiçekler ve Böcek (2008)
- Gecenin Fişi Yok (2008)
- 21 (2009)
- Prensesin Uykusu (2010) (soundtrack album)
- Hayat Kaçık Bir Uykudur (2012)
