= 22nd Ankara International Film Festival =

- Festival Poster
- Location: Ankara, Turkey
- Festival date: March 17–27, 2011
- Website: http://www.filmfestankara.org.tr/en

Ankara Film Festival
- 21st

The 22nd Ankara International Film Festival was a film festival held in Ankara, Turkey, which ran from March 17 to 27, 2011. Films were screened at Batı Movie Theater, Büyülü Fener Kızılay, Çankaya Municipality Contemporary Arts Center and the Goethe Institut Ankara, and the Street of Art events took place across the city. Polish filmmaker Jerzy Skolimowski was the guest of honor at the festival which included a retrospective of his work.

This edition of the Ankara Film Festival, organized by The World Mass Media Research Foundation and accredited by FIPRESCI, opened with a gala on the evening of March 16 at the Ministry of Education Assembly Hall, at which the foundation special awards were presented, and the Emre Kartarı Jazz Band performed film music.

The festival concluded with an awards ceremony on March 27 at the Ministry of Education Assembly Hall, at which Derviş Zaim, whose film Shadows and Faces (Turkish: Gölgeler ve Suretler) won the top award, announced "I will try to live up to this honor and I will continue making films that take risks."

A total of 620 films were submitted to the competition and screening sections of this edition of the festival.

== Awards ==
=== National Feature Film Competition Awards ===
- Best Film: Shadows and Faces (Turkish: Gölgeler ve Suretler) directed by Derviş Zaim.
- Mahmut Tali Öngören Special Award: White as Snow (Turkish: Kar Beyaz) directed by Selim Güneş.
- Best Director: Derviş Zaim for Shadows and Faces (Turkish: Gölgeler ve Suretler).
- SİYAD Best Film Award: Shadows and Faces (Turkish: Gölgeler ve Suretler) directed by Derviş Zaim.
- Best Actor: Güven Kıraç for The Crossing (Turkish: Kavşak).
- Best Actress: Popi Avraam for Shadows and Faces (Turkish: Gölgeler ve Suretler).
- Best Supporting Actor: Settar Tanrıöğen for Shadows and Faces (Turkish: Gölgeler ve Suretler) & Majority (Turkish: Çoğunluk).
- Best Supporting Actress: Sinem İslamoğlu for White as Snow (Turkish: Kar Beyaz).
- Onat Kutlar Best Script Award: Sedat Yılmaz for Press.
- Most Promising New Director: Sedat Yılmaz for Press.
- Most Promising New Script Writer: Selim Güneş for White as Snow (Turkish: Kar Beyaz).
- Jury Special Performance Prize: Didem Soylu, Buse Kılıçkaya, Seyham Arman & Ayta Sözeri Other Angels (Turkish: Teslimiyet).
- Most Promising New Actor: Aram Dildar for Press & Bartu Küçükçağlayan for Majority (Turkish: Çoğunluk).
- Best Cinematographer: Türksoy Gölebeyi for The Voice (Turkish: Ses)
- Best Art Director: Elif Taşçıoğlu for Shadows and Faces (Turkish: Gölgeler ve Suretler)
- Best Original Music: Mehmet Cem Ünal & Safa Hendem for The Voice (Turkish: Ses)
- Best Editor: Aylin Zoi Tinel for Shadows and Faces (Turkish: Gölgeler ve Suretler)

=== National Short Film Competition Awards ===
- Best Short Fiction Film: Bicycle (Turkish: Bısqilet) directed by İ. Serhat Karaaslan.
- Best Short Experimental Film: Tananore Love (Turkish: Aşk Tananore) directed by Ebru Güney.
- Best Short Animation Film: Istanbul (Turkish: İstanbul) directed by İdil Ar.
- Special Short Film Competition Jury Prize: 38 Degrees (Turkish: 38 Derece) directed by Ömer Sinir.

=== National Documentary Film Competition Awards ===
- Best Student Documentary Film: Mada directed by Musa Ak.
- Best Professional Documentary Film: ...Leaving Behind (Turkish: …Göç) directed by Mehmet Özgür Candan.

=== Foundation Special Awards ===
- Hasan Saltık (founder of Kalan Müzik)
- Suna Kan (violinist)
- Sezer Sezin (actress)

== National Programmes ==
=== National Feature Film Competition ===
==== National Feature Film Competition Jury ====
- Ayla Kanbur
- Fadik Sevin Atasoy
- Erdal Beşikçioğlu
- Murat Özer
- Serdar Akar

==== SİYAD Jury ====
- Agah Özgüç
- Banu Bozdemir
- Fırat Sayıcı

==== Films in competition ====
A pre-selection jury consisting of Sevilay Çelenk, Barış Kılıçbay and İnci Demirkol selected 10 films, from the 20 submissions received, to compete in the National Feature Film Competition.

- Majority (Turkish: Çoğunluk) directed by Seren Yüce.
- Shadows and Faces (Turkish: Gölgeler ve Suretler) directed by Derviş Zaim.
- Tales From Kars (Turkish: Kars Hikayeleri) directed by Özcan Alper, Ülkü Oktay, Emre Akay, Ahu Öztürk and Zehra Derya Koç.
- The Crossing (Turkish: Kavşak) directed by Selim Demirdelen.
- Lost Freedom (Turkish: Kayıp Özgürlük) directed by Umur Hozatlı.
- White as Snow (Turkish: Kar Beyaz) directed by Selim Güneş.
- Press directed by Sedat Yılmaz.
- Black and White (Turkish: Siyah Beyaz) directed by Ahmet Boyacıoğlu.
- The Voice (Turkish: Ses) directed by Ümit Ünal.
- Other Angels (Turkish: Teslimiyet) directed by Emre Yalgın.

=== National Short Film Programmes ===
==== National Short Film Competition Jury ====
- Ceylan Özçelik
- Emrah Serbes
- Çiçek Kahraman
- Stavros Chassapis
- İnan Temelkuran

==== Films in programme ====
A pre-selection jury consisting of Bülent Özkam, Cumhur Canbazoğlu and Prof. Dr. Oğuz Onaran selected 15 fictional, 7 animation and 13 experimental films to compete in the National Short Film Competition. Also 23 films were selected to be shown out of competition.

===== Fiction films in competition =====
- The Curse of The Apple (Turkish: Elmanın Laneti) directed by H.Doğan Ercan.
- The Cello directed by Necmettin Sancak.
- Gloomy Mornings (Turkish: Azap Sabahlar) directed by Serhat Eser Erdem.
- Silence (Turkish: Bedengi) directed by Aziz Çapkurt.
- Bicycle (Turkish: Bısqilet) directed by İ. Serhat Karaaslan.
- Blood (Turkish: Xwin) directed by İ. Serhat Karaaslan.
- The Father (Turkish: Baba) directed by Şenol Çöm.
- Coffee Job (Turkish: Kahve İşi) directed by Tuğçe Sönmez.
- The Paper Murderers (Turkish: Kağıttan Cinayetler) directed by Selin Cevizli.
- The Uşak Thing (Turkish: Uşak Hesabı) directed by Yusuf Emirdar.
- Movie or Movie (Turkish: Film ya da Film) directed by Şükrü Apaydın.
- Moment (Turkish: Dem) directed by Ayşegül Okul.
- Waiting (Turkish: Beklerken) directed by Burak Çevik and Kutay Denizler.
- Endeavour (Turkish: Emek) directed by Bahadır Erturun.
- The Stairway (Turkish: Merdiven) directed by İbrahim Sena Kandazoğlu.

===== Experimental films in competition =====
- The Crow (Turkish: Karga) directed by Alper Öztekin.
- Fragment (Turkish: Parça) directed by Ali İhsan Elmas.
- Nothing (Turkish: Yok) directed by Eytan İpeker.
- Shadow (Turkish: Gölge) directed by Bilgi Diren Güneş.
- Tananore Love (Turkish: Aşk Tananore) directed by Ebru Güney.
- Life in Parentheses (Turkish: Parantez İçinde Hayat) directed by Zafer Ulufer.
- Ankara Nox directed by Özlem Mengilibörü.
- Pent Pa directed by Demet Öztürk.
- About The Old World (Turkish: Eski Dünyaya Dair) directed by Bilal Çakay.
- 38 Degrees (Turkish: 38 Derece) directed by Ömer Sinir.
- Memories From The Future (Turkish: Gelecekten Anılar) directed by Hüseyin Mert Erverdi.
- Highway Screening (Turkish: Otoyol Perdeleme) directed by Yoel Meranda.
- Expectations (Turkish: Beklentiler) directed by Ethem Özgüven.

===== Animation films in competition =====
- Müsait in Somewhere (Turkish: Müsait Bir Yerde) directed by Orhan Başara.
- Grain (Turkish: Zerre) directed by Anıl Tortop.
- Slumberland (Turkish: Şekerleme) directed by Işık Dikmen.
- Istanbul (Turkish: İstanbul) directed by İdil Ar.
- One Random Day in Istanbul (Turkish: İstanbul’da Sıradan Bir Gün) directed by Nurbanu Asena.
- The Owl Who Had a Wish Tangled to its Foot (Turkish: Ayağına Dilek Takılan Baykuş) directed by Burak N. Kurt.
- Wind (Turkish: Rüzgar) directed by Murat Kılıç.

===== Out of competition screenings =====
- For Rent (Turkish: Zu Vermıeten) directed by Emre Karapınar and İsmail Onay.
- Big Little (Turkish: Büyük Küçük) directed by Emre Karakaş and Kevser Kulalıgil.
- Dis-Ko directed by Yasin Fatih Bayram.
- Untitled (Turkish: Benaw) directed by Mehmet Nuri Çetin.
- The Ottoman directed by Hakan Burcuoğlu.
- Success (Turkish: Başarı) directed by Selim Akgül.
- The Separation (Turkish: Firak) directed by Erdem Çiçek.
- Road to School (Turkish: Okul Yolu) directed by Yiğitalp Ertem.
- Beast (Turkish: Hayvan) directed by Can Sever.
- Egoist directed by Tuğçe Tunç.
- American Billiard (Turkish: Amerikan Bilardo) directed by Orhun Bora Çetin.
- The Stranger (Turkish: Yabancı) directed by Sedat Azazi and Bilal Çakay.
- Five Stone (Turkish: Beş Taş) directed by Kenan Tekeş and Rıza Barut.
- Ş's Death (Turkish: Ş’nin Ölümü) directed by Hatice Aydoğdu.
- Elif directed by Ferit Ürük.
- The Walkman (Turkish: Walkman) directed by Emre Karataş.
- Gren directed by Volkan Karagül.
- The Puppet (Turkish: Kukla) directed by Kemal Tezcan.
- 5 Liras (Turkish: 5 Lira) directed by İ. Serhat Karaaslan.
- Vantila-tograph/Gift to Ahmet Uluçay (Turkish: Vantila-Tograf/Ahmet Uluçay’a Armağan) directed by Y.Ilgaz Irmak.
- I Know I Don't Smell Good (Turkish: Güzel Kokmadığımı Biliyorum) directed by Cenk Ertürk.
- Letter (Turkish: Mektup) directed by Göktan Göktaş.

=== National Documentary Film Programmes ===
==== National Documentary Film Competition Jury ====
- Ali Karadoğan
- Emel Çelebi
- Kurtuluş Özgen
- Necla Algan
- Thomas Balkenhol

==== Films in programme ====
A pre-selection jury consisting of Ahmet Gürata, Bülent Özkam and Ersan Ocak selected 7 student and 11 professional documentaries to compete in the National Documentary Film Competition. Also 2 documentaries were selected to be shown out of competition.

===== Student films in competition =====
- My Father Is Making History (Turkish: Babam Tarih Yapıyor) directed by Haydar Demirtaş.
- Autumn in Bayrampasa (Turkish: Bayrampaşa'da Sonbahar) directed by Cem Terbiyeli.
- Gülay Master (Turkish: Gülay Usta) directed by Selin Altay.
- Nasty Age (Turkish: Kahpe Devran) directed by Cahit Çeçen.
- Mada directed by Musa Ak.
- Life Birds (Turkish: Müebbet Kuşları) directed by Hüdai Ateş.
- Urbanbugs directed by Aykut Alp Ersoy.

===== Professional films in competition =====
- ...Leaving Behind (Turkish: …Göç) directed by Mehmet Özgür Candan.
- One Step Beyond (Turkish: Bir Adım Ötesi) directed by Tülin Dağ.
- A Philately Story (Turkish: Bir Filateli Öyküsü) directed by Ümit Topaloğlu.
- Daredevils (Turkish: Canıyla Oynayanlar) directed by Serdar Güven.
- Dream Gang (Turkish: Hayal Çetesi) directed by Seyfettin Tokmak and Kenan Kavut.
- While Everyone Else Sleeps (Turkish: Herkes Uyurken) directed by Erdem Murat Çelikler.
- İfakat directed by Orhan Tekeoğlu.
- Offside (Turkish: Ofsayt) directed by Reyan Tuvi.
- My Letter to Pippa (Turkish: Pippa'ya Mektubum) directed by Bingöl Elmas.
- Selahattin's Istanbul (Turkish: Selahattin'in Istanbul'u) directed by Aysim Türkmen.
- Brutal Consciences (Turkish: Taşlaşan Vicdanlar) directed by Cenk Örtülü and Zeynel Koç.

===== Out of competition screenings =====
- We Won’t Let You Touch Our Water (Turkish: Kanımızı Veririz Suyumuzu Vermeyiz) directed by Cihat Bilen.
- Your Son, Erdal (Turkish: Oğlunuz Erdal) directed by Tunç Erenkuş.

== See also ==
- 2011 in film
- Turkish films of 2011
