= 16th Festival on Wheels =

- Official Festival Poster
- Location: Ankara, Artvin & Ordu, Turkey
- Awards: Golden Bull
- Festival date: December 3–19, 2010
- Website: http://www.festivalonwheels.org/festival_on_wheels.aspx?page=festival_16

Festival on Wheels
- 15th

The 16th Festival on Wheels (Turkish: 16 Gazici Festival) was a film festival held in Ankara, Turkey from December 3 to 9, 2010; Artvin, Turkey from December 10 to 16, 2010; and Ordu, Turkey from December 17 to 19, 2010. A selection of films was screened at Kızılay Büyülü Fener theater and the Goethe Institut in Ankara, and the Ahmet Hamdi Tanpınar cultural centre in Artvin with the theme of Coup d’Etat! to commemorate the 30th anniversary year of the 1980 Turkish coup d'état.

== 2010 Golden Bull Awards ==
The Golden Bull awards were handed out for the second year running to the best films of the 16th Festival on Wheels as selected by the festival jury.

- Golden Bull: Illegal (French: Illégal) directed by Olivier Masset-Depasse
- Silver Bull: Chongqing Blues (pinyin: Rizhao Chongqing) directed by Xiaoshuai Wang
- Special Mention: Hair (Turkish: Saç) directed by Tayfun Pirselimoğlu
- SİYAD Award: Bibliothèque Pascal directed by Szabolcs Hajdu

== Programs ==
=== Golden Bull Film Competition ===
Nine nominees, including two Turkish features, were selected to compete for the Golden Bull during the Artvin leg of this edition of the festival.

==== Films in competition ====
- Illegal (French: Illégal) directed by Olivier Masset-Depasse
- Chongqing Blues (pinyin: Rizhao Chongqing) directed by Xiaoshuai Wang
- The Temptation of St. Tony (Estonian: Püha Tõnu Kiusamine) directed by Veiko Õunpuu
- Pál Adrienn directed by Ágnes Kocsis
- Bibliothèque Pascal directed by Szabolcs Hajdu
- October (Spanish: Octubre) directed by Daniel & Diego Vega
- Mundane History (Thai: เจ้านกกระจอก, Jao Nok Krajok) directed by Anocha Suwichakornpong
- Majority (Turkish: Çoğunluk) directed by Seren Yüce
- Hair (Turkish: Saç) directed by Tayfun Pirselimoğlu

=== Special Screenings ===
Two international features were selected to be shown out of competition in special pre-release screenings.

- Somewhere directed by Sofia Coppola
- Socialism (French: Film Socialisme) directed by Jean-Luc Godard

=== Turkish Cinema 2010 ===
Five Turkish features made in the preceding year were selected to be shown out of competition in the national showcase.

- Merry-Go-Round (Turkish: Atlıkarınca) directed by İlksen Başarır
- Toll Booth (Turkish: Gişe Memuru) directed by Tolga Karaçelik
- Tales From Kars (Turkish: Kars Öyküleri) directed by Özcan Alper, Ülkü Oktay, Emre Akay, Ahu Öztürk & Zehra Derya Koç
- Black and White (Turkish: Siyah Beyaz) directed by Ahmet Boyacıoğlu
- Zephyr (Turkish: Zefir) directed by Belma Baş

=== Lives into Line! ===
Six international films were selected for this special section, timed to commemorate the 30th anniversary of the 1980 Turkish coup d'état, examining the impact of military coups in Turkey, Portugal, Chile, Argentina, Brazil and Greece.

- 48 directed by Susana de Sousa Dias
- The Year My Parents Went on Vacation (Portuguese: O Ano em Que Meus Pais Saíram de Férias) directed by Cao Hamburger
- Missing directed by Costa Gavras
- The Judge and the General directed by Elizabeth Farnsworth & Patricio Lanfranco
- The International (Turkish: Beynelmilel) directed by Sırrı Süreyya Önder & Muharrem Gülmez
- September 12 (Turkish: 12 Eylül) directed by Özlem Sulak

=== Refugee in the City ===
Two international documentaries were selected for this special section about the consequences of urban regeneration projects for human lives as much as city plans.

- My House Stood in Sulukule (German: Mein Haus Stand In Sulukule) directed by Astrid Heubrandtner
- Paradise Hotel (Bulgarian: Hotel Rai) directed by Sophia Tzavella

=== A Time in the Country ===
One Turkish film was seşected for this special section which offers a grateful nod to the countryside and is supported by the publication of a collection of essays edited by Tül Akbal and Aslı Güneş under the same title.

- Vavien directed by Yağmur & Durul Taylan

== See also ==
- 2010 in film
- Turkish films of 2010
