= Yücesoy =

Yücesoy is a surname, likely of Turkish origin. Notable people with the surname include:

- Alican Yücesoy (born 1982), Turkish actor, screenwriter, and director
- Işıl Yücesoy (born 1945), Turkish movie and theatre actress and singer
