= Jîn =

- Film poster
- Directed by: Reha Erdem
- Produced by: Atlantik Film; Mars Entertainment Group; Imaj
- Starring: Deniz Hasgüler; Onur Ünsal; Yildirim Simsek
- Release date: 15 March 2013
- Running time: 122 minutes
- Countries: Turkey; Germany

Jîn (Kurdish for "life") is a 2013 Turkish-German movie directed by Reha Erdem. The movie is about a Kurdish guerilla fighter who deserted her military unit aiming at leaving the conflict region (Eastern Turkey) for the city of İzmir.

== Plot ==
The movie opens with nature shots of clouds over the mountains in Turkey accompanied by heavy organ music. It seems to be fall time. The few minutes of the movie are shots of animals accompanied by the same music. A praying mantis is the first animal that appears, followed by a turtle, a grasshopper, the sounds of birds chirping, a male deer and a gecko. The sound of the chirping birds is the first "nature" sound heard in the film as opposed to the music which opens the film.

A woman appears behind the leaves of trees of the mountain forest. It is not easy to identify any of her characteristics other than the fact that she is wearing a red scarf on her head. The peace is suddenly disrupted by explosions and gunfire. The gecko and the snake go into hiding. Shots of people (later revealed to be the Kurdish guerrilla's living in the mountains) running away from the explosions and gunfire follow. The convoy vehicles from which the gunfire was coming from drive away. The Kurdish guerilla's are now more clearly in view and are seen wearing the same items of clothing (nude colored jumpers and boots). Night falls and the guerilla's are in a cave. This is the first point in the movie where human speech is first heard in the form of a Kurdish song:

My lovely mother

tell me how are you

regards to my father

and to my brothers.

Your father and I have grown old

life is bitter to us

enough sweetheart come back.

After singing this song, the main character (Jîn) is seen running away from the armed organization she was previously fighting and living in the caves with. She runs away in the cover of the dark. The reason for her fleeing is unknown. At approximately the 13 minute mark of the movie, Jîn's face is clearly revealed for the first time. She runs into the deer, decides not to shoot it, and the two make eye contact. Jîn is now wandering alone in the forest, searching for food. She hears a bird screeching (presumably a hawk), climbs into the tree its sounds are coming from, and goes to steal the bird's eggs from the nest. There are three eggs and although initially she plans on taking all three, she returns two and eats only one upon hearing the crying of the bird. It is as if they have a mutual understanding of each other's needs and they come to a compromise (Jîn needs to eat, the egg's belong to the bird). After eating her "meal" she is ready to climb back down to the forest floor and continue her journey on foot. However, she quickly climbs back upon seeing the Turkish soldiers coming into her area and setting up camp. One of the soldiers sings.

Were you the one who always cried and burned

I couldn't laught either in this world of lies

did you think I was happy

in a world that stole my life over nothing.

Oh in this world of lies, world of lies

in this world that fakes a smile to your face

you cried dear and I burned

I though the world would be how I wished it

I believed for no reason I was tricked over nothing

In this world that takes its color from the sky.

This is the second time in the movie there is human speech. Up to this point however, it has only been in the form of song. The soldiers are alerted by something and leave in a hurry.

Jîn, now safe, continues her journey. The first person she interacts with after being alone since fleeing the guerrillas is a shepherd boy. He gives her bread and calls her sister. She asks where the nearest village is and he points her in its direction. This is the first appearance of human speech in the movie. As she is walking away from him, someone fires shots at her (probably a Turkish soldier). The gecko appears again.

She sees a house in the distance and waits for its owners to leave. Upon seeing them leave in a green truck, she goes inside and starts taking items like clothes, food, books, and money. She is in a girls room indicated by the girls clothes and the framed picture on the desk. Jîn does not seems scared that she will be caught. Suddenly, inside the house, she hears an elderly woman calling for her granddaughter Leyla. Jîn talks to the grandmother and helps her take her medication. The grandmother believes that Jîn is her granddaughter Leyla. Jîn takes this opportunity to call her mother, telling her not to cry or worry. The grandmother calls from Leyla (Jîn) again for help to take her medication. In this moment, Jîn realizes that the grandmother does not remember just having taken her medication. Considering the home owners were just in the house, they probably gave the grandmother her medication. Jîn realizes that she accidentally gave the grandmother a double dose of medication. "Grandma, what have you done?" Jîn says before leaving.

With her new acquired items, Jîn changes her boots to the shoes she took from Leyla's house. Bombs start falling and Jîn runs for cover in a cave. She is not alone. There is a black bear in the cave with her, taking cover from the bombs too. The bombing ends and Jîn tells the bear " Its finished, don't fear". She gives the bear an apple and says "Bye, bye compadre". Jîn now sits alone, trying to read a geography book she took from the house. It is obvious she has some trouble reading. "Which part of the world do you live in? What part of Turkey do you live in?" the book reads. This is the first time in the movie that the audience learns where the movie is taking place (Turkey). This point of innocence and a failed attempt at reading indicate to the audience that although Jîn is very independent and tough, she is really just a young girl. She changes over to commoner clothes but still keeps her red scarf on her head. She goes to a river to fill her canteen and the shepherd boy who she had met earlier sees her and approaches her. Due to her new outfit, he doesn't recognize who she is and starts asking her "what a beautiful girl like her is doing all alone". It seems like he is about to take advantage of the situation but Jîn embarrass and intimidates him, yelling at him telling him who she is and how they had met earlier. She leaves him and continues her journey.

She runs into the bear again telling it "Sorry compadre, no more apples". The next scene shows her sitting alone in the dark, eating bread by a small fire. She is still in the mountainous forest and can hear the hawks over head. She tries to sleep but cannot. She continues her journey and comes upon a road. She sees a car coming and she hides in a ditch. A purple flower is shown. The next car that passes, she stands up to be seen. It seems that she wants to hitchhike but the car does not stop for her. She sleeps in the ditch, waiting for the next car. It is very windy. The snake appears again. A truck finally stops for her. It is green. The driver is an older man and they refer to each other as sister and brother. The driver asks her the reason for her travels, presumably she lies, saying that she is going to see her sick grandmother. The driver inquires more about her: says that she is from Varaptil, reveals her age, she does not have a dad and that her name is Leyla. The truck driver laughs at the irony that his daughter is also named Leyla. (The audience may presume at this point that the truck driver is from the same house, Jîn was in earlier with the sick grandmother). The driver drops her off at her destination and gives her a chocolate. Jîn tells the driver to say hi to Leyla for her. It is windy and the snake is shown again.

Jîn gets on a bus with other people. In their journey, the soldiers stop them asking passengers where they are going. Jîn seems afraid and mimics the response of the other passengers: she is going to go work. A woman on the bus asks Jîn if she ran away from home. Jîn says she is going to visit her sick grandmother. The two exchange a mutual smile as if they both understand the true reason. Ironically, Jîn does end up going to work to make money for a bus ticket. She is with the same woman from the bus. It is at this point in the film (approximately the half way mark) when Jîn first reveals her name. The woman's name is Zivar (which means ornament or jewelry). Jîn shares her chocolate with Zivar. The truck Jîn, Zivar, and the other workers are on finally arrives at the work field. The boss there tells the group that women hoe for 25 liras a day and men break rocks for 35 liras a day. When the man asks Jîn for her papers, she says she forgot them at home. Zivar backs her up by lying that Jîn is the neighbor's daughter. The man seems to believe the lie. In order for Jîn to make money for her bus ticket quickly, she asks to break rocks instead. She lies to the man telling him that she wants to buy medication for her sick grandmother. She presents herself to him as 17 year old Leyla. The man allows her to break rocks and tells her to come by his quarters later to pick up her payment. She works hard for the next days breaking rocks. The task is difficult for her but she does not give up. When she has worked as many days she needs to, to collect money for her bus ticket she goes to visit the man. He invites her to his home and serves her tea. Jîn, clearly uncomfortable and predicting what will happen (he will try to rape her) tries to not stay for too long, telling him she is only there for her payment. As soon as he gives her the money, he tries to rape her inside his home. She runs away and he chases behind her and catches up to her. He beats her briefly unconscious and starts dragging her back to his house. He rests for a second at which moment, Jîn wakes up, takes a rock and knocks him unconscious in the head. She runs away and goes to the bus station purchasing her ticket.

On the bus she sits next to a young girl who asks Jîn what happen to her face. Jîn's face has some cuts and bruises. Jîn responds by saying that a dog attacked her but she fought back, it got scared and ran away. Soldiers stop the bus, asking for IDs. Jîn is taken off the bus since she doesn't have one along with an old insisting that he just left it at home and can go get it if need be. The two get taken to a Turkish compound where they are questioned. She speaks only in Kurdish while the soldiers speak only Turkish. A Kurdish interpreter comes to speak for he. She says she is from Gevez. She is put in a holding cell along with the old man. A helicopter flies in carrying a wounded Kurdish guerrilla. He is put in the holding cell with her. It seems as if she recognizes him. He asks her to kill him, likely because he will be interrogated by the Turkish soldiers. Upon his request, Jîn kills him. While she is in the holding cell, bombs are falling outside. The Kurdish interpreter comes in and tries to violate her. However, because of the bombings, both she and the old man are released. She runs away but the Kurdish interpreter follows behind her. Eventually, she loses him.

She tries again to hitchhike but the cars don't stop for her. The turtle crosses the road. A car stops and two men get out. It seems that one of them is the Kurdish interpreter. Jîn runs away from them back into the mountains. In the mountains, she find a mule with an injured leg. The mule is carrying food. She takes the mule to the river, cleans and ties its wounds. She takes the food its carrying, takes the mules reins off and sets it free. As she is walking away from the mule, bombs start falling. She runs for cover and later discovered the mule has been killed by one of the bombs.

She returns to the cave where she initially started. She finds her geography book there. She sees a mountain tiger. Bombs start falling again, the purple flower is shown again. There is repeat imagery of the same scenario happening (bombs dropping) with Jîn in different locations. The different animals are also shown (bear, deer, snake etc.). The animals are shown as going into hiding when the bombs are being dropped. Also interesting to note is that despite all her travels, Jîn's white shoes are clean.

Jîn finds a wounded Turkish soldier and she takes care of him. They have a brief conversation. He tells Jîn he only has 7 months of active duty left, perhaps implying that what he is doing is out of requirement and not purely driven by desire. He tells her he comes from Çanakkale and his family (mother and siblings but no father). Upon saying that he never saw his father, Jîn get angry saying that they (likely Turkish soldiers) took her father away from her and she never saw him again. When the soldiers says "may he rest in peace", Jîn responds by saying "what peace? He has no peace". The next morning he leaves. He calls his mother to tell her that he is okay, Jîn also calls hers, telling her mother that she decided not to go (to İzmir).As a token of gratitude, the soldiers offers his cellphone to Jîn but she refuses it. He asks Jîn for her name and despite official hesitation, she eventually tells him. He is the second person in the film to know her true name.

As she continues on her journey, she starts getting shot at again. She climbs into a tree for safety but she is shot and falls from it. She is shown lying on a huge rock, blood stains her once clean white shoes. All the animals shown throughout the movie surround her (bear, mule, mountain lion, deer etc.). She seems alive but it is uncertain. The movie ends with a black screen.

== Cast ==
- Deniz Hasgüler as Jîn
- Onur Ünsal as Soldier
- Yildirim Simsek as Truck Driver
- Ayris Alptekin as Girl in the Photo
- Mahmut Altuner as Erdal
- Mehtap Anil as Grandmom
- Derya Aydin as Other Group Member
- Senay Aydin as Bus Girl's Mother
- Harun Baskan as Group Member on the Radio
- Serdar Bicimli as Office Worker
- Serkan Elmas as Soldier Carrying the Stretcher
- Burak Ersu as Soldier in the Van
- Recep Kaya as Guy in the Van
- Ercan Kilicarslan as Commander
- Mehmet Kurt as Old Man
- Aysegul Meral as Bus Girl
- Sedat Oguz as Second Guy in the Van
- Hacer Onel as Other Group Member

== Selected festivals and awards ==
- Brussels Film Festival, Belgium (2013): Cinelab Award for the Best Image
- Fünf Seen Film Festival, Germany (2013): Horizonte Human Rights Award
- Lessina Film Festival, Italy (2013): Best Feature Film
- Buster Film Festival, Denmark (2013): Best Youth Actor (Deniz Hasgüler)
- Let's CEE Film Festival, Austria (2013): Jury’ Special Mention
- Adana Golden Boll Film Festival, Turkey (2013): Best Director, Promising Actress Award (Deniz Hasgüler)
- Adelaide Film Festival, Australia (2013): Best Film Award
- 63rd Berlin International Film Festival, Germany (2013)
- !f Independent Film Festival, Turkey (2013)
- Nürnberg Turkey/Germany Film Festival, Germany (2013)
- Tribeca Film Festival, USA (2013)
