= Elit İşcan =

Turkish actress (born 1994)

- Born: 12 January 1994 (age 31); Istanbul, Turkey
- Occupation: Actress
- Years active: 2006–present

Elit İşcan (born 12 January 1994) is a Turkish actress. Her credits include the film Mustang and the television show Küçük Kadınlar. She has received the IFFI Best Actor Award (Female) at the 46th International Film Festival of India.

== Life and career ==
İşcan's father was an architect and her mother was a computer programmer. She has one sibling. She finished her studies at the Istanbul Kemer College. After Reha Erdem's visit to her school, she auditioned for the movie Beş Vakit and was cast in a supporting role, which marked her cinematic debut. With her role in the TV series Küçük Kadınlar she gained popularity. Later in 2008, she appeared in Reha Erdem's movie Hayat Var and portrayed the character Hayat. For this role, she was nominated for Cahide Sonku Best Performance by an Actress Award at the 42nd SİYAD Awards. In 2015, she had a leading role in Deniz Gamze Ergüven's movie Mustang. The film was selected as France's submission, and was nominated for, the Best Foreign Language Film at the 88th Academy Awards.

== Filmography ==
Year	Title	Role	Notes
2006	Beş Vakit	Yıldız	Promising Young Actress - 13th Altın Koza International Film Festival, 2006; Honorable Mention - 12th Nuremberg Turkey / Germany Film Festival, 2007
2008	Hayat Var	Hayat	Young Witch - 12th Flying Broom International Women's Film Festival, 2009; Best Young Talent - 3rd Yeşilçam Awards, 2010; Nomination – Cahide Sonku Best Performance by an Actress Award, SİYAD Awards, 2009
2008–2010	Küçük Kadınlar	Bilge Gezici	TV series
2009	Dersimiz: Atatürk	Küçük Afet İnan	
2009	Ölü Yaprak Vuruşu	Nurhan Güneyli	
2012	Taş Mektep	Mina	
2013	A.Ş.K.	Semra	TV series
2015	Mustang	Ece	21st Sadri Alışık Theater and Cinema Acting Awards Selection Committee Special Award
2019	Kurşun	Zeynep	TV series - Guest appearance on the first episode.
2019	Baumbacher Syndrome	Fida	
2021	Hamlet		Web series
