= Lost Freedom =

- Theatrical Poster
- Directed by: Umur Hozatlı
- Written by: Umur Hozatlı
- Produced by: Özlem Turan
- Starring: Serdar Kavak; Vedat Perçin; Öznur Kula; Musa Yıldırım; Aydın Orak
- Cinematography: Hüseyin Mazlum Karaman
- Edited by: Aytekin Birkon
- Music by: Nail Yurtsever
- Release date: 2010
- Running time: 91 minutes
- Country: Turkey
- Language: Turkish

Lost Freedom (Turkish: Kayıp Özgürlük) is a 2010 Turkish drama film, written and directed by Umur Hozatlı, about the relationship between the sister of a detained terror suspect and the son of the Turkish gendarmerie chief who has detained him. The film premiered out-of-competition at the 47th International Antalya Golden Orange Film Festival and was screened in-competition at the 22nd Ankara International Film Festival.

== Release ==
=== Festival screenings ===
- 47th International Antalya Golden Orange Film Festival (October 9–14, 2010)
- 22nd Ankara International Film Festival (March 17–27, 2011)

== See also ==
- Turkish films of 2010
