= Müezzin =

- Theatrical Poster
- Directed by: Sebastian Brameshuber
- Produced by: Sebastian Brameshuber; Gabriele Kranzelbinder
- Cinematography: Govinda Van Maele
- Edited by: Sebastian Brameshuber; Gökçe Ince
- Release date: July 4, 2009 (Karlovy Vary)
- Running time: 80 minutes
- Countries: Austria; Turkey
- Language: Turkish

Müezzin is a 2009 Austrian-Turkish documentary film directed by Sebastian Brameshuber about the annual Turkish competition for the best muezzin. The film was selected for the 29th International Istanbul Film Festival and 16th London Turkish Film Festival.

== Release ==
=== Festival screenings ===
- 44th Karlovy Vary International Film Festival (July 3–11, 2009)
- 15th Sarajevo International Film Festival (August 12–20, 2009)
- 29th International Istanbul Film Festival (April 3–18, 2010)
- 12th Buenos Aires International Film Festival (April 7–18, 2010)
- 16th London Turkish Film Festival (November 4–18, 2010)

== See also ==
- List of Islamic films
- 2009 in film
- Turkish films of 2009
