= Not Worth a Fig =

2009 film by Selda Çiçek

- Theatrical Poster
- Directed by: Selda Çiçek
- Written by: Selda Çiçek
- Produced by: Mehmet Çiçek
- Starring: Özgü Namal; Turgay Tanülkü; Veysel Diker; Barış Çakmak; Makbule Akbaş; Derya Durmaz; Onur Dikmen; Burcu Salihoğlu; Emrah Dönmez; Halil Yomak; Nalan Başaran; Sevinç Erol; Tuğçe Şenoğlu
- Cinematography: İlker Berke
- Edited by: Emrah Dönmez
- Music by: Özgür Yalçın; Serkan Alkan
- Production company: Çiçek Film
- Distributed by: Özen Film
- Release date: 6 November 2009
- Running time: 82 mins
- Country: Turkey
- Language: Turkish
- Box office: US$40,366

Not Worth a Fig (Turkish: İncir Çekirdeği) is a 2009 Turkish drama film written and directed by Selda Çiçek based on a true story about a woman unhappily married to her late sister's husband. The film, which went on nationwide release on November 6, 2009, was selected for the 16th London Turkish Film Festival.

== Synopsis ==
The plot focuses on one day in the life of a family and is centred on Heda, who is unhappily married to her late sister's husband. At the same time, Heda's mother Cemile is suffering from ever-deepening depression but no one even notices...or cares a fig.

== Release ==
=== General release ===
The film opened on general release in 20 screens across Turkey on November 6, 2009 at number fourteen in the Turkish box office chart with an opening weekend gross of US$12,554.

=== Festival screenings ===
- 16th London Turkish Film Festival (November 4–18, 2010)

== See also ==
- 2009 in film
- Turkish films of 2009
