= Serra Arıtürk =

Turkish actress and singer

- Born: 22 July 1998 (age 27); Istanbul, Turkey
- Education: Biomedical Engineering at Acıbadem Mehmet Ali Aydınlar University
- Occupations: Actress, singer
- Years active: 2019–present

Serra Arıtürk (born 22 July 1998) is a Turkish actress and singer.

== Life and career ==
Born in Istanbul on 22 June 1998, Arıtürk received guitar lessons from Hüsrev İsfendiyaroğlu. She later joined the Boğaziçi Jazz Choir as a singer. She completed her high school education at Private Denizatı Anatolian High School before pursuing her studies in Biomedical Engineering at Acıbadem Mehmet Ali Aydınlar University.

She released her first song "Kendimi Bilmeden" in 2019. Arıtürk has been influenced by the works of Amy Winehouse. In 2021, she starred as the lead actress in the TV series Aşkın Tarifi, which aired on Kanal D.

== Filmography ==
Film
Year	Title	Role	Notes	
2024	Güneşi Söndürmem Gerek	Umut	Leading role	
Television
Year	Title	Role	Notes	Network
2019	Uykusuzlar Kulübü	Herself	Program	TV100
2019	Genç Sahne	Herself	Contestant	TRT 1
2021	Aşkın Tarifi	Naz Soyluer	Leading role	Kanal D
2024	Taş Kağıt Makas	Alev Parlak	Leading role	Kanal D
TBD	Veliaht	Reyhan	Leading role	Show TV
Web series
Year	Title	Role	Notes	Platform
2022–2023	Kulüp	Keriman	Supporting role	Netflix
2024	Kuvvetli Bir Alkış	Ahu	Guest appearance	Netflix
2024	Asaf	Meltem	Supporting role	Netflix
TBD	Kaosun Anatomisi	Elif	Başrol oyuncusu	Max

== Diskography ==
Year	Song	Album	Notes
2019	Kendimi Bilmeden		Single
2020	Kimse Yok (with Osman Çetin)		Single
2020	Olmazdım		Single
