= Ankara Film Festival =

Annual film festival held in Ankara, Turkey

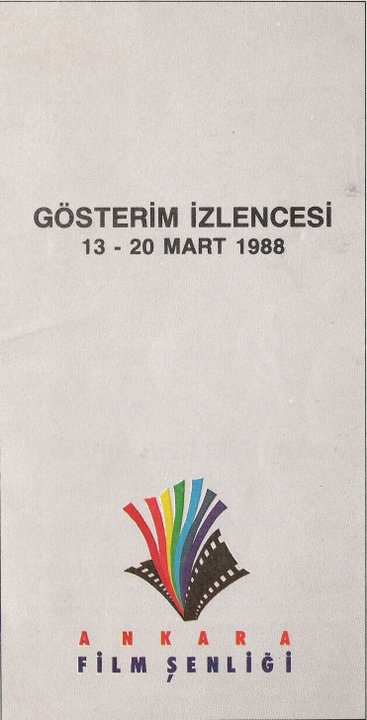
- Location: Ankara, Turkey
- Founded: 1988
- Language: International
- Website: filmfestankara.org.tr/en

Current: 34th Ankara Film Festival
- 35th 33rd

The Ankara Film Festival (Turkish: Ankara Film Festivali) is an international film festival in Turkey.

The 34th edition of the festival was held from November 2 to November 10, 2023. The Ankara Film Festival was first organized in 1988.

== See also ==
- 21st Ankara International Film Festival
- 22nd Ankara International Film Festival
