= Paper (film) =

- Promotional Poster
- Directed by: Sinan Çetin
- Written by: Sinan Çetin
- Produced by: Sinan Çetin
- Starring: Öner Erkan; Asuman Dabak; Ayşen Gruda; Ahmet Mekin; Zeynep Beşerler; Uğur Bilgin
- Music by: Fırat Yükselir
- Release dates: October 2010 (Antalya); January 14, 2011 (Turkey)
- Country: Turkey
- Language: Turkish
- Box office: US$103,964

Paper (Turkish: Kağıt) is a 2010 Turkish comedy-drama film directed by Sinan Çetin, which tells the story of a young director trying to make his first film. The film, which went on nationwide general release across Turkey on January 14, 2011, was premiered in competition at the 47th International Antalya Golden Orange Film Festival (October 9–14, 2010). Director won Best Director award in 12th Dhaka International Film Festival.

== Plot ==
Emrah is a dreamer who hopes to be a great director, trying to shoot his first feature film. His father Mehdi, a retired customs enforcement officer, believes that Emrah is going to become a pharmacist. Emrah manages to cobble together funding from producers with the help of his friends and his mother Şahane, but is held up by the bureaucracy. The main obstacle between him and his dreams is an endorsement letter he needs from Müzeyyen, the head of the censorship board. But this proves more difficult than he expected...

Standing up to authority in pursuit of his ideals, this young man finds himself entangled in a vehement struggle against this petty official who blindly enforces a senseless law.

== Release ==
=== General release ===
The film opened on nationwide general release in 86 screens across Turkey on January 14, 2011 at number 8 in the national box office with a first weekend gross of $54,815.

=== Festival screenings ===
- 47th Antalya "Golden Orange" International Film Festival (October 9–14, 2010)

== Reception ==
=== Box office ===
The film has been in the Turkish national box office charts for two weeks and has made a total gross of US$103,964.

== See also ==
- Turkish films of 2010-2011
