= Asude Kalebek =

Turkish actress

- Born: Asude Selma Kalebek; 18 June 1999 (age 27); Adana, Turkey
- Education: Boğaziçi University
- Occupation: Actress
- Years active: 2021–present

Asude Selma Kalebek (born 18 June 1999) is a Turkish actress known for The Club.

== Her life and career ==
Kalebek, who continues her education at Istanbul Boğaziçi University, played the lead character Raşel in The Club, one of Netflix's Turkish TV series, as her first project in 2021.

She subsequently played the leading character, Naz, in the drama, Sakla Beni.

== Filmography ==
Television
Year	Title	Role	Notes	Network
2023–2024	Sakla Beni	Naz Ertekin	Leading role	Star TV
2026	A.B.İ.	Melek Hancıoğlu	Leading role	atv
Web
Year	Title	Role	Notes	Platform
2021–2023	The Club	Raşel Aseo	Leading role	Netflix
2025	Var Bunlar	Burcu	Guest appearance	TOD TV
