= Mommy, I'm Scared =

Korkuyorum Anne (Mommy, I'm Scared!)
- Directed by: Reha Erdem
- Written by: Reha Erdem Nilüfer Güngörmüş
- Starring: Ali Düşenkalkar; Işıl Yücesoy; Şenay Gürler; Köksal Engür
- Release date: March 17, 2004
- Running time: 128 minutes
- Country: Turkey
- Language: Turkish

Korkuyorum Anne! (English title: Mommy, I'm Scared!) is a 2004 Turkish comedy film written and directed by Reha Erdem. An alternate title for the film is İnsan nedir ki? (What is a human anyway?).

== Main cast ==
- Ali Düşenkalkar as Ali
- Turgay Aydın as Keten
- Şenay Gürler as İpek
- Işıl Yücesoy as Neriman
- Arzu Bazman as Omit
- Köksal Engür as Rasih

== Reception ==
The film was "a multilayered comedy with stories of different masculinities, teasing the rituals of coming of age for men." It is also noted for its approach to the age between adolescence and adulthood.

Awards
Preceded by Mustafa Hakkında Her Şey	Golden Orange; Behlül Dal Jury Special Award; 2005	Succeeded by Ufuk Bayraktar
