= Times and Winds =

- Directed by: Reha Erdem
- Written by: Reha Erdem
- Produced by: Ömer Atay
- Cinematography: Florent Herry
- Edited by: Reha Erdem
- Music by: Arvo Pärt
- Distributed by: Atlantik Film
- Release date: 2006
- Running time: 111 minutes
- Country: Turkey
- Language: Turkish

Times and Winds or (Turkish: Beş Vakit) is a 2006 Turkish drama film directed and written by Reha Erdem. The film premiered in the United States on January 11, 2008. It won the Best Turkish Film of the Year Award at the Istanbul International Film Festival.

== Plot ==
In a small village in the mountains overlooking the sea the people struggle to survive on a daily basis. Their lives, like those of their ancestors, follow the rhythms of the earth, air and water, of day and night and the seasons, with days divided into five parts by the call to prayer. Childhood is difficult and a father typically has a preference of one son over the other. Ömer, the son of the Imam, is such a victim of his father's dislike and he wishes for the death of his father. When his wish is not granted he begins to look for ways to kill him as a twelve-year-old boy might think of with his friend Yakup. Yakup seeing his father sexually interested in his teacher also develops a hatred of his father in the same way and as the children grow up they are riddled between guilt and love and hate for their fathers.

== Cast ==
- Taner Birsel as Zekeriya
- Nihan Aslı Elmas as Yıldız's Mother
- Köksal Engür as Halil Dayi
- Sevinç Erbulak as Yakup's Mother
- Selma Ergeç as The Teacher
- Elit İşcan as Yıldız
- Ali Bey Kayalı as Yakup
- Yiğit Özşener as Yusuf
- Tilbe Saran as Ömer's Mother
- Tarık Sönmez as Shepherd Davut
- Cüneyt Türel as Grandfather
- Bülent Yarar as Imam

Awards
Preceded by Anlat İstanbul	Golden Boll Award for Best Picture; 2006	Succeeded by Beynelmilel
