= Turquoise (film) =

- Theatrical Poster
- Directed by: Kadir Balcı
- Written by: Kadir Balcı
- Produced by: Dirk Impens; Gülin Üstün
- Starring: Burak Balcı; Charlotte Vandermeersch; Nihat Alptuğ Altınkaya; Tilbe Saran; Sinan Vanden Eynde; Hilal Sönmez
- Cinematography: Ruben Impens
- Edited by: Nico Leunen
- Music by: Bert Ostyn
- Production companies: MMG Film & TV Production
- Distributed by: MMG Film & TV Production
- Release date: 6 November 2009
- Countries: Belgium; Turkey
- Languages: Dutch; Turkish

Turquoise (Turkish: Turkuaze; Dutch: Turquaze) is a 2009 Belgian-Turkish drama film written and directed by Kadir Balcı about the identity crisis experienced by three Turkish brothers who return to the Belgian city of Ghent after they bury their father in Istanbul. The film, which went on nationwide release across Belgium on 29 September 2010, was selected for the 16th London Turkish Film Festival.

== Production ==
The film was shot on location in Istanbul, Turkey and Ghent, Belgium.

== Release ==
=== General release ===
The film opened on general release in 9 screens across Belgium on 6 November 2009 at number twelve in the national box office chart with an opening weekend gross of US$63,177.

=== Festival screenings ===
- 16th London Turkish Film Festival (4–18 November 2010)

== See also ==
- 2010 in film
- Turkish films of 2010
