= Teoman Kumbaracıbaşı =

Argentine-Turkish actor

- Born: 18 October 1971 (age 54); Argentina
- Occupation: Actor
- Years active: 2004–present

Teoman Kumbaracıbaşı (born 18 October 1971) is an Argentine-Turkish actor. He has appeared in more than twenty films since 2004.

== Selected filmography ==
Year	Title	Role	Notes
2010	Signora Enrica	Giovanni	
2004	Toss-Up	Teoman	
2012	Bir Zamanlar Osmanlı: Kıyam		
2016	Kordüğüm	Murat	
2020	Doğduğun ev Kaderindir	Burhan	
2021	Kuruluş Osman	Kara Şaman Togay	
2021–2022	Destan	Balamir Bey	
2024	Kudüs Fatihi Selahaddin Ayyubi	Tacir Rakif	
2024	Mehmed: Fetihler Sultanı	Murad II	
