= Resurrecting: The Street Walker =

- DVD Cover
- Directed by: Özgür Uyanık
- Written by: Özgür Uyanık
- Produced by: Ian Prior; Özgür Uyanık
- Starring: James Powell; Tom Shaw; Lorna Beckett; Gregory Duke
- Cinematography: Paul Englefield
- Edited by: Özgür Uyanık
- Production companies: 2nd Floor Productions; Scala Productions
- Distributed by: Kaleidoscope
- Release date: 7 October 2009 (London)
- Running time: 80 mins
- Country: United Kingdom
- Language: English

Resurrecting: The Street Walker is a 2009 British horror film written and directed by Özgür Uyanık. Its plot concerns an ambitious young filmmaker who discovers an abandoned and incomplete horror movie from the 1980s and decides to finish it. The film premiered at the 2009 Raindance Film Festival where it was nominated Best UK Feature and was selected for the Istanbul International Film Festival and the 16th London Turkish Film Festival, amongst others.

== Release ==
=== Festival screenings ===
- 2009 Raindance Film Festival (30 September – 11 October 2009)
- 16th London Turkish Film Festival (4–18 November 2010)

== See also ==
- 2009 in film
- British films of 2009
