= Gökçe Bahadır =

Turkish actress

- Born: 9 November 1981 (age 44); Istanbul, Turkey
- Occupations: Actress, Singer
- Years active: 2003–present
- Spouse(s): Ali Sunal (m. 2011; div. 2012) Emir Ersoy (m. 2022)

Gökçe Bahadır (born 9 November 1981) is a Turkish film and television actress. She is best known for her spectacular performances as Matilda in the web series Kulüp, Gamze in the series Ömer, Leyla Tekin in the series Yaprak Dökümü (based on the classic novel by Reşat Nuri Güntekin), and as Yeliz in the hit youth series Hayat Bilgisi. She has starred in numerous other series including Kayıp Şehir, Ufak Tefek Cinayetler, Aramızda Kalsın, Adı Efsane, and Dedemin İnsanları. In 2021, she played lead role in the TV series Evlilik Hakkında Her Şey, an adaptation of the British TV series The Split.

== Credits ==
Film
Year	Title	Role	Note
2004	Yol Palas Cinayeti		TV film
2009	Hırçın Kız Kadife	Kadife	TV film
2011	Dedemin İnsanları	Nurdan	
2012	Çember		Short film
2015	Bana Masal Anlatma	Neriman	
2016	Aşk Uykusu	Yonca	Leading role
2022	Kendi Yolumda	Zeynep	Leading role
Web series
Year	Title	Role	Note
2021–2023	Kulüp	Matilda Aseo	Leading role
Television series
Year	Title	Role	Note
2001	Tatlı Hayat	Fulden	
2002	Beşik Kertmesi		
2003	Mühürlü Güller	Okşan	
2003–2005	Hayat Bilgisi	Törpü Yeliz	
2005	Yine de Aşığım		
2006–2010	Yaprak Dökümü	Leyla Tekin	Leading role
2011	Sensiz Olmaz	Begüm	Supporting role
2012–2013	Kayıp Şehir	Aysel	Leading role
2013–2015	Aramızda Kalsın	Yadigâr	Leading role
2015–2016	Hatırla Gönül	Gönül Çelik	Leading role
2017	Adı Efsane	Bahar Öğretmen	Leading role
2017–2018	Ufak Tefek Cinayetler	Dr. Oya Toksöz	Leading role
2020	Menajerimi Ara	Herself	Guest appearance
2021–2022	Evlilik Hakkında Her Şey	Azra Cevher	Leading role
2023–2024	Ömer	Gamze Sağlam	Leading role
Theatre
Year	Title	Role	Note
2011	5'er Beşer	Azize	
2014–2015	Kuru Sıkı		
2017	Broadway'den İstanbul'a Müzikaller		
2020	İzmir'in Kızları		
Dubbing
Year	Title	Role	Note
2009	Alvin ve Sincaplar 2	Brittany	
Commercials
Year	Title	Role	Note
2010	"Penti"	Gökçe	
2010	"Zeytin"		
2017	"Gliss"	Herself	
2020	"Alfemo"	Herself	

== Discography ==
Year	Song	Album	Notes
2015	Seni Kimler Aldı		Live performance CNN Türk
2016	Bana Yalan Söylediler	feat. Tuluğ Tırpan	
2016	Vazgeçtim	feat. Tuluğ Tırpan	JoyTurk acoustic
2016	Düşünme Hiç	feat. Tuluğ Tırpan	Six Pack Ajda Pekkan cover
2017	Medcezir		Ufak Tefek Cinayetler soundtrack
2018	Sana Doğru	Aykut Gürel Presents: Gökçe Bahadır	
2018	Gönül Penceresinden	Aykut Gürel Presents: Gökçe Bahadır	
2018	Aşk Kanunu	Aykut Gürel Presents: Gökçe Bahadır	
2018	Sensiz Olmaz	Aykut Gürel Presents: Gökçe Bahadır	
2018	Neye Yarar	Aykut Gürel Presents: Gökçe Bahadır	
2018	İçime Sinmiyor	Aykut Gürel Presents: Gökçe Bahadır	
2018	Sen Yarattın Beni	Aykut Gürel Presents: Gökçe Bahadır	
2018	Of Aman Aman	Aykut Gürel Presents: Gökçe Bahadır	
2018	Çaresizim	Aykut Gürel Presents: Gökçe Bahadır	
2018	Hayırdır İnşallah	Aykut Gürel Presents: Gökçe Bahadır	
2021	Bu Kaçıncı Sonbahar		Tuna Kiremitçi & Gökçe Bahadır
2021	Hepsi Senin Mi ft		Emir Ersoy
