= Other Angels =

2010 Turkish drama film

- Theatrical Poster
- Directed by: Emre Yalgın
- Written by: Zeynep Özcan; Emre Yalgın
- Produced by: Mehmet Ali Arslan; Emre Yalgın
- Starring: Kanbolat Görkem Arslan; Özay Fecht; Ayta Sözeri; Buse Kılıçkaya; Seyhan Arman; Zeynep özcan; Didem Soylu; Müfit Aytekin
- Cinematography: Seçkin Savaş
- Edited by: Emrah Dönmez; Andreas Treske
- Music by: Özgür Şener
- Production companies: SFR Film; Logos Filmmaking
- Distributed by: Özen Film
- Release date: December 17, 2010
- Running time: 96 minutes
- Country: Turkey
- Language: Turkish

Other Angels (Turkish: Teslimiyet) is a 2010 Turkish drama film, directed by Emre Yalgın, which follows the lives of four transgender sex workers living together in the underbelly of Istanbul. The film, which went on nationwide general release across Turkey on December 17, 2010, was shown at the 22nd Ankara International Film Festival (March 17 to 27, 2011).

== Plot ==
Sanem (Didem Soylu) is a prostitute who shares the same flat with three transvestites in Istanbul. Every day she dreams of a savior who will one day take her away from this life. One day a young man named Gökhan (Kanbolat Görkem Arslan) moves into the neighborhood, and soon Sanem attracts his attention. Sanem has to move out of her shared flat because of a number of problems that arise with her flatmates and she moves in with Gökhan. This will be the beginning of a journey during which both will question each other's reliability and their choices in life.

== See also ==
- 2010 in film
- Turkish films of 2010
