= Merry-Go-Round (2010 film) =

- Theatrical Poster
- Directed by: İlksen Başarır
- Written by: İlksen Başarır; Mert Fırat
- Starring: Mert Fırat; Nergis Öztürk; Zeynep Oral; Semra Çeyrekbaşı; Sercan Badur; Oğulcan Güler
- Cinematography: Hayk Kirakosyan
- Release date: October 2010 (Antalya)
- Country: Turkey
- Language: Turkish

Merry-Go-Round (Turkish: Atlıkarınca) is a 2010 Turkish drama film directed by İlksen Başarır, which tells the story of a family dealing with incest. The film, which is the second collaboration between writer-director İlksen Başarır and co-writer Mert Fırat following the former's award-winning directorial debut film Love in Another Language (Turkish: Başka Dilde Aşk), was selected for the 47th Antalya "Golden Orange" International Film Festival.

== Plot ==
Erdem and Sevil live in a small town with their two kids, Edip and Sevgi, until they are forced to move to Istanbul to look after Sevil's mother who has become paralyzed. Ten years later, Edip is away at boarding school, disconnected from family life. Erdem still has the same dream: to become a successful writer...

Noticing that her daughter has suddenly become withdrawn and unhappy, Sevil begins to question some of what is going on at home, and discovers a secret behind closed doors. Erdem's death in a traffic accident will reveal further secrets within the family. Each member of this small family is faced with truths that they will have to bear on their own for the rest of their lives.

== Release ==
=== Festival screenings ===
- 47th Antalya "Golden Orange" International Film Festival (October 9–14, 2010)
- 16th Festival on Wheels (December 3–19, 2010)

== See also ==
- Turkish films of 2010
