= Sakla Beni =

- Genre: Drama Romance
- Created by: Gülseren Budayıcıoğlu
- Directed by: Nadim Güç
- Starring: Uraz Kaygılaroğlu; Cemre Baysel; Asude Kalebek
- Composer: Güldiyar Tanrıdağlı
- Country of origin: Turkey
- Original language: Turkish
- No. of seasons: 1
- No. of episodes: 26

Production
- Producer: Onur Güvenatam
- Production location: Istanbul
- Production company: OGM Pictures

Original release
- Network: Star TV
- Release: 2 November 2023 – 2 May 2024

Sakla Beni (trans. Lost in Love) is a Turkish television series in the drama romance genre, set to release with its premiere episode on 2 November 2023. It is produced by OGM Pictures, directed by Nadim Güç, and the screenplay is written by Armağan Gülşah and Nergis Otluoğlu Akoğlu. The main cast includes Uraz Kaygılaroğlu, Cemre Baysel, and Asude Kalebek.

== Plot ==
Mete and Naz come from rich and powerful families, so they are used to getting whatever they want. They were promised to each other when they were kids, and now they're going to get married because they cannot imagine being apart.

But things get complicated when Naz's longtime maid, Incila, shows up and meets Mete. This makes Mete start to question the choices that he has made in his life.

== Cast and characters ==
Actor	Character
Uraz Kaygılaroğlu	Mete
Cemre Baysel	İncila
Asude Kalebek	Naz
Baran Bölükbaşı	Kadir
Leya Kırşan	Melisa
Şenay Gürler	Belgin
Ceyda Düvenci	Filiz
Nilüfer Açıkalın	Gülten
Sevinç Erbulak	Füsun
Gökşen Ateş	Tansu
Kamil Güler	İzzet
Nizam Namidar	Atıf
Sera Tokdemir	Fahrünisa
Edip Saner	Bahri
Açelya Devrim Yılhan	Müberra
Sıla Korkmaz	Emine
Emine Şans Umar	Cemile
Tamer Levent	Kont Ziya
Gülçin Santırcıoğlu	Ifakat Korhan
Öznur Serçeler	Asuman Korhan
Abodi Nadir	Emir Korhan

== Episodes ==
=== Series overview ===
Series	Episodes	Originally released	
Series	Episodes	First released	Last released
1	26	2 November 2023	2 May 2024

=== Season 1 (2023) ===
No.	Title	Directed by	Written by	Original release date
1	"Episode"	Nadim Güç	Armağan Gülşah	2 November 2023
The day Naz has longed for since her childhood has arrived – Mete is returning from abroad to get married. However, this news brings heartache to Incila, who has grown up with Naz and shares the same love in her heart. Little do they know, life has even greater challenges in store for them.
2	"Episode"	Nadim Güç	Armağan Gülşah	9 November 2023
İncila has a long-time crush on Mete from childhood. While sharing special moments with him, she tries to keep her identity a secret and prevent Naz from finding out. Mete, engaged to Naz, is intrigued by a mysterious girl, making him question his relationship. As İncila decides to reveal the truth, they're unaware it could lead to a big problem.
3	"Episode"	Nadim Güç	Armağan Gülşah	16 November 2023
İncila narrowly escapes being caught by Naz while with Mete, intensifying the secrecy of their budding relationship. Family issues and trust problems create a crisis for Naz and Mete. Feeling unsupported, Naz breaks off the engagement, unknowingly setting the stage for a bigger crisis. As Mete grows closer to the mysterious girl, İncila, who shares his feelings, grapples with the pain of their impossible love. Their love deepens amid life's storms, but family members nearly expose them during a shared special day. As Mete prepares to announce a critical decision, a hidden truth emerges, threatening to unravel all his plans.
4	"Episode"	Nadim Güç	Armağan Gülşah	23 November 2023
As Mete reveals his decision to break up with Naz, the discovery of Incila's true identity shocks him. Despite feeling deceived, Mete stuns everyone by announcing he wants to marry Naz. Gülten, opposed to the union, imposes a surprising condition. A mix-up during the henna night brings the conflicted couple together. Unable to tolerate Mete's accusations, Incila takes a risky step to expose their secret relationship.
5	"Episode"	Nadim Güç	Armağan Gülşah	30 November 2023

== Ratings ==
=== Season 1 ===
Episode	Total Rating	Total Rank	AB Rating	AB Rank	ABC1 Rating	ABC1 Rank
Episode 1	2.95	12.	2.66	8.	3.11	9.
Episode 2	3.81	8.	2.75	6.	3.90	6.
Episode 3	4.27	6.	2.87	7.	4.16	5.
Episode 4	4.90	4.	3.86	4.	4.46	
Episode 5						

== See also ==
- Television in Turkey
- List of Turkish television series
- Turkish television drama
