= Oblivious (film) =

- Directed by: Ozgur Uyanik
- Written by: Ozgur Uyanik
- Produced by: Simon Watson
- Starring: Matthew Ashforde; Sienna Guillory; Terry Alderton
- Cinematography: Ed Mash
- Distributed by: Short Film Bureau
- Release date: 27 January 2001
- Running time: 11 minutes
- Country: United Kingdom
- Language: English
- Budget: £12,000 (estimated)

Oblivious is a 2001 short film written and directed by Ozgur Uyanik. It won the Canal+ Prize for Best European Short Film at the Brussels European Film Festival, 2001.
