= The Club (Turkish TV series) =

Turkish TV series on Netflix

- Turkish: Kulüp
- Genre: Period drama
- Written by: Necati Şahin; Rana Denizer
- Directed by: Seren Yüce; Zeynep Günay Tan
- Starring: Gökçe Bahadır; Barış Arduç; Salih Bademci; Fırat Tanış; Metin Akdülger; Asude Kalebek
- Theme music composer: Ender Akay
- Composers: Ender Akay; Cem Ergunoğlu; Gökhan Mert Koral
- Country of origin: Turkey
- Original languages: Turkish; Ladino; Greek
- No. of seasons: 2
- No. of episodes: 20

Production
- Producer: Saner Ayar
- Running time: 50 minutes
- Production company: O3 Medya

Original release
- Network: Netflix
- Release: 5 November 2021 – 15 September 2023

The Club (Turkish: Kulüp) is a Turkish period drama television series directed by Seren Yüce and Zeynep Günay Tan and starring Gökçe Bahadır, Barış Arduç, Salih Bademci, Fırat Tanış, Metin Akdülger and Asude Kalebek. The show was released on Netflix on 5 November 2021, with season one consisting of 10 episodes, divided into two parts of 6 and 4 episodes respectively. Part 2 premiered on 6 January 2022. The second season premiered on 15 September 2023.

== Premise ==
Matilda, an ex-convict, works in one of the most prominent nightclubs of Istanbul in 1955. Trying to establish a good relationship with her daughter, Matilda struggles to keep her daughter Raşel away from Pera's troublemaker, Fıstık İsmet. Matilda also tries to stand against her boss Orhan, nightclub manager Çelebi and artist Selim.

== Plot ==
=== Season 1 ===
In 1950s Istanbul, Matilda Aseo is released from prison as part of a general amnesty after serving time for murder. A Sephardic Jew, she applies at the local Jewish center to migrate to Israel when the rabbi informs her about her daughter, Raşel, who was taken away from her as an infant and has been jailed for breaking into the Club Istanbul, a nightclub managed by Çelebi, prompting her to forego her departure. At the prison, Matilda runs into Çelebi, who demands that she work for him in the club, located in the Pera district, in exchange for Raşel's freedom and a place to stay. Raşel is initially hostile to Matilda, but opens up when her mother explains her past.

During the Second World War, Matilda belonged to a prominent business-minded family that was targeted by a discriminatory tax by ultranationalist Turks. Matilda had fallen in love with an ethnic Turkish employee named Mümtaz who later betrayed the location of their savings, leading to the arrest of Matilda's father, who later died in a labor camp, and her brother, who escaped to the United States. In revenge, Matilda fatally shot Mümtaz and was imprisoned, but not before realizing that she was pregnant. Angry at her daughter's father, she gave up Raşel to the care of the local Jewish orphanage.

Matilda realizes that she had met Çelebi before her imprisonment, and after confronting him, he reveals that he was Aziz, a servant who tried to warn the Aseos about Mümtaz's betrayal, only to be framed for theft and fired. Eventually, tensions between Matilda and Çelebi escalate until she chooses to stand up on behalf of her colleagues and demand better treatment from the club's owner, Orhan, who agrees to split the club's management between Çelebi, who retains control of the stage, and Matilda, who takes care of the backstage and the star singer, Selim Songür.

Raşel strikes up a relationship with an ethnic Turkish taxi driver named "Fıstık" İsmet, the estranged son of local gangster Ali Şeker, and is impregnated by him. Their relationship strains that between Raşel and Matilda, who opposes it, and after an argument Raşel moves out of Matilda's place to get married with İsmet.

Matilda realizes that Kürşat, Orhan's new business associate, was the ultranationalist for whom Mümtaz was working for, prompting her to warn Çelebi and Orhan. After another argument with Çelebi over his treatment of her, he opens up saying that his decision to employ her in the club was a part of his unrequited love for her before she was imprisoned, and that he also recognizes Kürşat from before. It is later revealed that Kürşat is scheming to seize control and Turkify the club after finding out that Orhan is actually an ethnic Greek, just like what he did with the Aseos' business.

Kürşat, with the help of Ali and his thugs instigate the Istanbul riots, destroying non-Turkish-owned stores along the Grand Avenue of Pera and attacking minorities they find. During the riots, Kürşat discovers Orhan's mother Mevhibe, who is hidden by Orhan after she experiences flashbacks from the Burning of Smyrna and starts speaking Greek in fits of dementia. After a struggle, Kürşat overpowers Orhan and prepares to kill him after telling him of his plans, but is bludgeoned by Mevhibe. As flames from the riots engulf their hideout, Orhan strangles Mevhibe in an act of mercy.

Outside, Raşel is caught up in the violence as İsmet, who tries to save her, is mauled by the rioters. She is rescued by Matilda just as her water breaks but is barred from entering the club, along with other refugees by a fearful doorkeeper. Çelebi overpowers the doorkeeper and rescues Matilda and her group, helping Raşel give birth and earning Matilda's trust.

=== Season 2 ===
Five years after the riots, Matilda and Çelebi run Club Istanbul and save up money to buy the club and make all its staff co-owners once Orhan is formally declared disappeared. The two become lovers and are engaged. Meanwhile, Raşel, struggles to raise her daughter Rana in İsmet's absence, while continuing to be haunted by her own father's murder by Matilda, straining their relations again. After Rana tells Çelebi that Raşel has been stealing again, he contacts Ali Şeker, now a slumlord, to convince İsmet to return to Istanbul, offering him a job as a bartender at the club. İsmet settles in as Rana's father, while Raşel converts to Islam, prompting a devastated Matilda to move in with Çelebi.

At the Club, Selim is framed and arrested for drugs charges by Keriman, an ambitious dancer who is also the lover of Fikret Kayalı, an unscrupulous developer who has been buying up properties vacated by non-Turks following the riots. Raşel sees Keriman planting cocaine in Selim's room, but stays silent. Desperate, Çelebi convinces Fikret to use his connections to arrange Selim's release at the cost of setting up a clandestine business partnership with Fikret.

During a performance, Selim is killed by a falling cage rigged by Keriman, who is then chosen by an unsuspecting Matilda to become his replacement. While playing backstage, Rana finds a diamond near the cage's levers, which Raşel recognizes was detached from Keriman's outfit which she wore on the night Selim was killed. Raşel confronts Keriman, who reminds her of her failure to stop Selim's arrest. She also tells Raşel of Fikret's secret partnership. Raşel then tells the staff about Fikret, prompting them to walk out in disgust. After Keriman tells her that Fikret is actually a puppet for his father, Matilda goes to Fikret's residence to speak with his father, but is shocked to encounter a disfigured Kürşat, who is plotting to buy the Club and demolish it. Regaining her composure, Matilda warns him to back off.

At Mümtaz's grave, Matilda apologizes to Raşel for killing her father. A moved Raşel reconciles with her and convinces the club's employees to return. Çelebi and Matilda then open the club to the general public and amateur performers. After watching Barış Manço perform at a matinee, Keriman realizes that her star is fading and prepares to escape. As Çelebi and Matilda celebrate, Kürşat arrives and orders their eviction, having discreetly secured the club's ownership. As the staff move out of the premises, Keriman arrives to pick up her things, but is confronted in her room by Raşel, who learns from Rana that she had flirted with İsmet. They are joined by Matilda, who then learns from Keriman of her killing of Selim, and from Raşel of her failure to report Keriman. Matilda corners Keriman, who then shoots her. Keriman is arrested and taken to prison, while Matilda exchanges wedding rings with Çelebi before absolving Raşel over Selim's death and dying in her arms.

After Matilda's funeral, a distraught Raşel lashes out at Rana and prepares to commit suicide, but is stopped by the spirit of Matilda, who reminds her of how she forgave her for her neglect, and assuring her that Rana will forgive her. Çelebi and the staff enter the club and hold a dinner for Matilda. As they celebrate, Kürşat arrives and orders them out, but is instead removed by Fikret, who stages a coup against him. When Fikret asserts his ownership of the club, Çelebi and the staff walk out, but are stopped by Raşel, who urges them to stay on at the club, while insisting to Fikret that he will never be welcome despite his ownership of the club. Anxious to keep the club open, Fikret agrees to maintain a professional relationship with them and leaves. Afterwards, Raşel takes Matilda's place at the communal table and is joined by Rana and İsmet. Shortly afterwards, they learn that the 1960 Turkish coup d'état has taken place, as Rana gazes at soldiers and tanks on the street.

== Episodes ==
Series overview
Season	Episodes	Originally released
Part 1	6	November 5, 2021
Part 2	4	January 6, 2022
Season 2	10	September 15, 2023

No. overall	No. in season	Title	Directed by	Written by	Original release date
Part 1
1	1	"Episode 1"	Zeynep Günay Tan	Necati Şahin & Rana Denizer	5 November 2021
2	2	"Episode 2"	Zeynep Günay Tan	Necati Şahin & Rana Denizer	5 November 2021
3	3	"Episode 3"	Zeynep Günay Tan	Necati Şahin & Rana Denizer	5 November 2021
4	4	"Episode 4"	Zeynep Günay Tan	Necati Şahin & Rana Denizer	5 November 2021
5	5	"Episode 5"	Seren Yüce	Necati Şahin & Rana Denizer	5 November 2021
6	6	"Episode 6"	Seren Yüce	Necati Şahin & Rana Denizer	5 November 2021
Part 2
7	1	"Episode 7"	Seren Yüce	Necati Şahin & Rana Denizer	6 January 2022
8	2	"Episode 8"	Seren Yüce	Necati Şahin & Rana Denizer	6 January 2022
9	3	"Episode 9"	Zeynep Günay Tan	Necati Şahin & Rana Denizer	6 January 2022
10	4	"Episode 10"	Zeynep Günay Tan	Necati Şahin & Rana Denizer	6 January 2022

== Cast and characters ==
=== Season 1 ===
- Gökçe Bahadır as Matilda Aseo, a Sephardi Jew and ex-convict working in a prominent nightclub of Istanbul.
- Barış Arduç as "Fıstık" İsmet Denizer, a taxi driver and Raşel's love interest.
- Asude Kalebek as Raşel Aseo, Matilda's daughter and İsmet's love interest.
- Salih Bademci as Selim Songür, the singer of the nightclub.
- Metin Akdülger as Orhan Şahin, the owner of the club.
- Suzan Kardeş, as Orhan's mother.
- Fırat Tanış as Çelebi, the manager of the club.
- Merve Şeyma Zengin as Tasula, the Turkish Greek friend of Raşel.
- Hülya Duyar, as İsmet's mother.
- İştar Gökseven as Ali Şeker, İsmet's father.
- Murat Garibağaoğlu as David.
- İlker Kılıç, as Mordo, fiancé of Raşel.
- Valeria Lakhina, as Diana, an Englishwoman working in the British embassy.
- Doğanay Ünal, as Bahtiyar.

=== Additional cast (Season 2) ===
- Ada Erma as Rana
- Halil Babür as Fikret
- Serra Arıtürk as Keriman

== Production ==
The name of the series was first announced to be Kod Adı: Kulüp by Netflix in October 2020, along with the lead cast Gökçe Bahadır, Barış Arduç, and Salih Bademci. In the same month it was reported that Fırat Tanış will also be cast for the show. In March 2021 journalist Birsen Altuntaş tweeted Ruhi Sarı, Suzan Kardeş and Hazım Körmükçü will be starring as supporting characters in the series. The series was produced by Saner Ayar, Ayşe Durmaz and the Turkish media company O3 Medya for Netflix and directed by Seren Yüce and Zeynep Günay Tan. A team composed of Ayşin Akbulut, Serkan Yörük, Bengü Üçüncü, Rana Denizer and Necati Şahin (lead writer) was the writing team for the series.

== Reception ==
The reception of the Turkish Jewish community to the series was generally positive. The depiction of the Jewish rituals, Ladino language and political topics such as Varlık Vergisi was especially praised by the community members. Also the depiction of taboo topics such as crypto-Greeks, anti-Greek sentiment in Turkey, and the Istanbul pogrom in 1955 (in part 2) was praised by the Greek Orthodox community members.
