= Signora Enrica =

- Theatrical poster
- Directed by: Ali İlhan
- Written by: Ali İlhan
- Produced by: Elvan Arca; Can Arca
- Starring: Claudia Cardinale; İsmail Hacıoğlu; Lavinia Longhi; Teoman Kumbaracıbaşı; Nilay Cennetkuşu; Fahriye Evcen; Bedia Ener; Sema Çeyrekbaşı; Murat Karasu
- Cinematography: Soykut Turan
- Edited by: Arzu Volkan
- Music by: Orhan Şallıel
- Production company: Ares Media
- Distributed by: Filmpot
- Release date: October 15, 2010
- Running time: 110 minutes
- Country: Turkey
- Languages: Turkish; Italian
- Budget: US$1,000,000 (estimated)

Signora Enrica (Turkish: Sinyora Enrica ile İtalyan Olmak) is a 2010 Italo-Turkish comedy-drama film, written and directed by Ali İlhan, starring Claudia Cardinale as an elderly Italian woman who takes in a young Turkish exchange student. The film, which is scheduled to go on nationwide general release across Turkey on February 25, 2011, was selected for the 47th International Antalya Golden Orange Film Festival.

== Production ==
The film was shot on location in Istanbul, Turkey and Rimini, Italy.

== Plot ==
Abandoned with a son by her husband years ago, Signora Enrica is notorious in her native Rimini for refusing to allow any men into her house ever since. She rents out rooms to female students, while also working as a tailor and at the market. She decides to make an exception to her age-old rule for Ekin, a Turkish student who comes to her house.

Though Ekin doesn't speak Italian, he falls in love with Valentina, another tenant in the house, and seeks ways of communicating with her. Signora Enrica teaches Ekin Italian, dancing, and the subtleties of Italian cuisine – in other words, everything he needs to know to reach out to Valentina. Signora Enrica's son Giovanni begins to begrudge his mother for giving a stranger the love she has denied everybody else for years.

== Cast ==
- Claudia Cardinale - Signora Enrica
- İsmail Hacıoğlu - Ekin
- Lavinia Longhi - Valentina
- Teoman Kumbaracıbaşı - Giovanni

== Release ==
=== Festival screenings ===
- 47th Antalya "Golden Orange" International Film Festival (October 9–14, 2010)

== See also ==
- Turkish films of 2010-2011
- 2010 in film
