= September 12 (film) =

- Directed by: Özlem Sulak
- Written by: Özlem Sulak
- Produced by: Özlem Sulak
- Cinematography: Özlem Sulak
- Edited by: Özlem Sulak
- Release date: August 12, 2010 (Locarno)
- Running time: 60 minutes
- Countries: Germany; Turkey
- Language: Turkish

September 12 (Turkish: 12 Eylül) is a 2010 German-Turkish documentary film, written, produced and directed by Özlem Sulak, which documents the accounts of survivors of the 1980 Turkish coup d'état. The film was selected for the 16th Festival on Wheels and the 63rd Locarno International Film Festival, where it premiered.

== Release ==
=== Festival screenings ===
- 63rd Locarno International Film Festival (September 9–19, 2010)
- 16th Festival on Wheels (December 9–19, 2010)

== See also ==
- 2010 in film
- Turkish films of 2010
