= Sleeping Princess (film) =

- Theatrical Poster
- Directed by: Çağan Irmak
- Written by: Çağan Irmak
- Produced by: Mustafa Oğuz
- Starring: Alican Yücesoy; Sevinç Erbulak; Ayşe Nil Şamlıoğlu; Genco Erkal; Işıl Yücesoy; Çağlar Çorumlu; Funda Şirinkal; Şevval Başpınar; Alican Ulusoy; Baran Ayhan
- Cinematography: Gökhan Tiryaki
- Music by: Redd
- Release dates: 4 October 2010 (London); 19 October 2010 (Turkey)
- Running time: 110 minutes
- Country: Turkey
- Language: Turkish

Sleeping Princess (Turkish: Prensesin Uykusu) is a 2010 Turkish comedy-drama film written and directed by Çağan Irmak about a librarian whose quiet life is changed by a new neighbour and her 10-year-old daughter. The film, which went on nationwide general release across Turkey on October 19, 2010, had its world premiere on the opening night of the 16th London Turkish Film Festival (November 4–18, 2010).

== Festival screenings ==
- 16th London Turkish Film Festival (November 4–18, 2010)

== See also ==
- 2010 in film
- Turkish films of 2010
