= Zivar =

Female given name

- Gender: Female

Origin
- Meaning: Jewelry, ornament
- Region of origin: Iran, East Europe

Other names
- Related names: Ziva (Hebrew), Zevar (Uzbek), Zari (Persian)

Zivar (Persian: زيور, also romanized as Zīvar) is a given name common in Iran and Eastern Europe. The meaning of the name "Zivar" is an ornament of gems, gold, or silver or in general jewelry.

== Given name ==
- Zivar Mammadova (1902–1980), Azeri sculptor
- Zivar bay Ahmadbayov (1873–1925), Azerbaijani architect

== See also ==
- Zivar, Zanjan, village in Iran
- Sar Qaleh Zivar, village in Susan-e Gharbi Rural District, Susan District, Izeh County, Khuzestan Province, Iran
