= 47th International Antalya Golden Orange Film Festival =

2010 Turkish film festival

- Festival Poster by Emrah Yucel
- Location: Antalya, Turkey
- Awards: Golden Orange
- Festival date: October 9–14, 2010
- Website: https://www.aksav.org.tr/en/

Antalya Film Festival
- 48th 46th

The 47th International Antalya Golden Orange Film Festival (Turkish: 47. Uluslararası Antalya Altın Portakal Film Festivali) was a film festival held in Antalya, Turkey which ran from October 9 to 14, 2010. Prizes were awarded in four competitions in the course of the festival, at which 191 films were shown at 12 venues across the city with the theme Cinema and Social Interaction and Italian actress Claudia Cardinale was the guest of honor.

This edition of the International Antalya Golden Orange Film Festival was the second to be organised solely by the Antalya Foundation for Culture and Arts (AKSAV), a cultural body affiliated with the Antalya Greater Municipality. It opened with at the Glass Pyramid Exhibition Center in Antalya with an awards ceremony and performances from Melike Demirağ and director Emir Kusturica with The No Smoking Orchestra. Kusturica, who was to have headed the International Feature Film Competition Jury, withdrew from the festival following claims that he had supported the Serbian genocide of Muslims in Bosnia from protestors, including Turkish Minister of Culture and Tourism Ertuğrul Günay, who boycotted the opening gala, and director Semih Kaplanoğlu, who cancelled an out-of-competition screening of his film Honey (Turkish: Bal).

Other events included the four kilometer annual Parade of Stars led by Antalya Mayor Mustafa Akaydın, who heads AKSAV, which featured Eşref Kolçak, Mujdat Gezen, Erkan Can, Ilker Inanoglu and Sumer Tilmac in cars decorated with carnations, and a gala diner at which honorary awards were presented to Megan Mylan, Fyodor Bondarchuk and Serge Avedikian, and fashion designer Erol Albayrak presented his Cinema collection choreographed by Uğurkan Erez. Akaydın announced that this year the festival has been freed from the clutches of a certain group of people and has taken important steps to become a festival of the people.

Gardens of prisons in Antalya were used as a festival areas as part of social responsibility projects, with screenplay workshops organized for prisoners and screens set up for prisoners and artists to view the films together every night during the festival. The director Alan Parker and screenwriter Oliver Stone of the Oscar-winning film Midnight Express, which was set in a Turkish prison, as well as Billy Hayes, who wrote the source book, were invited to attend one such screening.

According to new regulations, the winning filmmaker will be granted half of the TL 330,000 cash prize (TL 165,000) on March 31, 2011. The remaining amount will be granted only if the filmmaker starts working on a new project within two years after the prize win. An additional TL 70,000, billed by the organizers as the Antalya Incentive Prize, will be granted only if part of the movie is filmed in Antalya, thus bringing the sum to TL 400,000. The winner of the best director award will get TL 50,000, while best screenplay gets TL 30,000.

A total of eight books, including biographies or tributes, were published for the festival under the name of Golden Orange Publications.

== Awards ==
=== National Feature Competition ===
- Best Film: Majority (Turkish: Çoğunluk) directed by Seren Yüce
- Best First Film: Toll Booth (Turkish: Gişe Memuru) directed by Tolga Karaçelik
- Best Director: Seren Yüce for Majority (Turkish: Çoğunluk)
- Best Actor: Serkan Ercan for Toll Booth (Turkish: Gişe Memuru) & Bartu Küçükçağlayan for Majority (Turkish: Çoğunluk)
- Best Actress: Claudia Cardinale for Signora Enrica
- Special Jury Award: Press directed by Sedat Yılmaz

=== International Feature Competition ===
- Best Film: Cirkus Columbia directed by Danis Tanović & Dooman River directed by Zhang Lu
- Best Director: Lancelot von Naso for Ceasefire (German: Waffenstillstand)
- Best Actor: Nik Xhelilaj for The Albanian (German: Der Albaner)
- Best Actress: Emma Suárez for The Mosquito Net (Spanish: La Mosquitera)
- Special Jury Award: Meryem Uzerli (actress) for Journey of No Return (German: Eine Reise ohne Rückkehr)

=== Honorary Awards ===
- Cinema Labor Award: Necmettin Çobanoğlu
- Yıldırım Önal Memorial Award: Yıldız Kenter (actress)
- Social Responsibility in Arts Award: Müjdat Gezen (actor, entrepreneur, writer and poet)
- Lifetime Achievement Award: Zeki Alasya and Metin Akpınar (theatre and film comedy duo )
- Lifetime Achievement Award: Gülşen Bubikoğlu (actress)
- Lifetime Achievement Award: Nur Sürer (actress)
- Lifetime Achievement Award: Safa Önal (screenwriter)
- Lifetime Achievement Award: Ertem Göreç (director and screenwriter)
- Honorary Award: Megan Mylan (documentarian)
- Honorary Award: Fyodor Bondarchuk (filmmaker)
- Honorary Award: Serge Avedikian (filmmaker)

== Programmes ==
=== National Feature Competition ===
Fifteen nominees, including nine by first time directors, were initially selected from the record forty-seven films which were submitted for the National Feature Competition of this edition of the festival, but Honey (Turkish: Bal) directed by Semih Kaplanoğlu had to be withdrawn under competition rules after winning the Grand Jury Best Picture award at the 17th International Adana Golden Boll Film Festival.

==== National Feature Competition Jury ====
- Kadir İnanır
- Tomris Giritlioğlu
- Meltem Cumbul
- Meral Okay
- Murathan Mungan
- Gökhan Kırdar
- Atilla Dorsay
- Zinos Panagiotidis
- Mehmet Aktekin

==== Films in competition ====
- Zephyr (Turkish: Zefir) directed by Belma Baş
- Merry-Go-Round (Turkish: Atlıkarınca) directed by İlksen Başarır
- Black and White (Turkish: Siyah Beyaz) directed by Ahmet Boyacıoğlu
- Paper (Turkish: Kağıt) directed by Sinan Çetin
- The Crossing (Turkish: Kavşak) directed by Selim Demirdelen
- White as Snow (Turkish: Kar Beyaz) directed by Selim Güneş
- Signora Enrica directed by Ali İlhan
- Toll Booth (Turkish: Gişe Memuru) directed by Tolga Karaçelik
- Jackal (Turkish: Çakal) directed by Erhan Kozan
- Hayde Bre directed by Orhan Oğuz
- Hair (Turkish: Saç) directed by Tayfun Pirselimoğlu
- Press directed by Sedat Yılmaz
- Majority (Turkish: Çoğunluk) directed by Seren Yüce
- Shadows and Faces (Turkish: Gölgeler ve Suretler) directed by Derviş Zaim

=== International Feature Competition ===
Eleven nominees, including one Turkish film, were selected for the International Feature Competition of this edition of the festival. Serbian filmmaker Emir Kusturica, who was to head the competition jury, was forced to withdraw from the festival after protests from various Turkish groups that claimed he supported the Serbian genocide of Muslims in Bosnia.

==== International Feature Film Competition Jury ====
- Emir Kusturica (withdrawn)

==== Films in competition ====
- Brought by the Sea (Turkish: Denizden Gelen) directed by Nesli Çölgeçen
- Silent Souls (Russian: Ovsyanki) directed by Aleksei Fedorchenko
- 180° directed by Cihan Inan
- Echoes of the Rainbow (Chinese: 歲月神偷; Jyutping: Seoi Jyut San Tau; romanisation: Shui Yuet Sun Tau; literally "Time, the Thief") directed by Alex Law
- Dooman River directed by Zhang Lu
- The Albanian (German: Der Albaner) directed by Johannes Naber
- Hitler in Hollywood (French: Hitler à Hollywood) directed by Frédéric Sojcher
- Cirkus Columbia directed by Danis Tanović
- Clash of Civilizations Over an Elevator in Piazza Vittorio (Italian: Scontro di Civiltà per un Ascensore a Piazza Vittorio) directed by Isotta Toso
- The Mosquito Net (Spanish: La Mosquitera) directed by Agustí Vila
- Ceasefire (German: Waffenstillstand) directed by Lancelot von Naso

=== National Documentary Competition ===
Twenty nominees were selected for the National Documentary Competition of this edition of the festival.

==== National Documentary Competition Jury ====
- Megan Mylan
- Coşkun Aral

=== National Short Film Competition ===
==== National Short Film Competition Jury ====
- Serge Avedikian
- Mehmet Bahadır Er

== See also ==
- 2010 in film
- Turkish films of 2010
