= Özgür Uyanık =

Turkish film director

Özgür Uyanık is a writer and film director born in Turkey and raised in the United Kingdom..

== Early life and education ==
Uyanık's family emigrated from Turkey to the United Kingdom in 1980. He attended the University of Kent at Canterbury, graduating with a degree in Communications and Image Studies.

== Career ==
He began his career in the film industry after graduation. He has written and directed award-winning short films and ad campaigns, including Oblivious (2001), starring Sienna Guillory, which won Best European Short Film at the Brussels European Film Festival as well as being short-listed for a BAFTA and sold to Universal Sci-Fi Channel and Canal+ International for several territories.

The 2010 Kaleidoscope release Resurrecting: The Street Walker is Uyanık's feature film debut as writer-director. It was nominated for Best UK Feature at the Raindance Film Festival and was official selection at the International Istanbul Film Festival, FAB Edinburgh Horror Film Festival, the Festival of Fantastic Film Manchester, Dublin Horrorthon, Abertoir Horror Film Festival in Wales, Belgium's Razor Reel and the Haapsalu Horror & Fantasy Film Festival.

Holy Men, his second feature-length film project, was selected for the 2014–2015 Binger Filmlab Writer's Lab in Amsterdam, Netherlands, and Creative Europe MEDIA workshop The Film Garage created by Scuola Holden with the collaboration of Courmayeur Noir In Festival and Frontières.

His debut novel CONCEPTION was published in 2020 by Fairlight Books in the UK. In an interview with Fairlight Books, he stated about the source of his inspiration, "I always regretted not going to art school and perhaps because of this I am fascinated by how artists and the art world functions."

He was a contributing co-editor for an anthology of creative essays by under-represented voices called JUST SO YOU KNOW—ESSAYS OF EXPERIENCE, published by Parthian Books in 2020. In the same year he was commissioned to run a webinar by Literature Wales for a cohort of writers from under-represented backgrounds and has taught creative writing at Cardiff University and Cardiff Metropolitan University.
