= The Jackal (2010 film) =

- Theatrical poster
- Directed by: Erhan Kozan
- Written by: Sertan Telli
- Produced by: Kaan Korkmaz
- Starring: İsmail Hacıoğlu; Erkan Can; Uğur Polat; Haldun Boysan; Turgay Tanülkü; Damla Sönmez
- Cinematography: Doğan Sarıgüzel
- Distributed by: Cinefilm
- Release dates: October 9, 2010 (Antalya); December 17, 2010 (Turkey)
- Running time: 90 minutes
- Country: Turkey
- Language: Turkish

The Jackal (Turkish: Çakal) is a 2010 Turkish action film, directed by Erhan Kozan, about a quiet young boy who gradually becomes a criminal nicknamed the Jackal. The film, which went on nationwide general release across Turkey on December 17, 2010, premiered in competition at the 47th Antalya "Golden Orange" International Film Festival (October 9 to 14, 2010).

== Production ==
The film was shot on location in Istanbul, Turkey.

Illustrator Korkut Akaçık, who made the film's storyboard sketches, is to adapt the film into a graphic novel.

== Plot ==
The life of Akın, who lives in one of the poorest neighborhoods in Istanbul, begins to change after his mother’s death. He hopes to start a new life with the money he plans to steal from the carpenter's workshop he works at. His girlfriend, Deniz, finds his plan ridiculous and leaves him. Akın then accepts an offer by his friend İdris, which leads to a new start in his life. Having nothing to lose, Akın impresses his boss with his fearless and indifferent attitude, but a new life also brings with it a new host of enemies.

== Release ==
=== Premiere ===
The film premiered in competition at the 47th Antalya "Golden Orange" International Film Festival (October 9 to 14, 2010).

=== General release ===
The film opened in 81 screens across Turkey on December 17, 2010 at number 8 in the Turkish box office with a first weekend gross of US$1,129.

== See also ==
- 2010 in film
- Turkish films of 2010
