= Hunting Season (2010 film) =

- Hunting Season Theatrical Poster
- Directed by: Yavuz Turgul
- Written by: Yavuz Turgul
- Produced by: Yavuz Turgul; Murat Akdilek
- Starring: Şener Şen; Cem Yılmaz; Çetin Tekindor; Melisa Sözen; Okan Yalabık
- Cinematography: Uğur İçbak
- Edited by: İsmail Canlısoy
- Music by: Tamer Çıray
- Production companies: Warner Bros. Fida Film; ProFilm
- Distributed by: Warner Bros.; Fida Film; ProFilm
- Release date: 3 December 2010
- Country: Turkey
- Language: Turkish
- Budget: US$4 million
- Box office: US$12,160,978

Hunting Season (Turkish: Av Mevsimi) is a 2010 Turkish drama film, written and directed by Yavuz Turgul, which stars Şener Şen and Cem Yılmaz as two policemen who team up with a rookie to investigate a murder case. The film, which went on nationwide general release across Turkey on 3 December 2010, was one of the highest grossing Turkish films of 2010 and was released in six European countries in addition to Turkey.

== Plot ==
Veteran Istanbul homicide detective Ferman (Şener Şen), nicknamed "the Hunter", works with his hot-headed partner İdris (Cem Yılmaz), known as "Mad İdris", and Hasan (Okan Yalabık), a young rookie detective with an academic background in anthropology. The three are assigned to investigate the murder of Pamuk, a young woman whose dismembered body has been discovered.

The investigation first leads the detectives to people from Pamuk's troubled personal life. Among the suspects are her conservative family, who may have killed her for reasons of honor, her brothers Abbas and Vakkas, and Asit Ömer (Rıza Kocaoğlu), a drug dealer with whom she had been involved. Because Pamuk had left her family and entered a dangerous social environment, the case initially appears to be either an honor killing or a murder connected to the criminal underworld.

As Ferman and his team continue the investigation, they discover that Pamuk was also connected to Battal Çolakzade (Çetin Tekindor), one of the richest businessmen in Turkey. Battal had taken Pamuk as his second wife despite the great difference in their age and social status. His daughter Ceylan is seriously ill and in need of a kidney transplant, while Pamuk's family is financially dependent on him. Ferman gradually begins to suspect that Battal's relationship with Pamuk was not what it appeared to be.

The case also affects the private lives of the detectives. Ferman is devoted to his own ill wife, whose condition makes the subject of organ transplantation especially personal to him. İdris remains obsessed with his former wife Asiye (Melisa Sözen) and becomes increasingly unstable as the investigation progresses. Hasan, meanwhile, struggles to adapt to the violence and moral ambiguity of homicide work.

İdris eventually obtains information suggesting Battal's involvement, but before he can fully reveal what he has learned, he is shot by Battal's men. Before dying, he leaves Ferman a clue that helps him reconsider the case. Ferman then realizes that Pamuk's death was not primarily a crime of passion, a drug-related killing, or an honor killing.

Ferman discovers that Battal had arranged for blood and tissue samples to be taken from people around him in order to find a compatible donor for Ceylan. Pamuk was found to be suitable. Taking advantage of her family's poverty and dependence on him, Battal married her so that her kidney could be removed for his daughter. Pamuk was sacrificed as an organ donor, and her body was later dismembered and disposed of in order to conceal the crime and mislead the police investigation.

In the final confrontation, Ferman meets Battal at his hunting lodge. Battal admits that he acted to save Ceylan, although the transplant has failed and his daughter remains terminally ill. Ferman makes it clear that he has solved the case and that Battal's crimes may be exposed. Left alone with the consequences of his actions, Battal commits suicide with his hunting rifle. The case ends with Ferman leaving the scene after uncovering the truth behind Pamuk's death.

== Cast ==
- Şener Şen - Ferman, «the Hunter»
- Cem Yılmaz - İdris, «the Mad»
- Çetin Tekindor - Battal Çolakzade
- Melisa Sözen - Asiye
- Okan Yalabık - Çömez Hasan
- Mahir İpek - Murat Öneş
- Rıza Kocaoğlu - Asit Ömer
- Nergis Çorakçı - Hatun
- Mustafa Avkıran - Müslüm

== Release ==
The film opened in 652 screens across Turkey on December 3, 2010 at number one in the Turkish box office chart with an opening weekend gross of US$2,697,707.

== Reception ==
=== Box office ===
The film was number one at the Turkish box office for five-weeks running and has made a total gross of US$12,160,978.

== See also ==
- 2010 in film
- Turkish films of 2010
