= Redd (band) =

Turkish rock band

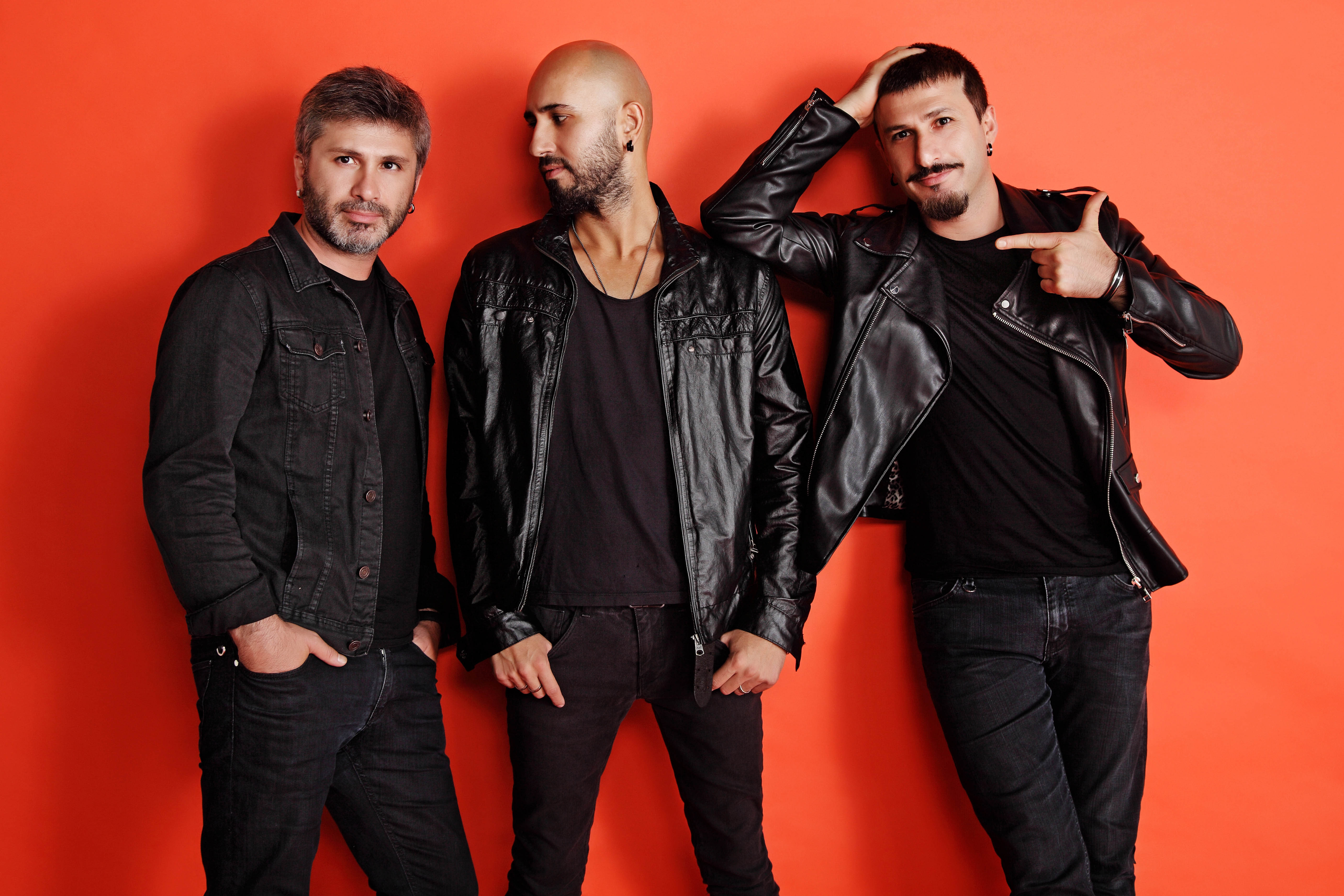

Background information
- Origin: Turkey
- Genres: Rock
- Years active: 1996–present
- Labels: Stardium; Pasaj Müzik; Sony Music - Arista; Most Production - İmaj
- Members: Doğan Duru (vocals, Bass guitar); Güneş Duru (backing vocals, guitar); Berke Özgümüş Drums
- Past members: Zafer Şanlı (bass guitar); Suat Ayyıldız (drum); Ege Göktuna (bass); Sefa Deniz Alemdar (drum); Berke Hatipoğlu (backing vocals, guitar); İlke Hatipoğlu (piano, synth, Hammond)
- Website: http://www.redd.com.tr

Redd is a Turkish rock band established in 1996 by tenor opera singer Doğan Duru and guitarist Berke Hatipoğlu under the name Ten. They used to play at bars until they set up their own studio in 2004. Their first album, titled "50/50", produced by Levent Büyük, was published a year later by Stardium Müzik, already under the name Redd. The first music video was shot for "Mutlu Olmak İçin" (To Be Happy). Their second studio album, "Kirli Suyunda Parıltılar" (Glitters on Dirty Water), came out in 2006 under the label Pasaj Müzik. Their song "Falan Filan" entered the MTV World Music Charts at the 10th position. In 2007 the band produced their third album, "Plastik Çiçekler ve Böcek" (Plastic Flowers and Beetle). Redd started the studio recordings of their fourth album in 2009, published by Sony Music. Their first original soundtrack album for director Çağan Irmak's feature film Prensesin Uykusu was released in 2010. Songs from this album managed to enter the European music charts. Their last album, "Mükemmel Boşluk" was published in 2016 under the Pasaj label.

== History ==
Redd started working as a band in September 1996. Doğan Duru and Güneş Duru decided to make some changes in their group Invictus Band. Doğan invited Berke Hatipoğlu to their group, and then İlke Hatipoğlu also joined. After playing as Invictus Band for more than a year, the group decided to carry on performing under the name of "Ten".

Ten changed itself to Redd a bit later, and the band started to perform rock music in English especially in Istanbul. They started to write some of their own songs while they were performing, and in 2003 they moved their recording activities to record studios.

The band decided to find their own studio because of the rental studios difficulties and wrote many songs in one year

Over the course of its 20-year history, the group has released 8 studio albums, 1 film soundtrack, and 1 concert DVD. In addition, they have appeared on various compilation albums. In 2014, the group entered a new era following the departure of Berke and İlke Hatipoğlu.

Dogan Duru, the group's leading figure, express themselves as "none of our albums sound alike; we achieve that variety through constant change, transformation, and revolution within ourselves—in other words, there’s always a revolution happening in Redd, which is why our music is always evolving."

Moving toward a more electronic and indie-rock sound compared to previous eras, the group also stands out for its oppositional stance and political attitude.

== Social Works ==
=== Rock for Van ===
A major earthquake occurred in Van on 24 October 2011. To support the people who lost their homes, Güneş Duru called various artists on Twitter to organize a charity concert. More than 15,000 tickets were sold and a school was built with the money raised by the concert.

=== Memorial Concert for Hrant Dink ===
To remember Hrant Dink, who was the main editor of Agos Newspaper and had been brutally assassinated on 19 January 2007, Redd organized a special concert in Ghetto, exactly five years after his death. Gripin, Kardeş Türküler, Jehan Barbur, Moğollar, Mor ve Ötesi, Aylin Aslım, Şevval Sam and Rojin performed in this concert. The money from this concert was donated to Hrant Dink Foundation. Redd also wrote "Özgürlük Sırtından Vurulmuş" ( Freedom was backstabbed) in their album "21" for Hrant Dink.

=== Ahmet Şık and Nedim Şener ===
Bon Jovi came to Istanbul during their 2011 Europe tour and Redd performed as the opening group for them. In the concert, Redd sang "Masal" (fairytale) for Ahmet Şık and Nedim Şener, who were unjustly in prison for 127 days .

== Discography ==
- 2005: 50/50 (Stardium)
- 2006: Kirli Suyunda Parıltılar (Pasaj)
- 2008: Gecenin Fişi Yok DVD (Pasaj)
- 2008: Plastik Çiçekler ve Böcek (Pasaj)
- 2009: 21 (Sony Music)
- 2010: Prensesin Uykusu (Most Production - İmaj)
- 2012: Hayat Kaçık Bir Uykudur (Pasaj)
- 2016: Mükemmel Boşluk (Pasaj)
- 2019: Yersiz Göksüz Zamanlar (Pasaj)

== Music videos ==
Year	Title	Director	Albüm
2005	Mutlu Olmak İçin	Mete Özgencil	50/50
2005	Öperler	Mete Özgencil	50/50
2005	Bahçelere Daldık	Mete Özgencil	50/50
2006	Falan Filan	Cemil Ağacıklıoğlu	Kirli Suyunda Parıltılar
2006	Hala Aşk Var Mı?	Murat Küçük	Kirli Suyunda Parıltılar
2007	Dünya	Cemil Ağacıklıoğlu	Kirli Suyunda Parıltılar
2008	Boşver (Live)	Gökhan Gürek	Gecenin Fişi Yok
2008	Nefes Bile Almadan	Emir Khalilzadeh	Plastik Çiçekler ve Böcek
2009	Don Kişot	Cemil Ağacıkoğlu	21
2009	Seni Buldum	Emir Khalilzadeh	21
2009	Her Neyse	Emir Khalilzadeh	21
2010	Tamam Böyle Kalsın (Live)	Gökhan Palas	21
2010	Prensesin Uykusuyum	Çağan Irmak	Prensesin Uykusu
2011	Masal	Alper Çağlar	21
2011	Aşktı Bu	Sinan Uçkan	21
2012	Yavaş Yavaş Yavaş	Ömer Faruk Sorak	Hayat Kaçık Bir Uykudur
2013	Beni Sevdi Benden Çok	Cemil Ağacıklıoğlu	Hayat Kaçık Bir Uykudur
2013	Aşık Oldum Celladıma	Güneş Duru	Hayat Kaçık Bir Uykudur
2014	Bir Yol Bulursun		Hayat Kaçık Bir Uykudur
2016	Aşk Virüs		Mükemmel Boşluk
2016	İtiraf		Mükemmel Boşluk
2017	Tam Bi Delilik	Baturhan Bilgin	Mükemmel Boşluk
2017	Kalpsiz Romantik	Güneş Duru	Mükemmel Boşluk
2017	Sextronot	Baturhan Bilgin	Mükemmel Boşluk
2017	Boşlukta Dans	Güneş Duru	Mükemmel Boşluk
2018	Hala Seni Çok Özlüyorum	Güneş Duru	Mükemmel Boşluk
2018	Kanıyorduk	Güneş Duru	Mükemmel Boşluk
2019	Sen de Saçmala	Kerem Akyıl	Yersiz Göksüz Zamanlar
2020	Tutmuyor Frenler	Güneş Duru	Yersiz Göksüz Zamanlar

== Sources ==
- Redd Biography (in Turkish)
