= Işıl Yücesoy =

Turkish actress and singer (born 1945)

- Born: 2 October 1945 (age 80); Kırklareli, Turkey
- Occupations: Singer, actress
- Years active: 1975–present
- Spouse: Tanju Cılızoğlu (m. 1989; died 2021)
- Children: 1

Işıl Yücesoy (born 2 October 1945) is a Turkish movie and theatre actress and singer.

== Life ==
Işıl Yücesoy was born in Kırklareli, Turkey on 2 October 1945. Her father Selahattin was a music teacher, and she learned piano playing from her father. After she finished the high school, she studied drama at Ankara State Conservatory, and graduated in 1969. On 1 July 1989, she married Tayfun Cılızoğlu. She has a daughter named Meneviş. In 2016, she moved to the United States to join her daughter, who lives in New York City.

== Music career ==
Between 1969 and 1975, she was performing for the Turkish State Theatres. She then focused on music and resigned from the theatre to go on the stage as a singer. She performed in many nightclubs. Her repertoire consisted mostly of Turkish covers of western pop music. She also sang in English, Italian and Russian music. In one of her 45-rmp records, there is a composition of Selami Şahin, a Turkish composer. In 1978, she established her own record label Orient.

She then developed an interest in television and cinema. She appeared in many television series and films.

== Discography ==
=== 45 rpms and singles ===
Year	Single	Album
1975	Çalamazsın Mutluluğu – Köye Geldi Bir Gelin	En İyileriyle Işıl Yücesoy
1977	Açılmamış Mektup – İçmeden Sarhoş	En İyileriyle Işıl Yücesoy
1977	Bir Var Bir Yok – Sen Seni	En İyileriyle Işıl Yücesoy
1978	Sen İnanma – Ya Seninle Ya Sensiz	En İyileriyle Işıl Yücesoy
1982	Ağlarım	non-album single
2017	Hayat Herkese Aynı	non-album single
2018	Hani Ben	non-album single
2020	Yetmez Mi?	non-album single
2020	Kaybolan Yıllar	Sezen Aksu Sokağı
2020	Şarkı Söylemek Lazım	Sezen Aksu Sokağı
2020	Büklüm Büklüm	Sezen Aksu Sokağı
2020	Perişanım Şimdi / Biliyorsun	Sezen Aksu Sokağı
2020	Sarı Odalar / Ateş Böceği	Sezen Aksu Sokağı
2020	Kaç Yıl Geçti Aradan / Dört Günlük Bir Şey	Sezen Aksu Sokağı
2020	İzninle	non-album single

=== Albums (LP and CD) ===
Her albums are the following:

- 1979: Bir Evet Yeter
- 2005: En İyileriyle Işıl Yücesoy
- 2016: Zamansız
- 2021: Sezen Aksu Sokağı
- 2021: Vefa (remake) (EP)

== Filmography ==
Year	Title	Role	Notes
1981	Milcan		
1984	Geçim Otobüsü	Nazlı	
2000	Üvey Baba	Hanımağa	
2004	Çemberimde Gül Oya	Sema	
2004	Korkuyorum Anne	Neriman	
2005	Güz Yangını	Dila Hanım	
2006	Rüya Gibi	İhya	
2007	Zoraki Koca	Saadet	
2008	Goncakaranfil	Babaanne	
2008	Yol Arkadaşım	Nalan	
2011–2013	Yer Gök Aşk	Hamiyet	
2014	Unutursam Fısılda	Hanife	
2014	Kara Para Aşk	Nedret	
2015	Hayat Mucizelere Gebe	Anneanne	
2016	Aşk ve Mavi	Refika	
2019	Ferhat ile Şirin	Hayriye	
2022–2023	Ben Bu Cihana Sığmazam	Gülendam	
2024–	Siyah Kalp	Nihayet	
