= Sevinç Erbulak =

Turkish actress

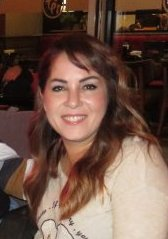
- Born: Fatoş Sevinç Erbulak; October 20, 1975 (age 50); Istanbul, Turkey
- Occupation: Actress
- Years active: 1993–present
- Spouses: Dalin Midyat (m. 2005; div. 2009) Volkan Cengen (m. 2021)
- Children: 1

Fatoş Sevinç Erbulak (born October 20, 1975, in Istanbul) is a Turkish actress, who acted in Kiralık Konak, Aşk-ı Memnû and Derya Gülü. She is the daughter of two famous actors Altan Erbulak and Füsun Erbulak. Sevinç is currently married to Dalin Midyat, with whom she has a daughter.

== Filmography ==
TV series/Movies
Year	Title	Role	Note
1994–1997	Süperbaba	Zeynep	TV series
1997–2000	Baba Evi	Bilge	TV series
2000	Yarali Kurt	Gül	Movie
2001	Babam ve Biz		TV series
2022	Küzenlerim	Ece	TV series
2005	Çat Kapı		TV series
2006	Beş Vakit	Yakup's Mother	Movie
2008	Son Bahar	Rühsar	TV series
2010	Prensesin Uykusu	Seçil	Movie
2014	Karışık Kaset	Feride	Movie
2015	Ulan İstanbul	Aysel	TV series
2015	Masumiyet	Meryem	Movie
2016	Lütfı	Meral	Short Movie
2016–2017	No 309	Betül Sarıhan	TV series
2018	Darısı Başımıza	Ferrin	TV series
2019	Erkenci Kuş	Mihriban Tayfuni	TV series
2019	Uzun Zaman Önce	Saadet	Movie
2020	Kırmızı Oda	Berna	TV series
2022	Senden Daha Güzel	Serpil Demirhan	TV series
2023–	Sakla Beni	Füsun	TV series
