= Nihal Koldaş =

Turkish actress and theater director

Nihal Geyran Koldaş is a Turkish actress and theater director. She is known for her roles in Masumiyet as Yusuf's (Güven Kıraç) elder sister and in Bıçak Sırtı as Gönül. Together with Zeki Demirkubuz, she was one of the two producers of Masumiyet.

Early in her career, she worked mostly in theater. In 1997, she started working at Bilsak Theater Studios and got role in plays such as Heiner Müller's Hamlet/Machine and Shakespeare's Hamlet. She later wrote and developed the play Park Yapılmaz together with Ceysu Koçak. In 1999, at the 11th International Istanbul Theater Festival in Bilsak Theater Studios, she got a role in the play Kurbağa Öyküleri.

In 2003, she directed the play Özel Bir Gün at Tiyatro Diyez, in which Hale Soygazi has the main role. In 2004, together with Aylin Deveci and Gözde Saner, she brought the story Mut by Sevim Burak on stage and directed it as well. In 2005, she appeared in the play Homebody/Kabul by Tony Kushner, which tells the story of a western woman believed that the history needs to ask for forgiveness from the exploited east.

In November 2007, she appeared in front of the audience again with the play Beckett Grimavi at Bilsak Theater Studios & Maya Stage, which she had translated, designed and edited herself. She was later cast in Kanal D's TV series Bıçak Sırtı and continued to work at Bilsak Theater Studios & Maya Stage. In 2012, she had a leading role in the movie Kuma, directed by Umut Dağ.
