= Cosmos (2010 film) =

- Theatrical Poster
- Directed by: Reha Erdem
- Written by: Reha Erdem
- Produced by: Ömer Atay
- Starring: Sermet Yeşil; Türkü Turan; Hakan Altuntaş; Murat Deniz; Asil Büyüközçelik; Sencar Sağdıç
- Cinematography: Şenol Toz; Florent Herry
- Edited by: Reha Erdem
- Production company: Atlantik Film
- Distributed by: Tiglon
- Release dates: February 17, 2009 (Berlinale); April 16, 2010 (Turkey)
- Running time: 122 minutes
- Countries: Turkey; Bulgaria
- Language: Turkish

Cosmos (Turkish: Kosmos) is a 2009 Turkish-Bulgarian drama film, written and directed by Reha Erdem, starring Sermet Yeşil as a thief and a miracle worker who is welcomed into a tiny, snowbound border village after resuscitating a half-drowned boy. The film, which went on nationwide general release across Turkey on April 16, 2010, won four awards at the 46th Antalya "Golden Orange" International Film Festival, including the Golden Orange for Best Film, which it shared with Bornova Bornova (2009) directed by İnan Temelkuran. The film also won the Golden Apricot at the 2010 Yerevan International Film Festival, Armenia, for Best Feature Film.

== Production ==
The film was shot on location in Kars, Turkey.
