= Reha Erdem =

Turkish film director and screenwriter

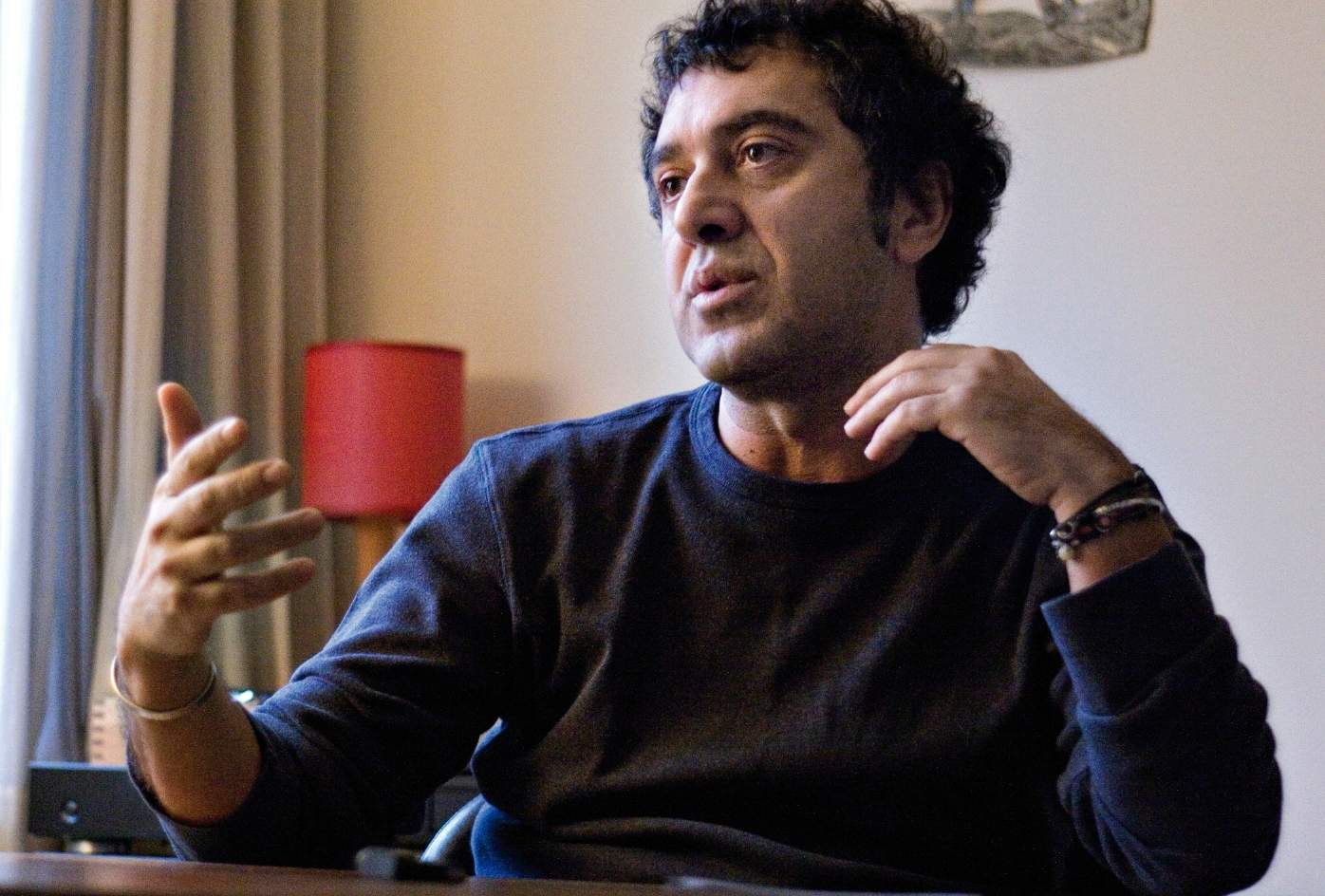
- Born: 1960 (age 65–66); Istanbul, Turkey
- Education: Ateliers Varan
- Occupation: Filmmaker
- Years active: 1988–present

Reha Erdem (born 1960 in Istanbul) is a Turkish film director and screenwriter.

== Biography ==
He attended Galatasaray High School and studied history at Boğaziçi University before leaving to study film in 1983. He participated in two Ateliers Varan workshops in Paris in 1984 where he learn about direct cinema and directed two short documentaries. He obtained a B.A. in Cinema Studies and an M.A. in Plastic Arts from the University of Paris VIII.

Erdem's critical approach to masculinity gives him a unique place among the directors of new Turkish cinema.

== Filmography ==
Films, Television & Video
Year	Title	Credited as			Notes
Year	Title	Director	Writer	Editor	Notes
1984	Eric : indirect	Yes	Yes		First Documentary short in direct cinema.
1984	Attendez piétons	Yes	Yes		Second Documentary short in direct cinema.
1988	Oh, Moon! (Turkish: A Ay)	Yes	Yes		Debut film.
1999	Run for Money (Turkish: Kaç Para Kaç)	Yes	Yes		
2004	Mommy, I'm Scared (Turkish: Korkuyorum Anne)	Yes	Yes		
2006	Ekim'de Hiçbir Kere	Yes	Yes		Short film.
2006	Times and Winds (Turkish: Beş Vakit)	Yes	Yes	Yes	
2008	My Only Sunshine (Turkish: Hayat Var)	Yes	Yes	Yes	
2010	Cosmos (Turkish: Kosmos)	Yes	Yes	Yes	
2013	Jîn	Yes	Yes	Yes	
2013	Singing Women (Turkish: Şarkı Söyleyen Kadınlar)	Yes	Yes	Yes	
2016	Big Big World	Yes	Yes	Yes	

== Awards ==
- 3rd Yeşilçam Awards (March 23, 2010) - Best Director Award for Hayat Var (Won)

Awards
Preceded by Uğur Yücel	Golden Orange Award for Best Screenplay; 2005 for Korkuyorum Anne shared with Nilüfer Güngörmüş	Succeeded by Önder Çakar
Preceded by not held	Golden Boll Award for Best Screenplay; 2005 for Korkuyorum Anne shared with Nilüfer Güngörmüş	Succeeded by Levent Kazak; Ezel Akay
Preceded by Derviş Zaim	Golden Orange Award for Best Director; 2009 for Kosmos	Succeeded by incumbent
