= Murat Ertel =

Background information
- Born: Osman Murat Ertel; 30 March 1964 (age 62); Istanbul, Turkey
- Genres: Psychedelic, Anatolian Rock
- Occupations: Musician, producer
- Instruments: Vocal; electric saz; guitar; theremin; percussion; vox
- Years active: 1996–present
- Member of: Baba Zula
- Spouse: Esma Ertel (2012–)

Osman Murat Ertel (born 30 March 1964) is a Turkish musician. He is the son of Mengü Ertel and Ülfet Ertel.

He is one of the founders of the ZeN and Baba Zula groups. While he was making improvised music with ZeN, he also focused on his Turkish roots in Baba Zula and composed film and theater music with this group. He also produces music.

== Biography ==
=== Early life ===
Murat Ertel was born in Istanbul on 30 March 1964 as the only child of Ülfet and Mengü Ertel. His father was an internationally known graphic designer and his uncles, Turhan Selçuk and İlhan Selçuk, were internationally known cartoonist and writer, respectively. Ertel first started playing the xylophone while still crawling as a toddler and continued with his grandmother's harmonica. He also started making music by turning his grandmother Hikmet Selçuk's record player and radio on and off while they was playing and changing the speed of the record player.

To accompany his music with dance, Ertel founded his first group in 1969 called "Mavi Güneş" (Blue Sun). The name of the group emerged when Ertel, who was going to kindergarten, drew a blue sun and was told by his teacher that the sun could not be blue. When his father learned about the situation, he went to Ertel's school the next day and said, "I am an artist; the sun can be drawn as blue or any other color my son wants; do not instill such harmful ideas in my son's mind." Impressed, Ertel named his first band "Blue Sun." It consisted of himself and two of his neighbours, girls named Esra Yazıcı and Aslı Kayabal. They performed their shows to Ertel's household, but the group disbanded in less than a year.

Away from his family, Ertel continued to make sculptures, ceramics and paintings under the supervision of leading artists Tamer Başol, Zühtü Müridoğlu, Kuzgun Acar, and Ali Teoman Germaner. He read poems in primary school and performed theater plays with sketches he wrote. He drew pictures and cartoons of animals and alien creatures, and made posters that were not printed, just like his father. Ertel often read some magazines as soon as they were published because of his mother's cousin Mehmet Benli, who published Vampirella, Jungla and Korku, and his uncle Turhan Selçuk, who drew Abdülcanbaz.

Ertel grew up with intellectuals and revolutionary people of the art world, including Aziz Nesin, Yaşar Kemal, Edip Cansever, and Turgut Uyar, who were his family's closest friends. Ertel also met younger generation artists by watching the rehearsals of Ahmet Güvenç and his band Bunalım, with whom they were neighbors, next to the house described in Bülent Ortaçgil's song "Suna Abla" on Sağlam Fikir Street. Bunalım was one of the first underground and psychedelic bands of Turkey. He continued to draw, sculpt and compose in primary school, and wrote poems and stories. His paintings were first published when he was 7 years old, in the program booklet of the Istanbul State Opera and Ballet's operetta called Polaria. The drawings were later published in Doğan Kardeş magazine. (1971) He produced his first magazine, Ormandaki Fısıltılar, in 5 copies, at the age of 8. He would continue drawing for magazines and books throughout his life.

He was greatly influenced by artists such as Can Yücel, Mehmet Güleryüz, Melih Cevdet Anday, Ara Güler, and Cihat Burak, who constantly came to their house. Among the musicians, he was most influenced by his uncle's close friend Aşık İhsani and Ruhi Su, who would come to his house throughout his life and play all of his albums from beginning to end for his father to design the covers for him. He started listening to the records of artists such as Barış Manço, Fikret Kızılok and Cem Karaca, which he heard on the radio, pushing his family to buy them. Because of his family's passion for art and their artist friends, he spent his life at exhibition openings, theater and cinema premieres, festivals and concerts since his childhood. Starting from rehearsals to premieres, they have seen most leading theater companies like Dostlar Theatre, Kenterler, Nejat Uygur, Müjdat Gezen, Gülriz Sururi and Engin Cezzar, Haldun Taner and Devekuşu Kabare, Zeki Alasya and Metin Akpınar, Ferhan Şensoy from his childhood. He followed these artists throughout his life, going backstage with his father at the end of the plays. They also met with older doyens such as Engin Günaydın, Münir Özkul, Bedia Muvahhit, Semiha Berksoy and Muhsin Ertuğrul. Since Mengü Ertel was a member and one-time president of Sinematek, he watched cinema classics such as Battleship Potemkin or Rashomon many times at a very strict pace. The 8 mm films that his father rented and watched together already at home as a child were also shown in the school canteen again once or twice a week.

While he was going to English High School, he started listening to British and American rock bands such as the Doors, Santana and Pink Floyd. His father bought him his first guitar and he started playing guitar intensively. (1976) He started improvising with Uğur Güracar, Samih Rifat and Ünol Büyükgönenç at his neighbor Nihat Fındıklı's house. As a family, they started going to his uncle İlhan Selçuk's house in Akyaka and going on Blue Cruises by boat with authors such as Azra Erhat and Mîna Urgan. In the same years, Maçka Art gallery was an environment where the family went two or three days a week, and until the 90s, he spent his youth together with artists and scientists such as Füreya Koral, Can Değer Furtun, Seyhun Topuz, Ömer Uluç, Semiha Berksoy, Komet and Erdal İnönü. In 1978, he formed a band called İkide Bir (Two of One) with his high school friend Akın Evliyaoğlu and recorded the improvised concept album Nightwalker on a single side of a cassette. Peker Açıkalın also joined the duo for their second album, but these recordings did not become an album. He took part in theater plays in high school and won awards as an actor under the direction of Faik Ertener. From middle school until the end of high school, he drew a graphic novel called Super Dumb with his classmate Bozkurt Bayer. Over the years, this graphic novel have turned into cartoon strips that are secretly passed from hand to hand by students during class.

=== 1980–1990 ===
In the early 1980s, he formed a band called Dead Rats with Akın Evliyaoğlu, Bozkurt Bayer and Sinan Uzel and participated in the Milliyet Inter-High School Music Competition. However, the group was eliminated due to improvisation. The band, which performed in German high school and a few colleges, disbanded the same year. He worked as a guide for the Hungarian rock band Omega, which came to Istanbul in 1982, and continued working as guide for the events of Bilsak Jazz Festival, İKSV and Pozitif, meeting many artists and watching their soundchecks. He graduated from school with opening the second literature branch in the history of High School with his friends. He entered the academy, Cinema and TV Institute with the highest degree. He studied at the school for two years with teachers such as Lütfi Akad, Süha Arın and Duygu Sağıroğlu, and worked in the laboratory, in the film processing and printing section and in the projection room. In 1985, Akın and Murat started playing their own compositions with Ayhan Sayıner on bass, Serdar Karaoğlu on drums, and Erdin Çeliköz on vocals. This band, which they named TIR, disbanded after a few successful university concerts.

He made his first movie soundtrack together with Akın in 1986. This short film named ‘Yokuş’ (‘the Slope’), was selected as the best film at the Oberhausen film festival. The director was Dilek Gökçin. After leaving the university, he concentrated on music and continued composing.

He composed and improvised music in Kadıköy Çatı Studio with musicians such as Murat Çelik from the band Düş Sokağı Sakinleri on vocals and acoustic guitar, İsmail Taşbiçen on drums, and Serdar Karaoğlu on bass. He drew graphic novels, cartoons and pictures. He started playing anonymously with his friends from high school, Kerem Kırkpınar on bass, Burak Aktay on guitar and Burak Orhun on drums. This was the High school band that would form the basis for ZeN.

He entered the Department of English Language and Literature at Boğaziçi University. He took lessons from Jale Parla, Oya Başak, Ercüment Atabay and Tomris Uyar at this school and graduated. Burak Aktay went to Cairo. The group took the name ZeN at university.(1988) Murat Ertel, who gave this band its name, was influenced by an Iranian friend who said that "if I had a daughter, I would name her ZeN". The girl told him that ZeN means woman in Persian. With the addition of Merih Öztaylan on vocals, they became a four piece band again. Shortly after, with Bozkurt Coşkunoğlu (Painted Bird, Exotic Pi Band) taking over the drums, they gave their first concert at Boğaziçi University Taş Oda. The band's Persian logo was used for the first time in this concert. After this concert, Mustafa Bahar (Edip Akbayram DOSTLAR) took over the bass. At one point, Mehtap Özkan also took part in vocals. Meanwhile, Ertel was elected president of Boğaziçi University Music Club and served as president for several years.

He recorded his first solo album, Büyük Günahlar in 1987, but the album was not released. He wrote about music first in Gergedan (1987–1988) and then in Argos magazines (1988–1990), when Ömer Madra and Enis Batur were the publishing consultants of the magazine. ZeN started giving concerts at Boğaziçi University, clubs and various venues in Istanbul. As a result of Mehtap Özkan's suicide and Mustafa Bahar's disruption of rehearsals, the cast expanded and improvisations increased. They recorded their first album, Uzay 1989, during this period. (1989)

=== 1990–2000 ===
Burak Aktay returned from Cairo and his high school friends such as Orhan Ertürk and Mehmet Levent Akman joined the band. They started showing movies and slides while playing. Tolga Acar was added on guitar. Bozkurt went to the military and was replaced by his student Okan Özpoyraz, who was left-handed like him. The second album, Ku ku ku, was made with this lineup. (1991). He wrote and drew in Arredamento Dekorasyon magazine under the direction of Ömer Madra.

He worked as the editor-in-chief of the illustrated novel magazine RR, together with Sarkis Paçacı, Ergün Gündüz and İrfan Sayar. The magazine was deemed pornographic and fell into the courts, but could not be published after two issues. (1992.)

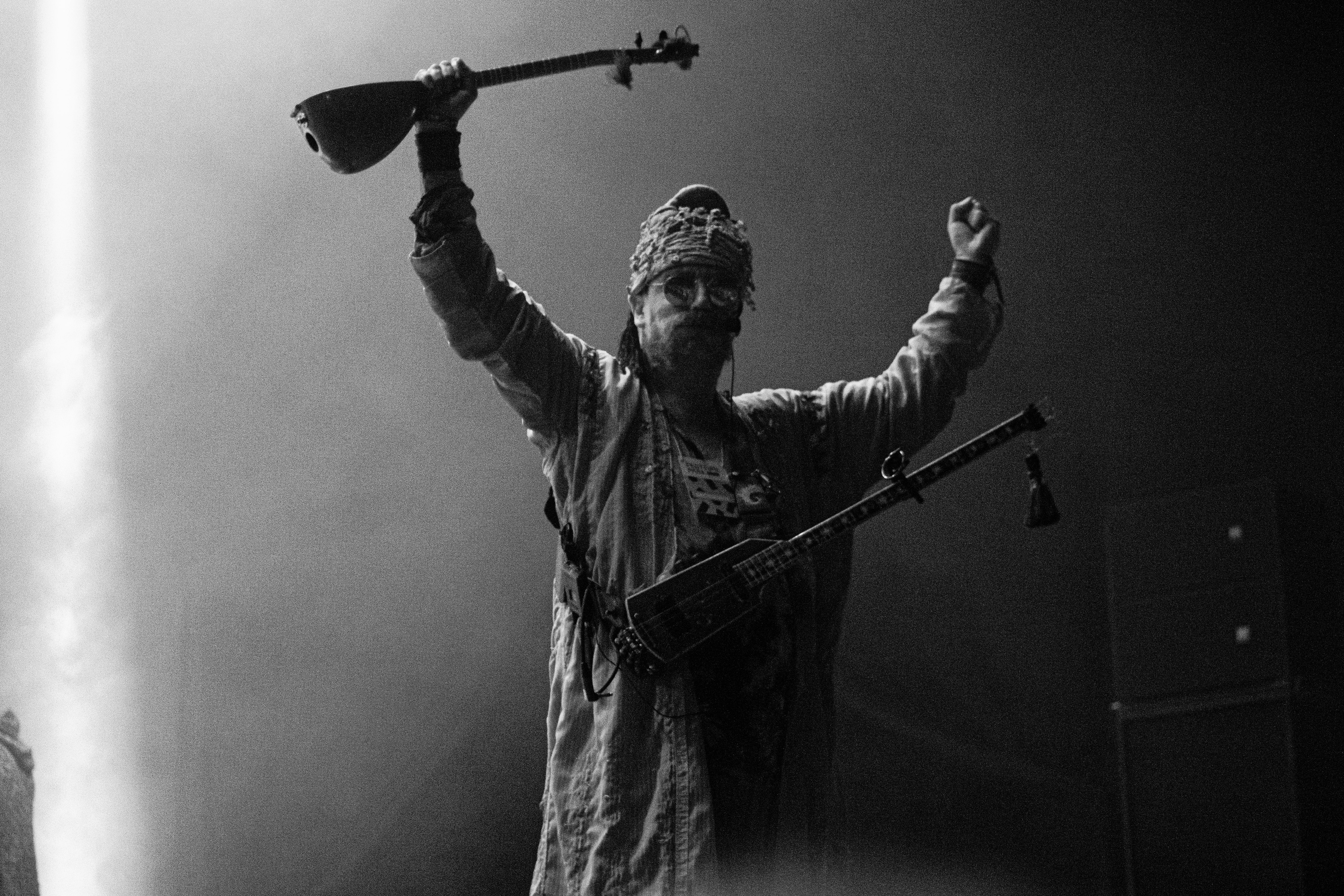
Murat Ertel black and white concert photo taken by Zeynep Gölgesiz

Bülent Tangay (Maximal Punch Effect) on tenor saxophone and later Serhat Ersöz (2/5 BZ) on keyboard were added to the band and they made the concert album called Cemal with this lineup. (1992) He composed music for Nur Akalın's short films. (1992–1993) He composed music for several stop motion commercials with the animation company Anima. They met Esat Başak and made him the visual artist of the group. He started designing pages for Mondo Trasho, one of Turkey's first fanzines. He moved to Maltepe Süreyya Beach and established Plaj Studio.(1993–2005) The album called 13 was released with the first recordings in this studio. (1993) This album consisted of 12 solo songs by 12 ZeN members and was produced by Murat Ertel. Ertel did not have a song on the album. The album was reproduced in 13 copies. He wrote about music in Studio İmage magazine. He entered Marmara University's Cinema and TV department and graduated from there with a master's degree.

Then he rehearsed and recorded concerts with various groups such as Leblebi and Repertuar Köpekleri. He came up with the name of Repertuar Köpekleri (Repertoire Dogs) (the first and original group) (1993) and with this group they played cover songs in rock n roll and blues style in bars such as Kemancı, Roxy, Hayal Kahvesi in Istanbul and achieved commercial success. After the group disbanded within a few months, two more groups with the same name were established in Istanbul and İzmir.

He took part in projects such as Mavi Sakal, İD, Kamu Elka. He started his professional career as a DJ in the Afrika bar at Bilsak İstanbul and then he DJed almost every year, a few times a year, in different venues such as Nu Blu, Bina, Babylon Istanbul, Roxy, Populist. Again at Bilsak African bar he formed a band playing reggae covers with Osman Osman, an African raggamuffin vocalist and with toasting style. Serdar Öztop played guitar, Okan Özpoyraz played drums, Murat Ertel played bass. He played harmonica, barrels and percussion with the Mavi Sakal band between 1992 and 1998. He also attended the band's famous concert at London's Wembley Arena. The harmonica part he played in the song of the same name from the band's album Çektir Git was featured in the movie Kaybedenler Klübü.

In 1993, he recorded an album with the band called Nal Kafalar at Plaj Studio. The album was not released although mixed.

With the addition Tolga Acar on guitar, Adil Sadak on guitar, Remzi Coşkun Sel on darbuka, Nazım Hikmet Richard Dikbaş on vocals and Burak Aktay on guitar, the ZeN album Suda Balık was released. In this album, he played his own invention, the 'few fretted guitar', which has 5 frets and the rest is fretless. (1994)

The album was later released by Ada Music. However, it was re-released digitally as Murat Ertel's solo album by Milhan Music, the company of Metin İlhan, who purchased Hades Records' old cassette agreement with Ertel and the parties were sued. However, although Ertel is included in the album as a performer and composer, Suda Balık is a ZeN album. In 1995, he starred in the music video of Sezen Aksu's song Beni Al onu Alma and performed in concerts with her orchestra.

Mustafa Bahar came and went to the ZeN group from time to time from 1989 to 2015. They also continued with Arat Kaytaz (bass) around 1995. ZeN had periods with no bassist or three bassists. During this period, they made the album called Derya. (1996) The album was released in America by Ecstatic Peace!/Father Yod, the labels of Sonic Youth guitarist Thurston Moore and Byron Colley. Album received various awards from various publications, and was mentioned within lists from the New York Times to Spin magazine. İt was also played by Thurston Moore at radio.

He made music programs called Ses Nefes (1993–1994) on Hür FM radio and then Elektirik (1996–1998) on Açık Radyo. In 1995, Selim Sesler on clarinet started to appear as a guest in both ZeN and BaBa ZuLa, and they also met Brenna MacCrimmon and introduced her to Selim Sesler. In 1996, he founded the band BaBa ZuLa with Mehmet Levent Akman and Emre Onel and gave it its name. The group consisted of three group members who wanted to compose music for Derviş Zaim's film, ignoring the ZeN members who did not want to compose music for the film. At the first concert, they were accompanied by the actors of the movie Tabutta Rövaşata (Sommersault in the Coffin), Ayşen Aydemir, Tuncel Kurtiz and Ahmet Uğurlu, as well as Selim Sesler on clarinet and Fahrettin Aykut on drums. The first permanent guest in the band was bassist Bill Macbeath. Then ZeN's classical lineup consisting of Merih Öztaylan on vocals and electronics, Murat Ertel on vocals, saz and guitar, Levent Akman on percussion, Emre Onel on darbuka percussion and electronics, Bill MacBeath on double bass and bass guitar and Fahri Aykut on drums was established and with this staff, They recorded the album Tanbul(1997) and ZeN at the Bakırköy Mental Hospital. (1998) This concert album was ZeN's last album released. He gave concerts and recorded with the German band Embryo in 1998 and 2000 and took part in the group's album called Istanbul Casablanca (1999). Later, he also took part in their concert album called Embryo Live 2000. (2001)

In 1999, BaBa ZuLa released the music they made for theater plays under the name 17 Music from Three Plays (3 oyundan 17 müzik) under the Doublemoon label. Apart from Tom Waits' constant saxophonist Ralph Carney, Selim Sesler and Brenna MacCrimmon, the half-Native American, half-Scottish American double bassist Bill MacBeath, who became a member of the band, also took part in the album. In 2000, they gave their first concert abroad together with BaBa ZuLa at the Kumanovo Jazz Festival in Macedonia. Apart from the three founding members, this lineup also included today's pop star Göksel on vocals and rhythm guitar, Selim Sesler on clarinet, and Cevdet Erek from Nekropsi on drums. After this concert, he started to give concerts all over the world with BaBa ZuLa, and the concerts he gave abroad were much more effective and more in numbers than the concerts he gave domestically. They composed music for a movie called Renkli Türkçe directed by Ahmet Çadırcı.

He performed the poem named "Kırmızı" with ZeN and Küçük İskender the star poet of the 1990s on. The recording collection was released as a video in a poetry album. In 1999, they gave a concert with a completely different ZeN lineup at the opening of Mengü Ertel's last exhibition in Dolmabahçe. They mixed the concert the next day, played at the exhibition every day for two months, and named this unreleased album Büyültmeler, (blow ups). Mengü Ertel's voice in the album and concert was used as a soloist through samplers. Then Cevdet Erek came on drums. Nazım Dikbaş also returned to vocals. They recorded with this lineup in Ada studios, but the album was not released after discussions.

=== 2000–2010 ===
Discussions within the band escalated when members of the group opposed and did not allow the 24-hour concert the band gave in Maçka to be released as a multi-record vinyl set by Thurston Moore and Byron Colley. Murat Ertel canceled his confirmed ZeN American tour at the last minute due to Mengü Ertel's illness. He was shaken by his father's death in 2000 and decided to disband the ZeN group. They gave their last concert as ZeN at AKM in Taksim in 2000, together with a guest appearance with Semiha Berksoy. After making music for a few commercials and documentaries, he composed music together with BaBa ZuLa for the comedy series called Biz Siz Aşık Olduk, directed by Yavuz Turgul and written by Nilgün Öneş. He brought the theremin to Turkey for the first time and played and recorded it for the first time in Turkey. The song Dep, written about the earthquake and featuring the theremin was included in a compilation album called Floralia vol 4 and was released in Italy. He recorded and produced a song for the Replikas group, which was included in the same album. Between 2002 and 2006, he founded a band called K34 with Levent Akman, recorded together with Jaki Liebezeit, the drummer of the Can band, in Istanbul and Cologne, released an album called Mutlu Kanguru in Germany, and gave concerts in Istanbul and Cologne. BaBa ZuLa released the album Ruhani Oyun Havaları with Mad Professor in 2003. Apart from the old guests in the album, Okan Yılmaz from the band Fairuz Derinbulut and Kerem Demir Atay, now known as Elektro Hafız, also included İzzet Kızıl on percussion, Hüsnü Şenlendirici on clarinet and Oya Erkaya on bass. Deniz Kazma posed with Murat Ertel's instrument named Ruhani on the cover of the album and started dancing with BaBa ZuLa. He founded the Anabala group with Ceren Oykut. The first performances were held in the Anabala passage. They gave concerts in Europe and Cairo. He was a guest at concerts with the band Sıfır namely Zafer Aracagök, and made recordings together. They also played with Yasemin Mori at a concert. He produced Fairuz Derinbulut's first album, Kundante, together with Levent Akman. He played and recorded with Lydia Lunch, whom he had been a fan of since high school. The recordings were not released. They met Japanese dancer Nourah in Istanbul and she started dancing with BaBa ZuLa. In 2005, he appeared in the movie Crossing the Bridge-the Sound of Istanbul, directed by Fatih Akın, with the BaBa ZuLa group and Alexander Hacke. Two songs of the group, Tavus Havası and Cecom, were used in the film. In the same year, they played in Japan for the first time. He left the Plaj studio in 2005. They mixed the recordings at this studio and Mad Professor's Ariwa Studio in London, and the album Duble Oryantal at their newly opened industrial Saniki Studio. Özkan Uğur, Sly & Robbie, Mehmet Güreli and Einstürzende Neubauten band's bassist Alexander Hacke also appeared as guests in the album. The album was the last album featuring Emre Onel, one of the three founding members. In 2006, he composed the music for director Yüksel Aksu's movie Dondurmam Gaymak together with BaBa ZuLa. The album was released in CD format. With the participation of Coşar Kamçı on darbuka and percussion they returned to their original trio format. He designed his first divan electric instrument with the money he won from the lottery and named it Piyango (Lottery). He formed a band called Ü Band with German musicians in Bremen and gave concerts in Germany.

In 2007, BaBa ZuLa released the Roots (Kökler) album, which consists of 4 songs and entirely live recorded improvisations, excluding dub mixes. Tired of albums with many guests, they wanted to return to the band's roots. The only guest was Brenna MacCrimmon, who sang in one composition Aşıkların Sözü Kalır, "Eternal is the word of the poets". They composed this song for the documentary Şeyh Bedreddin, directed by Nurdan Arca, for which they composed the music. He met Esma Ertel in Ankara in 2009. He re-formed MaviGüneş69 with Bahar Sarak and Janet Shook for a single concert and gave a 40th Anniversary concert at Ghetto club. The group rehearsed but disbanded.(2009)

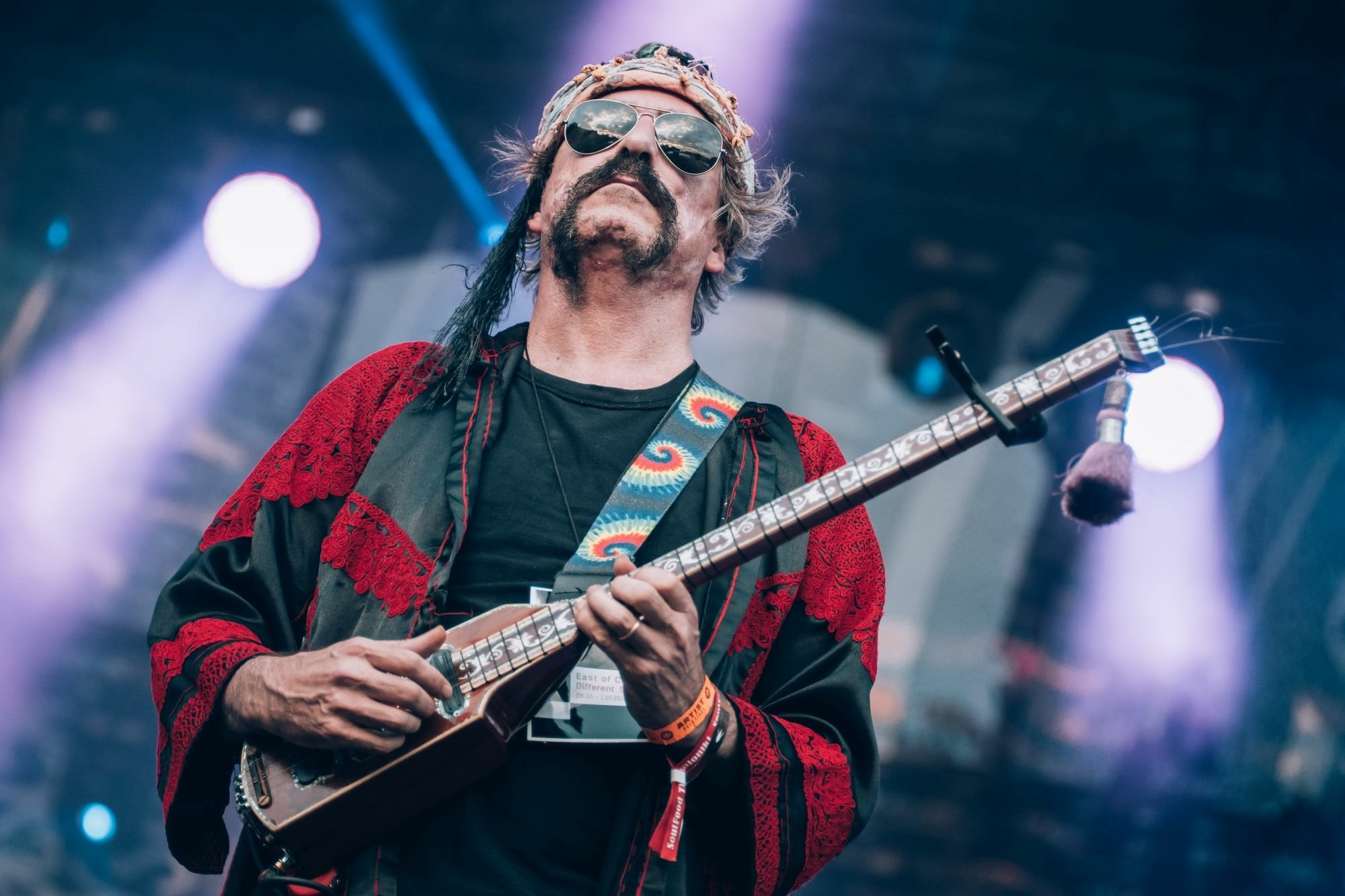
Murat Ertel concert photo

=== 2010–2020 ===
In 2010, Esma Ertel started dancing in BaBa ZuLa. While designing BaBa ZuLa's Gecekondu album in 2011, he benefited from the decorations designed by Mengü Ertel for Haldun Taner's immortal play Keşanlı Ali. In the Gecekondu album, guest appearances include Elena Hristova on vocals, Bugge Wesseltoft synth and Firewater band founder Todd A. on vocals and bass, and Dr. Das; one of the founders of Asian Dub Foundation band. After losing two of his uncles one after the other, he composed songs called Abdülcanbaz for Turhan Selçuk and Efkarlı Yaprak for İlhan Selçuk. He married Esma Ertel in 2012 and their first child, Eren Devran Ertel, was born the same year. Between 2012 and 2016, he performed with a six piece international group called Mythos Orkestra. He released an album with them and gave concerts in Europe. He founded the band Eis Ten Polin in Istanbul with Nikolai Galen on vocals and drummer Gökçe Çeçe Gürçay from the band Gevende. They recorded albums and gave concerts. They released the double album Wild Flowers of Anatolia. Ertel played acoustic instruments such as Macedonian tanbura, cura, divan saz and baglama in this group. (2012)

In 2010, he designed his second electric instrument and named it Ejder. The saz appeared on the cover of the BaBa ZuLa album titled Oto Sanayi, released in 2014, together with Murat Ertel's 1963 Ford Futura brand car. Periklis Tsoukalas on electric oud and Melike Şahin on vocals also took part in the album. Özgür Çakırlar came on percussion. He designed the cover himself and Dilan Bozyel took the photographs. The album was released in France and the world under the name Don't Obey in 2016. In 2014, he gave concerts with Rodrigo Fuentaelba Group in Belgium. He played in Berlin with a band called The Wild Chihuahuas. In 2014, his second child with Esma Ertel, Arel Ertel, was born. Together with the poets of Natama Poetry and literary magazine, for which he has been writing intermittently since 2012, they started a performance series in which he composed all the music live. In 2022, Ot magazine poets also joined them. (2014–2022). He made improvised recordings with the zEEr group in Istanbul. (2015) He tried to re-establish the ZeN group with Mustafa Bahar and Fahrettin Aykut. After a few rehearsals and recordings, they also rehearsed and recorded with Merih Öztaylan, but after arguments, Merih left. After a single special secret concert, this formation also disbanded. They founded the band Rihteremin as a duo with Cevdet Erek on davul and Ertel on Theremin and made recordings. The recordings were not released.

In 2015, he designed the electric saz instrument called Roket, and this instrument was on the cover of their double album XX, which they released with BaBa ZuLa in 2017. This instrument named Roket traveled to six continents of the world with Ertel, and Ertel wrote the name of each city he went to with a black pen on its red case the first time they went. The album was a great success, especially abroad, and entered the European and World music lists. In the same year, they also released the album XX dub. Artists such as Alexander Hacke, Mad Professor, Sly & Robbie, Brenna MacCrimmon, Melike Şahin, Özkan Uğur and La Yegros also appeared as guests in the album. Ümit Adakale appeared in this album for the first time. He designed the album's cover.

His mother had a brain hemorrhage as a result of an accident in 2015. He helped her to regain her memory by playing and making music for her. A year later, he lost her, Ülfet Ertel, who had only a single lung as he learned only in his last years, because of lung failure. She was the leading figure behind the family and carer of the family archives which is important for the Turkish and world history of art.(2016) In 2016, he started a project called Burası TekSaz and played electric saz alone in his recordings and concerts. In 2016, he played electric saz with the Belgian artist Debruit in the tracks Duman and Teknology in his album Debruit & Istanbul. In 2017 he recorded the soundtrack album for the movie of the same name called Turkey on the Edge. The movie was directed by İmre Azem. His artist name OME was used for this soundtrack. He recorded the album Bu Bir Ruya ('This is a Dream') with the band DirtMusic in Istanbul and Ljubjiana. He became one of the main members of the band, along with Hugo Race (Nick Cave & the Bad Seeds, Helixed) and Chris Eckman (The Walkabouts). The first album recording of the instrument named Yaybahar was made with this album. Apart from its inventor Görkem Şen, Ümit Adakale, Gaye Su Akyol and Brenna MacCrimmon appeared as guests. They toured in Europe. (2018) The album won many awards and entered international lists. They also released a limited edition album called Dirtmusic Live.

Ertel, who produces and creates in different art disciplines, also took part in various works as a photographer, art director, director, designer and curator, and took part as a jury member and speaker in various institutions. He wrote for magazines and made drawings for book, magazine and record covers. A year after he lost his beloved friend Jaki Liebezeit, the drummer of the Can band he performed at a memorial concert that was done for Jaki. The band Drums Off Chaos was founded by Jaki with which he performed with Levent Akman and bassist Rosko Gee (Can, Traffic). Other musicians who performed together at the Cologne Philarmonie Hall were Can band members Damo Suzuki and İrmin Schimidt, as well as musicians such as Gianna Nannini, Jah Wobble and Neu band guitarist Michael Rother. He curated Redbull's Round Robin event and organized the concert by performing with 14 musicians, from Lydia Kavina to Cahit Berkay. Together with Nicholas Jerome, he produced the Middle Eastern strings sample library recording for Native Instruments with Istanbul Strings.

He recorded music with Jono Podmore for Japanese director Rika Ohara's film The Giaour. Director Cüneyt Gök shot a documentary film about Murat Ertel called ‘Aşıkların Sözü Kalır'. He made recordings and/or concerts with dozens of artists such as Easy Star All Stars, İlhan Erşahin, Alexander Hacke, Danielle de Piccioto, Jaki Liebezeit, Drums Off Chaos, Mavi Sakal, Patti Smith, İstanbul Blues Kumpanyası, Schneider TM, Sezen Aksu, Debruit, İslandman, Wax Poetic, Hakan Vreskala, İstanbul Sessions, Sumru Ağıryürüyen, Bulutsuzluk Özlemi, Dreadzone, U Roy, Rosko Gee (Traffic), Kabus Kerim, Sabahat Akkiraz, Black Steel, Otoji Ray, Ahmet Güvenç, Bugge Wesseltoft, Mercan Dede, Okay Temiz, Burhan Öçal, Cem Yıldız, Hans Joachim Irmler(*Faust), Tibet Ağırtan, Pentagram, Alcalica, Sly & Robbie, Özkan Uğur, Mehmet Güreli, Fred Frith, Embryo, Dinar Bandosu, Compro Oro, Jojo Mayer, Mad Professor, etc. In the group Mavi Güneş 69, which he started again with his wife Esma Ertel, he composed the songs "3 Çember" and "Yafta" (2019) in the same year together with her. They recorded those two songs with their children and it was his first 7" vinyl. BaBa ZuLa's album Derin Derin was released the same year. Apart from the two founding members, the album featured Ümit Adakale on percussion and Periklis Tsoukalas on baritone electric oud. His wife Esma Ertel and their sons Eren Devran and Arel Ertel also appeared in the album as guests. Arel Ertel sang the song "Salıncaksın" to his father on the swing and wrote the lyrics and composed together with his father. Esma Ertel had the idea of creating a book and an exhibition called "Dostun Çekmecesinden" which collected works of a great Turkish painter called Mehmet Güleryüz. He composed compositions with Esma Ertel, shot short films and gave an opening concert for that exhibition "From the Friend's Drawer – Cihat Burak Works from the Mengü Ertel Collection" (2019). He was the curator and art director of the Uzelli Elektro Saz (1976–1984) compilation album together with Esma Ertel. In 2019, he released the EP titled Kızıl Gözlüm with BaBa ZuLa on Glitterbeat Records. Arastaman and Schneider TM remixes of the song Kervan Yolda were also included in the EP.

=== 2020–present ===
He wrote and drew in Bavul magazine every month, starting from July 2020. The Belgian acid jazz band Compro Oro released a concept album called "Simurg" with him and Esma Ertel, and the album was chosen as one of the best jazz albums of 2020 by Bandcamp. He designed the cover together with her. He undertook the cover designs of BaBa ZuLa's 2020 album titled Hayvan Gibi and the latest album of the Moğollar group, Anatolian Sun, together with Esma Ertel. He produced both albums. The albums were recorded completely analog in Haarlem using the direct to disc recording method. (Nightdreamer Records). He played cura in Kathleen Blackwell's song Mothers Hope and took part as a composer with Peter Gabriel's bassist Tony Levin (2020) He took part in Barış Demirel and DaPoet's EP titled DPBD with his compositions named Dün 1 Bugün 1 and wrote lyrics. (2020) He performed at a dream scene with BaBa ZuLa in the movie Dersaadet Apartmanı, directed by Tankut Kılınç. (2020) He played electric saz in Kathleen Blackwell's song Army of Love and its remix (2020). Covered Sezen Aksu's song called Kaçın Kurası with Deniz Tekin, together with Serhat Ersöz and BaBa ZuLa (2021). Brazilian director Adriana Corderio made a documentary film about BaBa ZuLa called Constantly Flying. The film was shown in Turkey and globally. (2021). Veys Çolak started working as bass guitarist in BaBa ZuLa. (2021). He composed the music for the movie The Syrian Cosmonaut, directed by Charles Emir Richards. The film was shown at national and international festivals and received many awards. (2022). He wrote lyrics, played saz and sang vocals for Dirtmusic's songs Hum Hum and Western Lands (2022). He played and recorded Theremin in the song Twin Flames with the band Reptillians from Andromeda. (2022). Gonca Feride Varol (synthesizer) and Olcay Bozkurt (bass guitar and double bass) started performing with BaBa ZuLa and recording together. He played at Beykoz Kundura factory with Okay Temiz and Murat Beşer and made a program on the theme of Domestic Goods. (2022). He played electric saz with Genjah and Emir Erünsal and released two songs named Dubokrasi and Sunflower. Carefree EP (2022)

She took part in the Air Anatolia project with artists such as İslandman, Veyasin, Cahit Berkay, Okay Temiz and Ahmet Güvenç, and sang vocals in two songs, playing electric saz and cura, at the London Jazz Festival and in Istanbul. (2022) He joined with the Musik Susmayacak Kolektifi (Music wont Stop Collective) and performed and recorded his composition titled Aşıkların Söz Kalır, together with about 70 artists such as Hayko Cepkin, Pentagram, Mercan Dede, Kemal Sahir Gürel, Ayşe Tütüncü, Ayşenur Kolivar, Sabahat Akkiraz and more. (2023) He played electric saz in Ada Sanlıman's single Kim İnanır Artık Aşka, produced by Doğan Duru. (2023) He took part in the documentary Sesler Suretler, directed by Gökçe Demirkıran, and composed its music. (2023) A documentary was made about him by Melissa Tatlıcı on the channel called Avant D'Art. (2023)

He redesigned the Bakırköy Mental Hospital concert album of the ZeN group. Ronan Chris Murphy, the sound and mastering engineer of the band King Crimson handled the mastering of the record. The album was released on vinyl in Turkey by Ada Music and overseas by Zelzele Records. (2023) On the commemoration night of Erkin Koray, he appeared as a guest artist with Hey Douglas at the Vintage Festival in Istanbul and played the Koray song Hayat Katarı with Ahmet Güvenç. (2023) Together with Esma Ertel, Genjah and Murat Ertel, released a song called 'Asya Velvele Dub' as a single from BBI. (2023) He released two songs, Feltuener Huette and European Bridge, with Ulrich Troyer, and also co-produced the album Transit Tribe with the artist (2024). Ertel, who is a founding member of many bands, especially BaBa ZuLa, performs his art on 6 continents in various countries of the world, from India to Brazil, and makes music with artists such as Jaki Liebezeit, Fred Frith, Mad Professor and Semiha Berksoy, whom he was inspired by in his youth. Murat Ertel, who speaks English, is married and has two children. He is a member of MESAM and MUYORBİR professional associations for composing and performing.

== Discography ==
Singles & EP's

- Mavi Güneş 69 - Yafta / 3 Çember - (2019)
- BaBa ZuLa - Kızıl Gözlüm EP - (2019)
- Mavi Güneş 69 - Ressam Masalı (2019)
- Mavi Güneş 69 - Cihat Burak 99 -(2019)
- Kathleen Blackwell - Mothers Hope - (2020)
- Barış Demirel & DaPoet DPBD EP - Dün 1 Bugün 1 - (2020)
- Kathleen Blackwell - Army of Love - (2020)
- BaBa ZuLa feat. Deniz Tekin - Kaçın Kurası - (2021)
- Dirtmusic - Hum Hum - (2022)
- Dirtmusic - Western Lands - (2022)
- Reptillians from Andromeda - Twin Flames - (2022)
- Genjah & Emir Erünsal - Dubokrasi - (2022)
- Genjah & Emir Erünsal - Sunflower - (2022)
- Müzik Susmayacak Kolektif (Hayko Cepkin, Pentagram, Mercan Dede, Kemal Sahir Gürel, Ayşe Tütüncü, Ayşenur Kolivar, Sabahat Akkiraz with almost 70 artists) - Aşıkların Sözü Kalır - (2023)
- Ada Sanlıman - Kim İnanır Artık Aşka - (2023)
- Esma Ertel, Genjah & Murat Ertel - Asya Velvele Dub - (2023)
- Genjah & Murat Ertel - Aslında Dünya Daha Hızlı - (2023)
- Ulrich Troyer - Feltuener Huette - (2024)
- Esma Ertel & Murat Ertel - Garden of Kibele - (2024)

Albums

- Two of One - Night Walker - (1978)
- ZeN - Uzay 1989 - (1989)
- ZeN - Ku Ku Ku - (1991)
- Mavi Sakal-Çektir Git - (1992)
- ZeN - Cemal - (1992)
- İstanbul Blues Kumpanyası - Kökler - (1993)
- ZeN - 13 - (1994)
- ZeN-Suda Balık - (1995)
- ZeN - Derya - (1996)Ecstatic Peace / Father Yod
- BaBa ZuLa -Tabutta Rövaşata-Orijinal Film Müzikleri - (1996)
- ZeN - Tanbul - (1998)
- Embryo - İstanbul Casablanca - (1999)
- BaBa ZuLa - 3 Oyundan 17 Müzik - (1999)
- ZeN - Bakırköy Akıl Hastanesi’nde - (1999)
- Embryo - Live 2000 Vol. 1 - (2001)
- BaBa ZuLa & Mad Professor - Ruhani Oyun Havaları - (Psychebelly Dance Music) - (2003)
- Fairuz Derin Bulut - Kundante - (2003)
- BaBa ZuLa & Mad Professor - Duble Oryantal - (2005)
- K-34 & Jaki Liebezeit - Mutlu Kanguru - (2006)
- BaBa ZuLa Dondurmam Gaymak - Soundtrack (2006)
- BaBa ZuLa - Kökler (Roots) - (2007)
- Dinar Bandosu - Saykodelikdeşik - (2007)
- Alexander Hacke & Danielle De Picciotto - Ship of Fools - (2008)
- Dinar Bandosu - Aya da Gidelim Osman - (2009)
- BaBa ZuLa - Gecekondu - (2010)
- Mythos Orchestra - Mythos 7 Sois Orchestra - (2013)
- BaBa ZuLa - 34 Oto Sanayi - (2014) Rainbow 45 (same album as Do not Obey (2015))
- DJ Tudo - Pancada Motor Manifesto da Festa (2014)
- Eis Ten Polin - Wild Flowers of Anatolia - (2015) - Voice of Shade
- Debruit - Debruit and İstanbul - (2016)
- Sabahat Akkiraz ve dostları - 47 - (2017)
- BaBa ZuLa - XX - (2017)
- BaBa ZuLa - XX Dub - (2017)
- OME - Turkey on the Edge (Soundtrack) - (2017)
- Dirtmusic - Bu Bir Ruya - (2018)
- BaBa ZuLa - Derin Derin - (2019)
- Compro Oro, Esma Ertel & Murat Ertel - Simurg - (2020)
- BaBa ZuLa - Hayvan Gibi - (2020)
- Moğollar - Eastern Sun vol. 1 & 2 - (2020)
- DJ Tudo - Pancada Motor - (2021)
- Ulrich Troyer - Transit Tribe - (2024)
- BaBa ZuLa - İstanbul Sokakları - (2024)

Compilations

- Floralia Vol 1, - (1996)
- Sesimizi Yükseltiyoruz - (1998)
- Aksi İstikamet - (1999)
- Floralia vol. 4 - (2002)
- Vegetable Man 10” Project - (2003)
- BaBa ZuLa - Box Set - (2005)
- Crossing the Bridge - (Sound of İstanbul) Soundtrack Fatih Akın - (2005)
- BaBa ZuLa - Remixes - (2012)
- Kaset Zamanları - (2015)
- Saz Power - (2018)
- Uzelli Elektro Saz (1976–1984) Compilation curated by Esma Ertel & Murat Ertel - (2019)
