= List of Cyprus problem films =

Below is an incomplete list of feature films, television films or television series which include events of the Cyprus problem. This list does not include documentaries or short films.

== 1950s ==
Year	Country	Main title (Alternative title)	Original title (Original script)	Director	Subject
1959	Turkey	Cyprus Martyrs	Kıbrıs Şehitleri	Behlül Dal	Drama, War.
1959	Turkey	The Curse of Cyprus: Red Eoka; For the Sake of the Homeland	Kıbrıs'ın Belası Kızıl Eoka; Vatan Uğruna	Nişan Hançer	

== 1960s ==
Year	Country	Main title (Alternative title)	Original title (Original script)	Director	Subject
1962	United Kingdom	Private Potter		Caspar Wrede	Drama, War. Cyprus Emergency
1964	United States	Act of Reprisal		Erricos Andreou; Robert Tronson	Drama, War. Cyprus Emergency
1964	Turkey	Ten Fearless Men	On Korkusuz Adam	Tunç Başaran	Adventure, War. Remake of The Magnificent Seven. Cypriot intercommunal violence
1964	United Kingdom	The High Bright Sun		Ralph Thomas	Adventure, Drama, War. Cyprus Emergency
1965	Finland	A Shot on Cyprus	Laukaus Kyproksessa	Åke Lindman	Drama, Romance. United Nations Peacekeeping Force in Cyprus
1965	Turkey	Cyprus Volcano: The Epic of the Rampaging Mujahideen	Kıbrıs Volkanı: Şahlanan Mücahitlerin Destanı	Ural Ozon	Drama, War.
1965	Turkey	Revenge of the eagles: Those who died in love..	Kartallarin öcü: Severek ölenler..	Osman F. Seden	Drama, Romance, War.
1965	Greece; Cyprus	The island of Aphrodite	Το νησί της Αφροδίτης	Giorgos Skalenakis	Drama. Cyprus Emergency
1966	Turkey	Storm Fives	Fırtına Beşler	Aram Gülyüz	Adventure.
1966	Turkey	The Female Enemy	Dişi Düşman	Nejat Saydam	Adventure, Drama.
1966	United Kingdom; Cyprus	The Private Right		Michael Papas	Drama, War. Cyprus Emergency
1966	Turkey	The bouncers	Fedailer	Kayahan Arikan	Adventure, War.
1966	Turkey	Those Who Fight With Love	Severek Döğüşenler	Adnan Saner	Adventure, War.
1966	Turkey	Beloved in the Sky	Göklerdeki Sevgili	Remzi Aydın Jöntürk	Drama, Romance, War.
1966	Turkey	Three fearless friends	Üç Korkusuz Arkadaş	Halit Refiğ	Drama, War.
1968	Greece	In front of the gallows	Μπροστά στην αγχόνη	Kostas Asimakopoulos	Drama. Cyprus Emergency
1968	Turkey	Fedai Commandos in Cyprus	Fedai Komandolar Kıbrıs'ta	Nejat Okçugil	Adventure, Drama, War.
1968	Turkey	The Commandos Are Coming	Komandolar Geliyor	Nejat Okçugil	Adventure, Drama, War.

== 1970s ==
Year	Country	Main title (Alternative title)	Original title (Original script)	Director	Subject
1970	Italy; West Germany; Yugoslavia	Rendezvous with Dishonour	Appuntamento col disonore	Adriano Bolzoni	Drama, Thriller, War. Cyprus Emergency
1973	Turkey	Our Mission is Impossible	Görevimiz Tehlike	Yavuz Figenli	Action.
1974	Turkey	Martyrs	Şehitler	Çetin İnanç	Action, Adventure, War. Turkish invasion of Cyprus
1974	Turkey	Dungeon	Zindan	Remzi Aydın Jöntürk	Adventure.
1974	Turkey	Eagle's Nest	Kartal Yuvası	Natuk Baytan	Drama, Thriller. Cypriot intercommunal violence
1974	Turkey	Captive Life	Esir Hayat	Lütfi Ömer Akad	Drama, Romance.
1974	Turkey	Migration	Göç	Remzi Aydın Jöntürk	Drama.
1974	Turkey	Homeland First	Önce Vatan	Duygu Sağıroğlu	Drama, War. Turkish invasion of Cyprus
1975	Turkey	Cyprus Fedaians	Kıbrıs Fedaileri	Müjdat Saylav	Adventure, War.
1975	Turkey	Turkish Lions in Cyprus	Kıbrısda Türk Aslanları	Kayahan Arikan	Adventure, War.
1975	Turkey	Victory Eagles in Cyprus	Zafer Kartalları Kibris'ta	Seyfi Havaeri	Drama, War.
1975	Turkey	Sezercik Little Mujahid	Sezercik Küçük Mücahit	Ertem Göreç	Drama, War.
1977	Turkey	I Cannot Live Without You	Sensiz Yaşayamam	Metin Erksan	Drama, Romance.
1978	Greece	A race without end	Αγώνας χωρίς τέλος	Pantelis Skroubelos	Action, War.
1979	Turkey	Last Time With You	Seninle Son Defa	Feyzi Tuna	Drama.

== 1980s ==
Year	Country	Main title (Alternative title)	Original title (Original script)	Director	Subject
1983	Greece	Peerless Flirts	Αχτύπητα... καμάκια!!	Omiros Efstratiadis	Comedy.
1985	Cyprus; Greece	The Rape of Aphrodite	Ο βιασμός της Αφροδίτης	Andreas Pantzis	Drama.
1986	Turkey	Hook	Kanca	Melih Gülgen	Adventure.
1987	Cyprus	A Detail in Cyprus	Λεπτομέρεια στην Κύπρο	Panicos Chrysanthou	Drama.
1987	Cyprus	Tomorrow's Warrior	Αυριανός Πολεμιστής	Michael Papas	Drama, War.

== 1990s ==
Year	Country	Main title (Alternative title)	Original title (Original script)	Director	Subject
1993	Turkey	Operation Code Name: Long Live the Fatherland!	Vatan Sağolsun	Kunt Tulgar	Action, War.
1996	Cyprus	Roads and Oranges	Δρόμοι και πορτοκάλια	Aliki Danezi-Knutsen	Drama.
1999	Bulgaria; Germany; Greece; Cyprus	The Road to Ithaca		Kostas Dimitriou	Drama, Romance.

== 2000s ==
Year	Country	Main title (Alternative title)	Original title (Original script)	Director	Subject
2001	Greece; Cyprus; United Kingdom	Under the Stars		Christos Georgiou	Drama.
2001	Turkey	Vizontele		Yılmaz Erdoğan; Ömer Faruk Sorak	Comedy, Drama, History.
2003	Turkey; Cyprus; Italy	Mud	Çamur	Derviş Zaim	Drama.
2006	Cyprus; Turkey; Hungary; Greece	Akamas	Ακάμας	Panicos Chrysanthou	Drama. Cypriot intercommunal violence
2009	Greece; Cyprus	Guilt		Vassilis Mazomenos	Drama, History, Thriller.

== 2010s ==
Year	Country	Main title (Alternative title)	Original title (Original script)	Director	Subject
2010	Turkey	Shadows and Faces	Gölgeler ve Suretler	Derviş Zaim	Drama. Cypriot intercommunal violence
2012	Turkey	Whispers of Dead Zone	Ölü Bölgeden Fısıltılar	Fırat Çağrı Beyaz	Adventure, Drama.
2012	United Kingdom; Turkey; Cyprus	Code Name Venus	Kod Adı: Venüs	Tamer Garip	Action, Adventure, Romance.
2013	Turkey	My Aunt Is Here	Halam Geldi	Erhan Kozan	Drama.
2016	Cyprus; Greece	The Story of the Green Line	Η ιστορία της πράσινης γραμμής	Panicos Chrysanthou	United Nations Buffer Zone in Cyprus
2018	Cyprus	Sunrise in Kimmeria		Simon Farmakas	Comedy.
2019	Greece; Cyprus; United Kingdom	Siege on Liperti Street	Πολιορκία στην οδό Λιπέρτη	Stavros Pamballis	Action, Drama, Thriller.

== Television films ==
Year	Country	Main title (Alternative title)	Original title (Original script)	Director	Subject
1961	United Kingdom	The Interrogator		John Jacobs	Drama. Cyprus Emergency
1995	Cyprus	The groom of freedom	Ο γαμπρός της λευτεριάς	Maria Avraamidou	Drama, History, Romance.

== Television series ==
Year	Country	Main title (Alternative title)	Original title (Original script)	Director	Subject
1988	Turkey	Those Who Shot in Cyprus	Kıbrıs'ta Vuruşanlar	Yücel Uçanoğlu	Drama, War.
2021-22	Turkey	Once Upon a Time in Cyprus	Bir Zamanlar Kıbrıs	Hakan İnan; Osman Taşcı; Barış Erçetin	Action, History. Cypriot intercommunal violence
2024	Greece; Cyprus	Famagusta		Andreas Georgiou	Drama, History, Mystery. Turkish invasion of Cyprus
