= Tabutta Rövaşata =

Tabutta Rovaşata may refer to:

- Tabutta Rovaşata (film), a 1996 Turkish film by Derviş Zaim
- Tabutta Rovaşata (soundtrack), a 1996 Turkish album by Baba Zula
