= List of 2006 box office number-one films in Turkey =

This is a list of films which have placed number one at the weekly box office in Turkey during 2006. The weeks start on Fridays, and finish on Thursdays. The box-office number one is established in terms of tickets sold during the week.

== Box office number-one films ==
†	This implies the highest-grossing movie of the year.

Date	Title	Studio	Gross	Ref
January 6, 2006	Wacky Class 3,5	Maxximum Film und Kunst GmbH	$2,105,075	
January 13, 2006	Wacky Class 3,5	Maxximum Film und Kunst GmbH	$1,884,297	
January 20, 2006	Wacky Class 3,5	Maxximum Film und Kunst GmbH	$800,977	
January 27, 2006	My Father and My Son	Avşar Film	$636,602	
February 3, 2006	Valley of the Wolves: Iraq †	Pana Film	$5,782,496	
February 10, 2006	Valley of the Wolves: Iraq †	Pana Film	$3,834,368	
February 17, 2006	Valley of the Wolves: Iraq †	Pana Film	$1,899,449	
February 24, 2006	Valley of the Wolves: Iraq †	Pana Film	$935,935	
March 3, 2006	Valley of the Wolves: Iraq †	Pana Film	$500,499	
March 10, 2006	Hostel	Next Entertainment & Raw Nerve	$379,675	
March 17, 2006	Shattered Soul	Altioklar Productions	$329,498	
March 24, 2006	The Pink Panther	Metro-Goldwyn-Mayer Pictures, Columbia Pictures, & Robert Simonds Productions	$265,258	
March 31, 2006	Basic Instinct 2	C2 Pictures, Intermedia, & Kanzaman	$456,033	
April 7, 2006	Basic Instinct 2	C2 Pictures, Intermedia, & Kanzaman	$274,414	
April 14, 2006	Ice Age: The Meltdown	Blue Sky Studios & 20th Century Fox Animation	$985,834	
April 21, 2006	Ice Age: The Meltdown	Blue Sky Studios & 20th Century Fox Animation	$768,053	
April 28, 2006	Ice Age: The Meltdown	Blue Sky Studios & 20th Century Fox Animation	$519,986	
May 5, 2006	Mission: Impossible III	Paramount Pictures & Cruise/Wagner Productions	$813,867	
May 12, 2006	Mission: Impossible III	Paramount Pictures & Cruise/Wagner Productions	$308,901	
May 19, 2006	The Da Vinci Code	Columbia Pictures, Imagine Entertainment, Skylark Productions, & Government of Malta	$1,682,646	
May 26, 2006	The Da Vinci Code	Columbia Pictures, Imagine Entertainment, Skylark Productions, & Government of Malta	$688,877	
June 2, 2006	The Da Vinci Code	Columbia Pictures, Imagine Entertainment, Skylark Productions, & Government of Malta	$369,114	
June 9, 2006	The Da Vinci Code	Columbia Pictures, Imagine Entertainment, Skylark Productions, & Government of Malta	$240,147	
June 16, 2006	The Da Vinci Code	Columbia Pictures, Imagine Entertainment, Skylark Productions, & Government of Malta	$140,325	
June 23, 2006	Poseidon	Virtual Studios, Irwin Allen Productions, Next Entertainment, Radiant Productions, Synthesis Entertainment	$249,981	
June 30, 2006	Poseidon	Virtual Studios, Irwin Allen Productions, Next Entertainment, Radiant Productions, Synthesis Entertainment	$158,465	
July 7, 2006	Poseidon	Virtual Studios, Irwin Allen Productions, Next Entertainment, Radiant Productions, Synthesis Entertainment	$116,714	
July 14, 2006	Pirates of the Caribbean: Dead Man's Chest	Walt Disney Pictures & Jerry Bruckheimer Films	$1,228,762	
July 21, 2006	Pirates of the Caribbean: Dead Man's Chest	Walt Disney Pictures & Jerry Bruckheimer Films	$621,090	
July 28, 2006	Pirates of the Caribbean: Dead Man's Chest	Walt Disney Pictures & Jerry Bruckheimer Films	$389,364	
August 4, 2006	Pirates of the Caribbean: Dead Man's Chest	Walt Disney Pictures & Jerry Bruckheimer Films	$233,716	
August 11, 2006	The Break-Up	Wild West Picture Show Productions	$161,005	
August 18, 2006	Garfield: A Tail of Two Kitties	20th Century Fox, Davis Entertainment Company, Dune Entertainment, Major Studio Partners, & Ingenious Film Partners	$332,993	
August 25, 2006	Garfield: A Tail of Two Kitties	20th Century Fox, Davis Entertainment Company, Dune Entertainment, Major Studio Partners, & Ingenious Film Partners	$225,284	
September 1, 2006	Crank	Lakeshore Entertainment & RadicalMedia	$161,767	
September 8, 2006	Miami Vice	Forward Pass, Metropolis Films, Motion Picture ETA, &Produktionsgesellschaft	$268,781	
September 15, 2006	Cars	Pixar Animation Studios	$508,025	
September 22, 2006	Click	Columbia Pictures, Revolution Studios, Happy Madison Productions, & Original Film	$333,227	
September 29, 2006	Click	Columbia Pictures, Revolution Studios, Happy Madison Productions, & Original Film	$243,240	
October 6, 2006	The Devil Wears Prada	Fox 2000 Pictures, Wendy Finerman Productions, & Dune Entertainment	$179,200	
October 13, 2006	The Devil Wears Prada	Fox 2000 Pictures, Wendy Finerman Productions, & Dune Entertainment	$167,147	
October 20, 2006	The Magician	Beşiktaş Kültür Merkezi	$1,462,608	
October 27, 2006	The Magician	Beşiktaş Kültür Merkezi	$1,378,666	
November 3, 2006	Saw III	Twisted Pictures	$692,358	
November 10, 2006	The Exam	Böcek Yapım	$504,238	
November 17, 2006	Casino Royale	Metro-Goldwyn-Mayer, Columbia Pictures, & Eon Productions	$446,321	
November 24, 2006	Ice Cream, I Scream	Hermès Film & Makara Film	$393,908	
December 1, 2006	Ice Cream, I Scream	Hermès Film & Makara Film	$405,316	
December 8, 2006	Ice Cream, I Scream	Hermès Film & Makara Film	$414,922	
December 15, 2006	Turks in Space	Tiglon Film & Zero Film	$527,916	
December 22, 2006	The Little Apocalypse	Limon Film	$295,606	
December 29, 2006	The Little Apocalypse	Limon Film	$145,651	

== Highest-grossing films ==
=== In-Year Release ===
Highest-grossing films of 2006 by In-year release
Rank	Title	Distributor	Domestic gross
1.	Valley of the Wolves: Iraq	KenDa	₺27.434.893
2.	Hababam Sınıfı 3,5	Özen	₺12.950.656
3.	The Magician	KenDa	₺12.866.545
4.	The Exam	Özen	₺7.847.490
5.	The Da Vinci Code	Warner Bros.	₺7.466.333
6.	Pirates of the Caribbean: Dead Mans Chest	UIP	₺7.182.112
7.	Keloğlan Kara Prens'e Karşı	KenDa	₺6.517.326
8.	Ice Age: The Meltdown	Özen	₺6.201.177
9.	Hacivat Karagöz Neden Öldürüldü?	KenDa	₺4.233.546
10.	Ice Cream, I Scream	Özen	₺3.775.735
