= Memet Ali Alabora =

Turkish film and theatre actor

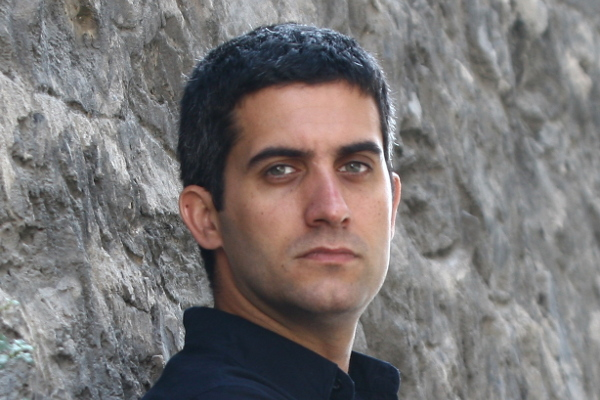
- Born: 25 November 1977 (age 47); Istanbul, Turkey
- Occupation: Actor
- Years active: 1994-present
- Spouse: Pınar Öğün (m. 2009; div. 2021)

Memet Ali Alabora (born 25 November 1977) is a Turkish film and theatre actor. He is the son of actors Mustafa Alabora and Betül Arım.

He is best known for the crime comedy "Yılan Hikayesi". With Sanem Çelik, he acted in the series "Kara Melek", "Canım Kocacım", film "Ayın Karanlık Yüzü".

In 1999, he played the lead role in the film Kayıkçı ("Boatman"), a Turkish-Greek joint production. He played in sequels of cult films "Hababam Sınıfı" (1974). He appeared in film "Yedi Kocalı Hürmüz" based on a cult play. He acted in comedy-crime film series "Maskeli Beşler".

== Biography ==
The eldest child of a family of artists, Alabora's first performing experiences were in the plays The Matchmaker, Fiddler on the Roof, and West Side Story, which were performed in English by the theater branch of his school. In high school, Alabora also acted in plays by Shakespeare and Orhan Veli. In 1994, with support from his high school, Özel Boğaziçi Lisesi, Alabora founded a semi-professional theater.

His first professional acting position was in the play Acaba Hangisi?, performed at the Tiyatro Istanbul. At the same time, between 1995 and 1997, he worked as a reporter for the TV program A Takımı ("The A Team"), broadcast on ATV.

Alabora graduated from the Theater Department of the Istanbul University State Conservatory. He received his master's degree from Yıldız Technical University's Faculty of Art and Design. Alabora is one of the founders of garajistanbul, a contemporary performing arts institution where he worked until May 2010. He is married to actress Pınar Öğün.

In 2011 he was awarded a Tarzan of Manisa award.

In 2012 he financed, starred in and directed Mi Minör.

Alabora is an activist in favor of civil rights and the environment; in 2013 he supported the Gezi protests. Because of his support for the protests, and because of the way the media had shown clips of the Mi Minör play, Alabora and his teammates "felt it would be better to leave the country." They left and settled in Cardiff, Wales

== Stage ==
- 1998 Hommage to Çiğdem Talu (Istanbul University State Conservatory)
- 1998–2010 Acaba Hangisi? (Tiyatro İstanbul) - Vladi
- 1999 Uzakta Piyano Sesleri (Piano Sounds From Distance) (İ.Ü. Devlet Konservaturarı) - Stanislavski
- 2003–04 The Taming Of The Shrew (Istanbul City Theatre) - Petruchio
- 2008 Hüsn-ü Aşk'a Dair (Istanbul State Opera and Ballet) - Narrator
- 2008–10 Histanbul (garajistanbulpro) - Ali Bora
- 2009–10 Muhabir (10+) - Memet Ali Alabora
- 2012–13 Mi Minor (EEMPCM) - President
- 2014 Gegen Die Wand (Theater Freiburg) - President

== Filmography ==
=== Movies ===
Films
Year	Title	Role
1999	Kayıkçı	Kayıkçı
2002	Abdülhamit Düşerken	Soldier Arif
2003	Sır Çocukları	Reşo
2004	Hababam Sınıfı Merhaba	Matkap Emre
2005	Hababam Sınıfı Askerde	Matkap Emre
2005	Şans Kapıyı Kırınca	Passenger
2005	Ayın Karanlık Yüzü	Yusuf
2005	Maskeli Beşler İntikam Peşinde	Murat
2005	Dondurmam Gaymak	Acting Instructor
2006	Hababam Sınıfı 3,5	Matkap Emre
2006	Eve Dönüş	Mustafa
2008	Gölge	Şerif
2009	Yedi Kocalı Hürmüz	Hüsrev (Doctor)
2011	Entelköy Efeköy'e Karşı	Oyun Tasarımı
2017	Trendy	Mehmet
2018	To Provide All People	A&E Consultant

=== TV serials ===
- 1996 Kara Melek - Hakan
- 1999 Yılan Hikayesi - Memoli
- 2002 Kınalı Kar - (Guest role)
- 2003 Canım Kocacım - Can Berke
- 2004 Kasırga İnsanları
- 2004 Hayalet - Sonat
- 2006 Karınca Yuvası - Engin
- 2013 Galip Derviş - Zafer Uzungöl
- 2017 Keeping Faith as Luca Samaras
- 2018 Dark Heart as Nick Kyriacou
- 2021 Fflam as Deniz
- 2022 Four Lives as Sami Sak
- 2022 Y Golau as Murat Özdemir
- 2022 The Serpent Queen as Sultan Suleiman I

=== Short film ===
- 2002 Pamuk Prenses - Young Man
- 2019 Involuntary Activist - Hakan

=== Programming ===
- 2010 Heberler - Çeşitli

== Other works ==
- 1995–1997 ATV A Team News Programme - Reporter
- 2001–2003 Notada Yazmayanlar "Classical Music Programme" (Radyo Kozmos) - Together with Emir Gamsızoğlu producer and host
- 2001 The Road To Eldorada- Tulio's voiceover
- 2002–2007 tr:Müjdat Gezen Sanat Merkezi (Mujdat Gezen Art Center) - Stage instructor
- 2002–2008 Andante Magazine - Editor, writer - Shared column with pianist Emir Gamsızoğlu
- 2007–2010 garajistanbul - Board member, communications director
- 2008 Çevre Bey - Çevre Bey's voiceover and model for the character
- 2008 Goldberg Variations Journey (Classical Music Project) - Together with pianist Emir Gamsızoğlu design and host
- 2009–2010 Notada Yazmayanlar for Children (İş Sanat) - Together with pianist Emir Gamsızoğlu design and host
- 2010 Chopin's 200th Birthday, Cemal Reşit Rey Concert Hall, (Classical Music Project) - Together with pianist Emir Gamsızoğlu design and host
- 2011 Oyuncular Sendikası (Union of Actors) - Chairman
- 2012 Mi Minör - Director
