= Baba Zula =

Turkish musical group

BaBa ZuLa
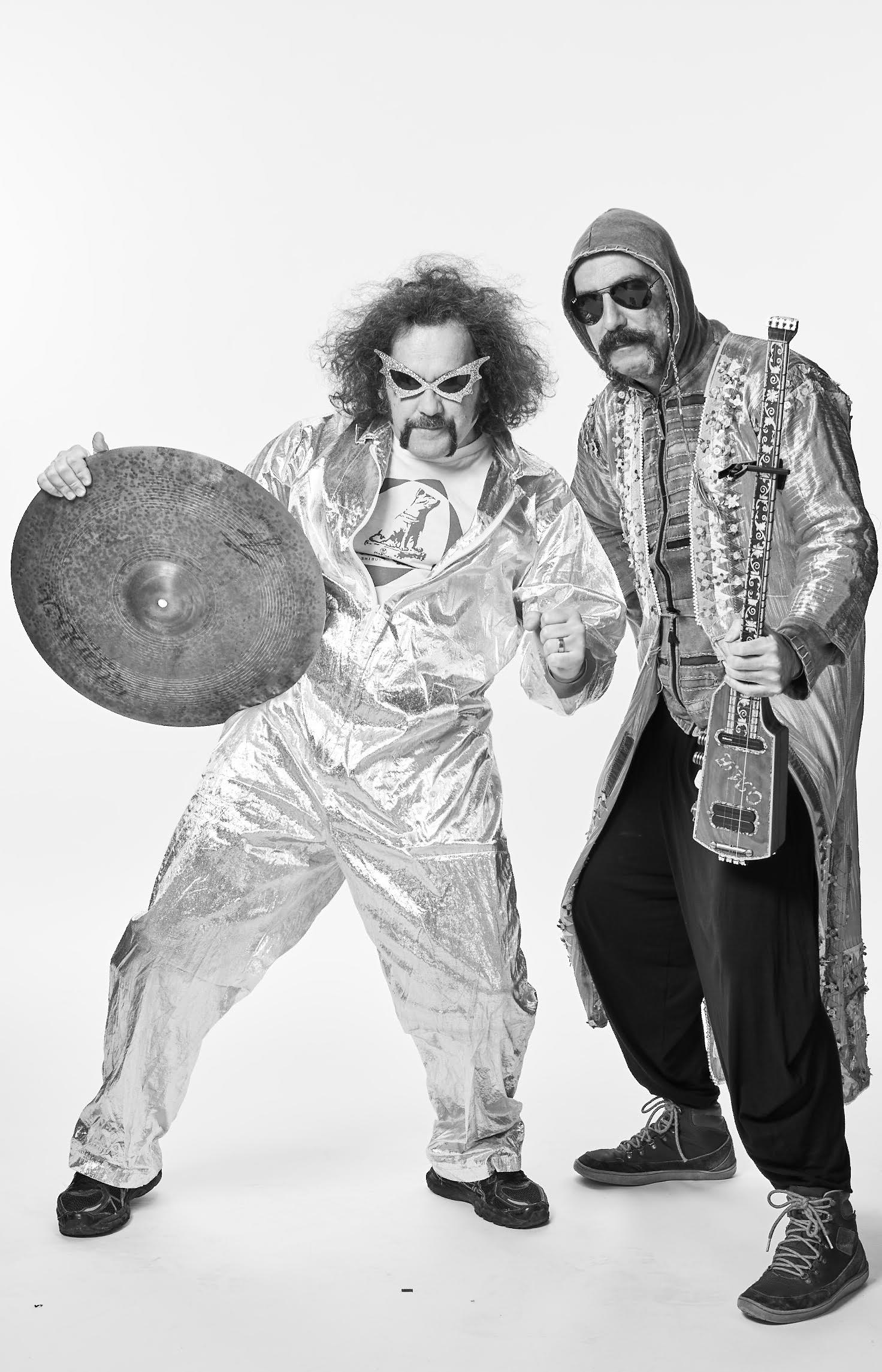

Background information
- Origin: Istanbul, Turkey
- Genres: Psychedelic, experimental, avant-garde, reggae, dub, world fusion, psychedelic folk, electronica, rock
- Years active: 1996–present
- Members: Murat Ertel; Mehmet Levent Akman; Esma Ertel; Ümit Adakale
- Past members: Emre Onel; Ceren Oykut; Çoşar Kamçı; Periklis Tsoukalas; Özgür Çakırlar; Melike Şahin
- Website: www.babazula.com

Baba Zula (also stylized as BaBa ZuLa) is a Turkish alternative musical group, founded in Istanbul in 1996. With a wide variety of influences and a wide range of instruments, they create a unique psychedelic sound.

== History ==
Founded in 1996, the band features Levent Akman and Osman Murat Ertel till today. Latest incarnation added Periklis Tsoukalas, Melike Şahin and Özgür Çakırlar. The other founder member Emre Onel was replaced by Coşar Kamçı in 2005. He was replaced by Özgür Çakırlar in 2012. BaBa ZuLa added live drawing artist Ceren Oykut into the mix in 2004. She left the band in 2010. Her presence onstage had added an important visual aspect to BaBa ZuLa's live performances. Akman, Ertel, and Onel originally formed BaBa ZuLa as a side project of now disbanded psychedelic Anatolian rock group ZeN.

The group started performing internationally at the Kumanova Jazz Festival in 2003 and gradually started building an international audience as well as a cult following in Turkey.

In 2005 BaBa ZuLa was exposed to a wider international audience when they were featured in a documentary, Crossing the Bridge by Fatih Akin, which took an in-depth look at Istanbul's contemporary and avant-garde music scene.

== Musical style ==
Described as "Turkey’s most beloved alternative music purveyors," Baba Zula create a unique psychedelic sound, combining traditional Turkish instruments, electronica, reggae, and dub. The core of their sound is the saz, a Turkish bouzouki-like stringed instrument with a bright, high-pitched sound. They use a revolutionary approach to electric saz, combining it both with retro and high-end electronic effects that creates an original sound never heard before until now.

BaBa ZuLa have performed at festivals such as The Spirit of Tengri (Almaty, Kazakhstan), Images of Middle East (multi-city Denmark tour), Roskilde Festival (Denmark), Sofia Film Festival (Bulgaria), Klinkende Munt Festival (Belgium), Printemps de Bourges (France), Cologne Triennale (Germany), Şimdi/Now Festival (Germany), Arezzo Wave Festival (Italy), the Venice Biennial (Italy), the Boost Festival (Netherlands), the Festival Islâmico (Mértola, Portugal) and the Era Nowe Horyzonty (Wrocław, Poland).

== Members ==
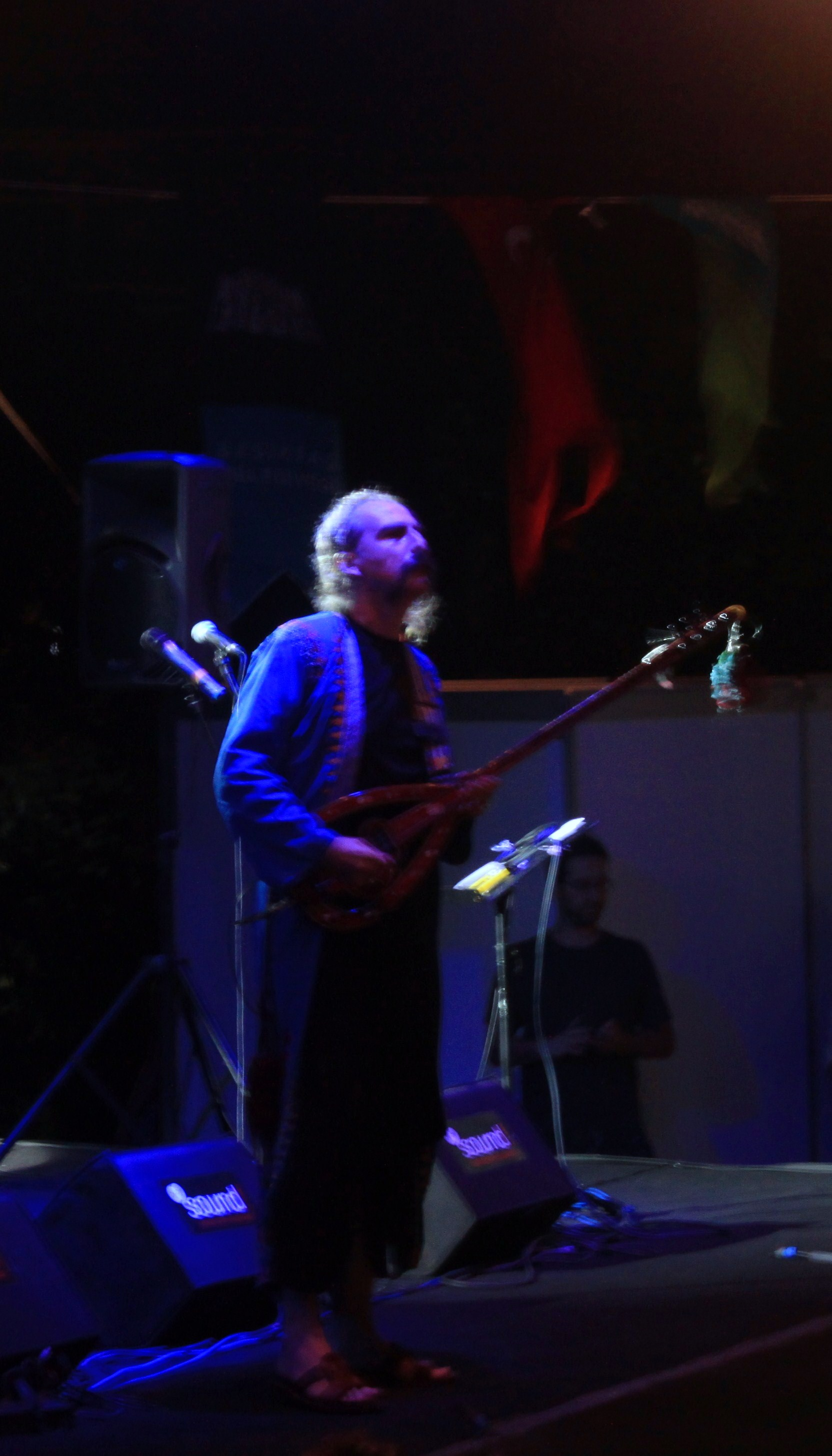
Murat Ertel performing with his electric bağlama

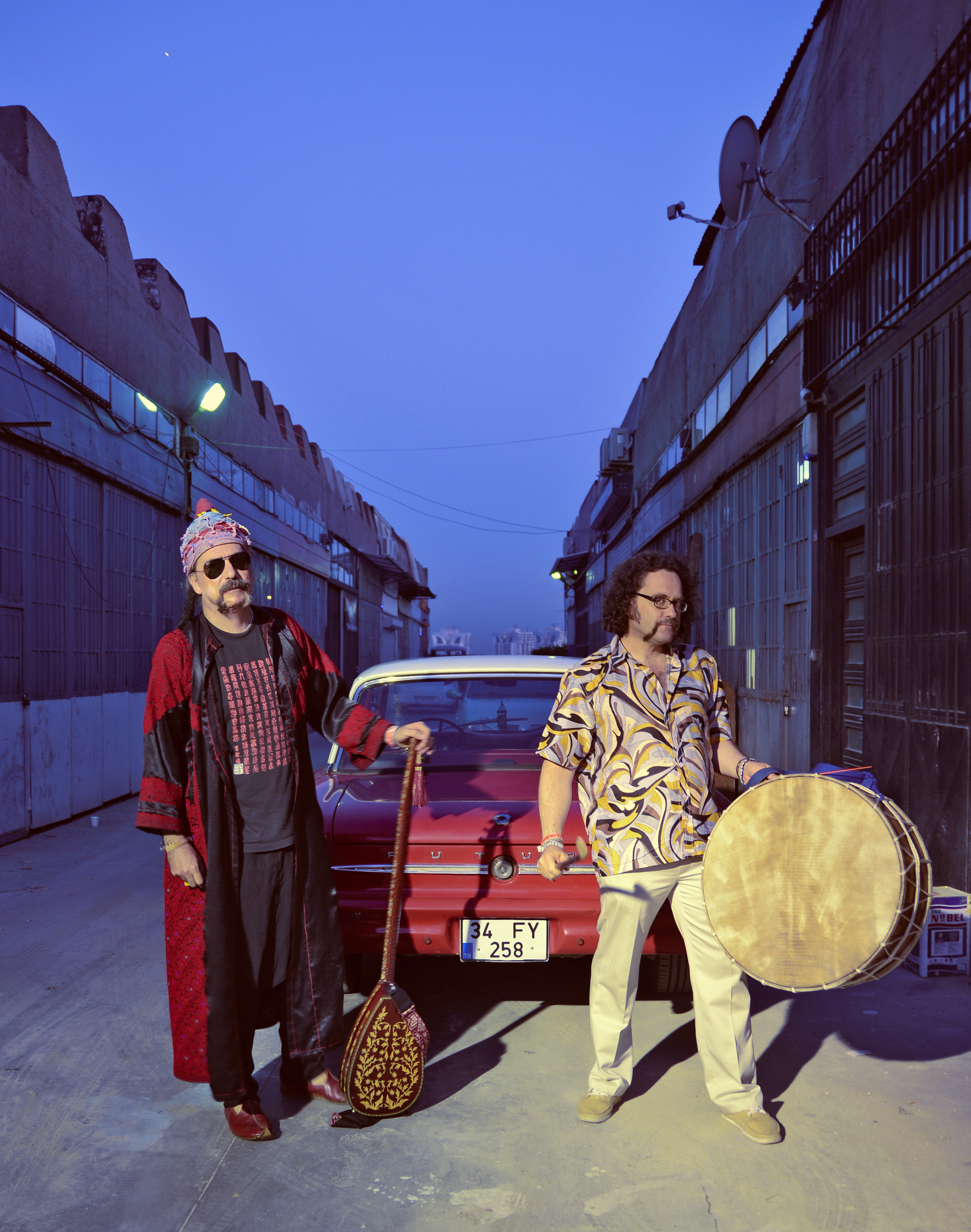
BaBa ZuLa – 34 Oto Sanayi

- Murat Ertel – lead vocals, electric saz, guitar, theremin, percussion, vox (1996- )
- Levent Akman – percussion, drum, machines vocals, gong, spoons (1996– )
- Esma Ertel - vokal, dans
- Ümit Adakale - darbuka, davul, bendir, perküsyon

=== Former members ===
- Melike Şahin – vox (2012–2018)
- Emre Onel – goblet drum, sampler (1996–2003)
- Ceren Oykut – live video (2004–2010)
- Çoşar Kamçı – goblet drum (2003–2012)
- Periklis Tsoukalas – electric oud, vocals, synth (2014–2022)
- Özgür Çakırlar – darbuka, bendir, davul, percussion (2012–2017)

== Guest musicians ==
International guests:

- Sly Dunbar and Robbie Shakespeare
- Alexander Hacke, bass guitarist from Einstürzende Neubauten
- Brenna MacCrimmon, Canadian Turkish-Balkan folk musician and vocalist
- Dr.Das (Asian Dub Foundation), English band that plays a mix of rapcore, dub, and ragga
- Titi Robin, French composer and improviser
- Tod A., bass guitarist
- Bugge Wesseltoft, Norwegian jazz musician, pianist, composer, and producer.

Turkish guests:

- Hüsnü Şenlendirici, clarinetist from Laço Tayfa
- Özkan Uğur, Turkish rock/pop musician from MFÖ
- Mehmet Güreli, Turkish writer-painter-musician
- Sumru Ağıryürüyen
- Selim Sesler, clarinetist

== Discography ==
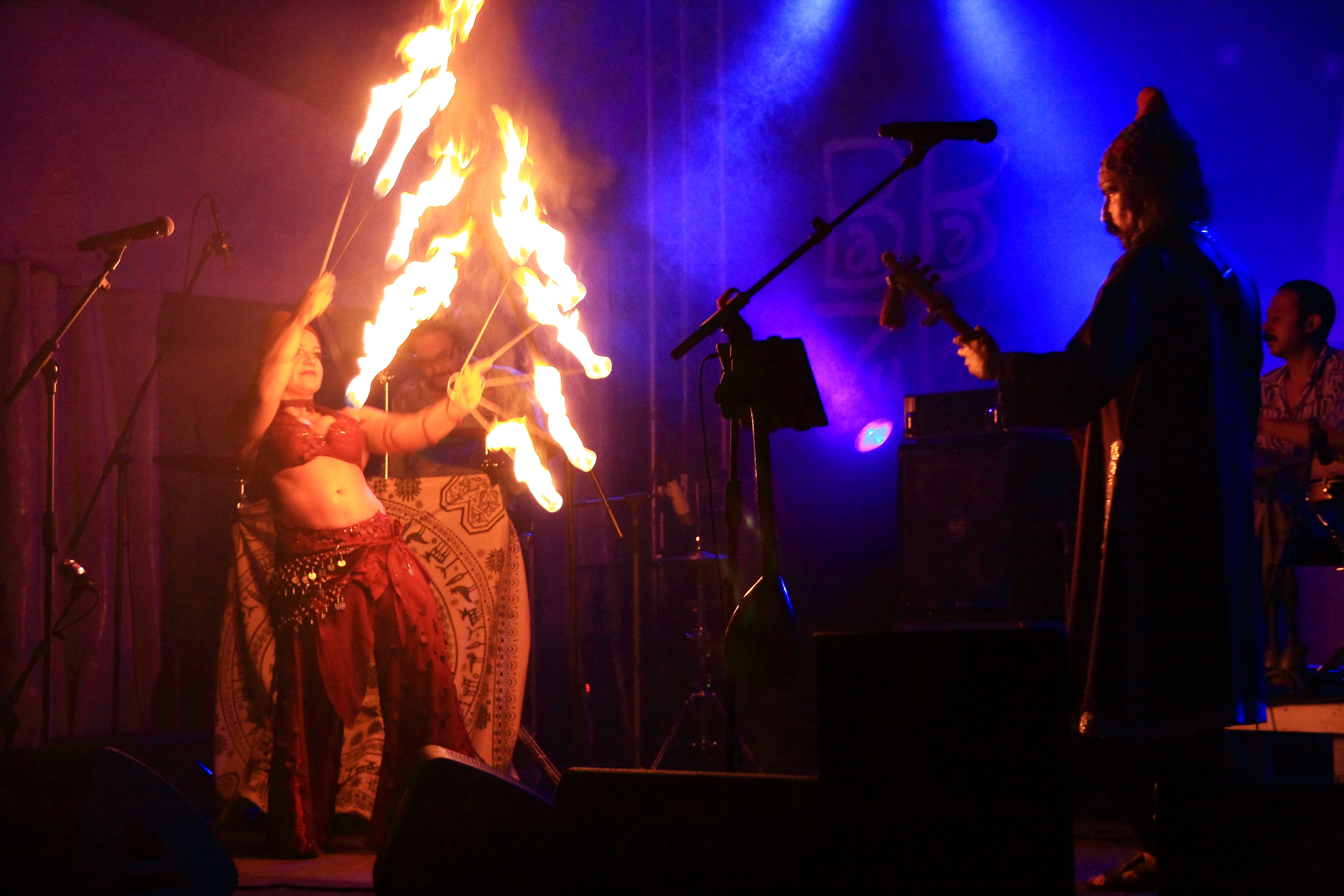
At TFF Rudolstadt 2012

- 1996 – Tabutta Rövaşata – soundtrack for Tabutta Rövaşata ("Somersault in the Coffin") by Derviş Zaim (Ada Music)
- 1999 – Üç Oyundan Onyedi Müzik (Doublemoon)
- 2003 – Psychebelly Dance Music (Ruhani Oyun Havaları)(Doublemoon, mixed by Mad Professor)
- 2005 – Duble Oryantal (Doublemoon, mixed by Mad Professor)
- 2006 – Dondurmam Gaymak – soundtrack for Dondurmam Gaymak ("Ice Cream, I Scream") by Yüksel Aksu (Rh Pozitif)
- 2007 – Kökler (Doublemoon)
- 2010 – Gecekondu (Doublemoon)
- 2014 – 34 Oto Sanayi
- 2017 – XX
- 2019 – Derin Derin
- 2020 - Hayvan Gibi - recorded live direct-to-disc at Artone Studios, the Netherlands in August 2019.
- 2024 - İstanbul Sokakları
