= Alabora =

Alabora is a Turkish surname. Notable people with the surname include:

- Derya Alabora (born 1959), Turkish actress
- Memet Ali Alabora (born 1977), Turkish actor
