= Mengü Ertel =

Turkish designer (1931–2000)

- Born: 1931; Istanbul, Turkey
- Died: March 15, 2000 (aged 68–69)
- Occupation: Graphic artist
- Children: Murat Ertel

Mengü Ertel (1931 – March 15, 2000) was a Turkish graphic artist, Ertel who graduated from the Istanbul Fine Arts Academy, became known for the decorations and posters he made for the theaters. The poster of the 1st Istanbul Festival was prepared by him. Ertel received the title of State Artist in 1998. He was also the presenter of the weekly TV show Cumhuriyete Kanat Gerenler until his death.

== Biography ==
Mengü Ertel had to make a living when he lost his father at the age of 12. His love for theater allowed him to meet Muhsin Ertuğrul in Küçük Theatre. In 1950, when Ertel started working with the decorator Kurt Halleger. He started his poster work in the 1960s, by making posters for private theaters of that period, he opened the first theater posters exhibition in 1969. He carried this exhibition to Berlin, Warsaw and Brussels. His works have been published in international graphic magazines, periodicals and annuals. His posters are in the collection of the Warsaw and Munich City Museums.
