= Parallel Trips =

- Directed by: Derviş Zaim; Panicos Chrysanthou
- Written by: Derviş Zaim; Panicos Chrysanthou
- Produced by: Derviş Zaim; Panicos Chrysanthou
- Cinematography: Feza Çaldıran; Andras Gero
- Edited by: Berke Baş; Hallosi Lazslo
- Music by: Mete Hatay
- Release date: 2004
- Running time: 120 minutes
- Country: Turkey

Parallel Trips (Turkish: Paralel Yolculuklar) is a 2004 Cypriot documentary film, written, produced and directed by Derviş Zaim and Panicos Chrysanthou, in which the two directors, from opposite sides of the divided island of Cyprus, record the human dramas that unfolded during the war of 1974 and the legacy that remains today. The film was screened at the Istanbul International Film Festival and the 12th London Turkish Film Festival.

== Festival Screenings ==
- Bodrum International Documentary Film Festival (2004)
- Istanbul International Film Festival (2004)
- 12th London Turkish Film Festival (2004)

== Reviews ==
Time Out London says that this "ambitious documentary, is a lengthy, slow-paced series of anecdotes narrated by those who experienced the horror of the troubles in Cyprus, both Turkish and Greek, which is, at times difficult to watch and poorly subtitled" also says that "by the end of (the film) which peace, community and the experience of war take on much deeper meanings, where, the good nature of the people recounting their stories makes the actions of the past all the more incomprehensible".

== See also ==
- 2004 in film
