= Mustafa Presheva =

Turkish film editor (born 1961)

- Born: 11 October 1961 (age 64); Mitrovica, Kosovo, Socialist Federal Republic of Yugoslavia
- Occupation: Film editor
- Years active: 1982–present

Mustafa Presheva (Turkish: Mustafa Preşeva; born 11 October 1961) is a Turkish film editor and actor of Albanian descent.

Presheva was born in Mitrovica, Kosovo, at the time in Yugoslavia. He studied film in Belgrade and since 1983 has worked mainly as a film editor.

In 1986 he received a Golden Medal for Best Editing at the Belgrade Short Film and Documentary Festival for the short film Dying Woods and in 1989 he was Editor of The Year at the Pula Film Festival for editing the feature The Fall Of Rock And Roll.

During the Yugoslav Wars, in 1992 he moved to Istanbul where he has been working since in Turkish cinema and has received numerous awards in the country. At the Antalya Golden Orange Film Festival in 1996 he received the Golden Orange Best Editing award for Tabutta Rövaşata, then Filler ve Çimen in 2001 and then Vicdan in 2008. As of 2008 he has won 6 awards and has edited over 25 films aside from making several appearances as an actor or aiding the directors.
