= Elephants and Grass =

2001 film by Derviş Zaim

- Elephants and Grass DVD Cover
- Directed by: Derviş Zaim
- Written by: Derviş Zaim
- Produced by: Ali Akdeniz; Fatoş Akdeniz; Bahadır Atay; Derviş Zaim
- Starring: Ali Sürmeli; Sanem Çelik; Bülent Kayabaş; Haluk Bilginer; Uğur Polat; Semir Aslanyürek; Ezel Akay
- Cinematography: Ertunç Şenkay
- Edited by: Mustafa Presheva
- Release date: 5 January 2001
- Running time: 115 minutes
- Country: Turkey
- Language: Turkish

Elephants and Grass (Turkish: Filler ve Çimen) is a 2001 Turkish drama film, written and directed by Derviş Zaim, about six different stories that merge into a common theme. The film, which went on nationwide general release across Turkey on 5 January 2001, won awards at film festivals in Antalya and Istanbul, including the Golden Orange Behlül Dal Jury Special Award.

== Cast ==
- Ali Sürmeli as Camoka
- Sanem Çelik as Marathon runner Havva Adem
- Bülent Kayabaş as Minister Aziz Bebek
- Haluk Bilginer as Sabit Üzücü
- Uğur Polat as Şeref
- Semir Aslanyürek as Russian Mob
- Ezel Akay as CIA Agent
