= Sanem Çelik =

Turkish actress, artist and dancer

- Born: 18 May 1975 (age 49); Istanbul, Turkey
- Occupation(s): Actress, artist, dancer
- Years active: 1985–present

Sanem Çelik (born 18 May 1975) is a Turkish actress, artist and dancer. Her series Aliye and Kara Melek has record-breakings Turkish Tv series.

== Filmography ==
=== TV series ===
- 1997-1999: Kara Melek (Uğur Erkır, Dilek Gökçin, Türkan Derya), Yasemin Saylan
- 2000: Kör Talih (Tamer İpek), Cayze Hatun
- 2002: Canım Kocacım (Erden Kıral, Hakan Gürtop), Banu Berke
- 2003: Günahım Neydi Allah'ım (Ümit Ünal), Semiha
- 2004-2006: Aliye (Kudret Sabancı), Aliye Adıvar (Karahan)
- 2008-2009: Güldünya (Ömür Atay), Gizem Özsoy
- 2013-2014: İnadına Yaşamak (Serdar Akar), Zeynep
- 2014 : Çocuklar Duymasın (Misafir), Ayten (Guest)
- 2016-2018, 2020-2021 : Eşkıya Dünyaya Hükümdar Olmaz (Ceylan Özsoy Çakırbeyli)
- 2018-2019: Bir Litre Gözyaşı - Figen

=== Films ===
- 1996: Yaban (Yakup Kadri Karaosmanoğlu romanı) (Nihat Durak), Emine
- 2000: Filler ve Çimen (Derviş Zaim), Havva Adem
- 2002: Sır Çocukları (Ümit Cin Güven, Aydın Sayman), Konuk Oyuncu
- 2005: Ayın Karanlık Yüzü (Biket İlhan), Meryem
- 2013: Behzat Ç. Ankara Yanıyor (Serdar Akar), Ulrike
- 2014: Balık (Derviş Zaim), Filiz Osmanoğlu

=== Documentary ===
- 2003: Hittites, Queen Puduhepa, Ekip Film

=== Voice-over ===
- 1999: Stuart Little, Mrs. Camille Stout, (Turkish)
- 2000: Chicken Run, Ginger, (Turkish)
- 2003: Red's Diary by Görkem Yeltan
- 2004: White The Lazy Worm by Görkem Yeltan
- 2006: Treasure Garden by Görkem Yeltan

=== Music ===
- 2001: "Album" by Toprak Sergen

=== Theatre ===
- 1999: Piano Sounds From Distance, Fiokla, Istanbul University State Conservatory
- 2000: Run For Your Wife, Mary Smith, by Ray Cooney, Dormen Theatre
- 2004: Run For Your Wife, Mary Smith, by Ray Cooney, Tiyatrokare

=== Musical ===
- 1985: Puppeteer, Children Musical by Muharrem Buhara, The Istanbul City Theatre
- 1998: Hommage To Çiğdem Talu, Musical, pianist Melih Kibar, Istanbul University State Conservatory

=== Ballet ===
- 1986: From Dream to Reality (J.Massenet)
- 1987: Swan Lake - Sleeping Beauty (P.İ.Tchaikovsky), Raymonda (A.Glazunov), For The Memory of an old Photograph (T.Khrennikov), 3.World Dance Day, Respect for Noverre (Bellini)
- 1988: Giselle (A.Adam), La Sylphide (H.Lovenskiold), North Winds (Sviridov), White Night (A.Luigini), Graduation Ball (J.Strauss)
- 1989: La Bayadere (L.Minkus)
- 1990: Adagio (Albinoni), Equinox (M.Theodorakis), Piaf Suit (E. Piaf), from 30's to 90's (Various Tangos), Dance of the Hours, Ballet Flute Piano (F.Chopin-A.Dvořák), Walpurgis Night/Faust (C.Gounod)
- 1991: Pas De Six (C.Pugni), Afternoon of a Faun (C.A.Debussy), Brankhos (Carreras-Domingo-Pavarotti), Towards Peace (Mahler), Caridas (Yanni)
- 1992: Romeo and Juliet Pas De Deux (Prokofiev), Le Corsaire Pas De Deux (Adolphe Adam), Ward, (Stravinsky), King's Cemetery B.C. (Hadjidakis), Slaves Chorus from Nabucco (Verdi)
- 1993: Requiem (A.L.Webber), Black Swan Solo (P.I.Tchaikovsky)
- 1994: Pas de Quatre (C.Pugni), Byzantine Pas De Deux (Anonym), Tchaikovsky in the Dream, (P.İ.Tchaikovsky)
- 2007: Danova Ballet School Assisting - Teaching
- 2012: "İstanbul" (Shaman Dance Theatre)

=== Pantomime ===
- 1988: "Vecihi Ofluoğlu and His Pupils"
- 1989: "Pink Panter with Orkestra", by Vecihi Ofluoğlu
- 1992: "25th Anniversary of Vecihi Ofluoğlu"

=== Modeling ===
- 1996: "Asena Exclusive" - "Alkış Butique" by Yaşar Saraçoğlu

=== Sports ===
- 2005: "Volkswagen Polo Ladies Cup Car Race", Doğuş Motorsports

== Awards ==
- 1996: 10th International Adana Golden Boll Film Festival Awards "Best Supporting Actress" Wild
- 1998: Entertainment Journalists' Guild Golden Objective Awards "Best Actress in a TV Series" Black Angel
- 2000: Lions Club International
- 2000: 37th Antalya Golden Orange Film Festival Awards "Best Actress" Elephants and Grass
- 2000: 8th Contemporary Screen Actors Guild, ÇASOD "Best Actress" Elephants and Grass
- 2001: 20th Istanbul International Golden Tulip Film Festival Awards "Best Actress" Elephants and Grass
- 2001: 8th Avşa Film Festival Awards "Best Actress" Elephants and Grass
- 2001: 12th Orhon Murat Arıburnu Awards "Best Actress" Elephants and Grass
- 2001: 23rd Screen Writers Guild Awards "Best Actress" Elephants and Grass
- 2004: Afife Theatre Awards "Nominated as a Supporting Actress in a Comedy" Run For Your Wife
- 2004: 32nd Golden Butterfly Television Stars Awards "Best Actress" Aliye
- 2005: Volkswagen Polo Ladies Cup, 3rd Place in the 1st Race, 5th Place in the general classification
- 2005: Beykent University Media Awards "Best Actress" Aliye
- 2005: 28th Radio Television Journalists' Association TV Oscars "Television Star" Aliye
- 2005: 1st White Pearl TV Awards "Best Actress in a TV Series" Aliye
- 2005: TDB Turkish Dental Association Special Award

=== Jury ===
- 2002: 13th Orhon Murat Arıburnu Film Festival
- 2013: 3rd International Crime and Punishment Film Festival
