= Mi Minör =

- Written by: Meltem Arikan
- Characters: The Pianist, The President
- Original language: Turkish
- Subject: democracy
- Setting: fictional country of Pinima

Premiere
- Date premiered: 1 December 2012
- Place premiered: Istanbul

Mi Minör is a Turkish play which premiered in 2012, said to be inspired by the Arab Spring. It is set in a fictional country, "Pinima", a country in which "despite being a democracy, everything is decided by the President," and the musical note Mi is banned. The play is significant for its integration of social media, with the audience encouraged to bring smart phones and follow an online version of the play carried out in real time alongside the stage production. Director Memet Ali Alabora described Pinima as "a sugar-coated democracy where everything is decided by the President. ...Everything is free in Pinima as long as the President approves." Mi Minör's digital versions operate on Twitter, Ustream, and via its own smart phone app.

During the June 2013 protests in Turkey (which director Alabora vocally supported and which depended on social media), the newspaper Yeni Şafak claimed on its front page that the play was a rehearsal for an attempt to topple the government.
