= Kara Melek =

- Also known as: The Dark Angel
- Written by: Nuran Devres
- Directed by: Uğur Erkır (Season 1) - Türkan Derya
- Starring: Sanem Çelik; Ece Uslu; Mustafa Alabora; Ziya Kürküt; Toprak Sergen; Aliye Uzunatağan; Zehra Alptürk; Sevtap Çapan; Memet Ali Alabora; Ahmet Uz; Yağmur Kaşifoğlu; Ebru Akel; Şenay Gürler; Kazım Akşar; Sedat Mert; Zerrin Arbaş; Emre Törün
- Country of origin: Turkey

Production
- Producer: Ertuğrul Karslıoğlu
- Running time: 45-60 min.

Original release
- Network: Star TV
- Release: 1997 – 2000

Kara Melek (The Dark Angel) is a TV series that was broadcast on Star TV and ran from 1997 to 2000. It was about a sly, clever and pretty woman called Yasemin (played by Sanem Çelik) as she tricked and schemed against her victims, and her innocent best friend Şule (played by Ece Uslu) who lives a complicated and hard life. Yasemin is the leading character and also the main villain, however, she can be kind and caring at times.
