= Meltem Arıkan =

Turkish novelist and playwright (born 1968)

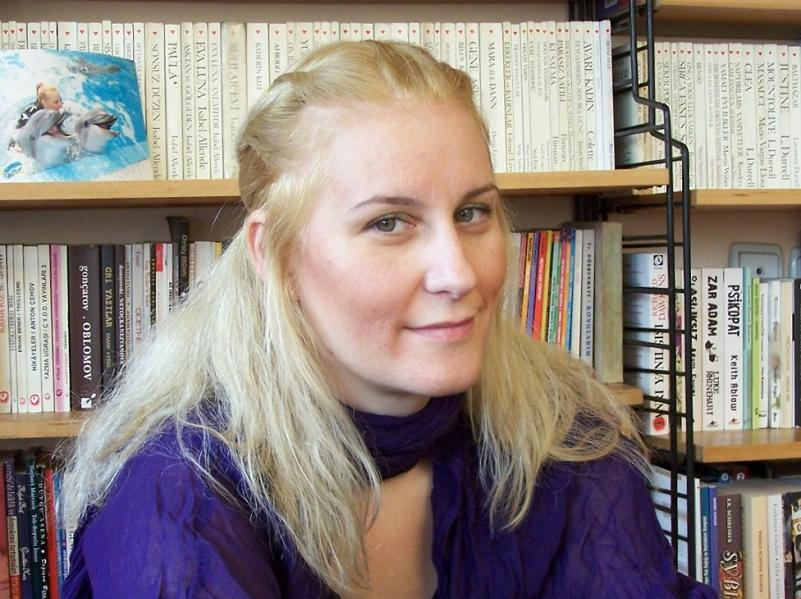
- Born: Handan Meltem Arıkan; January 7, 1968 (age 58); Ankara, Turkey
- Occupations: Novelist, Playwright
- Website: www.meltemarikan.com

Handan Meltem Arıkan (born January 7, 1968) is a Turkish novelist and playwright.

== Biography ==
Arıkan was born and grew up in Ankara, Turkey. Currently she is UK-based since she was persecuted by the Turkish government. The play Mi Minör is considered by the politicians a subversive work and the playwright is accused to be responsible for the rehearsal of Gezi Park protests. She allegedly received rape and death threats

Her first short stories and essays were published in various literary journals during 1992–1995. Her first novel, Ve… Veya… Belki… (And… Or… Maybe…) was published in 1999, followed by Evet... Ama... Sanki... (Yes… But… As If…) in 2000 and Kadin Bedenini Soyarsa (Undressing Herself) in 2002.

Her fourth novel Yeter Tenimi Acıtmayın (Stop Hurting My Flesh) which included women's trauma stories of child abuse, harassment and incest had been banned in early 2004 by the Committee to Protect the Minors from Obscene Publications, a body established under the Turkish Prime Ministry, with the accusation of "Writing about the non-existing incest fact in Turkey, while using Turkish names for the characters, attempting to disturb the Turkish family order with a feminist approach." Following the legal procedures, the ban was lifted by the '1st Magistrate Criminal Court' after two months, and the book was published once again without being subjected to any censorship. After this experience of censorship, Arıkan has been awarded with “Freedom of Idea and Statement Prize 2004” by the Turkish Publishers’ Association.

Her fifth novel Zaten Yoksunuz (You Exist In No Way) was published in 2005, followed by Umut Lanettir (Hope is a Curse) in 2006. After her first 6 novels, Arikan wrote the script for the play I’m Breaking the Game (Oyunu Bozuyorum) which premiered in August at the Zurich Theater Spectacle, performed by Garajistanbul and awarded the “New Unique Play” prize from VIII. Lions Theatrical Awards in 2007. She published a research book titled Beden Biliyor (The Body Knows) in 2008. In 2009 another play, Parallel, whose dramaturgy was by Arıkan, was staged by Garajistanbul as a part of the Linz 2009: European Capital of Culture program. Her last novel, Özlemin Beni Savuran (Your Yearning That Sways Me) was published in June 2009.

== Bibliography ==
=== Fiction ===
- 1999 Ve... Veya... Belki... (And... Or... Maybe...), 210 pp., 3rd edition 2005, ISBN 975-289-084-9
- 2000 Evet... Ama... Sanki... (Yes... But... As If...), 209 pp., 3rd edition 2004, ISBN 975-289-097-0
- 2002 Kadın Bedenini Soyarsa (Undressing Herself), 328 pp., 5th edition 2005, ISBN 975-289-007-5
- 2003 Yeter Tenimi Acıtmayın (Stop Hurting My Flesh), 327 pp., 6th edition 2007, ISBN 975-289-108-X
- 2005 Zaten Yoksunuz (You Exist In No Way), 278 pp., 4th edition 2005, ISBN 975-289-206-X
- 2006 Umut Lanettir (Hope is a Curse), 263 pp., 2nd edition 2006, ISBN 975-289-364-3
- 2009 Özlemin Beni Savuran (Your Yearning That Sways Me), 190 pp., ISBN 978-605-111-228-2
- 2015 Erospa, Akılçelen Publications
- 2018 Tek Bildikleri Aşktı, Eksik Parça Publications

=== Non-fiction ===
- 2008 Beden Biliyor (The Body Knows), 139 pp., 3rd edition 2008, ISBN 978-9944-2-9822-3

=== Theatrical plays ===
- 2007 I'm Breaking the Game (a.k.a. I'm Spoiling the Game) Text: Meltem Arıkan (Oyunu Bozuyorum)
- 2009 Parallel Dramaturgy: Meltem Arıkan
- 2012–2013 Mi Minör
- 2017 Enough is Enough, Wales

=== Journalism ===
- 2007 - columns at monthly magazine Kazete

== Awards and honours ==
- 2014, “Freedom of Expression in Arts Award” shortlisted by Index On Censorship
- 2013, Mi Minör, “Best Play of the Year” nomination at Lions Theatrical Awards
- 2012, Mi Minör, “Best Play of the Year” prize by Readers of Radikal Newspaper
- 2007 VIII. Lions Theatre Awards, Unique New Play Award (with Oyunu Bozuyorum - I'm Breaking the Game)
- 2004 Turkish Publishers Association's Freedom of Statement and Idea Award (with Yeter Tenimi Acıtmayın - Stop Hurting My Flesh)
- 2003 Nigde University Talebe Journal's Best Female Writer Award (with Kadın Bedenini Soyarsa - Undressing Herself)
