= Osman Alkaş =

Cypriot actor (born 1955)

- Born: 3 November 1955 (age 70); Nicosia, British Cyprus
- Occupation: Actor
- Years active: 1976–present

Osman Alkaş (born 3 November 1955) is a Turkish Cypriot actor. He is one of the founders of Nicosia Municipal Theater and he is still active in this theater. He was involved in the production of Torba, a popular program among the Turkish Cypriot people, and was featured in the film Gölgeler ve Suretler and the TV series Öyle Bir Geçer Zaman ki. He then acted in the films Uzun Hikaye, Hükümet Kadın 2, Sarmaşık, etc. He was particularly praised for his role in the film Sarmaşık.

== Early life ==
Osman Alkaş was born on 3 November 1955 in Nicosia to Turkish Cypriot parents. He completed his primary, secondary and high school education in Nicosia. After graduating from high school, he had discussions with his family about his career choice; but after facing oppositions from his mother, in 1973–74, he entered the Ankara State Conservatory Department of Acting. He graduated in 1976.

== Career ==
Alkaş returned to Cyprus in June 1976 and started to work as a contracted artist at the Turkish Cypriot State Theater. During this period, he went to serve in the military for two and a half years; but from time to time throughout his military service he took part in theater plays. In 1980 he was cast out of theater when he took part in a play by Fine Arts Association in Nicosia Culture and Art Festival. Then, on 3 November 1980, with the approval of the Municipal Council of the Nicosia Turkish Municipality, Alkaş, together with Yaşar Ersoy, Işın Cem and Erol Refikoğlu, founded the Nicosia Municipal Theater. He is still a member of this theater's staff.

Alkaş made various programs at Bayrak Radio. In his own words, Alkaş prepared "a long-term" children's program, as well as women's programs on the radio, alongside morning programs and cooking programs. During this period, he also made radio commercials. He started his television career together with Tolgay Tarıman. Alkaş and Tarıman made TV commercials for a while, before starting their program Torba in 1994. When the program became very popular among the Turkish Cypriot people, he established a TV channel with Tarım called "Tempo TV" in order to get rid of their ties to other channels. The program ended between 2003 and 2005.

In 2001, he worked as a screenwriter and played the role of Mustafa in an eight-episode series titled Gimme 6, which was shot in Cyprus by actors from Greece, Turkey and other countries. He later had a role in the movie Gölgeler ve Suretler, which was shot in 2010 and released the following year. He portrayed the character of "Veli" in the movie. In 2010, he was cast in the TV series Öyle Bir Geçer Zaman ki as Ekrem Tatlıoğlu. He also appeared in Yannis Yoannu's movie Hi! Am Erica alongside many other movies and short films. From January to June 2017, he acted in the TV series Bu Şehir Arkandan Gelecek as Rauf. Alkaş continues to appear in commercials. He also had a role in an adaptation of the opera Die Entführung aus dem Serail.

In addition to his acting career, he is also the Culture and Art Coordinator of the Nicosia Turkish Municipality. In 2009, he received the "Achievement and Peace Award" from the Satirigo Theater.

== Filmography ==
Film
| Year | Title | Role | Notes |
|---|---|---|---|
| 2010 | Gölgeler ve Suretler | Veli | |
| 2012 | Uzun Hikaye | Musa Çavuș | |
| 2013 | Block 12 | | |
| 2013 | Hükümet Kadın 2 | Veysi | |
| 2014 | Balık | | |
| 2015 | Ivy | Beybaba | |
| 2016 | Bir Baba Hindu | Behlül | |
| 2016 | Rüya | | |
| 2016 | Dar Elbise | Manager of Theater | |
| 2016 | Istanbul Story | Sinan Selimoğlu | |
| 2017 | Biz Size Döneriz | Ahmet | |
| 2017 | Dede Korkut Hikayeleri | Bayındır Han | |
| 2017 | Acı Tatlı Ekşi | Hakan | |
| 2018 | Ölümlü Dünya | Begüm's Father | |
| 2018 | Çocuklar Sana Emanet | Derviş | |
| 2019 | Hababam Sınıfı Yeniden | Lütfullah | |
| 2019 | Bağlılık Aslı | Fikret | |
| 2019 | Cinayet Süsü | Police Chief | |
| 2020 | Baba Parası | Selim's Stepfather | |
| 2021 | Anadolu Leoparı | Mayor | |
| 2023 | Hayat | Rıza's Grandfather | |
| 2024 | Romantik Hırsız | Chief Executive | |
| 2024 | Güneşi Söndürmem Gerek | | |
| 2024 | Mukadderat | Muharrem | |
| 2024 | Paranoya | | |
| 2024 | Yeniden Başlamak | | |
| 2025 | Confidente | Mr. Erden | |
Television
| 2010-2013 | Öyle Bir Geçer Zaman ki | Ekrem | |
| 2013 | Eski Hikaye | Sadri | Guest |
| 2014 | Kurt Seyit ve Şura | | Guest |
| 2015 | Bedel | Sami | |
| 2016-2017 | Hayat Şarkısı | Müfit Namıkoğlu | |
| 2017 | Bu Şehir Arkandan Gelecek | Rauf Anne | |
| 2018 | Gülizar | Veysel | |
| 2019-2020 | Vuslat | Tahsin Korkmazer | |
| 2020 | Alef | Osman | Guest |
| 2022 | Seni Kalbime Sakladım | Yusuf Abdullah Gören | |
| 2023-2024 | Yabani | Eşref Soysalan | |
| 2024 | Kalpazan | Orhan | |

== Personal life ==
Osman Alkaş had a close relationship with Deniz Çakır, a theater actor like himself. They were not married, but he had named Çakır as "my life partner". He lives in Cyprus. While filming Öyle Bir Geçer Zaman ki, traveled to Istanbul frequently and occasionally stays away from Cyprus for months. He owns three dogs.
