= Sabahat Akkiraz =

Turkish folk singer

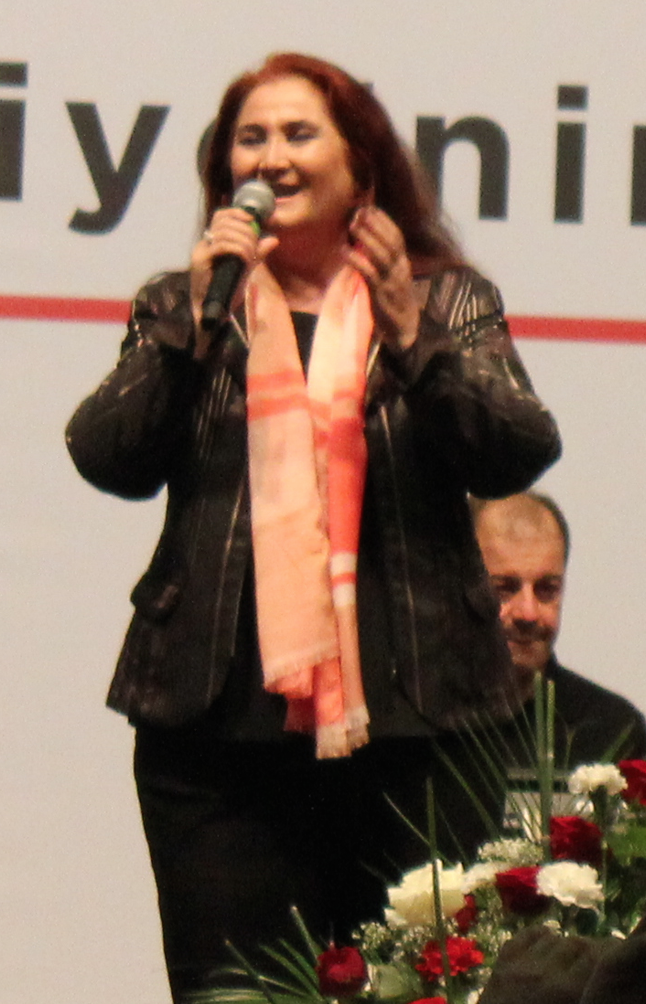

Member of the Grand National Assembly
- In office 12 June 2011 – 7 June 2015
- Constituency: İstanbul (III) (2011)

Personal details
- Born: Sabahat Akkiray; February 6, 1955 (age 71) Kangal, Sivas, Turkey
- Party: Republican People's Party (CHP)
- Occupation: Singer; artist; politician
- Musical career
- Genres: Turkish folk
- Years active: 1983–present
- Website: sabahatakkiraz.com

Sabahat Akkiray (born 6 February 1955 in Sivas), better known as Sabahat Akkiraz, is a Turkish folk singer and former politician, who was a Member of Parliament for Istanbul between 2011 and 2015 from the Republican People's Party (CHP).

== Biography ==
=== Music career ===
Born to a music-orientated family in Kangal, Sivas, Akkiraz and her family moved to Germany during her childhood. After returning to Turkey, she released her first professional album, Şafak Söktü, in 1983. Since then, she has worked with several other artists such as Arif Sağ, Musa Eroğlu, Muhlis Akarsu, Aşık Daimi, Feyzullah Çınar and Davut Sulari. Known internationally for her contribution to Turkish folk music, she has given concerts around the world and has worked with singers from different countries to help with their albums. Akkiraz has worked with London-based world jazz group Grand Union Orchestra, releasing an album, Echoes From Anatolia, and performing in their show Where The Rivers Meet at Sadler's Wells Theatre.

=== Political career ===
In the 2011 general election in Turkey, Akkiraz was elected as an MP from İstanbul's 3rd electoral district from the opposition CHP. Following the Soma mine disaster in 2014, Akkiraz announced her resignation from Parliament for the June 2015 general election, stating that having a parliamentary seat did not give her the ability to change the direction of the country. She proposed the joint resignation of all CHP MPs from Parliament as a protest against the governing Justice and Development Party (AKP) and the then-Prime Minister, Recep Tayyip Erdoğan.

== Discography ==
- Gül Yüzlü Sevdiğim (1982)
- Şafak Söktü (1983)
- İnsana Muhabet Duyalı (1984)
- Bir Gerçeğe Bel Bağladım (1985)
- Boş Yere Kavgayı Zahmet Biliriz (1986)
- Fazilet (1988)
- Deli Gönül - Bu Sene (1989)
- Bendeki Yaralar (1990)
- Yalan Dünya (1992)
- Dostların Anısına (1993)
- Dağlar Kardeşimi Geri Verin (1994)
- Yiğit İnsanların Türküleri (1996)
- Türkülerle Gide Gide (1997)
- Yüreğimin Sesi (1999)
- Deli Derviş (2000)
- Chante Alevite/ Alawite Singing - Long Distance (2001)
- Lamekan (2002)
- Konserler (2002)
- Kaygusuz (2003)
- Seyran (2006)
- Külliyat (2006) (with Orient Expressions)
- Türkü Hayattır (2007)
- Birlikte Türküler Söylüyoruz (2008) (with Mustafa Özarslan)
- Dillerdeki Türküler (2010)
- Yine mi Figan Var Dostların Anısına ... (2010)
- Seçmeler (2011)
- Turap (2014)

== See also ==
- Turkish folk music
- 24th Parliament of Turkey
- Music of Turkey
