= Mavi Sakal =

Turkish rock band

- Origin: Turkey
- Genres: Rock
- Years active: 1980–present
- Labels: Raks Müzik, Uzelli
- Members: Tibet Ağırtan (guitars, vocals); Murat Tümer (drums); Taylan Dedeoğlu (guitars); Batur Yurtsever (bass and keyboards)
- Past members: Genç Osman Yavaş (vocals); Kaan Altan (guitar); Andy Wand (bass); Kaan Uçak; Yasa Arar; Murad Ertel; Ilkut Uras; Ahmet Ersöz; Aytek Sermet; Emin Ersoy (bass); Cevdet Tosyalı (vocals); Ozan Akça (flute); Mahcem Öztürk (bass and vocals); Teoman Yakupoğlu (vocals); Tanju Eren (guitar, bass)
- Website: mavisakal.com

Mavi Sakal was a Turkish rock band, founded by Murat Tümer, Kaan Altan, and Tibet Ağırtan in 1980, who were students at the Tarsus American College in Tarsus, Turkey. The band changed their name to Mavi Sakal (literally, blue beard, or Bluebeard) in 1984, until then going by the name ECHO'83. In 1992, they established their first album "Çektir Git" and then in 1993, they published their second album "Mavi Sakal 2" after short period of time which their album published, their songs "Çektir Git" and "Şaşkın" made their place in the top lists. Due to this success, their producer published their second album in CD format. This album is also the first Rock album in CD format which is published by a Turkish rock band.

The band received increased public attention following their performance before Status Quo on the stage of Wembley Arena in Wembley, London in 1997.

After eight-year hiatus, they released their new album titled Naklen in 2015. The last seen-together members are either active in other formations such as bands FOMA and Karapaks, or as solo artists.

== Albums ==
- 1983 Giderken demo-album
- 1992 Çektir Git album
- 1993 Mavi Sakal 2 album
- 1997 İki Yol maxi single
- 1998 Kan Kokusu album
- 2006 SON..Kİ..5..10 maxi single
- 2007 Yeni...den album
- 2015 Naklen album
