= Panicos Chrysanthou =

Cypriot filmmaker and documentarian

- Born: 1951 (age 74–75); Kythrea, Cyprus
- Occupation: Filmmaker
- Years active: 1987–present

Panicos Chrysanthou (Greek: Πανίκος Χρυσάνθου; born 1951) is a Greek Cypriot filmmaker and documentarian.

== Biography ==
Panicos Chrysanthou was born in Kythrea in 1951. He graduated from the University of Athens with a joint degree in literature and philosophy.

Chrysanthou worked as an assistant director and executive producer in Greek and Cypriot films before making his own films. He received the prestigious Abdi İpekçi Peace Award in 1997 for his film Our Wall.

== Filmography ==
Film
Year	Title	Role			Notes
Year	Title	Director	Producer	Writer	Notes
1987	A Detail in Cyprus	Yes		Yes	
1993	Our Wall	Yes	Yes	Yes	Won the Abdi İpekçi Peace Award
1996	The Footprints of Aphrodite	Yes		Yes	
1997	Studio	Yes		Yes	
2002	Sylikou	Yes		Yes	
2002	Our Country	Yes		Yes	
2004	Parallel Trips (Turkish: Paralel Yolculuklar)	Yes	Yes	Yes	Documentary made with Derviş Zaim
2006	Akamas	Yes	Yes	Yes	Feature-length narrative film debut
