= Melike Şahin =

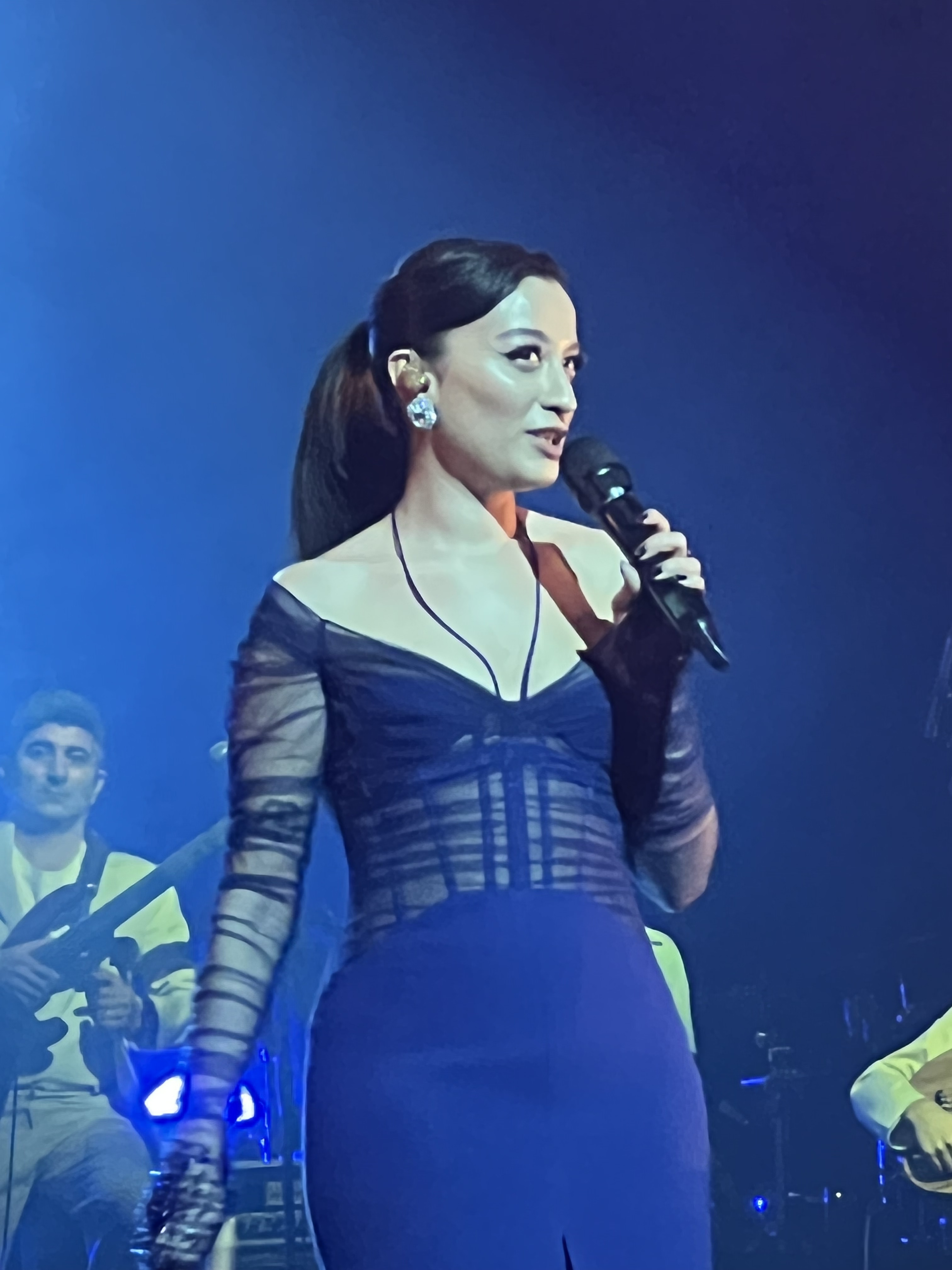
- Şahin on stage at Zorlu PSM, 2022

Background information
- Born: 18 April 1989 (age 37); Istanbul, Turkey
- Genres: Pop, arabesque, Turkish classical
- Occupation: Singer-songwriter
- Years active: 2011–present
- Labels: Sony (2017–2020); Gülbaba (2020–)
- Formerly of: Baba Zula

Melike Şahin (born 18 April 1989) is a Turkish singer-songwriter and composer.

== Life and career ==
Şahin, whose family is originally from Divriği, had a great interest in music since her childhood and took singing lessons from Timur Selçuk at the Contemporary Music Center while she was studying at Beşiktaş Atatürk Anatolian High School. After graduating from Boğaziçi University with a degree in sociology in 2012, she worked with Baba Zula as a vocalist until 2017. Shortly before she quit working with Baba Zula, she started a project called Melikşah ve Saz Arkadaşları, and gave concerts with an arabesque-themed repertoire at the Kanto tavern in Beyoğlu for a while.

In 2017, she voiced three songs for the soundtrack of Tony Gatlif's movie Djam and gave a concert at the Cannes Film Festival in the same year before the world premiere of the movie.

In 2017, she started her solo career with the singles "Bi' fırlatsam" and "Deli Kan". Her first solo album, Merhem, was released in February 2021. The album's first song, "Uykumun Boynunu Bükme", was released as a promotional single in January 2021.

== Discography ==
=== Albums ===
- Merhem (2021)
- Akkor (2024)

=== Live albums ===
- Merhem: İlk Konserler (2022)

=== Singles ===
- "Bi' fırlatsam" (2017)
- "Beni Yalnız Koma" (with Boom Pam, 2017)
- "Deli Kan" (2017)
- "Sevmek Suçsa Suçluyum" (2018)
- "Tutuşmuş Beraber" (2018)
- "Kimin Izdırabı" (2019)
- "Sakla Beni" (with Kutiman, 2019)
- "Kara Orman" (2019)
- "Geri Ver" (2020)
- "Kilitli Kapılar Açılsa" (with Hakan Taşıyan, 2020)
- "Elimi Tut" (with Kutiman, 2020)
- "Ukde" (with Ah! Kosmos, 2020)
- "Uykumun Boynunu Bükme" (2021)
- "Pusulam Rüzgar" (with Mert Demir) (2021)
- "Kader Diyemezsin" (Saygı Albümü: Bergen) (2022)
- "Miras" (with Ah! Kosmos, 2022)
- "Isyan" (with Ko Shin Moon, 2022)
- "Öpmek Lâzım (Baker Aaron Remix)" (2022)
- "Ellerin Hani?" (with Kutiman, 2023)
- "Pençe" (2023)
- "Diva Yorgun" (2023)
- "Sarıl Bana" (with Hey! Douglas, 2023)
- "Düldül" (with Mabel Matiz, 2023)
- "Durma Yürüsene" (2024)
- "Ortak" (2024)
- "Canın Beni Çekti" (2024)
- "Tükeniyor Ömrüm" (with Can Bonomo, 2025)
- "Beni Ancak" (2025)
- "Gönül (Live)" (2025)
