= Shadows and Faces =

2010 Turkish drama film

- Directed by: Derviş Zaim
- Written by: Derviş Zaim
- Produced by: Derviş Zaim; Sadık Ekinci; Emre Oskay
- Starring: Buğra Gülsoy; Settar Tanrıöğen; Cihan Tarıman; Osman Alkaş; Hazar Ergüçlü; Popi Avraam; Erol Refikoğlu
- Cinematography: Derviş Zaim; Emre Erkmen
- Edited by: Aylin Zoitiner
- Release dates: October 2010 (Antalya); March 11, 2011 (Turkey)
- Country: Turkey
- Language: Turkish

Shadows and Faces (Turkish: Gölgeler ve Suretler) is a 2010 Turkish drama film, written and directed by Turkish Cypriot director Derviş Zaim, which tells the story of a young girl who is separated from her father, a Karagöz shadow play master, during the beginning of the conflict between Turks and Greeks in Cyprus in 1963. The film, which saw a nationwide general release across Turkey on March 11, 2011, premiered in competition at the 47th International Antalya Golden Orange Film Festival, where it won the Turkish Film Critics Association Award. It is the third and final part of a trilogy of films themed around traditional Turkish arts, which includes Waiting for Heaven (2006) and Dot (2008).

== Cast ==
- Buğra Gülsoy as Ahmet
- Settar Tanrıöğen as Cevdet
- Cihan Tarıman as Rıza
- Osman Alkaş as Veli
- Popi Avraam as Anna
- Konstantin Gavriel as Hristo
- Ahmet Karabiber as Dimitri
- Erol Refikoğlu as Karagözcü Salih
- Ekrem Yücelten as Arif
- Hazar Ergüçlü as Ruhsar
- Pantelis Antonas as Greek Police Officer
- Derviş Zaim as Turkish Cypriot Commander

== Release ==
=== Festival screenings ===
- 47th Antalya "Golden Orange" International Film Festival (October 9–14, 2010)

== Reception ==
=== Awards ===
- 47th Antalya "Golden Orange" International Film Festival (October 14, 2010): Turkish Film Critics Association (SİYAD) Award
