= Akamas (film) =

- Directed by: Panicos Chrysanthou
- Written by: Panicos Chrysanthou
- Produced by: Panicos Chrysanthou; Derviş Zaim; András Gerõ
- Cinematography: Andras Goere
- Edited by: Thomas Kallis
- Music by: Michalis Christodoulides
- Distributed by: AmaFilms
- Release dates: 23 November 2006 (Greece); September 2006 (Italy); 9 October 2009 (Turkey)
- Running time: 124 minutes
- Country: Cyprus
- Languages: Greek; Turkish

Akamas (Greek: Ακάµας) is a 2006 Cypriot feature film directed by Panicos Chrysanthou about a love affair between a Turkish Cypriot and Greek Cypriot despite their families' opposition and the intercommunal violence of the 1960s.

== Summary of plot ==
The film takes place between the 1950s and 1970s. Turkish Cypriot Omer and Greek Cypriot Rhodou grow up together in Akamas. Rhodou initially falls in love with a Greek fighter but when he is killed she turns to Omer. Omer becomes an active member of EOKA. In spite of protests from her parents she decides to marry him. Omer and Rhodou escape from their families and friends and attempt a new life together, but this is Cyprus and a marriage between a Muslim man and a Christian woman is not something that local people are prepared to accept.

== Production ==
=== Inspirations ===
Although the main plot is archetypal, the subplot draws from the director's own life. Panicos' parents owned a coffee shop in Kythrea where he would hear many stories.

=== Location ===
Most of the film was filmed in the Akamas area. Akamas has many scenic views allowing for superb cinematography. Akamas is a symbol for the film; it is a peninsula.

=== Financing ===
Financing was made available by Turkey, Bulgaria and Cypriot government bodies (the individual production companies were Artimages Ltd, Cyprus - Marathon Filmcilik, Turkey - Creator C, Hungary).

== Screenings, reception and criticism ==
=== Akamas controversy ===
Many Cypriots living in Cyprus have not seen the film. This is largely due to the Cypriot government's actions, which effectively banned the film in Cyprus (but not in Europe). Although Chrysanthou, several other notable filmmakers and some politicians claim that the government's actions were politically motivated, the government claims that Chrysanthou was in breach of the filmmaking contract.

The government did not take direct action to stop the film production but it made it very difficult for its successful completion by withdrawing crucial funds and severely limiting its market potential by making distribution almost impossible and by banning it from Cypriot TV and Cypriot cinemas. The government was also reported to have attempted to censor a specific scene in the film by using its funding as a pressure for censoring. The Cypriot Commissioner of Administration, after researching the matter, concluded that the state attempted to censor Akamas without sufficient justification, thus violating the freedom of artistic expression. Nevertheless Akamas was completed and screened at several film festivals worldwide.

=== Positive reception ===
Akamas was the first Cypriot film to be screened at the Venice Film Festival. Akamas won the Los Angeles Greek Film Festival's Orpheus Award. At the Cypriot Film Festival UK the screening of Akamas was the most widely attended event. Simos Panayi, the founder of the Cypriot Film Festival UK, invited Panicos Chrysanthou to give a speech about Akamas and its historical context. The speech was primarily directed at younger British Cypriots, many of whom are born outside of Cyprus.

It was also screened at Thessaloniki Film Festival, The Festival Against Intolerance and Fanaticism, Los Angeles Greek Film Festival, and the New York Turkish Film Festival.

The film received positive statements and reviews from Boyd van Hoeij, Polycarpou, Joseph Proimakis, Alexander Andreou, Oliver Hilt, Ellen Angelopoulos and Simos Panayi. Simos Panayi, the founder of the Cypriot Film Festival UK, said that Akamas was the highlight of the event and invited Panicos Chrysanthou to give a speech about Akamas and its historical context. Boyd van Hoeij, a film critic on Rotten Tomatoes, says Akama's success lies in its ability to reunite the emotional and the political, the historical and the natural into a familiar cinematic story. Ellen Angelopoulos has suggested that it be re-edited after its festival circuit to accommodate more peaceful messages and be shown in schools as part of history lessons and broadcast on television.

=== Negative reception and response ===
Greek nationalists including ex EOKA B members labeled Panicos Chrysanthou a traitor to Cyprus, claiming that the film was funded with Turkish money and is therefore a Turkish propaganda film. Chrysanthou responded by saying "It belongs to Greek Cypriots and Turkish Cypriots, it belongs to peace and humanity." Derviş Zaim and Panicos Chrysanthou followed it up with this statement:

We call upon directors, people of the cinema, people from art and culture, all those who believe in democratic principles and the freedom of expression, to come forth and support AKAMAS in the struggle against censorship and the attempt to curtail our freedom of expression.

One scene of the film portrayed the execution of a Greek Cypriot, inside a church, by a Greek Cypriot, which resulted in the government of the Republic of Cyprus withdrawing funding promised to the filmmakers.

== Panicos Chrysanthou ==
Panicos Chrysanthou is a director who focuses primarily on documentaries. Akamas was his first fictional feature film. Films that he has worked on have been shown at Venice, Cannes and Berlin. Çamur (Mud) won a prize at the Cannes Film Festival. Panicos Chrysanthou was born in Kythrea.
