= Mehmet Güreli =

Turkish writer, painter, and director

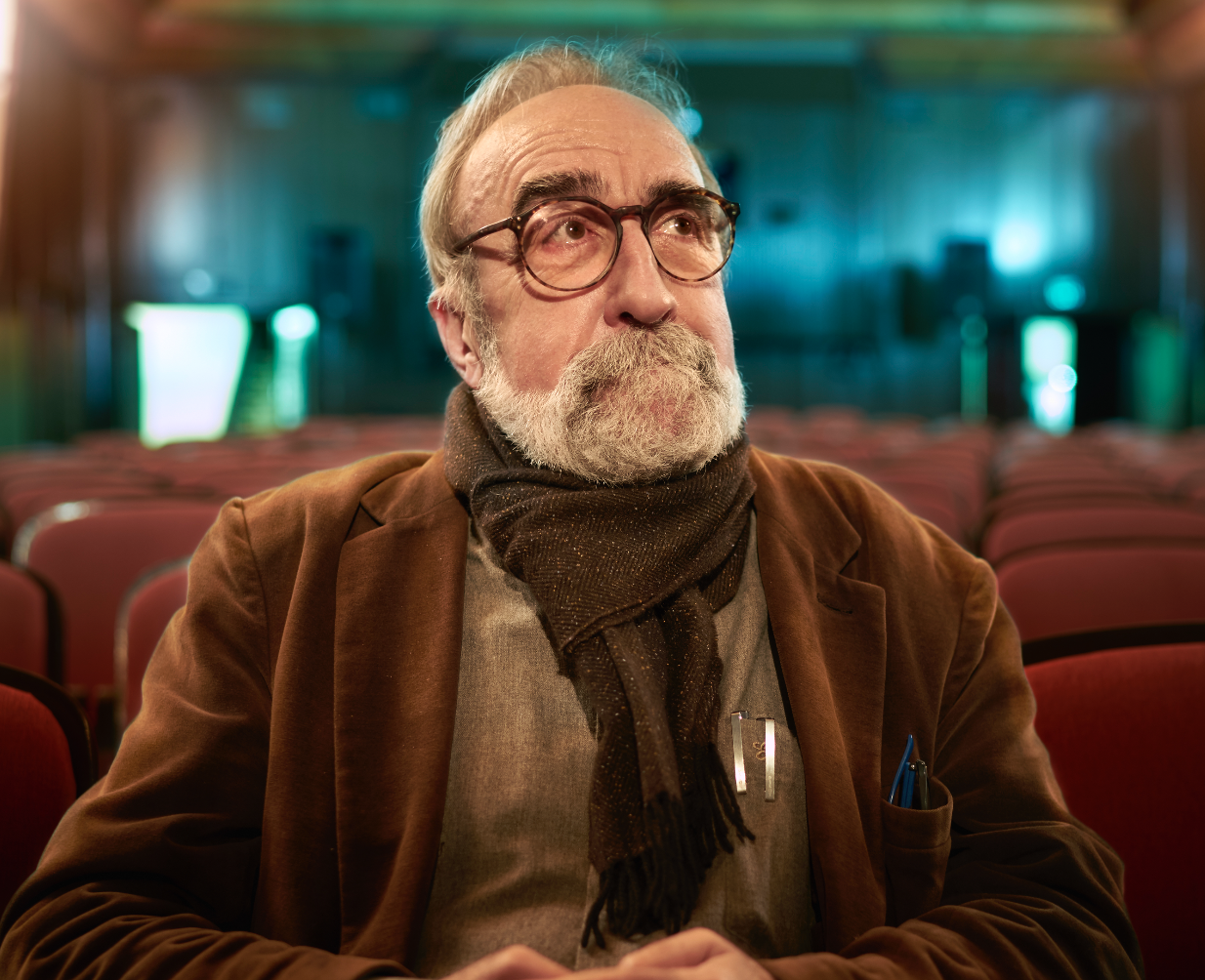
Mehmet Güreli

Mehmet Güreli (born 1949 in Istanbul) is a Turkish writer, painter, director and musician. He graduated from Istanbul University, majoring in philosophy. He started working for the Hürriyet newspaper in 1976. He is noted for his work across numerous art media.

== Albums ==
- 1988 - Vapurlar/Blues (Ferries/Blues)
- 1995 - Cihangir'de Bir Gece (A Night in Cihangir)
- 1999 - Yağmur (Rain)
- 2002 - Odamda Yolculuk (Voyage in my Room)
- 2007 - İplerin Kopuşu
- 2010 - Kimse Bilmez
- 2016 - Zamboni Sokağı
- 2019 - Oda Müziği - 1
- 2020 - Koş Git Bir de Sen Bak
- 2021 - Mehmet Güreli ile Buluşmalar

== Books ==
- 1985 - Sıcak Bir Göz (A Warm Eye)
- 1993 - Alope'nin Odası (Alope's Room)
- 2009 - Hayaller Ve Sokaklar
- 2015 - Bedrufi'nin Nefesi

== Movies ==
- 1986 - Vapurlar (Ferries)
- 2003 - A Documentary on Necdet Mahfi Ayral
- 2006 - İstanbul'a Yolculuk - Dünya Yazarlarının Gözüyle (A Voyage to İstanbul - From the Eyes of International Authors): A Documentary
- 2008 - Gölge (Shadow)
