= Somersault in a Coffin =

- DVD Cover
- Directed by: Derviş Zaim
- Written by: Dervis Zaim
- Produced by: Ezel Akay; Dervis Zaim
- Starring: Ahmet Uğurlu; Tuncel Kurtiz; Aysen Aydemir
- Cinematography: Mustafa Kuscu
- Edited by: Ugur Ozyilmazel; Mustafa Presheva; Murat Senyuz
- Music by: Baba Zula
- Production company: Istisnai Filmler ve Reklamlar (IFR)
- Release date: November 15, 1996
- Running time: 106 minutes
- Country: Turkey
- Language: Turkish

Somersault in a Coffin (Turkish: Tabutta Rövaşata) is a 1996 Turkish film, written and directed by Derviş Zaim, about a homeless criminal and car thief. The film, which was released on November 15, 1996, received awards at several international film festivals including the Golden Orange for best film at the Antalya International Film Festival.

== Cast ==
- Ahmet Uğurlu as Mahsun
- Tuncel Kurtiz as Reis
- Aysen Aydemir as Girl
- Mahmut Benek
- Ahmet Cediladirci
- Barış Celiloğlu
