= Ice Cream, I Scream =

- Directed by: Yüksel Aksu
- Written by: Yüksel Aksu
- Produced by: Yüksel Aksu; Eyüp Boz; Tankut Kılınç
- Starring: Turan Özdemir
- Cinematography: Sedat Karadeniz
- Edited by: Yıldız Uysal; Figen Erdöş
- Music by: Baba Zula
- Production companies: Hermès Film; Makara Film
- Distributed by: Özen Film
- Release date: 24 November 2006 (Turkey)
- Running time: 105 minutes
- Country: Turkey
- Language: Turkish

Ice Cream, I Scream (Turkish: Dondurmam Gaymak) is a 2006 Turkish comedy film written and directed by Yüksel Aksu and starring Turan Özdemir, the film's sole professional actor; the rest being residents of Muğla, Turkey.

The film was Turkey's official submission for the Academy Award for Best Foreign Language Film at the 79th Academy Awards, but it was not nominated.

== Plot ==
Ali, who is ice cream salesman in Muğla, tries to survive in the face of fierce competition from the big ice cream brands. While trying to promote his ice cream, he tours the village with his brand new yellow ice cream motorbike. However the naughty boys of the town who are chasing him to have free ice cream, steal the motorbike while he is away. Still repaying the debts for the loan on his motorbike, Ali becomes furious and accuses the big ice cream brands of stealing the car in order to destroy him. He starts investigating the theft of his motorbike asking one by one to the sellers of the big brands, while all along the naughty boys are enjoying their free ice cream.

== Cast ==
- Turan Özdemir as Ali
- Nejat Altinsoy as Komunist Mustafa
- Mehmet Amca as Arif Dede
- Levent Aras as Coban
- Ayse Aslan as the mother
- Gulnihal Demir as Canfeda
- Arap Fevzi as Arap Fevzi
- Ulas Saribas as Kamil
- Recep Yener as Imam
- Metin Yildiz as Gasteci Metin
- Ali Sefik Tavil as Kamil Baba
- Ismet Can Suda as Tingoz Kerim

== Awards ==
After gaining a submission for the Academy Awards, Dondurmam Gaymak was chosen to be the opening movie at the Queens Film Festival, as well as winning two Queens Spirit awards including Best Comedy Director for Yüksel Aksu and Best Comedy Film. It won a Special Jury award at Istanbul International Film Festival, and won an Ankara Movie Awards for Special Jury Awards, People's Jury Awards and Best Actor (Turan Özdemir).

== See also ==
- Cinema of Turkey
- List of submissions to the 79th Academy Awards for Best Foreign Language Film
- List of Turkish submissions for the Academy Award for Best Foreign Language Film
