= Derviş Zaim =

Turkish Cypriot filmmaker and novelist (born 1964)

- Born: Derviş Zaimağaoğlu; 1964 (age 61–62); Famagusta, Cyprus
- Occupations: Filmmaker, novelist
- Years active: 1990–present

Derviş Zaim (born Derviş Zaimağaoğlu in 1964) is a Turkish Cypriot filmmaker and novelist, who has twice won the Golden Orange for Best Director for Elephants and Grass (2000) and Dot (2008); Golden Oranges for Best Film and Best Screenplay for Somersault in a Coffin (1996); and the Yunus Nadi literary prize for his debut novel Ares in Wonderland (1995).

== Biography ==
Derviş Zaim was educated at Famagusta Namık Kemal High School and graduated in Business Administration from Boğaziçi University in 1988. He attended a course in independent film production in London and made experimental video Hang the Camera (1991). He subsequently wrote, produced and directed numerous television programs starting with the documentary Rock around the Mosque (1993). He completed his master's degree in Cultural Studies at the University of Warwick in 1994. His first novel, Ares in Wonderland (1995), won the prestigious Yunus Nadi literary prize in Turkey.

Somersault in a Coffin (1996) was his debut as director and screenwriter, which won awards at film festivals in Antalya, Montpellier, San Francisco, Thessaloniki and Turin. He followed it with Elephants and Grass (2000), which won awards at film festivals in Antalya and Istanbul, and Mud (2003), which won the UNESCO Award at the Venice Film Festival.

He co-directed the documentary Parallel Trips (2004) with Panicos Chrysanthou, in which the two directors, from opposite sides of the divided island of Cyprus, recorded the human dramas that unfolded during the war of 1974 and the legacy that remains today. He later produced the Greek Cypriot director's fictional feature debut Akamas (2006) about a love affair between a Turkish Cypriot and Greek Cypriot.

He made a trilogy of films, themed around traditional Turkish arts, consisting of Waiting for Heaven (2006), which was nominated for the Golden Tulip at the Istanbul International Film Festival, Dot (2008), which won awards at film festivals in Antalya and Istanbul, and Shadows and Faces (2010), which won the Turkish Film Critics Association Award at the 47th International Antalya Golden Orange Film Festival.

He also teaches at Istanbul Bilgi University and Boğaziçi University.

== Filmography ==
Films, Television & Video
Year	Title	Credited as			Notes
Year	Title	Director	Producer	Writer	Notes
1991	Hang the Camera (Turkish: Kamerayı As)	Yes	Yes	Yes	Experimental video.
1993	Rock around the Mosque	Yes	Yes	Yes	Television Documentary.
1996	Somersault in a Coffin (Turkish: Tabutta Rövasata)	Yes		Yes	
2000	Elephants and Grass (Turkish: Filler ve Çimen)	Yes	Yes	Yes	
2003	Mud (Turkish: Çamur)	Yes	Yes	Yes	
2004	Parallel Trips (Turkish: Paralel Yolculuklar)	Yes	Yes	Yes	Documentary made with Panicos Chrysanthou.
2006	Waiting for Heaven (Turkish: Cenneti Beklerken)	Yes	Yes	Yes	
2006	Akamas		Yes		Fictional feature debut of director Panicos Chrysanthou.
2007	Dot (Turkish: Nokta)	Yes	Yes	Yes	
2010	Shadows and Faces (Turkish: Gölgeler ve Suretler)	Yes	Yes	Yes	
2012	Cycle (Turkish: Devir)	Yes	Yes	Yes	
2014	Fish (Turkish: Balık)	Yes	Yes	Yes	

Awards
Preceded by Aykut Tankuter-Artun Yeres	Golden Orange Award for Best Screenplay; 1996 for Tabutta Rövaşata	Succeeded by Barış Pirhasan
Preceded by Nuri Bilge Ceylan	Golden Orange Award for Best Director; 2000 for Filler ve Çimen	Succeeded by Zeki Demirkubuz
Preceded by Fatih Akın	Golden Orange Award for Best Director; 2008 for Nokta	Succeeded by Reha Erdem
