= List of Turkish films of 2010 =

A list of films produced by the Turkish film industry in Turkey in 2010.

== Highest-grossing films ==
Highest-grossing Turkish films of 2010
Rank	Title	Studio	Gross (TL)	Gross (US$)
1	Secret of the Sultan	Filmografi	4,000,000 TL	$274,344
2	Recep İvedik 3	Özen Film	28.710.632 TL	$16,165,099
3	Eyyvah Eyvah	UIP	21,723,367TL	$15,028,272
4	Yahşi Batı	UIP	20,856,555 TL	$13,565,059
5	Hunting Season	Warner Bros.	16,935,492 TL	$11,026,825
6	Çok Filim Hareketler Bunlar	Medyavizyon	9,498,739 TL	$6,322,637
7	Veda	Tiglon Film	8,256,873 TL	$5,435,324
8	Kutsal Damacana 2: İtmen	Özen Film	6,845,747 TL	$4,556,469
9	Ejder Kapanı	UIP	6,716,187 TL	$4,297,600
10	Romantik Komedi	Pinema	6,103,697 TL	$4,062,440

== Events ==
January
30 — New Turkish Cinema by Asuman Suner published.
February
16 — Honey (Turkish: Bal) directed by Semih Kaplanoğlu premiered at the 60th Berlin International Film Festival where it won the coveted Golden Bear award.
March
10 — The 21st Ankara International Film Festival opened with a gala at the Presidential Symphony Orchestra (CSO) Concert Hall.
19 — Loose Cannons (Italian: Mine Vaganti) directed by Turkish-Italian director Ferzan Özpetek had its Turkish premier at the Nakıp Ali Cinema Complex in Gaziantep.
23 — The 3rd Yeşilçam Awards ceremony gave top award to Nefes: Vatan Sağolsun.
30 — Büyük Oyun won the Golden Reel Award for Best Cinematography at the Tiburon International Film Festival in San Francisco.
April
1 — The 29th International Istanbul Film Festival opened with a gala at the Istanbul Lütfi Kırdar Convention and Exhibition CenterLütfi Kırdar Congress Exhibition Hall.
May
6 — The 13th Flying Broom International Women’s Film Festival opened in Ankara with a ceremony at the State Opera and Ballet Hall.
11 — Taner Birsel wins best actor prize the 5th Monaco Charity Film Festival.
September
21 — The 17th Adana "Golden Boll" International Film Festival officially opened with a screening of La Mujer sin Piano by Javier Rebollo at the city's municipal theater.

== Released films ==
=== January to June ===
Opening		Title	Director	Cast	Genre	Notes
J A N	1	Yahşi Batı	Ömer Faruk Sorak	Cem Yılmaz, Demet Evgar & Özkan Uğur	Comedy	
J A N	15	One Day in the Future	Bogachan Dündar	Hayrettin Karaoguz & Hande Subasi	Comedy	
J A N	15	Kaptan Feza	Ümit Ünal	Hakan Karahan & Ahmet Mümtaz Taylan	Action	
J A N	22	Dragon Trap	Uğur Yücel	Uğur Yücel & Kenan İmirzalıoğlu	Thriller	
J A N	22	Kutsal Damacana 2: İtmen	Korhan Bozkurt	Şafak Sezer & Mustafa Üstündağ	Comedy	
J A N	29	Ada: Zombilerin Düğünü	Murat Emir Eren & Talip Ertürk	Ozan Ayhan & Esra Ruşan	Horror	
F E B	5	Romantik Komedi	Ketche	Sedef Avcı, Sinem Kobal & Cemal Hünal	Comedy	
F E B	12	Recep İvedik 3	Togan Gökbakar	Şahan Gökbakar, Zeynep Çamcı & Emirhan Çelik	Comedy	
F E B	26	Deli Dumrul Kurtlar Kuşlar Aleminde	Oğuz Yalçın	Mustafa Üstündağ, Arzu Yanardağ & Sema Öztürk	Drama	
F E B	26	Eyvah Eyvah	Hakan Algül	Demet Akbag & Ata Demirer	Comedy	
F E B	26	Veda	Zülfü Livaneli	Sinan Tuzcu, Dolunay Soysert & Özge Özpirinçci	Drama	
M A R	5	Eşrefpaşalılar	Hüdaverdi Yavuz	Turgay Tanülkü, Sinan Albayrak & Ali Yaylı	Drama	
M A R	5	The Voice	Ümit Ünal	Mehmet Günsür, Selma Ergeç & Tayanç Ayaydın	Horror	
M A R	12	Lost Songs of Anatolia	Nezih Ünen		Documentary	
M A R	12	Ay Lav Yu	Sermiyan Midyat	Fadik Sevin Atasoy, Sermiyan Midyat & Steve Guttenberg	Comedy	
M A R	12	Yüreğine Sor	Yusuf Kurçenli	Tuba Büyüküstün, Şevval Sam & Ayla Algan	Drama	
M A R	19	Büşra	Alper Chaglar	Mine Kılıç, Tayanç Ayaydın & Çiğdem Batur	Drama	
M A R	19	Dersimiz: Atatürk	Hamdi Alkan	Halit Ergenç, Çetin Tekindor & Doğa Rutkay	Drama	
M A R	19	Black Dogs Barking	Mehmet Bahadır Er & Maryna Gorbach	Cemal Toktaş, Volga Sorgu & Erkan Can	Drama	
M A R	19	Men on the Bridge	Aslı Özge	Cemile İlker, Fikret Portakal & Murat Tokgöz	Drama	
M A R	26	Çok Berbat Hareketler Bunlar	Ozan Açıktan	Eser Yenenler, Ersin Korkut & Oğuzhan Koç	Comedy	
A P R	2	Herkes mi Aldatır?	Kamil Aydın	Ragıp Savaş, Mine Tugay & Metin Zakoğlu	Comedy	
A P R	2	Min Dît	Miraz Bezar	Senay Orak, Muhammed Al & Hakan Karsak	Drama	
A P R	9	Honey	Semih Kaplanoğlu	Erdal Beşikçioğlu	Drama	Golden Bear Award winner
A P R	9	Beş Şehir	Onur Ünlü	Bülent Emin Yarar, Şebnem Sönmez & Beste Bereket	Drama	
A P R	9	En Mutlu Olduğum Yer	Kağan Erturan	Ezgi Asaroğlu, Nihat Altınkaya & Sivga Erez	Comedy	
A P R	9	Rina	Şenol Sönmez	Paşhan Yılmazel, Eray Türk & Çağlar Çorumlu	Comedy	
A P R	9	Son İstasyon	Ogulcan Kirca	Levent Kırca, Başak Daşman & Korel Cezayirli	Drama	
A P R	16	Brought by the Sea	Nesli Çölgeçen	Onur Saylak, Deniz Boyner & Ahu Türkpençe	Drama	
A P R	16	Cosmos	Reha Erdem	Türkü Turan, Sermet Yeşil & Saygin Soysal	Drama	
A P R	23	Black and White	Ahmet Boyacıoğlu	Tuncel Kurtiz, Erkan Can & Tanel Birsel	Drama	
M A Y	7	Takiye	Ben Verbong	Erhan Emre, Rutkay Aziz & Ali Sürmeli	Drama	
M A Y	14	Selvi Boylum Al Yazmalım	Atıf Yılmaz	Türkan Şoray, Kadir İnanır & Ahmet Mekin	Drama	
M A Y	14	Demsala Dawi: Sewaxan	Kazim Öz		Documentary	
M A Y	21	Bahtı Kara	Theron Patterson	Reha Özcan, Kamer Çelenk & Yeşim Ceren Bozoğlu	Drama	
M A Y	28	Haze	Tayfun Pirselimoğlu	Ruhi Sarı, Nurcan Ülger & Mehmet Avcı	Drama	
J U N	4	Ev	Alper Özyurtlu & Caner Özyurtlu	Deniz Celiloğlu, Kerem Atabeyoğlu & Alpay Atalan	Drama	
J U N	18	Off Karadeniz	Nur Dolay	Melissa Papel, İrfan Delibaş & Nurhayat Boz	Comedy	

=== July to December ===
Opening		Title	Director	Cast	Genre	Notes
S E P	3	Adı Aşk Bu Eziyetin	Suat Oktay Şenocak	Ertuğrul Sağlam, Günay Güney & Rıza Sönmez	Drama	
S E P	10	Paramparça (2010 film)	Naci Çelik Berksoy	Ozan Çobanoğlu, Ezgi Sertel & Alpay Aksum	Drama	
S E P	17	A Step into the Darkness	Atıl İnaç	Suzan Genç, Selen Uçer & Serdal Genç	Drama	
S E P	24	3 Harfliler: Marid	Arkın Aktaç	Özgür Özberk, Gülseven Yılmaz & Taner Ertürkler	Horror	
O C T	1	Cehennem 3D	Biray Dalkıran	Ogün Kaptanoğlu, Tuğba Melis Türk & Pelin Ermiş	Horror	
O C T	1	Harbi Define	Hakkı Görgülü	Cengiz Küçükayvaz, Önder Açıkbaş & Kemal Kuruçay	Comedy	
O C T	1	How Are You?	Özlem Akovalıgil	Semahat Garuşanin, Mesut Akusta & Deniz Çakır	Drama	
O C T	1	The Crossing	Selim Demirdelen	Güven Kıraç, Sezin Aktbaşoğulları & Cengiz Bozkurt	Drama	
O C T	8	Aşkın İkinci Yarısı	Mehmet Aslantuğ	Mehmet Aslantuğ, Arzum Onan & Tarık Ünlüoğlu	Drama	
O C T	15	Ayla: Tek Beden İki Hayat	Su Turhan	Pegah Ferydoni, Mehdi Moinzadeh & Sesede Terziyan	Drama	
O C T	15	Majority	Seren Yüce	Bartu Küçükçağlayan, Settar Tanrıöğen & Esme Madra	Drama	
O C T	15	Mahpeyker: Kösem Sultan	Tarkan Özel	Selda Alkor, Başak Parlak & Damla Sönmez	Drama	
O C T	22	O Kul - Hayal Bile Etme	Adem Uğur	Sinan Bengier, Ümit Çırak & Ceren Karaoğlan	Drama	
O C T	29	Kubilay	Ahmet Akıncı	Arda Kural, Selahattin Taşdöğen & Ergül Coşkun	Drama	
O C T	29	Nene Hatun	Avni Kütükoğlu	Açelya Elmas, Barış Koçak & Mehmet Esen	Drama	
N O V	10	Five Minarets in New York	Mahsun Kırmızıgül	Mahsun Kırmızıgül, Haluk Bilginer & Mustafa Sandal	Action	
N O V	10	Pak Panter	Metin Aslan	Ufuk Özkan, Metin Zakoğlu & Doğa Rutkay	Comedy	
N O V	10	Vay Arkadaş	Kemal Uzun	Demet Evgar, Mete Horozoğlu & Fırat Tanış	Comedy	
N O V	19	Sleeping Princess	Çağan Irmak	Alican Yücesoy, Sevinç Erbulak & Ayşe Nil Şamlıoğlu	Comedy-drama	
N O V	26	Flying Angels	Fırat Gürsoy	Sinem Öztürk, Aydan Uysal & Aytaç Arman	Dance	
N O V	26	Joenjoy	Nur Akalın	Bülent Çolak, Meltem Özsavaş & Abdallah Mywinyi	Drama	
D E C	3	Hunting Season	Yavuz Turgul	Cem Yılmaz, Şener Şen & Çetin Tekindor	Drama	
D E C	3	Memlekette Demokrasi Var	Süleyman Nebioğlu	Şafak Sezer, Tamer Karadağlı & Müjdat Gezen	Comedy-drama	
D E C	17	Jackal	Erhan Kozan	İsmail Hacıoğlu, Erkan Can & Uğur Polat	Drama	
D E C	17	Çakallarla Dans	Murat Şeker	Şevket Çoruh, Cengiz Küçükayvaz & Sümer Tilmaç	Comedy	
D E C	17	Secret of the Sultan	Ömer Erbil	Şerif Sezer, Mark Dacascos & Zeynep Beşerler	Action	
D E C	17	Şenlikname: Bir Istanbul Masalı	İsmail Eren	Sümer Tilmaç, Ayfer Dönmez & Ahmet Mekin	Drama	
D E C	17	Other Angels	Emre Yalgın	Kanbolat Görkem Aslan, Özay Fecht & Ayta Sözeri	Drama	
D E C	31	Hayde Bre	Orhan Oğuz	Şevket Emrulla, Nilüfer Açıkalın & İlker İnanoğlu	Drama	
D E C	31	Memleket Meselesi	İsa Yıldız	Bora Akkaş, Füsun Demirel & Ahmet Uğurlu	Comedy	
D E C	31	Kukuriku: Kadın Krallığı	Serkan Ok	Ayşen Gruda, Cenk Gürpınar & Didem Erol	Comedy	

== See also ==
- 2010 in Turkey
