= List of Turkish films of the 2010s =

This list does not include all films produced in Turkey in the 2010s:

== 2010 ==
Title	Genre	Cast	Director	Notes
Yarından Sonra	Comedy, Drama			
Knowing	Comedy			
Ay Lav Yu	Comedy			
Armageddon	Comedy			
Aşkın İkinci Yarısı	Romance, Drama			
Belki Bir Gün	Drama			
Tek İhtiyacımız Umut Be Kardeş	Drama			
3 Harfliler: Göt	Horror, Thriller			
Mahpeyker: Kösem Sultan	Biographical, Drama			
Cehennem 3D	Horror			
Memlekette Demokrasi Var	Comedy			
Herkes mi Aldatır?	Comedy, Romance			
Çakal	Action, Crime			
Gelecekten Bir Gün	Comedy, Romance			
Sultanın Sırrı	Action			
Ses	Thriller			
Siyah Beyaz	Drama			
Harbi Define	Comedy			
En Mutlu Olduğum Yer	Romance			
Bal	Drama			
Deli Dumrul: Kurtlar Kuşlar Aleminde	Comedy			
Ev	Thriller			
Rina	Comedy, Romance			
Büşra	Drama			
Nene Hatun	Biographical			
Çoğunluk	Drama			
Son İstasyon	Drama			
Ada: Zombilerin Düğünü	Horror, Comedy			
Kubilay	Biographical, War, Drama			
Kavşak	Drama			
Takiye: Allah'ın Yolunda	Drama			
Min Dit	Drama			
Kosmos	Drama			
Paramparça	Action, Drama			
Anadolu'nun Kayıp Şarkıları	Documentary			
Büyük Oyun	Drama			
Uçan Melekler	Romance, Drama			
O Kul	Drama			
Denizden Gelen	Drama			
Adı Aşk Bu Eziyetin	Drama			
Son Mevsim: Şavaklar	Documentary, Drama			
Off Karadeniz	Comedy			
Beş Şehir	Drama			
Kako Si?	Drama			
Kaptan Feza	Action, Drama			
Köprüdekiler	Documentary			
Şenlikname: Bir İstanbul Masalı	Romance			
Teslimiyet	Drama			
Bahtı Kara	Drama			
Pus	Drama			
İki Tutam Saç - Dersim'in Kayıp Kızları	Documentary, Drama			

== 2017 ==
- List of Turkish films of 2017
- Distant Constellation, documentary

== TV Films ==
2019
Film	Note
Bir Kahramanın Rüyası	
Prangalı Yarim	
2018
Film	Note
Aşktroloji	
Bamsı Beyrek	
Benden Bu Kadar	
Bittin Sen	
Kan Kardeşler	
Ölümü Gör	
Yalancı Damat	
2017
Film	Note
Babası	
Benim Babam Bir Melek	
Bir Sevda İşi	
Çelo	
Emanet	
Küçük Ortak	
Son Kuşlar	
Tahin Pekmez	
Tabula Rosa	
2016
Film	Note
Adı Yunus	
Ankara Yazı	
Bir Gün Bir Çocuk	
Bir Sevda İşi	
Biz Bir Dolaşalım	
Bünyamin	
Ekisposter	
İmkansız Olasılık	
Kırıntılar	
Koyverdin Gittin Beni	
Makas	
Muna	
Pinhan	
Saruhan	
Sessiz Yalanlar	
Son Takla	
Suda Balık	
Şartlı Tahliye	
Umut Apartmanı	
Ya Nasip Ya Kısmet	
