= List of Turkish films of the 1980s =

A list of films produced in Turkey in the 1980s:

== 1980s ==
Title	Director	Cast	Genre	Notes
1980
Bereketli topraklar üzerinde	Erden Kiral	Yaman Okay, Erkan Yücel and Nur Sürer	Drama	
Banker Bilo	Ertem Eğilmez		Comedy	
Vazgeç Gönlüm	Osman F. Seden			
Durdurun Dünyayı	Osman F. Seden			
Beş parasız adam	Osman F. Seden			
Ben topraktan bir canım	Osman F. Seden			
Beddua	Osman F. Seden			
1981
Şaka yapma	Osman F. Seden			
Günah Defteri	Osman F. Seden			
Gırgıriye'de şenlik var	Kartal Tibet		Comedy	
Davaro	Kartal Tibet		Comedy	
Bir damla ateş	Osman F. Seden			
1982
At	Ali Özgentürk	Bektas Altinok, Ýlhami Bekir and Erol Demiröz	drama	
Yakılacak kadın	Osman F. Seden			
Sen de mi leyla	Osman F. Seden			
Kördüğüm	Osman F. Seden			
Islak Mendil	Osman F. Seden			
Hülyam	Osman F. Seden			
Görgüsüzler	Osman F. Seden			
Aşkların en güzeli	Osman F. Seden	Kadir İnanır, Banu Alkan	Drama, Romance	
Hasret sancısı	Osman F. Seden			
Dolap Beygiri	Atıf Yılmaz			
Çiçek Abbas	Sinan Çetin		Comedy, Romance, Drama	
Dünyayı Kurtaran Adam	Çetin Inanç	Cüneyt Arkın	Science Fiction	
Yol	Şerif Gören			Won the Palme d'Or at the 1982 Cannes Film Festival
1983
Şekerpare	Atıf Yılmaz		Comedy	
Şalvar Davası	Kartal Tibet		Comedy	
Kahir	Osman F. Seden	Hülya Avşar, Orhan Gencebay	Drama	
Haram	Osman F. Seden	Hülya Avşar, Fikret Hakan	Drama	
Gecelerin kadını	Osman F. Seden			
Futboliye	Osman F. Seden			
Duvar	Yılmaz Güney			Entered into the 1983 Cannes Film Festival
Hakkâri'de Bir Mevsim	Erden Kıral			Won the Silver Bear - Special Jury Prize at Berlin
Eine Saison in Hakkari	Erden Kiral	Genco Erkal, Erkan Yücel and Serif Sezer	Drama	
Badi	Zafer Par	Cengiz Sayhan, Tolga Sönmez, Orhan Çagman	Science fiction	Known as "The Turkish E.T."
1984
Yabancı	Osman F. Seden	Hülya Avşar, Kadir İnanır		
Ömrümün tek gecesi	Osman F. Seden	Hülya Avşar, Kenan Kalav	Drama	
Nefret	Osman F. Seden	Hülya Avşar, Fatma Girik	Drama	
Karanfilli Naciye	Osman F. Seden	Hülya Avşar	Romance	
Pehlivan	Zeki Ökten			Entered into the 35th Berlin International Film Festival
Namuslu	Ertem Eğilmez		Comedy	
1985
Züğürt Ağa	Nesli Çölgeçen		Comedy, Drama	
Çıplak Vatandaş	Başar Sabuncu		Comedy, Drama	
Aşık oldum	Ertem Eğilmez		Comedy	
Tele Kızlar	Osman F. Seden	Tarık Akan, Nuri Alço, Hülya Avşar	Drama	
Mine	Atıf Yılmaz			Entered into the 14th Moscow International Film Festival
1986
Deli Deli Küpeli	Kartal Tibet	Kemal Sunal, Melike Zobu and Yaman Okay	comedy, drama	
Akrep	Osman F. Seden	Ahu Tuğba, Tarık Tarcan, Öztürk Serengil, Nuri Alço	Adventure	
Milyarder			Comedy	
Değirmen	Atıf Yılmaz			
1987
Selamsız Bandosu	Nesli Çölgeçen		Comedy, Drama	
Muhsin Bey	Yavuz Tuğrul		Comedy, Drama	
Iron Earth, Copper Sky	Zülfü Livaneli			Screened at the 1987 Cannes Film Festival
Gece yolculugu	Ömer Kavur			Screened at the 1988 Cannes Film Festival
Anayurt Oteli	Ömer Kavur	Macit Koper, Sahika Tekand and Orhan Çagman	crime, drama	
1988
A ay	Reha Erdem		Drama	
Av Zamanı	Erden Kıral			Entered into the 38th Berlin International Film Festival
Zengin Mutfağı	Başar Sabuncu		Based on play	
Yer demir gök bakir	Zülfü Livaneli	Rutkay Aziz, Yavuzer Çetinkaya and Macide Tanir	Drama	
1989
Arabesk	Ertem Eğilmez		Musical, Comedy	
