= 17th International Adana Golden Boll Film Festival =

- Festival Poster
- Location: Adana, Turkey
- Awards: Golden Boll
- No. of films: 200+
- Festival date: September 20–26, 2010
- Website: http://www.altinkoza.org/eng/

Adana Film Festival
- 18th 16th

The International 17th Adana Golden Boll Film Festival was a film festival held in Adana, Turkey, which ran from September 20 to 26, 2010. Prizes totalling 575,000 Turkish Liras were awarded in three categories and more than 200 films were shown at nine different locations, including the Cinebonus, Airplex and Metropol cinemas, in the course of the festival, at which films promoting the ideals of democracy were shown and Greek Director Theo Angelopoulos was the guest of honor.

This edition of the International Adana Golden Boll Film Festival, which was founded in 1969 and is organised by the Adana Metropolitan Municipality and accredited by FIPRESCI, opened with a screening of La Mujer sin Piano by Javier Rebollo at the city's municipal theater on the evening of September 21 and included gala ball at Park Zirve on the evening of September 23, at which lifetime achievement awards were presented to actress Müjde Ar, a selection of whose films were screened, and film critic Atilla Dorsay. The festival closed with an awards ceremony presented by Oktay Kaynarca and Öykü Serter on the evening of September 25. Other celebrities present at the festival included Ümit Ünal, Yılmaz Köksal, Bulut Aras, Nuri Alço, Suzan Avcı, Rıza Sönmez, Sibel Can, Zuhal Olcay, Göksel and Erol Evgin.

Palestinian filmmakers, Nasri Hajjaj and Liana Badr were also present at the festival to chair a special program Palestine, Longing for Peace dedicated to films and documentaries portraying Middle Eastern issues and to take part in a panel entitled Making Movies in Palestine. The festival was originally scheduled for June 7 to 13, 2010 but was postponed, following the May 31, 2010 Gaza flotilla raid and a terrorist rocket attack on the Iskenderun Naval Base, with Adana Deputy Mayor Mustafa Tuncel announcing, We cannot have fun while people are crying. The Turkish Film Critics Association (SİYAD) protested the decision, saying that postponing the festival, resulted in the silencing of Palestinian filmmakers.

== Awards ==
- Grand Jury Best Picture: Honey (Turkish: Bal) directed by Semih Kaplanoğlu
- Grand Jury Yılmaz Güney Best Picture: Brought by the Sea (Turkish: Denizden Gelen) directed by Nesli Çölgeçen
- Best Director: Selim Demirdelen for The Crossing (Turkish: Kavşak) / Levent Semerci for Breath (Turkish: Nefes: Vatan Sağolsun)
- Best Actor: Tansu Biçer for Five Cities (Turkish: Beş Şehir)
- Best Actress: Nergis Öztürk for Envy (Turkish: Kıskanmak) / Sezin Akbaşoğulları for The Crossing (Turkish: Kavşak)
- Best Supporting Actor: Bülent Emin Yarar for Five Cities (Turkish: Beş Şehir)
- Best Supporting Actress: Beste Bereket for Five Cities (Turkish: Beş Şehir)
- Most Promising Newcomer (actor): Umut Kurt for The Crossing (Turkish: Kavşak)
- Most Promising Newcomer (actress): Suzan Genç for A Step into the Darkness (Turkish: Büyük Oyun)
- Special Jury Award (young actor/actress): Bora Altaş for Honey (Turkish: Bal)
- Best Screenplay: Onur Ünlü for Five Cities (Turkish: Beş Şehir)
- Best Music: Selim Demirden for The Crossing (Turkish: Kavşak)
- Audience Jury Best Picture: Breath (Turkish: Nefes: Vatan Sağolsun) directed by Levent Semerci
- Turkish Film Critics Association (SİYAD) Best Film Award: Honey (Turkish: Bal) directed by Semih Kaplanoğlu

== Programmes ==
=== National Feature-length Film Contest ===
Ten Turkish films made in the preceding year were selected from the forty that applied to compete in the festival's National Feature Film Competition.

==== Films in Competition ====
- Honey (Turkish: Bal) directed by Semih Kaplanoğlu
- Five Cities (Turkish: Beş Şehir) directed by Onur Ünlü
- A Step into the Darkness (Turkish: Büyük Oyun) directed by Atıl İnaç.
- Brought by the Sea (Turkish: Denizden Gelen) directed by Nesli Çölgeçen
- Eyvah Eyvah directed by Hakan Algül
- The Crossing (Turkish: Kavşak) directed by Selim Demirdelen
- Envy (Turkish: Kıskanmak) directed by Zeki Demirkubuz
- Breath (Turkish: Nefes: Vatan Sağolsun) directed by Levent Semerci
- There (Turkish: Orada) directed by Hakkı Kurtuluş and Melik Saraçoğlu.
- The Voice (Turkish: Ses) directed by Ümit Ünal

=== National Student Films Contest ===
Eight documentary films, seven experimental films, ten fictional films and eight animation films by undergraduate students studying at cinema and television departments of Turkey's communications and fine arts faculties were selected to compete in the festival's National Student Films Contest.

=== Mediterranean Countries Short-films Contest ===
Eleven documentary films, eight experimental films, twenty-eight fictional films and fourteen animation films were selected from the 368 films that applied to compete in the festival's Mediterranean Countries Short-films Contest.

== See also ==
- 2010 in film
- Turkish films of 2010
