= Ayla Arslancan =

Turkish actress (1936–2015)

- Born: 16 April 1936; Istanbul, Turkey
- Died: 29 March 2015 (aged 78); Istanbul, Turkey
- Occupation: Actress

Ayla Arslancan (16 April 1936 – 29 March 2015) was a Turkish actress, best known for her roles in Züğürt Ağa, Uçurtmayı Vurmasınlar, and Selamsız Bandosu.

Arslancan was born in Istanbul in 1936 and raised in Ankara, Turkey. She began acting on stage when she was 20 years old. She appeared in many plays, movies and television programs, including Üç İstanbul (1983), Ah Gardaşım (1991), Gümüş (2005), Acemi Cadı (2006), Fırtına (2006), Annem (2007), Kavşak (2010), Ayrılık (2010), Entelköy Efeköy'e Karşı (2011), Sihirli Annem (2012), Acayip Hikayeler (2012) and Romantik Komedi 2: Bekarlığa Veda (2013).

Ayla Arslancan died on 29 March 2015, aged 78, from lung cancer. She was interred at the Kozlu Cemetery in Istanbul.
