= A Step into the Darkness =

A Step into the Darkness may refer to:

- A Step into the Darkness (2009 film)
- A Step into the Darkness (1938 film)
