= Yavuz Turgul =

Turkish film director and screenwriter (born 1946)

- Born: April 5, 1946 (age 80); Istanbul, Turkey
- Occupations: Film Director, screenwriter
- Years active: 1976–present

Yavuz Turgul is a Turkish film director and screenwriter, known for classic films of Şener Şen.

== Early life and education ==
Yavuz Turgul graduated from the Istanbul University Institute of Journalism and worked as a journalist for six years for Ses magazine before he began to write scripts.

== Film career ==
Turgul achieved early success in the late 1970s and early 1980s with scripts for a series of popular comedy productions from producer-director Ertem Eğilmez and famous actor-director Kartal Tibet including Tosun Paşa (1976), Sultan (1978) and Hababam Sınıfı: Güle Güle (1981).

He went on to greater success in the 1980s by winning the Golden Orange for Best Screenplay for Çiçek Abbas (1982), directed by Sinan Çetin, making his directorial debut with Fahriye Abla (1984) and winning the Golden Orange for Best Screenplay a second time for Züğürt Ağa (1985), directed by Nesli Çölgeçen before cementing his success by winning Golden Oranges for Best Film and Best Screenplay as well as prizes at film festivals in Istanbul and San Sebastián for his second directorial effort Muhsin Bey (1987), which according to Rekin Teksoy, "is considered his most important film".

In the 1990s he continued with Aşk Filmlerinin Unutulmaz Yönetmeni (1990) and Gölge Oyunu (1992), for which he won Golden Oranges for 2nd Best Film and Best Screenplay, before achieving his greatest box office success to date with the popular Eşkiya (1996), which according to Rekin Teksoy, "brought in Turkish audiences back into their seats," and made him,"a pioneer of the box-office hits during this period," as well as the recipient of the Golden Dolphin at the Festróia - Tróia International Film Festival.

He returned following a long absence with Gönül Yarası (2005), which won the Queens Spirit Award, and wrote Kabadayı (2007), directed by Ömer Vargı, which was released the same year he received a Golden Orange Lifetime Achievement Award. His latest film Av Mevsimi was released on 3 December 2010.

== Awards ==
Turgul won the Golden Orange for Best Screenplay four times for Çiçek Abbas (1982), Züğürt Ağa (1985), Muhsin Bey (1987) and Gölge Oyunu (1992); Golden Oranges for Best Film for Muhsin Bey (1987) and 2nd Best Film for Gölge Oyunu (1992); and a Golden Orange Lifetime Achievement Award.

== Filmography ==
Films
Year	Title	Credited as			Notes
Year	Title	Director	Producer	Writer	Notes
1976	Tosun Paşa			Yes	
1978	Sultan			Yes	
1979	Erkek Güzeli Sefil Bilo			Yes	
1979	Banker Bilo			Yes	
1981	Davaro			Yes	
1981	Hababam Sınıfı: Güle Güle			Yes	
1982	Abbas in Flower (Turkish: Çiçek Abbas)			Yes	Won the Golden Orange for Best Screenplay.
1982	İffet			Yes	
1983	Aşk Kadını			Yes	
1983	Şekerpare			Yes	
1984	Fahriye Abla	Yes		Yes	
1985	Züğürt Ağa			Yes	Won the Golden Orange for Best Screenplay.
1987	Mr. Muhsin (Turkish: Muhsin Bey)	Yes		Yes	Won Golden Oranges for Best Film and Best Screenplay.
1990	The Unforgettable Director of Love Movies (Turkish: Aşk Filmlerinin Unutulmaz Yönetmeni)	Yes		Yes	
1993	The Shadow Play (Turkish: Gölge Oyunu)	Yes		Yes	Won Golden Oranges for Best Film and Best Screenplay.
1996	The Bandit (Turkish: Eşkıya)	Yes	Yes	Yes	
2005	Lovelorn (Turkish: Gönül Yarası)	Yes		Yes	
2007	For Love and Honor (Turkish: Kabadayı)			Yes	
2010	Hunting Season (Turkish: Av Mevsimi)	Yes			
2017	Crosroads (Turkish: Yol Ayrımı)	Yes		Yes	
2026	To love, to lose (Turkish: Ayrilik da Sevdaya Dahil)				Credited as 'creator'

Awards
Preceded by Tuncel Kurtiz-Nurettin Sezer	Golden Orange Award for Best Screenplay; 1982 for Çiçek Abbas	Succeeded by Fehmi Yaşar
Preceded by Muammer Özer	Golden Orange Award for Best Screenplay; 1986 for Züğürt Ağa; 1987 for Muhsin Bey	Succeeded by not awarded
Preceded by Macit Koper	Golden Orange Award for Best Screenplay; 1993 for Gölge Oyunu	Succeeded by Nuray Oğuz
