= İlker Kızmaz =

Turkish actor

- Born: 9 September 1975 (age 50); İzmir, Turkey
- Occupation: Actor
- Years active: 2002–present
- Spouse: Aslı Türkel (m. 2014)
- Children: 1
- Website: ilkerkizmaz.com

İlker Kızmaz (born 9 September 1975) is a Turkish actor.

== Early life ==
İlker Kızmaz was born and raised in İzmir. As he became interested in acting, he started appearing on stage in his hometown. He later graduated from Anadolu University School of Communication. In 2004, he moved to Istanbul and began his education in acting at the Ekol Drama Art House and later enrolled in Bahçeşehir University, where he took acting courses.

== Career ==
Kızmaz made his television debut in 2002 by appearing in minor roles in the TV series Aslı ile Kerem, Yeter Anne and Candan Öte. He also took part in several commercials during those years. Between 2008–2010, he portrayed the character of Nihat Önal on Kanal D drama series Aşk-ı Memnu. The series was both a national and international success and marked the breakthrough of his career.

In 2009, he made his cinematic debut with a role in the movie Nefes: Vatan Sağolsun, directed by Levent Semerci. The movie won various national awards.

In 2012, he had a leading role in the historical drama movie Çanakkale 1915, in which he portrayed Mustafa Kemal Atatürk. Then, He portrayed as Mustafa Kemal Atatürk in mini historical series "Ya İstiklal Ya Ölüm" for twice.

He played in "Kurt Kanunu" based on Kemal Tahir's novel alongside Pelin Akil. He played in "Yol Ayrımı" based on Kemal Tahir's novel alongside Engin Altan Düzyatan, Bensu Soral, Dolunay Soysert.

In 2014, he joined the cast of TRT 1 period series Yedi Güzel Adam based on life of famous poets, playing the role of Kenan. In the same year, he shared the leading role with Mete Horozoğlu, Ayça Bingöl and Ekin Koç on the period series Benim Adım Gültepe.

== Personal life ==
Kızmaz married Aslı Türkel, his costar from Nefes: Vatan Sağolsun, on 16 June 2014. Their daughter, Naz, was born in June 2016.

== Filmography ==
Television
Year	Title	Role	Notes
2002	Aslı ile Kerem		
2002	Yeter Anne		
2002	Sırlar Dünyası		
2004	Cennet Mahallesi		
2006	Fırtınalı Aşk		
2007	Duvar	İsa	
2008–2010	Aşk-ı Memnu	Nihat Önal	
2010	Güneydoğudan Öyküler Önce Vatan	Bülent	
2011	Sırat	Yusuf Sancaktar	
2012	Yol Ayrımı		
2012	Kurt Kanunu	Cevdet Enis	
2014	Benim Adım Gültepe	Halil	
2014–2015	Yedi Güzel Adam	Kenan Hoca	
2016	Tatlı İntikam	Barış Demir	
2016	Sevda Kuşun Kanadında	Tarık	
2016–2017	Umuda Kelepçe Vurulmaz	Emir Urgaz	
2017–2019	Payitaht Abdülhamid	Şehzade Mehmet Selim	
2020	Ya İstiklal Ya Ölüm	Mustafa Kemal Atatürk	
2020–2021	Uyanış: Büyük Selçuklu	Arslantaş	
2021	Yalancılar ve Mumları	Hasan	
2022–2023	Hayatımın Şansı	Alpay	
2023	Teşkilat	Gökhan Kargı / Horus	
2023–2024	Arak/Kara	Baykal Tekin	
2024	Kalpazan	Sinan	
Web series
Year	Title	Role	Notes
2021–2022	Etkileyici	Pamir Yıldırım	
2024	İlk ve Son		
Film
Year	Title	Role	Notes
2009	Nefes: Vatan Sağolsun	İlker Çavuş	
2010	Bilinmeyen Yaşın Yorgunu	Cengiz	
2012	Çanakkale 1915	Mustafa Kemal	
2012	Cennetten Kovulmak		
2012	Açlığa Doymak	Tahsin	
2013	Mahmut ile Meryem	Süleyman Paşa	
2016	Kaçma Birader	İlker	
2016	Saruhan	İşkodralı Sarı Selim	
2017	Elimiz Mahkum	Orhan	
2018	Kardeşim için Der'a	Ali	
2021	Elli Kelimelik Mektuplar	Celal Türkan	
2023	Seni Görüyorum		
2024	Barda 2	Doğan	
