= The Bandit (1996 film) =

1996 Turkish film

Eşkıya
- Movie poster for Eşkıya
- Directed by: Yavuz Turgul
- Written by: Yavuz Turgul
- Produced by: Mine Vargı
- Starring: Şener Şen; Uğur Yücel; Sermin Şen; Yeşim Salkım
- Cinematography: Uğur İçbak
- Edited by: Hakan Akol; Onur Tan
- Music by: Erkan Oğur; Aşkın Arsunan
- Production company: Filma-Cass
- Distributed by: Warner Bros. Turkey
- Release date: 29 November 1996
- Running time: 121 minutes
- Language: Turkish
- Box office: 2.4 million admissions (Turkey)

The Bandit (Turkish: Eşkıya) is a 1996 Turkish film written and directed by Yavuz Turgul and starring Şener Şen and Uğur Yücel.

According to the director the film, which is about a bandit who comes to Istanbul after serving a 35-year jail sentence, "blends fairy tale elements while carrying the notion of reality within a fictional story."

The film is highly popular in Turkey, where it drew in 2½ million viewers and in Germany where it won a Bogey Award. The film is exclusively regarded as the savior and the turning point of Turkish cinema which was desperately struggling against foreign films since the 1980s and having difficulty attracting domestic audiences.

It was Turkey's official entry for the Academy Award for Best Foreign Language Film at the 70th Academy Awards, but was not nominated.

== Plot ==
After serving a 35-year jail sentence, Baran (played by Şener Şen), an eşkıya (a bandit, a haydut in Turkish), is released from prison in Viranşehir, a town in Eastern Turkey. When returning to the home village he witnesses the fact that the world has changed dramatically during those years, with the village itself underwater after the construction of a dam. Then he also finds out that the person who masterminded the betrayal that brought him to jail was Berfo (Kamuran Usluer), a friend who had once been closer to him than a brother. To snare Keje (Sermin Şen), Baran's sweetheart, Berfo seized his best friend's gold and had Baran arrested by the gendarmes on Mountain Cudi. Then Berfo purchased Keje from her father against her will and disappeared. According to rumours, he had fled to Istanbul.

While travelling to Istanbul by train, Baran meets Cumali (Uğur Yücel), a young man. To avoid the plainclothes police officers stationed to apprehend him, and trusting the old man's lack of ill intent, Cumali passed off the contraband he carried to Baran, asking him to return it to him at a specified address. Baran later arrives just in time as Cumali is being reprimanded by his boss for his carelessness in abandoning a package.

Child of an abusive household, Cumali was raised in the alleys of Beyoğlu, his life revolving around dives, gambling parlours, alcohol, dope and women. He is a small-time grifter who dreams of moving up in the ranks and becoming a career criminal of high standing. He becomes a courier for a local mobster to release from confinement his lover Emel's (Yeşim Salkım) brother, Sedat (Özkan Uğur) and he begins to skim off the drugs entrusted to him and sell them off on the side.

Watching the television with his fellow tenants, Baran notices that his comrade-turned-betrayer Berfo has become a wealthy magnate, now named Mahmut Şahoğlu. Later, when Baran confronts Berfo by coming across the latter's motorcade, he is initially detained but is mysteriously released and brought to the mansion, seemingly on Berfo's orders. It's revealed that in the intervening years, Keje has taken a vow of silence as a protest for her forced marriage, which torments the now wheelchair-using Berfo, who asks Baran to make her speak for the first time in 35 years. Out of his own longing for her, Baran reveals to her that it was in the hopes of seeing her again that he survived for decades in his violent prison sentence, which makes Keje speak at last.

Cumali is informed that Sedat was not Emel's brother but her lover and that the pair absconded after the former's release. It's also revealed that Demircan is aware of the missing quantities in his drug transactions and is suspecting an insider. Cumali, with Baran in tow, tracks down Emel and Sedat, and despite Baran's urgings of restraint, kills them both. After an exchange of fire with the police and his banishment from his aunt's house, Cumali and his friends, who are implied to have informed Demircan of Cumali's dealings, are abducted and taken hostage in the mobster's mechanics shop. Baran intervenes on their behalf, promising to secure the missing funds on the agreement that the debt is his to pay and that Cumali is not to be harmed. He appeals to Keje, who then compels Berfo to write a cheque for the demanded amount. Promising Keje to return for her once his work is done, Baran departs.

It's revealed that Berfo had purposefully written a dishonoured cheque as a last act of spite, and in retaliation, Demircan has Cumali gunned down in broad daylight. A heavy-wounded Cumali crawls to the rooftop of his hotel, where he dies in Baran's arms. Enraged by the death of his surrogate son, Baran goes on a murderous rampage, starting with the abusive pimp of the ageing prostitute Sevim (Güven Hokna), then raiding Demircan's shop, gunning down his gang and executing the terrified mobster despite his desperate pleas. Baran later returns to Berfo's manor to confront him for his duplicity. The dying magnate, in indignant defiance, berates Baran for wasting Keje's hopes for a nobody like Cumali and justifies his betrayal of Baran on account of his desperate love for Keje, which compelled him to inform the gendarmerie on Baran, to steal his gold, to marry albeit forcibly, his betrothed. Berfo claims that he's unrepentant for his actions and is ready to burn in hell for the sins that he claims Baran is incapable of committing, after which Baran shoots him dead.

Now a wanted man, Baran evades capture for a few days but is ultimately cornered by the police. In the firefight, Baran loses his talisman, which he believes makes him impervious to bullets. Interpreting it as a sign of the end, he commits suicide by walking off the ledge. In Baran's village of birth, the village elder Ceren Ana gazes after a shooting star, signifying the passing of an eşkıya.

== Cast ==
- Şener Şen as Baran
- Uğur Yücel as Cumali
- Sermin Şen as Keje
- Yeşim Salkım as Emel
- Kamran Usluer as Berfo/Mahmut Şahoğlu
- Ülkü Duru as Emel's mother
- Özkan Uğur as Sedat
- Necdet Mahfi Ayral as Andref Miskin
- Kayhan Yıldızoğlu as Artist Kemal
- Güven Hokna as Sevim
- Kemal İnci as Mustafa
- Melih Çardak as Demircan
- Settar Tanrıöğen as Girl Naci
- Celal Perk as Deli Selim
- Ümit Çırak as Cimbom

== Reception ==
=== Reviews ===
Sandra Brennan, writing on Allmovie, describes it as a, "lightning-paced, romantic actioner," but ultimately gave the movie only two out of a possible five stars, whilst Rekin Teksoy, writing in Turkish Cinema, states, "Turgul's narrative imbued with sorrow weaves in elements of American action films and television clips," "pays great attention to detail," and, "relies on the tradition of legends found in eastern literature."

=== Awards ===
- 1997 Bogey Awards (Won)
- 1998 Festróia - Tróia International Film Festival Gold Dolphin: Yavuz Turgul (Won)

== See also ==
- List of submissions to the 70th Academy Awards for Best Foreign Language Film
- List of Turkish submissions for the Academy Award for Best Foreign Language Film
