= Envy (2009 film) =

- Envy Theatrical Poster
- Directed by: Zeki Demirkubuz
- Written by: Zeki Demirkubuz
- Based on: Kıskanmak by Nahit Sırrı Örik
- Produced by: Zeki Demirkubuz; Zafer Çelik
- Starring: Nergis Öztürk; Serhat Tutumluer; Berrak Tüzünataç; Bora Cengiz; Hatice Aslan
- Cinematography: Emre Erkmen
- Edited by: Zeki Demirkubuz
- Music by: Tamer Çıray
- Production companies: Yerli Film; Mavi Film
- Distributed by: Medyavizyon
- Release date: 6 November 2009
- Running time: 96 minutes
- Country: Turkey
- Language: Turkish

Envy (Turkish: Kıskanmak) is a 2009 Turkish drama film, written and directed by Zeki Demirkubuz based on the novel of the same name by Nahit Sırrı Örik, about a married woman who has an affair with the son of a rich man. The film, which went on nationwide general release across Turkey on November 6, 2009, has been screened at International film festivals in Adana and Istanbul.

== Plot ==
Seniha and Halit are two siblings who have lost their parents. Both are in their 40s. Seniha is an ugly woman, never married. His family prioritized his brother's needs and taught him abroad; He neglected Seniha and even rejected the marriage proposals that came to her, thinking "dowry costs will come". Seniha is forced to live with her older brother Halit, who returned to Istanbul after her parents died. When Halit got a job there, he went to Ankara with him. Halit then marries a young girl named Mükerrem. Mükerrem in her 30s, who is younger than her. While three of them live in Istanbul, they go to Zonguldak on a business occasion Although Seniha was good to Mükerrem before, she seeks an opportunity to use her to take revenge on her brother. After a while, he learns that Mükerrem cheated Halit with a young man named Nüzhet. Seniha uses this opportunity to tell her brother about the situation. Mükerrem's jealous sight of Seniha Mükerrem, who is jealous of his beauty, youth and attractiveness, digs well in the first place. Mükerrem meets Nüzhet, a handsome, rich, and flirtatious teenager in her 20s, at the Republic ball while her unhappy marriage continues and a relationship begins between them. Mükerrem is mostly with Nüzhet in his mansion, and sometimes in the fishing port with Nüzhet. Seniha, who is aware of these associations, tells the situation to her brother and the life of four people changes overnight.

== Production ==
The film was shot on location in Zonguldak, Turkey.

== Reception ==
=== Awards ===
- 17th Adana Golden Boll International Film Festival Best Actress: Nergis Öztürk (shared with Sezin Akbaşoğulları for The Crossing)

== See also ==
- 2009 in film
- Turkish films of 2009
