= Abbas in Flower =

- Directed by: Sinan Çetin
- Written by: Yavuz Turgul
- Starring: İlyas Salman; Şener Şen; Ayşen Gruda
- Cinematography: Sertaç Karan
- Music by: Cahit Berkay
- Production company: Kök Film
- Release date: 1982
- Running time: 87 min
- Country: Turkey
- Language: Turkish

Abbas in Flower (Turkish: Çiçek Abbas) is a 1982 Turkish comedy film directed by Sinan Çetin.

== Plot ==
Çiçek Abbas (İlyas Salman) is an assistant to a minibus driver named Şakir (Şener Şen). Şakir is a selfish and womanizing man, while Abbas is the complete opposite – naive and innocent. His only dream is to become a minibus driver and marry the girl he loves (Pembe Mutlu), whom his boss also wants to marry. Abbas buys a dilapidated minibus by borrowing money from a loan shark and starts working to pay off his debt. Meanwhile, he and his boss's ex-fiancée fall in love. Şakir can't stand this and steals the wheels and engine of Abbas's minibus. In dire straits, Abbas can't pay his debt, and the neighborhood loan shark seizes the minibus. Şakir insists on marrying the girl Abbas loves, and her father (İhsan Yüce), due to his better financial situation, agrees to give his daughter to him. On the wedding day, Şakir's sister (Ayşen Gruda) helps Abbas, and Abbas helps Nazlı escape from the wedding ceremony.

== Cast ==
- İlyas Salman - Abbas
- Şener Şen - Sakir
- Ayşen Gruda - Sükriye
- Pembe Mutlu - Nazli
