= The Crossing (2010 film) =

- Theatrical poster
- Directed by: Selim Demirdelen
- Written by: Selim Demirdelen
- Produced by: Türker Korkmaz
- Starring: Güven Kıraç; Sezin Aktbaşoğulları; Cengiz Bozkurt; Umut Kurt; Yücel Erten; Başay Okay; Ayla Arslancan; Tuğse Gökhan
- Cinematography: Aydın Sarıoğlu
- Edited by: Selim Demirdelen
- Music by: Selim Demirdelen
- Production company: ARTİ Film Production
- Release date: October 1, 2010
- Country: Turkey
- Language: Turkish

The Crossing (Turkish: Kavşak) is a 2010 Turkish drama film directed by Selim Demirdelen, which is about a devoted family man who comes home from work one day to find his house deserted. The film went on general release across Turkey on October 1, 2010 and was selected for several festivals, including the 47th Antalya "Golden Orange" International Film Festival and the 17th Adana "Golden Boll" International Film Festival, where it won several awards.

== Plot ==
Güven works at an accounting firm and leads an ordinary life. He is happily married and has a daughter that he loves more than anything. He boasts endlessly to his colleagues about his daughter's achievements. His daughter is equally devoted to him, calling him every day when she gets home from school.

After an ordinary day at work, Güven leaves his office, takes the bus. He walks on his empty street, comes home to his three-storey apartment building. He enters his apartment, changes his clothes, washes his face, and sits down on the sofa in the living room. The living room is empty. The house is empty.

== Release ==
=== Festival screenings ===
- 2010 Montreal World Film Festival (August 26-September 6, 2010)
- 17th Adana "Golden Boll" International Film Festival (September 20–26, 2010)
- 2010 Festival do Rio (September 23-October 7, 2010)
- 10th Beirut International Film Festival (October 6–13)
- 47th Antalya "Golden Orange" International Film Festival (October 9–14, 2010)
- 33rd Starz Denver Film Festival (November 3–14, 2010)
- 16th London Turkish Film Festival (November 4–18, 2010)

== Reception ==
Hürriyet Daily News reviewer Emrah Güler describes the film as, "a beautifully crafted story of a wounded soul and how the intersection of stories from his life with those of others lead to haunting revelation and redemption", and which, according to Today's Zaman reviewer Emine Yıldırım, "continues the prevalent notion in Turkish cinema in dealing with raw, dark and sullen emotions". "The story takes place in İstanbul", which according to Yıldırım, is, "shown here in its gray winter colors and atmosphere", but, "We are never really shown exterior images of the city except for the intermittent shots of highway traffic, for this is more of an interior film", where most of the action takes place in, what Güler describes as, "an office out of Franz Kafka's imagination".

"The film features stories of a handful of characters that at some point intersect with one another", which, "At first glance", according to Güler, "might give you the impression that it is a film in which the lives of the multiple characters intersect to a greater effect, exemplified by the recent films of Mexican director Alejandro González Iñárritu (Amores perros and Babel) or some of the Robert Altman classics, like Short Cuts", but "When boundaries are threatened, however, Kavşak is more the story of a lonely man who has put his life on hold indefinitely", and according to Yıldırım it is "lead actor, Güven Kıraç, steals the limelight". "The characters and their stories", according to Güler "are craftily developed, and soon the audience cares about each character and their story", "and there is no scene that doesn't serve the beautiful finale". But while Yıldırım commends the director for, "taking his time in this tight script", he admits some reservations, "about the secondary characters", which despite being, "used as a tool to explore the depths of vulnerability and human connection in the shadow of destitution", "are questionable", and, "not wholly convincing". Yıldırım concludes, "the main story is the full-on driving force of this drama supported with intense performances by the lead actors (Kıraç proves once again what a diverse and compassionate actor he is) and a cinematic language that supports the genuineness of the characters’ motivation and behavior."

"Demirdelen, who comes from a background in advertising, knows how to tell a story and how to tell it to maximum effect", states Yıldırım thanks the director, "for reminding us that emotional complexity can be shown through action and reaction, rather than through cerebral thawing", and commends that "he doesn't allow his characters to wallow in self pity and stare into the void more than they need to". "Instead of revealing a big twist at the end", which according to Güler, "is very much predicted from the beginning of the movie", Demirdelen, "seems to be more interested in how the obvious mystery will unravel throughout the movie, and how it will have an impact on Güven's life and his psyche. So when Güven tells of what happened in a teary monologue toward the end, the scene seems long and at best unnecessary, damaging the slowly built character development." "Here's hoping that it doesn't take that long for Demirdelen to begin shooting his next feature", Güler concludes, noting that, "There has been quite some time since his segment in 2005's Anlat Istanbul (Istanbul Tales)."

=== Awards ===
- 17th International Adana Golden Boll Film Festival
  - Best Director: Selim Demirdelen (shared with Levent Semerci for "Breath")
  - Best Actress: Sezin Akbaşoğulları (shared with Nergis Öztürk for "Envy")
  - Most Promising Newcomer (actor): Umut Kurt (won)
  - Best Music: Selim Demirden

== See also ==
- 2010 in film
- Turkish films of 2010
