= Yeşim Salkım =

Turkish singer and actress (born 1968)

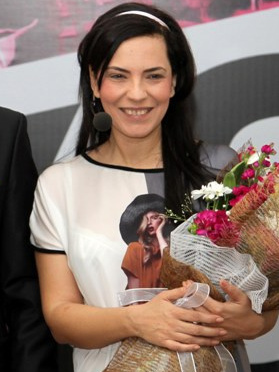
- Born: 12 April 1968 (age 57); Istanbul, Turkey
- Occupation(s): Singer, actress
- Spouses: Mustafa İmre (m. 1988; div. 1990) Hakan Uzan (m. 1998; div. 2001) Arben İçli (m. 2003; div. 2005) İlker İnanoğlu (m. 2006; div. 2007) Hakan Eratik (m. 2009; div. 2015)
- Children: 2
- Musical career
- Genres: Pop
- Years active: 1994–present
- Website: yesimsalkim.com.tr

Yeşim Salkım (born 12 April 1968) is a Turkish singer and actress. Her paternal family is of Albanian descent.

== Discography ==
Albums

- Hiç Keyfim Yok (1994)
- Ferman (1995)
- Yoktan Geliyorum (1997)
- Hep Böyle Kal (2000)
- Vefa Borcu (2001)
- Ayna (2005)
- Bazen (2006)
- Casablanca (2007) (musical album)
- Sen Nasılsan Öyleyim (2008)
- 7 (2009)
- İstanbul'da Aşk (2010)
- Bizim Şarkımız (2012) (musical album)

Singles

- "Sevgilim" (1998)
- "Yuvarlanan Taşlar" (2007)
- "Bambaşka" (2009)
- "Piyango" (2011)
- "Duymayan Kalmasın" (2014)
- "Şehrin Işıkları" (2015)
- "Unutursun Gönlüm" (2015)
- "Erkeğin Zillisi" (feat. Serdar Ayyıldız) (2016)
- "Rüyalar" (feat. Ercüment Vural) (2018)
- "Aramadın Aylardır" (Çılgınlar Kulübü) (2019)
- "Katil Uşak" (2020)
- "Niye Hayat?" (with Bade Derinöz) (2021)
- "Küstüm Ne Demek" (2022)

== Filmography ==
Year	Title	Notes
1992	Mahallenin Muhtarları	Guest appearance
1996	The Bandit	
1998	Ateş Dansı	episode 26
2000	Fosforlu Cevriye	
2001	Vizontele	
2001	Şarkıcı	
2005	Seher Vakti	episode 8
2005	Deli Mavi	
2007	Babam Çok Değişti Anne	
2007	Sessiz Gemiler	episode 20
2012	Huzur Sokağı	
2014	Kocamın Ailesi	
2017	Evlat Kokusu	
2018	Eğreti Gelin Ladik	
2020	Arıza	
2024	"Aldatmak"	

TV programs

- Yılbaşı Özel – ATV 1994
- Bir Dilek Tut – season 2; Fox /season 3; Star TV 2007
- Kadınlar ve Erkekler – season 1; 2007 ATV
- Yaş 15 – season 1; Fox 2009
- Hayata Şans Ver – CINE5; 2012–2013
- Yeşim Salkım ile Şeffaf Masa – TGRT Haber; 2021–

Theater

- Atları da Vururlar – 1998
- Casablanca – 2007
- Bizim Şarkımız – 2012
