= Kolpaçino =

Kolpaçino Rasim Eliminen dayi eliminen
- Theatrical Poster
- Directed by: Atıl İnaç
- Written by: Şafak Sezer; Kaan Ertem; Suat Özkan
- Produced by: Şenol Zencir; Selin Altınel
- Starring: Şafak Sezer; Aydemir Akbaş; Ali Çatalbaş; Hakan Ural; Ali Sürmeli; Eriş Akman; Hakan Aysev
- Cinematography: Feza Çaldıran
- Edited by: Hakan Akol
- Production company: İyi Seyirler Film
- Distributed by: Özen Film
- Release date: 29 October 2009
- Running time: 100 minutes
- Country: Turkey
- Language: Turkish
- Budget: $2,000,000
- Box office: $3,002,945

Kolpaçino (Turkish: Kolpaçino: Bir Şehir Efsanesi) is a 2009 Turkish comedy film, directed by Atıl İnaç, which stars Şafak Sezer as a rich kid who sets up an illegal casino in his parents home to help his friend pay off a mob boss. The film, which went on nationwide general release across Turkey on 29 October 2009, was one of the highest-grossing Turkish films of 2009.

== Synopsis ==
Tayfun is an errand boy working for Ateş, one of the most powerful mafia bosses in İstanbul. Tayfun has always been envious of the life led by the spoilt children of the jet set to whom he sells drugs. One day, with the intent of hitting it big, he steals Ateş's money. Ateş finds out about this and threatens Tayfun that he will have to pay for it. Frightened, Tayfun goes to another mafia boss, Sabri, for some idea of how to get the amount he owes to Ateş. Sabri tells him that the best way to collect money is to run an illegal casino. However, all the venues run by Sabri are known by the police, so they need a "clean" place to set up the casino. Özgür, one of the kids Tayfun sells drugs to, is the son of a well-to-do family that lives in a large mansion in an upscale neighborhood. Their house is the last place the police would think of raiding, so Tayfun and Sabri go to Özgür's house to ask for his permission to turn the mansion into a casino. Özgür, for the sake of some adrenaline, agrees to turn his family's mansion into an underground casino while his parents are away on an overseas trip.

== Main cast ==
- Safak Sezer (Ozgur Abi)
- Ali Sürmeli (Ates Abi)
- Hüseyin Elmalıpınar (Huseyin)
- Abidin Yerebakan (Ekrem Abi)
- Kemal İnci (Mutehahhit Kudret)
- Güzin Usta (Efendi)

== Release ==
The film opened in 32 screens across Germany on 29 October 2009, 252 screens across Turkey and 6 screens across Austria on 30 October at number two in the Turkish box office chart with a worldwide opening weekend gross of US$824,777.

Opening weekend gross
Date	Territory	Screens	Rank	Gross
30 October 2009	Turkey	252	2	US$628,236
29 October 2009	Germany	32	18	US$168,120
30 October 2009	Austria	6	14	US$28,421

== Reception ==
=== Box office ===
The movie was number two at the Turkish box office for two weeks running and was the eighth highest grossing Turkish film of 2009 with a worldwide total gross of US$2,424,173. That figure has subsequently risen to US$3,002,945.
