= Scapegoat (2011 film) =

- Theatrical Poster
- Directed by: Cenk Özakıncı
- Written by: Alper Erze
- Produced by: Kayahan Nacar; Ceyhun Büyükbeşe; Emir can Yurtlak
- Starring: Şahin K; Nuri Alço; Coşkun Göğen; Sevtap Parman; Ferdi Kurtuldu; Turgay Tanülkü; Yıldırım Memişoğlu; Derya Aydoğan
- Cinematography: Aydoğan Yıldız
- Edited by: Hamdi Deniz
- Music by: Batuhan Fırat
- Production company: Medya Mühendisi
- Distributed by: Medyavizyon
- Release date: January 21, 2011
- Running time: 83 min
- Country: Turkey
- Language: Turkish

Scapegoat (Turkish: Günah Keçisi) is a 2011 Turkish comedy film, directed by Cenk Özakıncı, starring Şahin K as a man with a dubious reputation trying to start a new life and win back his estranged son. The film, which went on nationwide general release across Turkey on January 21, 2011, is the first mainstream film from former porn star Şahin K.

== Production ==
The film was shot on digital equipment supplied by Arri and Weisscam.

== Plot ==
Şahin K. is a wealthy and famous (or, rather, infamous) man who is discontented with his life. All he wants is to leave behind his past in Germany, wipe the slate clean and start leading a normal, low profile life in the southwest coastal town of Bodrum. In the meantime, he is also trying to win back his estranged son, who turned his back on him years ago because of his infamous career. However, as Şahin K. strives to win back his son, he unwillingly becomes a local hero to whom the entire town turns to get their problems solved.

== Cast ==
- Sahin Yilmaz as Sahin K
- San Bingöl as Caner
- Ferdi Kurtuldu as Serdar
- Turgay Tanülkü as Tevfik
- Diler Ozturk as Hibnos
- Nebil Sayin as Macit

== Release ==
The film opened on nationwide general release in 100 screens across Turkey on January 21, 2011 at number 8 in the national box office with a first weekend gross of US$124,345.

== See also ==
- 2011 in film
- Turkish films of 2011
