= The Unforgettable Director of Love Movies =

1990 Turkish comedy film

- Directed by: Yavuz Turgul
- Starring: Şener Şen; Pıtırcık Akerman
- Release date: 2 March 1990
- Running time: 1h 46min
- Country: Turkey
- Language: Turkish

The Unforgettable Director of Love Movies (Turkish: Aşk Filmlerinin Unutulmaz Yönetmeni) is a 1990 Turkish comedy film directed by Yavuz Turgul.

== Cast ==
- Şener Şen - Hasmet Asilkan
- Pıtırcık Akerman - Jeyan
- Aytaç Yörükaslan - Nihat
- Yavuzer Çetinkaya - Hakki
- Oktay Kaynarca - Tarcan
- Gül Onat - Hasmet's Ex-Wife
- Arif Akkaya - Tolga
- Serpil Tamur - Betül
- Reyhan Karaçam - Ceren
