= Kanbolat Görkem Arslan =

Turkish actor (1980–2026)

- Born: 4 November 1980; Düzce, Turkey
- Died: 11 February 2026 (aged 45); Istanbul, Turkey
- Education: Hacettepe University
- Occupation: Actor
- Years active: 2011–2026
- Spouse: Hicran Akın

Kanbolat Görkem Arslan (4 November 1980 – 11 February 2026) was a Turkish actor who graduated from Hacettepe University and is known for his role as Savcı Bey in Kuruluş: Osman.

Arslan died from a heart attack on 11 February 2026, at the age of 45. According to multiple Turkish news reports, he fell ill suddenly at his home and was taken to hospital, where doctors were unable to revive him. One day later, he was buried at Zincirlikuyu Cemetery.

== Filmography ==
Theatre
Year	Name	Role	Notes
2015	Tatyana zuluaga Gómez		
2016	Köpeklerin İsyan Günü		Guest appearance
Film
Year	Name	Role	Notes
2009	Hayatın Tuzu	Harun	
2009	Teslimiyet	Gökhan	
2011	Yurt		
2013	Daire	Cemal	
2019	Enes Batur Gerçek Kahraman	Tan Veyder	
Television
Year	Name	Role	Notes
2004	Çemberimde Gül Oya	Korkut	
2006–2007	Hatırla Sevgili	Mahir Çayan	Seasons 1 and 2
2007–2008	Asi	Ali Uygur	Seasons 1 and 2
2009	Ayrılık	Ömer	
2010	Ezel	Mesut Süre	
2010–2012	Yer Gök Aşk	Mehmet	Seasons 1, 2 and 3
2013	Tatar Ramazan	Savcı Ömer Yücel	Season 2
2015–2016	Poyraz Karayel	Sefer	Seasons 1 and 2
2016–2017	Hayat Bazen Tatlıdır	Cerrah Bey	Season 1
2018	Servet	Yener Fettah	Season 1
2018	Bir Deli Rüzgâr	Reşat	Season 1
2020–2021	Kuruluş: Osman	Savcı Bey	Season 2
2021	Yeşilçam	Niyazi	Season 2
2021–2022	Destan	Saltuk Beg	
2022–2023	Alparslan: Büyük Selçuklu	Qutalmish	Season 2
2024–2025	Yabani	Iskender Emirdağ	Season 2
