= Circle (2014 film) =

- Movie Poster
- Directed by: Atıl İnaç
- Written by: Atıl İnaç
- Produced by: Derya Tarım; Tolga Avcil; Atıl İnaç
- Starring: Fatih Al; Nazan Kesal; Erol Babaoğlu; Kanbolat Görkem Arslan; Caglar Corumlu; Beren Demirkaya; Ibrahim Karamemet; Nalan Kuruçim; Arin Kusaksizoglu; Dogukan Oruc; Aysen Sümercan; Mehmet Ulay; Selen Uçer; Ertan Vecdi
- Cinematography: Hayk Kirakosyan R.C.G.
- Edited by: Ismail 'Niko' Canlısoy; Deniz Kayık
- Music by: Emre Dündar
- Production company: Lacivert Film
- Release date: February 7, 2014
- Running time: 90 minutes
- Country: Turkey
- Language: Turkish

Circle (Turkish: Daire) is a 2014 film written and directed by Atıl İnaç.

== Characters ==
Actor/Actress	Role
Fatih Al	Feramus
Nazan Kesal	Betül
Erol Babaoğlu	Arif
Nihat Alptekin	Avukat
Kanbolat Görkem Arslan	Cemal
Caglar Corumlu	Necip
Beren Demirkaya	Selin
Nalan Kuruçim	Gassal
Arin Kusaksizoglu	Erdem

== Awards ==
- 20. Adana Golden Ball International Film Festival - Film-Yön Best Film
- 20. Adana Golden Ball International Film Festival - Film-Yön Best Director
- 25. Ankara International Film Festival - Best Film
- 25. Ankara International Film Festival - Best Actor
- 25. Ankara International Film Festival - Best Actress
- 25. Ankara International Film Festival - Best Actor in Supporting Role
