= Hakan Albayrak =

Turkish journalist and activist

- Born: 4 June 1968 (age 57); Hanau, Germany
- Years active: 1983–present
- Spouse: Emira Albayrak (m. 1996)
- Children: 2
- Relatives: Sinan Albayrak (brother)

Hakan Albayrak (born 4 June 1968) is a Turkish journalist and activist.

== Early life ==
Hakan Albayrak was born in Hanau, in the German state Hessen to Ziya Albayrak, who went to Germany in the early 1960s, seeking work as part of a formal guest worker programme, and his wife Gülbeyaz Albayrak. The Albayrak's are of Circassian origin (Hatuqwai and Kabarday).

In 1970 the family moved to Rodenbach. In first grade of Adolf Reichwein Elementary School, he began writing stories.

In 1980 he left for Turkey, shortly before the military putsch on the 12th of September, "...the day I quickly grew up." Always uncomfortable with school life, he wrote the short story Mutiny in School in third grade of secondary school. After leaving high school in the second week of third grade, he now lives a life without diploma.

== Works ==
After one edition of Halk'a Işık (1983), at the age of 15 and with money lend by his mother, he published the cult Çete magazine with Nihat Genç in 1989.

For the Ihlas News Agency (IHA) he reported from Gaza and East Jerusalem about the Intifada. Again for IHA, he went to Sarajevo, Bosnia-Herzegovina, in 1994, where he became IHH (Humanitarian Relief Foundation) representative for humanitarian aid.

Albayrak is co-founder of Yeni Şafak daily newspaper, the weekly Gerçek Hayat and the weekly Sancaktar.

He works as a columnist at the daily Star and as executive editor at Sancaktar, published by Eyüb Gökhan Özekin.

== Imprisonment ==
In 2000, he wrote an article published in Milli Gazete, for which he was sentenced to 15 months in prison, in 2003, under Crimes Against Atatürk Law No. 5816. His sentence was reduced to six months, which he served in Kalecik Prison. After the conviction he commented: "No problem, plenty of time to enjoy leisure and read books."

== Gaza flotilla ==
He was on board of the MV Mavi Marmara when it was raided, and was detained by the Israeli Defence Forces before being deported to Turkey. Nine fellow Turks were killed instead.

== Political activity ==
In 2019, Albayrak was one of the founders of the newly formed Future Party.

== Personal life ==
He lives in Ankara, is married with Emira Albayrak, and has two daughters, Ayşe (1997) and Fatma (2002). Ayşe and Fatma are working together on short films and writing books. Hakan is the brother of actor Sinan Albayrak.

== Books ==
- Delikanlı Çete Yayınları (1989)
- Insan Köpeki Isırınca Nehir Yayınları (1989)
- Halifesiz Günler Denge Yayınları (1997)
- Hakan Albayrak Kitabı Vadi Yayınları (1997)
- Ebuzer Vadi Yayınları (2000)
- Kemalizm Terakkiye Manidir Vadi Yayınları (2004)
- Türkiye-Suriye Birliği Vadi Yayınları (2006)
- Batı'nın Soykırımcı Tabiatı Vadi Yayınları (2006)
- Bismillah Hotel Vadi Yayınları (2006)
- İslâm Birliği'nin Nüvesi Olarak Türkiye-Suriye Birliği Vadi Yayınları (2006)
- Zaferimiz Mübarek Olsun Vadi Yayınları (2006)
- Meleklerle Omuz Omuza Profil Yayınları (2011)
- Bu Devrimler Bizim Profil Yayınları (2012)
- Böyle Cihad Olmaz Öncü Kitap (2013)
- Kemalizm'e Son Öncü Kitap (2013)
- Ülkemizi Geri Alıyoruz Öncü Kitap (2013)
- Yezid Şiası Öncü Kitap (2013)
- Düşün Yakamızdan Öncü Kitap (2014)
- Bismillah Hotel Vadi Yayınları (2015)
- Sabah Koşusu Fazla Kitap (2018)

== Documentary ==
- Saraybosna Sevgilim (Sarajevo Mon Amour) (Directing)
- Şam İstanbul Köprüsü (The Damascus - Istanbul Bridge) (Directing)
- Afrika'da Türk İzleri (Turkish Notions in Africa) (Consulting, Narrating)

== Acting ==
- Mavi Sürgün (Blue Exile) (Dir: Erden Kıral)
- Bizim Ev (TV)
