= The Shadow Play (1992 film) =

- Directed by: Yavuz Turgul
- Starring: Şener Şen; Şevket Altuğ
- Release date: 1992
- Running time: 1h 43min
- Country: Turkey
- Language: Turkish

The Shadow Play (Turkish: Gölge Oyunu) is a 1992 Turkish drama film directed by Yavuz Turgul.

== Cast ==
- Şener Şen - Abidin
- Şevket Altuğ - Mahmut
- Larissa Litichevskaya - Kumru
- Ülkü Duru
- Metin Çekmez - Ramazan
- Cevat Çapan
