= Iskenderun Naval Base =

Iskenderun Naval Base İskenderun Deniz Üssü
- İskenderun, Hatay Province

Site information
- Type: Military base
- Controlled by: Turkish Navy

Location
- Location of Iskenderun Naval Base
- Coordinates: 36°35′33″N 36°11′24″E

Garrison information
- Past commanders: Rear admiral Turgay Erdağ

Iskenderun Naval Base (Turkish: İskenderun Deniz Üssü) is a base of the Turkish Navy on the north-eastern coast of Mediterranean Sea, 2.5 km (1.6 mi) east by north-east of İskenderun, Hatay Province in southern Turkey. It is assigned to Turkish Navy's Southern Sea Area Command. The base is adjacent to the Port of İskenderun.

== Iskenderun Naval Training Center ==
The base command hosts the largest of three naval training centers of Turkey, the Iskenderun Naval Training Center, located 2.5 km (1.6 mi) south of İskenderun on the motorway O-53 / E91. At the Iskenderun 1st Seamen Training Brigade (Turkish: Iskenderun 1ci Deniz Er Eğitim Alayı), Between 2,500 and 5,000 recruits are trained twice a year in shipboard duties and also marine operations that last 45 days. More than 1.5 million seamen recruits were trained and graduated from the training center in Iskenderun since its establishment in 1953.

Other two naval training centers, both in battalion size, are located in Sarıyer, Istanbul and in İzmir.

== Iskenderun Naval Hospital ==
Iskenderun Naval Hospital, with its 200 beds, serves all the naval facilities in İskenderun.

== Iskenderun Naval Museum ==
On June 26, 2009, Iskenderun Naval Base Command opened Turkey's third naval museum in the city center of İskenderun. At the museum, works and objects are exhibited from the Ottoman Navy and Hatay Republic era beside the Turkish Navy's. The museum, housed in a two-store building used since 1942 as the headquarters of the Iskenderun Naval Base Command, consists of nine exhibition halls covering a total area of 630 m^{2} (6,800 sq ft) and two workshops. Other Turkish naval museums are located in Beşiktaş, Istanbul and Çanakkale.
