= Lost Songs of Anatolia =

- Theatrical poster
- Directed by: Nezih Ünen
- Produced by: Nezih Ünen
- Starring: Cemile Yıldırım; Çetin İçten; Osman Turan; Osman Efendioğlu
- Cinematography: Aras Demiray
- Production company: Plato Film Production
- Distributed by: Filmpot
- Release date: March 12, 2010
- Running time: 102 minutes
- Country: Turkey
- Language: Turkish
- Box office: $51,714

Lost Songs of Anatolia (Turkish: Anadolu'nun Kayıp Şarkıları) is a 2010 Turkish musical documentary film directed by Nezih Ünen.

The film, which has been hailed as the first musical-documentary, features around 20 musical numbers shot on location in various places around Anatolia and examines the influence of ancient civilizations, rituals and mythology of the land on traditional music and dance.

== Production ==
Turkish composer, producer and arranger Nezih Ünen was inspired to make the film by Peter Gabriel’s Passion album, which includes Anatolian folk songs. Talking about the film to Hürriyet Daily News and Economic Review the director stated, "A hundred years ago, cinema and the music industry started to grow up and circulate freely. While the world was developing quickly in culture and arts, Anatolia was left to solitude despite all its riches," and "We should dote on Anatolia, protect all its riches and hand down this heritage to the next generations. This is our primary responsibility." The director also clarified that the film was meant to be a movie, not a documentary, since "Anatolia would reveal the truth about itself on its own. If it was a documentary, it would be too didactic. So I wanted it to be a movie composing its own poetry."

"West lovers started to assume themselves as the lords of Istanbul. They look down upon the East and east Anatolia as the ‘other.’ The ‘gentlemen of Istanbul’ who try to become Western without internalizing their own culture got stuck between East and West," the director said of the development of Turkish cultural attitudes since the foundation of the Turkish Republic. "In fact, when I realize that I do not know Anatolian people, I understood that I did not know myself either. After I became aware of this, I decided to do something about it and started from the point I knew best, he added. "Turkey should not be a country fearing the diversity of its people and their languages," the director stated, confirming that "Armenian songs would be performed for the first time in a movie. This is a beginning in Turkish cinema history. I hope this will continue."

"Financial difficulties did not deter us from our way," the director said of the project which saw him spend eight years wandering from village to village compiling the folk songs of Anatolia. During this research he took recordings for 350 hours and compiled archives of hundreds of folk songs from which he assembled the film. "There were many things to talk about," he stated: "I was unwilling to cut or remove any information or scene, but the time was limited." "I insist that the movie is poetry. I do not want to waste the materials at hand. So I wanted to prepare a documentary. Viewing the documentary, the audience would feel that they travelled Anatolia from one end to the other," the director said of his plans to prepare a documentary using the leftover parts of his research.

== Plot ==
A musical journey among the many historic places and ethnic peoples of Anatolia, this documentary offers live recordings of 20 lesser-known or forgotten local folksongs, performed by the native artists of that particular region.

== Release ==
The film premiered at the 28th Istanbul International Film Festival (4–19 April 2009).

The film opened on general release in 26 screens across Turkey on March 12, 2010 at number seventeen in the Turkish box office chart, with an opening weekend gross of $21,579.

== Reception ==
=== Box office ===
The film has made a total gross of $51,714.

=== Reviews ===
"There are many artists and musicians in my lands", musician Selahattin Güçtekin, who appears in the film, told Today's Zaman following the première, "but they are lost, they are not known because they do not have opportunities". "There were many more talented people than us, and they are not alive any more", added his co-performer and younger brother Fahrettin Güçtekin: "and we are following their lead so that their voices aren’t lost. We always would like to take part in such projects in order to support our culture." "This project was necessary for this country", prominent folk musician Arif Sağ told Today's Zaman following the premiere. "I think it’s a very smart idea", he said of the two brothers singing a traditional Kurdish elegy, "and it should have been made years ago. Those taboos should have been broken long ago." "Nezih is one of the musicians who knows Turkish music very well", Erhan Güleryüz told Today's Zaman. "This is a very good work about what exists in Anatolia. I believe we will be able to take lessons from this film even years later. I'm sure that there are many undiscovered songs in Anatolia, but thanks to musicians like Nezih, these songs are seeing the light of day." Hatice Ahsen Utku, writing for Today's Zaman, says that, "in a period when Turkey has started to recognize its minorities and different cultures", the "must-see" film, "is capable of providing an answer to the critical process which Turkey is going through with the question, 'Who are living in these lands and since when?'"

"This isn’t a film with a significant storyline or direction", and "it would be wrong to expect the film to be an in-depth musical investigation of all of Anatolia and its cultures", states Emine Yıldırım, writing in Today's Zaman, "However, the film gets to the gist of the matter and presents some of the most powerful folksongs from each region to the audience." "The beauty of it is that Ünen doesn’t re-perform the songs with a new choir or new orchestra; on the contrary, as the person he films/interviews starts singing the folksong, suddenly we hear the rhythm and beats of an off-screen orchestra supporting the singer." "What is so powerful about the recordings, besides the arrangements, is that they bristle with authenticity and capture the genuineness and zest of the subjects." "Lost Songs of Anatolia is not only a brilliant musical documentary (the rich visuals and dynamic editing support the technical aspects), but it also transforms itself into one of the most important visual archives of the last decade. Never before has such a systematic and creative audiovisual study of Anatolian music of such scope reached the public -- one which actually has a chance of getting the attention of the people and encouraging the notion of protecting cultural heritage."

Emrah Güler, writing for Hürriyet Daily News, describes the film as "a unique documentary on traditional music and folk dance from Anatolia", and recommends it to "those who would like to catch the rare chance of seeing and listening to a selection of the surprisingly distinctive traditional music and folk dance of Turkey."

== See also ==
- 2010 in film
- Turkish films of 2010
