= Son İstasyon =

- Film poster
- Directed by: Oğulcan Kırca
- Written by: Oğulcan Kırca
- Produced by: Oğulcan Kırca
- Starring: Levent Kırca; Başak Daşman; Suna Selen; Hikmet Karagöz
- Edited by: Oğulcan Kırca
- Music by: Cenk Celebioglu
- Production company: Kirca Yapim
- Distributed by: Pinema
- Release date: February 26, 2010
- Country: Turkey
- Language: Turkish
- Budget: $700,000

Son İstasyon is a 2010 Turkish drama film written and directed by Oğulcan Kırca and starring the director's father Levent Kırca.

== Cast ==
- Levent Kırca as Ruhi Bey (as Levent Kirca)
- Başk Daşman as Esra (as Basak Dasman)
- Korel Cezayirli as Önder
- Suna Selen as Hacer
- Hikmet Karagöz as Sevki
- Meral Küçükerol as Nilgün
- Ziver Armagan Acil as Fikri
- Gökçer Genç as Turgay
- Arda Öziri as Burak
- Hakki Evin as Extra
- Kadir Çalpan as Fighting man
- Özgün Aydin as Özgür
- Damla Cercisoglu as
- Ridvan Aybars Duzey as
- Murat Gönen as
- Aybars Irmak as Cemil
- Yasar Karakulak as Özgür
- Taner Rumeli as Arda

== Production ==
The film was shot on location in Istanbul and Uşak, Turkey.

== See also ==
- 2010 in film
- Turkish films of 2010
