= Avni Özgürel =

Turkish journalist, author and screenwriter

Mehmet Avni Özgürel (born 1948, in Ankara) is a Turkish journalist, author and screenwriter. He was writing for the newspaper Radikal. According to Today's Zaman, he is "known for his close ties to Turkey's National Intelligence Organization". He has interviewed Murat Karayılan of the Kurdistan Workers' Party (PKK).

He is the screenwriter of the 2007 Turkish film Zincirbozan, on the 1980 Turkish coup d'état, Sultan Avrupa'da (2009), on Sultan Abdülaziz's 1867 trip to Europe; and of the 2010 Mahpeyker: Kösem Sultan, on Kösem Sultan. He is the screenwriter and producer of 2014 Turkish film Darbe, on the February 7, 2012 Turkish intelligence crisis.

In 2013 he was appointed a member of the 63-member Committee of Wise Men convened to assist the Turkish-Kurdish solution process.

== Books ==
- İşaret taşları (2001), Timas Publishing Group
- Cumhuriyet ve din (2003), Ufuk Kitapları
- Osmanlı'ya hasret topraklar (2005), Ufuk Yayınları
- Ayrılıkçı hareketler: Ziya Gökalp'in Kürt Dosyası ekiyle' (2006), Altın Kitaplar
- Portreler galerisi : küllenen izler (2009), Etkileșim Yayınları
- Osmanlı'dan Cumhuriyet'e iktidar oyunu (2009), Etkileşim Yayınları
