= Turgay Tanülkü =

Turkish actor

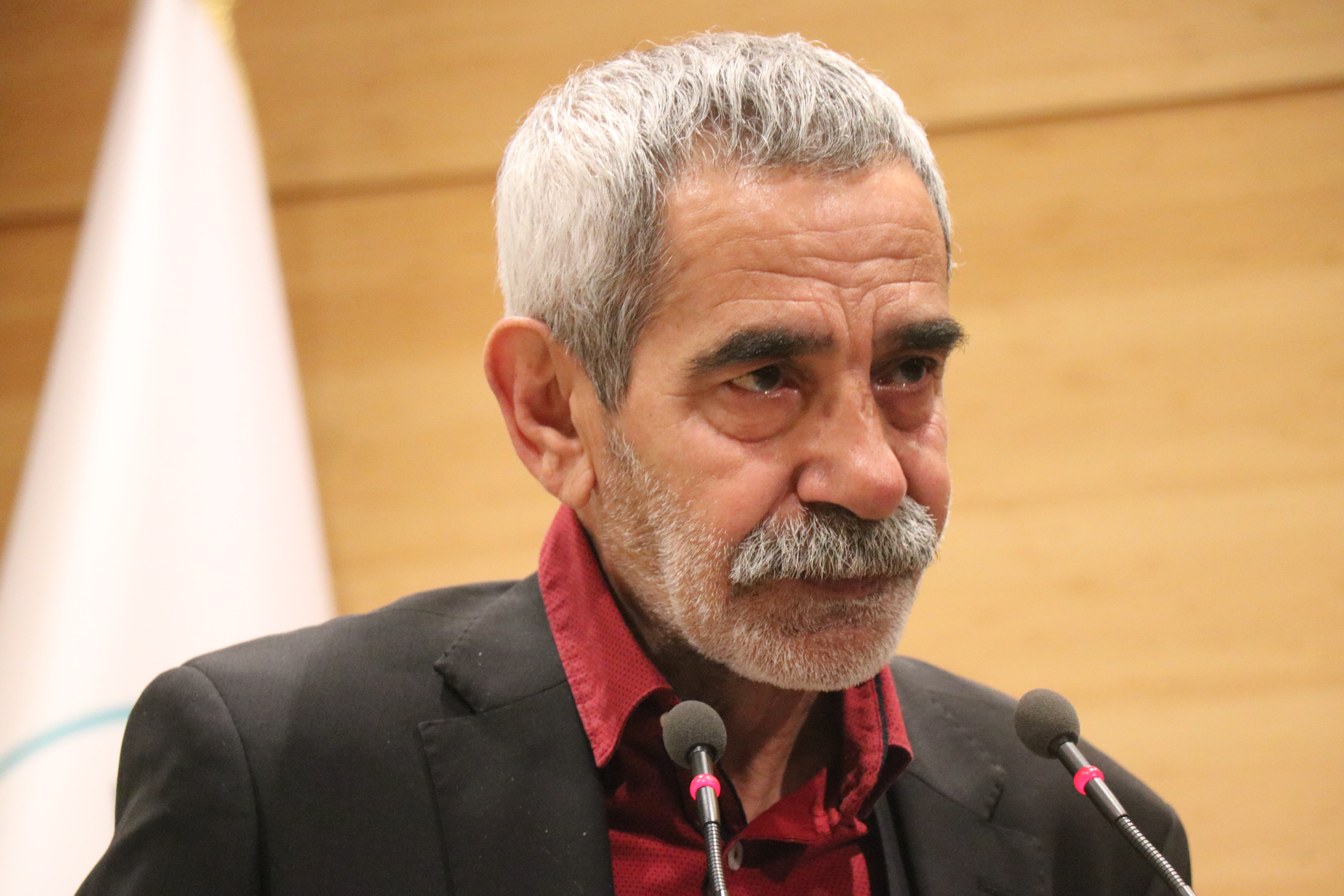
Turgay Tanülkü

Turgay Tanülkü (born 18 July 1953) is a Turkish actor.

== Selected filmography ==
Film
Year	Title
2011	Scapegoat
2010	Eşrefpaşalılar
2010	The Jackal
2009	Not Worth a Fig
2007	The Edge of Heaven
2021	Paper Lives
