= Nergis Öztürk =

Turkish actress

- Born: 25 May 1980 (age 46); Kandıra, Turkey
- Occupation: Actress
- Years active: 2006–present
- Spouse: Cemal Toktaş (m. 2014)
- Children: 1

Nergis Öztürk (born 25 May 1980) is a Turkish actress. She has appeared in more than twelve films since 2006. She had a leading role in Böyle Bitmesin. She also played in the hit period series Hatırla Sevgili.

== Filmography ==
Year	Title	Role	Notes and awards
2005	Körfez Ateşi		Television series
2005	Hacivat Karagöz Neden Öldürüldü?		
2006	Barda	Sevgi	
2006	Kızlar Yurdu	Yasemin	Television series
2007	Karayılan	Sona	Television series
2006–2007	Hatırla Sevgili	Ayla	Television series
2009	Kıskanmak	Seniha	Antalya Golden Orange Film Festival Best Actress; Adana Golden Boll Film Festival Best Actress; Nominated—Yeşilçam Awards Best Actress
2010	Atlıkarınca	Sevil	
2010	Gişe Memuru	Nurgül	
2011	Doktorlar	Direnç Kurt	Television series
2012	Yeraltı	Prostitute	
2012	Böyle Bitmesin	Nisa Komiser	Television series
2012	Eve Dönüş: Sarıkamış 1915	Gül Hanım	
2017	Sen Kiminle Dans Ediyorsun?	Ayfer	
2018–2019	Avlu	Zerrin Şahin	Television series
2018	Sevinç Vesaire		Short film
2020	Koku		
2021–2022	Yargı	Seda Tilmen	Television series
2022	Midnight at the Pera Palace	Eleni	Web series
2022	Bergen	Nadire	Film
2023	Sevda Mecburi İstikamet		Film
2023	Koku		
2023–2024	Şahsiyet	Meryem	Streaming series
2024	Yabani	Hande Emirdağ	Television series
2025	Umami	Nükhet	Film
TBD	Haysiyet	Nimet Karlıova	Television series
