= Black and White (2010 film) =

- Theatrical Poster
- Directed by: Ahmet Boyacıoğlu
- Written by: Ahmet Boyacıoğlu
- Produced by: Ali Akman; Başak Emre; Ahmet Boyacıoğlu
- Starring: Tuncel Kurtiz; Erkan Can; Şevval Sam; Taner Birsel; Nejat İşler; Derya Alabora
- Cinematography: Özgür Eken
- Edited by: Selda Taşkın
- Production companies: Akman Film; Gezici Film
- Distributed by: Tiglon Film
- Release date: April 23, 2010
- Running time: 90 minutes
- Country: Turkey
- Language: Turkish
- Box office: US$242,743

Black and White (Turkish: Siyah Beyaz) is a 2010 Turkish drama film directed by Ahmet Boyacıoğlu which tells the stories of a group of regulars at a famous bar in Ankara, and was described by the director as being a film "about loneliness, growing old, friendship, solidarity, and that special bond you feel for Ankara." The film, which takes its name from the Siyah Beyaz Bar and Art Gallery where it is set, is according to Today's Zaman reviewer Emine Yıldırım "an adamant ode to this bar", which "has been a landmark of high-end art and upper-crust intellectualism for longer than 20 years...and on a larger scale, the city it represents through its group of characters." It went on general release across Turkey on April 23, 2010 and was selected for the 47th Antalya "Golden Orange" International Film Festival and the 59th Mannheim-Heidelberg Film Festival.

== Plot ==
A painter who has lived a stormy life that still rages on in his 70s; a lawyer who, forced to retire after a heart attack, spends his time feeding snails and searching for the quiet life; a doctor weary of his job and abandoned by his wife; a businesswoman who has fashioned loneliness into a lifestyle... These are the regulars of Ankara's 25-year-old bar, Black & White, who gather here every evening. And then there is the bar's manager Faruk, a stubborn, grumpy, touchy but extremely sweet man.

One day, Faruk announces that he can no longer go on running the bar, and wants to shut it down. The regulars try their best to dissuade him.

== Production ==
Ahmet Boyacıoğlu, who made his feature directorial debut, following his award-winning 2001 short The Funeral (Turkish: Cenaze Töreni), with this film, is according to Hürriyet Daily News reviewer Emrah Güler, a revered name for film enthusiasts in Turkey. He’s the founder of the Ankara Cinema Association; organizer of the traveling film festival, the Festival on Wheels; representative of Turkey in Eurimages; a crucial name in Turkey’s Golden Boll Film Festival; and the unfaltering jury member and name covering various international film festivals for daily Radikal. And that, The cast and the crew are a testament to the respect and admiration felt for one of Turkey’s ultimate cinema lovers.

== Release ==
=== General release ===
The film opened on general release in 53 screens across Turkey on April 23, 2010 at number 8 in the Turkish box office chart with an opening weekend gross of US$67,864.

=== Festival screenings ===
- 47th Antalya "Golden Orange" International Film Festival (October 9–14, 2010)
- 59th Mannheim-Heidelberg Film Festival (November 11–21, 2010)
- 16th Festival on Wheels (December 3–19, 2010)

== Reception ==
=== Box office ===
The film was in the Turkish box office charts for 18 weeks and made a total gross of US$242,743.

=== Reviews ===
Today's Zaman reviewer Emine Yıldırım, states that this is, a film specifically addressing a certain group of people—those who are above 35, who are well off and those who consider themselves a part of a certain intellectual circle, and, for viewers who do not share the same socio-economic background or come from the same generation, the characters can come off as self-indulgent. This is not a film where much happens except for long group dialogues, Yıldırım continues, and although the director, also portrays them in their personal, intimate and alone moments, these single character studies are somehow not enough to completely engage the audience. Yıldırım further contends that, the characters that are best drawn out in this film are not the men but women, and, both female performances are close to perfect. The film has very sweet moments of friendship, and its restrained camera work and editing ooze a certain serenity and composure; however, according to Yıldırım, one sometimes wishes that the makers of the film occasionally smashed this sterile world of modernity to pieces.

== See also ==
- Turkish films of 2010
