= Secret of the Sultan =

- Secret of the Sultan Theatrical Poster
- Directed by: Hakan Şahin
- Written by: Ömer Erbil
- Produced by: Ömer Erbil
- Starring: Şerif Sezer; Mark Dacascos; Zeynep Beşerler; Burak Sergen; Sinan Albayrak; Emanuel Bettencourt
- Cinematography: Tolga Kutlar
- Music by: Engin Arslan
- Production company: Filmografi
- Release date: 17 December 2010
- Country: Turkey
- Language: Turkish

Secret of the Sultan (Turkish: Sultanın Sırrı) is a 2010 Turkish action film, directed by Hakan Şahin and written and produced by historian and journalist Ömer Erbil, starring Emanuel Bettencourt as an American professor in Istanbul to search for the sultan's mysterious chest in the hidden underground cloisters of the Topkapı Palace with the help of his friend Mark Dacascos. The film, which went on nationwide general release across Turkey on 17 December 2010, was made with the support of the Turkish Ministry of Culture and Tourism and the Istanbul 2010 European Capital of Culture Agency. It was described by Hürriyet Daily News reviewer Emrah Güler as a mixture of the "National Treasure" movies and Dan Brown's "The Da Vinci Code" and "Angels & Demons"

== Plot ==
An American professor travels to Istanbul to find a mysterious century-old chest built by Sultan Abdülhamid II, which he believes is relevant to the present political power games over oil. His search leads him discover long-forgotten underground cloisters at Topkapı Palace, now the Topkapı Museum, where he confronts a patriotic museum curator and the Turkish intelligence. Conspiracies going back to the Gulf Wars, the Iran–Iraq War, World War I, and as far as the final years of the Ottoman Empire are revealed in the course of his investigation.

== Production ==
The film was shot on location in Istanbul, Turkey, at such historic landmarks as Topkapı Palace, Hagia Sophia, Yıldız Palace and the Istanbul Archaeology Museums.

== Release ==
The film premiered at a gala screening, attended by star Mark Dacascos, at Istinye Park, Istanbul, on 9 December 2010.
