= Selamsız Bandosu =

1987 Turkish satiric comedy film

- Directed by: Nesli Çölgeçen
- Written by: Nesli Çölgeçen
- Produced by: Türker İnanoğlu; Nahit Ataman
- Starring: Şener Şen; Uğur Yücel; Üstün Asutay; Ali Uyandıran
- Production company: Erler Film
- Release date: 1987
- Running time: 107 minutes
- Country: Turkey
- Language: Turkish

Selamsız Bandosu (transl. "The Band of Greetingless") is a 1987 Turkish film.

== Plot ==
The film is a political satiric comedy. The setting is an unnamed Anatolian town. Being far from the big cities, it is more or less an isolated town and it is sarcastically called Selamsız ( "No Greetings"). Latif Şahin, the mayor of the town learns that the president plans to travel to East Anatolia by train. The railroad is close by and Latif hopes to solve some problems of his town by attracting the attention of the president and if possible inviting him to his town.

However, the town is a poor town and certain precautions have to be taken before hosting the president. One of the problems is that the town has no music band or musicians to welcome the president. Finally, a drunkard named Murat who claims to be a former band conductor is hired. Murat is tasked to form a band by teaching how to play instruments to a group of townspeople who never have had proper music training before.

While Latif and Murat are trying to accomplish the almost impossible, Latif's political rival Tahir plans to sabotage the band. The struggle between Latif and Tahir is full of funny events.

The big day comes, the band now is able to play at least a few marches and the town people with their best costumes are ready to welcome the president around the railroad. The train comes, slows down but it continues without stopping. The only thing the townspeople see is a waving hand of the big man.

== Cast ==
Character	Artist
Latif (mayor)	Şener Şen
Murat (conductor)	Ali Uyandıran
Tahir (Latif's rival)	Üstün Asutay
Musa (a member of the city council)	Uğur Yücel
Hasibe (a girl interested in Murat)	Güzin Çorağan
Latif's assistant	Tuncay Akça
