= Mr. Muhsin =

- Theatrical poster
- Directed by: Yavuz Turgul
- Written by: Yavuz Turgul
- Produced by: Abdurrahman Keskiner
- Starring: Şener Şen; Uğur Yücel; Sermin Hürmeriç; Osman Cavcı
- Cinematography: Aytekin Çakmakçı
- Edited by: Demirhan Ersunar
- Music by: Atilla Özdemiroğlu
- Production companies: Umut Film; Sinefekt
- Release date: 1987
- Running time: 145 mins
- Country: Turkey
- Language: Turkish

Mr. Muhsin (Turkish: Muhsin Bey) is a 1987 Turkish drama film, written and directed by Yavuz Turgul, featuring Şener Şen as a solitary middle-aged music producer, approached by a young man who dreams of becoming a folk singer. The film was screened in competition at the 24th Antalya Golden Orange Film Festival, where it won Golden Oranges for Best Film, Best Actor, Best Supporting Actor and Best Script, and the 6th International Istanbul Film Festival, where it won a Special Jury Prize, and was voted one of the 10 Best Turkish Films by the Ankara Cinema Association.

== Plot ==
Talented but inexperienced provincial hopeful Ali Nazik seeks help from down-and-out producer Muhsin Kanadıkırık to become a türkücü (a pop-folk singer). Muhsin who is a devotee of classical music and admirer of artists of the tradition, such as Müzeyyen Senar and Safiye Ayla, struggles to come to terms with Nazik's persistence on the increasingly popular and commercially lucrative arabesque.

Although initially dismissive and irate, Muhsin eventually rejects Nazik due to his reluctance to embark on a risky new investment, having already been evicted from his office and having to work out of a coffeehouse. Nazik becomes increasingly persistent, following Muhsin around and waiting around his flat. Eventually, Muhsin relents on account of Nazik's innate talent and his persistence despite the objections of the latter's family and takes him under his wing. They work together to make Nazik a star.

== Cast ==
- Şener Şen (Muhsin Bey)
- Uğur Yücel (Ali Nazik)
- Sermin Hürmeriç (Sevda)
- Osman Cavcı (Osman)
- Erdoğan Sıcak (Şakir)
- Doğu Erkan (Madam)
- Erdinç Üstün (Laz Nurettin)
- Tayfun Çorağan (Sunucu)
- Kutay Köktürk (Dolandırıcı)

== Awards ==
Muhsin Bey won Best Film, Best Actor (for Şener Şen), Best Supporting Actor (for Uğur Yücel) and Best Screenplay (for Yavuz Turgul) at the 24th Antalya Golden Orange Film Festival and the Special Jury Award at the İstanbul Film Festival.
