= Vay Arkadaş =

- Film poster
- Directed by: Kemal Uzun
- Starring: Ali Atay; Mete Horozoğlu
- Release date: 5 November 2010
- Running time: 100 minutes
- Country: Turkey
- Language: Turkish

Vay Arkadaş (lit. 'Wow dude') is a 2010 Turkish comedy film directed by Kemal Uzun.

== Cast ==
- Ali Atay as Manik
- Mete Horozoğlu as Dildo
- Fırat Tanış as Tik
- Demet Evgar as Nil
- Rasim Öztekin as Efendi Baba
- Mustafa Üstündağ as Sadık
- Erdal Tosun as Halit Aga
- Bülent Çolak as Sezai
