= Breath (2009 film) =

- Theatrical poster
- Directed by: Levent Semerci
- Written by: Hakan Evrensel; Mehmet İlker Altınay; Levent Semerci
- Produced by: Levent Semerci; Murat Akdilek
- Starring: Mete Horozoğlu; Birce Akalay; İlker Kızmaz
- Music by: Fırat Yükselir
- Production companies: Fida Film; Creavidi
- Distributed by: Medyavizyon; Maxximum Film und Kunst
- Release date: October 16, 2009
- Running time: 120 minutes
- Country: Turkey
- Language: Turkish
- Budget: $2 million
- Box office: $14,727,335

Breath (Turkish: Nefes: Vatan Sağolsun, literally Breath: Long Live the Homeland) is a 2009 Turkish drama film directed by Levent Semerci. The film, which tells the story of 40 soldiers in charge of protecting a relay station near the Iraqi border in southeastern Turkey, was adapted from the short stories Tales from the Southeast and Ground Minus Zero by Hakan Evrensel and is, according to Hürriyet Daily News reviewer Emine Yıldırım, the first Turkish film that tackles, through an authentic perspective and convincing realness, the contemporary situation of the Turkish army and its long battle with the terrorist Kurdistan Workers' Party (PKK) .

The film went on general release across Turkey on October 16, 2009 and won two awards at the 3rd Yeşilçam Awards as well as being one of the highest-grossing films of 2009, prompting its re-release on July 23, 2010.

== Plot ==
This film is about a small unit of 40 Turkish commandos in a remote two-way radio repeater station in southeastern Turkey at the first years of the 1990s, in a state of near-certain death, during the most violent times, in the conflict between the Turkish Army and the Kurdistan Workers' Party (PKK).

The film starts with a military helicopter coming to aid at Karabal Military Checkpoint after a firefight. The film then shifts to flashback to winter when Captain Mete (Mete Horozoğlu) along with his 40 men come to Karabal Military Checkpoint to curb the eponymous Doctor, a leader of Kurdistan Workers' Party (PKK). En route two of his soldiers are killed by a sniper equipped with a Dragunov rifle. On reaching the checkpoint he parades the soldiers and intimidates them for not following proper rules.

The soldiers start maintaining the checkpoint, creating an observational post. In the meantime they also talk to each other about their families and how tough it is to be a soldier in such a place. One day when Commander Mete is talking with his wife Zeynep (Birce Akalay) on radio call, Doctor intercepts the radio call and threatens him that they will all die. Mete orders his second in command Bariş (Barış Bağcı) to start stricter patrols in the area around the checkpoint. In one such patrol they ambush a group of insurgents, killing some and wounding a woman (Aslı Turkel) in the process. Commander Mete orders Bariş to take her to the checkpoint, where she is treated by the paramedic but the commander tries to strangle her while turning the television on to enrage the doctor. Later on Mete calls a helicopter and sends her to the hospital at the base.

Doctor then intercepts the radio once again and declares he will attack soon. Months pass by and one night a soldier calls her bride to be to wish her for her birthday. While making the call, the insurgents attack with small artilleries and heavy guns. In the ensuing fight many are killed from both sides. Bariş along with three soldiers feigns a retreat while the Commander Mete is gravely wounded. The Doctor, seeing all the soldiers dead enters and kills the commander but is killed by soldier Turgay who was wounded but not dead. Bariş showers bullets on the rest of the insurgents from a higher point and kills them, thus securing the checkpost. The helicopter from the start comes and takes the dead soldiers and the wounded Turgay. Commander Mete's death is declared to Zeynep in Istanbul.

The film ends with another military detachment being sent to the checkpost.

== Cast ==
Actors	Character
Mete Horozoğlu	Cpt. Mete
İlker Kızmaz	Srg. Ilker Cavus
Barış Bağcı	First Lieutenant Baris
Özgür Eren Koç	Resul (as Ozgur Eren Koc)
Riza Sönmez	Doctor (Voice) (as Riza Sonmez)
Engin Hepileri	The man in the taxi
Birce Akalay	Zeynep, The wife of Cpt. Mete
Ibrahim Akoz	Ibo
Serkan Altintas	Vedat Dinckaya
Turgay Atalay	Haberci Turgay
Ertunc Atar	Ertunc
Okan Avcı	The dispatch rider of First Lieutenant Baris
Baris Aydin	Cemil
Burak Aykurt	Burak
Engin Baykal	Radio Op. Srg. Sedat

== Production ==
The film was shot on location in Istanbul and Antalya, Turkey.

== Release ==
=== General Release ===
Thanks to cleverly edited teasers that barely gave any clue to the movie, a constant delay of the release date over the last six months and a nation overly sensitive to war, civil-military relations and nationalism, Emrah Güller, writing in the Hürriyet Daily News, states, Heated debates preceded the release of director Levent Semerci’s war drama “Nefes” (Breath) in chat rooms, Web forums, Facebook groups and mass media. Ironically, he concedes, the release of advertisement director Semerci’s debut film put a halt to many of the discussions because the audience had a hard time pinning down the message of the movie and labeling it as positive or negative propaganda for the military. The unprecedented success of “Nefes” lies in its ability to put a stop to all desperate attempts to maneuver the film into a nationalistic or anti-military stance, Güller concludes.

The film opened in 608 screens across Turkey on October 16, 2009 at number one in the Turkish box office chart with an opening weekend gross of US$2,018,862. Some, according to Today's Zaman journalist Mınhac Çelık, argue the timing of the highly publicized film’s release is critical because it comes almost simultaneously with the return of a small group of PKK members from neighboring Iraq who surrendered to Turkish authorities.

The film opened across Germany on October 22, 2009 and across Austria on October 23, 2009. It later re-opened in 106 screens across Turkey on July 23, 2010 at number ten in the Turkish box office chart with an opening weekend gross of US$7,569.

Opening weekend gross
Date	Territory	Screens	Rank	Gross
October 16, 2009	Turkey	608	1	US$2,018,862
October 22, 2009	Germany	65	16	US$259,166
October 23, 2009	Austria	8	13	US$38,786
July 23, 2010	Turkey (re-release)	106	10	US$7,569

=== Festival screenings ===
- New York Turkish Film Days (opening film)
- 17th Adana "Golden Boll" International Film Festival (September 20–26, 2010)

== Reception ==
=== Box office ===
The movie was number one at the Turkish box office for four weeks running and is the second highest grossing Turkish film of the year with a total worldwide gross of $14,727,335.

=== Reviews ===
Radikal executive editor İsmet Berkan, who considered the film a masterpiece with its realist characteristics, wrote, I can claim that it is the most beautiful and meaningful Turkish movie I have ever watched. It is a real masterpiece with its perfect technical and aesthetic aspects as well as its theme. The film displays the naked realities of the war. … Thank you, Levent Semerci.

Today's Zaman reviewer Emine Yıldırım describes the, "Full Metal Jacket"-inspired army epic, as, "one of the most disturbing films I have seen in a very long time", despite the fact she admits that she, "still remain undecided whether the film is a masterpiece or an emotionally explosive disaster." Following a slow start in which, according to Yıldırım, the film, "seems to launch into too much of an advertisement", "Semerci manages to create a stunning atmosphere of abandonment, fear and camaraderie", as, "we get a better inside look at these young men." "The film is currently playing to a full house in almost all of Istanbul's movie theatres", she says of its popularity, "all hypnotized throughout its 128-minute running time and especially transfixed by its final sequence." Though the film, which according to Yıldırım, "remains patriotic from start to finish", "does not aim to be political in the general sense," "what Semerci does is to directly put the viewer in the shoes of the commandos and make the audience confront a violent truth that it has already been aware of for the past 30 years but had never seen on screen in such a continuously graphic way". "The problem," she continues, "is that this particular film gets lost in its own heroism while over-emotionalizing the predicament of the soldiers, and it also lacks a comprehensive and tight story structure while its political stance remains too murky". "Despite its flaws", Yıldırım concludes, the film, "marks a milestone in Turkish cinema by being the first film to take the risk of duly tackling an issue that has long been evaded", and, "provides a succinct depiction of what being a soldier in southeastern Turkey entails". "Hopefully," she adds, "it will be the harbinger of a long line of films undertaking the condition of people whose lives are directly influenced by the Turkish military."

Hürriyet Daily News reviewer Emrah Güler states that, the teasers and the constant delay of the release date might have fueled debates before it met audiences, but the beautifully shot film featuring unknown actors successfully refrains from making any statements, instead of remaining a haunting slice-of-life film about soldiers. Semerci moves his camera skillfully, slowly and with confidence across the skies, naked mountains, and a few soldiers lost along the depressing landscape. Most of the time, the scenes of stillness are enough to give the sense of loneliness, despair, and meaninglessness of war, he continues, and when the movie moves into crafty and realistic scenes of military engagement, it refuses to stay a mix of detached action scenes but turn into tales of horror for everyone touched by war. Güller commends the cast by saying, Semerci’s selection of unknown names from acting schools around the country proves to be the right choice as no one character stands out, and it helps to amplify the sense of voyeurism into the lives of a real group of soldiers. He concedes that, For the Turkish audience, the experience of watching the everyday lives of these soldiers becomes more haunting as these border stations are the epitome of the lives of thousands claimed in the last two decades, and most people don’t have a clue what they look like or what it feels like to be on the edges of a country. The film strategically moves away from putting forward any message, and simply tells the stories of young men at war. It’s easy to interpret the movie in any way, depending on your take on the war. Semerci’s simply captures a group of scared young men ready to accept death because it’s the easiest option or, if they’re lucky, about to become damaged goods, scarred for life. This Güller concludes, is where The unprecedented success of “Nefes” lies.

Sabah columnist Emre Aköz, refuting claims that the film was anti-militaristic, said, The producers of the film, Levent Semerci, Hakan Evrensel, and Mehmet İlker Altınay, have used all the symbols of Turkey’s dominant nationalist ideology: Atatürk’s sculpture on the mountain at a height of 2,365 meters, the slogan of ‘Vatan Sağolsun’ (may the country survive), a compassionate big-hearted Turkish soldier who treats a PKK militant rather than killing her, the city dwellers who do not care about the young men defending the country. After using all these symbols, how can this film not be a nationalist militarist one?

Zaman columnist Nedim Hazar, who felt it wrong to shoot a film about an ongoing war, stated, Blood is still being shed. Ambushes, raids, and attacks are going on; therefore it is impossible to raise criticism, make a comprehensive analysis or sum up the fight with a film about a bloody process in which there are thousands of victims and slain soldiers with their families. Furthermore, it serves to cover up the genuine factors that are still instrumental to the war, and, he concluded, If you criticize the film, you will be an enemy of the nation and the army; in contrast, when you praise the film and its context, you will be labeled as fascist.

Galatasaray University scholar Hülya Uğur Tanrıöver, in an interview with NTV, criticizes the film for gender discrimination, observing, The film underestimates the difficulties women face in big cities. In a phone conversation between a soldier and his lover living in İstanbul, the soldier ignores the problems she has in the city, saying, ‘What difficulties can you experience in İstanbul?’ Moreover, in the next scene, the commander tells a soldier whose girlfriend has left him, ‘This girl would cuckold you if you had not separated.’ These are clear insults to girls living in big cities, and the film, from this point of view, has definite elements of gender discrimination.

=== Accolades ===
- 3rd Yeşilçam Awards (March 23, 2010)
  - Best Film Award (won)
  - Turkcell First Film Award (won)
- 17th Adana "Golden Boll" International Film Festival (September 20–26, 2010)
  - Best Director: Levent Semerci (shared with Selim Demirdelen for The Crossing)
  - Audience Jury Best Picture (won)

== See also ==
- 2009 in film
- Turkish films of 2009
- Kurdish–Turkish conflict

Awards
Preceded by Three Monkeys	Yeşilçam Best Film Award; 2010	Succeeded by Majority
Preceded by Autumn	Turkcell First Film Award; 2010	Succeeded by Majority
