= Züğürt Ağa =

1985 Turkish film

- Directed by: Nesli Çölgeçen
- Written by: Yavuz Turgul
- Starring: Şener Şen; Erdal Özyağcılar
- Music by: Attila Özdemiroğlu
- Release date: 1985
- Running time: 101 min
- Country: Turkey
- Language: Turkish

Züğürt Ağa "Poor Agha" is a 1985 Turkish film directed by Nesli Çölgeçen.

== Plot ==
The film follows an agha from the village of Haraptar whose traditional way of life begins to collapse after a severe drought and growing conflicts with the villagers. After selling his land, he moves with his family to Istanbul, where he struggles to adapt to urban life and earn a living.

== Cast ==
- Şener Şen - The Agha
- Erdal Özyağcılar - Kekec Salman
- Nilgün Nazli - Kiraz
- Füsun Demirel - The Agha's wife
