= Atıl İnaç =

Turkish film director

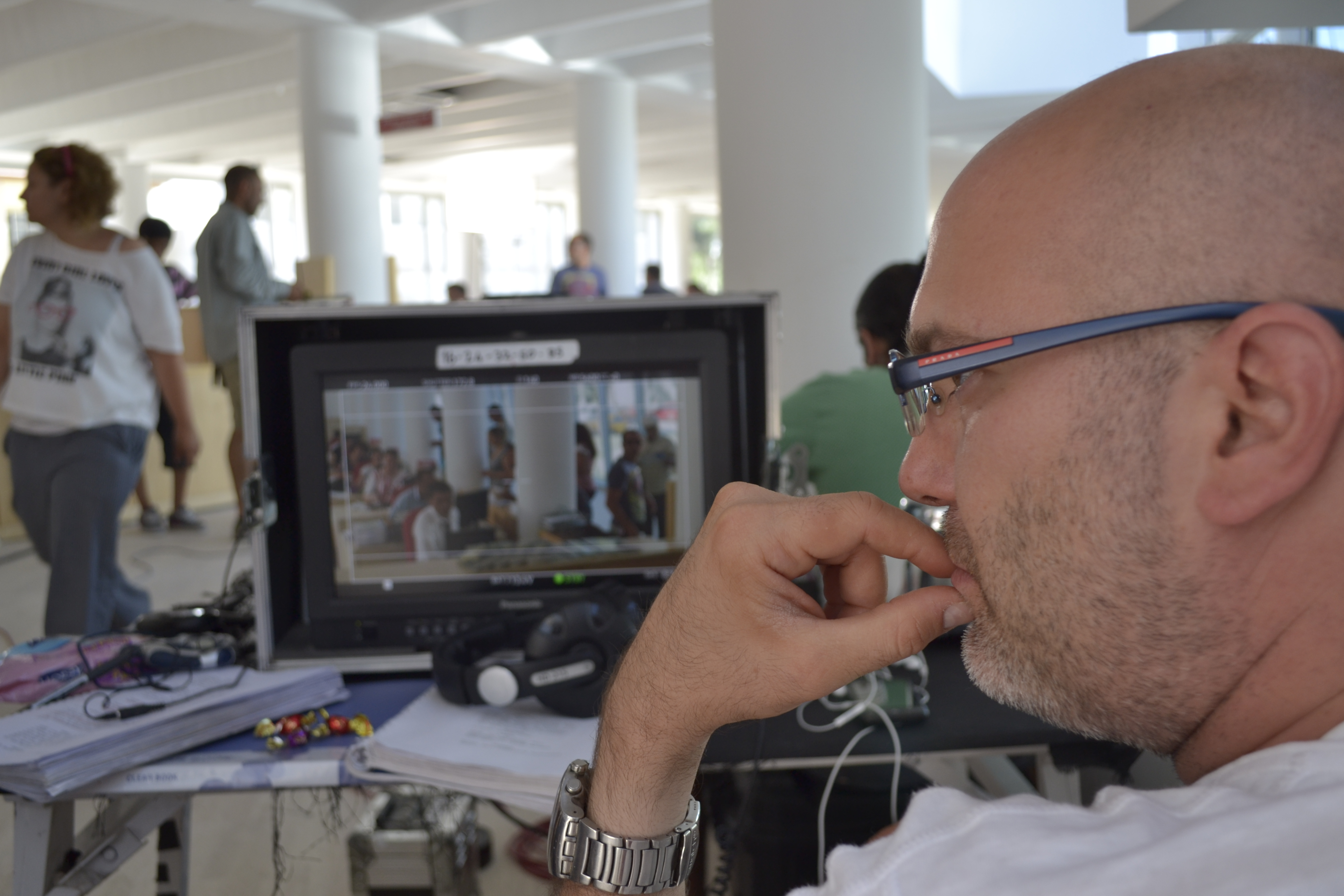
- İnaç on the set of Circle
- Born: 22 March 1975 (age 50); Ankara, Turkey
- Occupations: Director, writer
- Known for: A Step into the Darkness, Circle

Atıl İnaç (born 22 March 1975) is a Turkish film director.

== Early life ==
İnaç was born into a family of filmmakers: his mother was a screenwriter and his father a producer. İnaç went to the United States for high school education. Upon graduation, he studied philosophy at the University of Missouri-Kansas City. Later, İnaç earned his degree in Boğaziçi University (Istanbul), Philosophy Department. He continued his academic studies at Claremont Graduate University - Philosophy Department, specializing in philosophy of language.

He worked as a producer for TRT (Turkish Radio Television) in 3 radio shows which were broadcast nationwide in Turkey. İnaç's amateur studies in jazz music led him to produce and host jazz-oriented radio shows on Acik Radyo, a prominent, private Turkish radio station. He also wrote articles on and did interviews with jazz musicians and jazz composers.

== Filmmaking ==
During his graduate studies, he worked for Pittard Sullivan Branding Firm in Los Angeles as branding development consultant. Upon his return to Istanbul, Atil İnaç started writing and directing TV series and sitcoms for most of the major television networks in Turkey between 2003-2007.

İnaç completed his feature debut Zincirbozan in 2007. It was a controversial political depiction of the 1980 military coup d'état in Turkey.

Director's second feature Kolpaçino was a blockbuster comedy which was distributed both nationally and internationally.

A Step into the Darkness / (Buyuk Oyun) was his third film which was partially shot in post-war Iraq. The film went to numerous international film festivals.

He co-directed the feature drama The Partner (Ortak) in association with his director brother Ulas İnaç. It tells the story of a young, struggling actor who decides to change the course of his life, and starts pimping a young college girl to earn his living. They set one rule only: not to fall in love with each other. The Partner (Ortak) was theatrically released in late 2013.

İnaç later wrote his last feature film Circle in 2012. The story is centered on the social decadence and its destructive reflections on the lives of urbanized, educated and thus tamed middle class people in the midst of a political and economical turmoil of the past decade in Turkey. The film won Film-Directors Best Director award in 2013 Adana International Film Festival, and Best Film, Best Actor, Best Actress, Best Supporting Actor awards in 2014 Ankara International Film Festival.

== Filmography ==
- Zincirbozan (2007)
- Kolpaçino (2009)
- Yaşar ne Yaşar ne Yaşamaz (2008)
- A Step into the Darkness (2010)
- Partner (2011)
- Circle (2013)
