= A Step into the Darkness (2009 film) =

2009 film

- Theatrical poster
- Directed by: Atil Inac
- Written by: Atil Inac; Avni Özgürel
- Produced by: Ayfer Özgürel; Avni Özgürel
- Starring: Suzan Genç; Selen Uçer; Serdal Genç
- Cinematography: Atil Inac
- Edited by: Aziz İmamoğlu
- Music by: Sabri Tuluğ Tırpan
- Production company: TFT Yapim
- Distributed by: TFT Yapim
- Release dates: April 3, 2009 (Istanbul); September 17, 2010 (Turkey)
- Country: Turkey
- Languages: Turkish, Arabic
- Budget: $280,000

A Step into the Darkness (Turkish: Büyük Oyun) is a 2009 Turkish drama film, directed by Atil Inac, starring Suzan Genç as an Iraqi refugee who travels to Turkey in search of her missing brother after losing her entire family when soldiers raid their village. The film, which went on nationwide general release across Turkey on September 17, 2010, has won awards at international film festivals in Ankara, Antalya and Tiburon.

== Production ==
Atil Inac's second feature film A Step into the Darkness was in local theaters on September 17, 2010. The film was premiered at the 33rd Montreal World Film Festival in the summer of 2009, where it was highly praised by Quebecers. It was the opening film of the International Film Festival of Kerala, India. It won the Golden Reel Award for Best Cinematography at the Tiburon International Film Festival in San Francisco and Best Film Award at the South European Film Festival in Los Angeles. “A Step Into the Darkness” was written by Avni Özgürel - Atil Inac and produced by Ayfer Özgürel. It was shot on location in Iraqi cities of Arbil and Mosul, and in Adiyaman, Urfa, and Istanbul, Turkey.

== Plot ==
The film tells the tragic story of an Iraqi-Turkish girl, Cennet, who loses her entire family during a US-led operation against insurgents in her village in US-occupied Iraq. She makes a distressing journey through the border between Turkey and Iraq to find her brother who had been sent to Turkey for treatment.

== Release ==
=== General release ===
The film opened on general release in 27 screens across Turkey on September 17, 2010 at number 18 in the Turkish box office chart with an opening weekend gross of US$11,429.

== Reception ==
=== Awards ===
- 21st Ankara International Film Festival (March 11–21, 2010) - Best Supporting Actress Award: Selen Uçar (Won)
- Tiburon International Film Festival - Golden Reel Award for Best Cinematography: Atıl İnaç (Won)
- 17th Adana "Golden Boll" International Film Festival (Sept 20–26, 2010) - Most Promising Newcomer (actress): Suzan Genç (Won)

== See also ==
- 2009 in film
- Turkish films of 2009
