= Mete Horozoğlu =

Turkish actor

- Born: 11 October 1975 (age 49); Ankara, Turkey
- Occupation: Actor
- Years active: 2001–present

Mete Horozoğlu (born 11 October 1975) is a Turkish actor.

== Life and career ==
Mete Horozoğlu was born in Ankara. His family were immigrants from Sarajevo who settled in Bursa. He spent his primary and secondary school years in Ankara and Yalova respectively, and later moved to Karamürsel to enroll in high school. In 2001, he graduated from Anadolu University State Conservatory with a degree in theatre studies. In 2010, he got his master's degree in advance acting from Bahçeşehir University.

Between 2001 and 2003, he worked at Theatre Anadolu in Eskişehir Anadolu University. After moving to Istanbul, he was cast in various movies and TV series. He worked as a stage actor for Istanbul State Theatre between 2003 and 2004, Çığır Sahnesi Oyuncuları between 2004 and 2005 and Semaver Company between 2005 and 2007.

He was first noted by the audience with his role in the Yanık Koza TV series. His popularity increased with his leading role in the movie Nefes: Vatan Sağolsunas Yüzbaşı Mete, and his breakthrough came with Öyle Bir Geçer Zaman ki, in which he played the role of Soner Talaşoğlu.

== Filmography ==
=== Television ===
Title	Year	Role
Muhteşem Yüzyıl: Kösem	2015–2016	Zülfikar
Ayrılsak da Beraberiz	2015	Teoman
Benim Adım Gültepe	2014	Eşref
Kayıp	2013–2014	Mehmet
Öyle Bir Geçer Zaman ki	2010–2013	Soner
Hesaplaşma	2009	Ozan
Kalpsiz Adam	2008	Bülent
Eksik Etek	2007	
Yanık Koza	2005	Semih
Yalancı Karım	2005	Faruk
Dolunay	2005	Ünal
Şeytan Ayrıntıda Gizlidir	2004	Dr. Mümtaz
Kalp Gözü	2004	
Taşı Sıksam Suyunu Çıkarırım	2004	
Kampüsistan	2003	Erdem

=== Film ===
Title	Year	Role
Tehlikeyle Flört	2015	Sırrı
Açlığa Doymak	2012	Eyüp
Kurtuluş Son Durak	2012	Nejat
Vay Arkadaş	2010	Dildo
Kavşak	2010	Tamer
Nefes: Vatan Sağolsun	2009	Yüzbaşı Mete
Yedi Günah, Yedi Tepe, Bir Metropol	2005	
Hacivat Karagöz Neden Öldürüldü?	2005	Memur Çığırtkan

=== Voice over ===
Title	Year
Star Wars Rebels	2014
The Wackness	2008
Asterix and the Vikings	2007
Arthur and the Invisibles	2006

== Awards and nominations ==
Awards and nominations
Year	Award	Category	Work	Result
2010	3rd Yeşilçam Awards	Best Actor	Nefes: Vatan Sağolsun	Nominated
2010	15th Sadri Alışık Theatre and Cinema Awards	Best Actor of the Year	Nefes: Vatan Sağolsun	Nominated
2011	6th Vefa High School Kemal Sunal Culture Art Awards	Best Stage Actor	Cam	Won
2011	GSÜ The Bests Awards	Best Stage Actor	Cam	Won
2013	Haliç University The Bests of the Year	Best Actor	Kayıp	Won
