= Island: Wedding of the Zombies =

2010 film directed by Talip Ertürk and Murat Emir Eren

Island: Wedding of the Zombies (Turkish: Ada: Zombilerin Düğünü) is a 2010 Turkish horror-comedy film, directed by Talip Ertürk and Murat Emir Eren. The film was released nationwide on January 4, 2010.

== Plot ==
A group of friends gather to attend a wedding on a remote island in Istanbul. During the event, zombies appear and attack the guests. All of the events and the group's attempts to survive the zombie invasion are recorded on a camcorder by one of the friends.

== Production ==
Island: Wedding of the Zombies is the first film by directors Talip Ertürk and Murat Emir Eren. It was shot using the POV technique.

== Reviews ==
BZ Film gave the movie a three out of ten, saying that aside from some "unintentional laughs, the film doesn't offer anything new to the zombie subgenre". Todd Brown of Twitchfilm said that the film had many "technical faults" with sound and lighting but "enough depth to keep the audience captivated".
