= Davaro =

1981 film

- Directed by: Kartal Tibet
- Starring: Kemal Sunal; Şener Şen
- Release date: 1981
- Running time: 1h 34min
- Country: Turkey
- Language: Turkish

Davaro is a 1981 Turkish adventure film directed by Kartal Tibet.

== Plot ==
The story begins with Memo, who comes back from Germany to his village in south-east Turkey in the 1980s. Memo has collected all the money he needs, to marry the woman he loves (Cano). Unfortunately the whole village (especially his mother, Cano, and the leader of the village called Ağa) want him to kill the murderer of his father, but the man is still in jail. Memo persuades the village by saying, that if the murderer of his father comes out of jail, then he will fulfill his duty.

At the day of the wedding, the murderer of Memo's father (Sülo) comes out of jail. Now the villages is waiting for Memo to kill his enemy and revenge his father, yet Memo does not want to kill a human being, even if he had killed his father. Memo and Sülo decide to scam the village, by staging Sülo's death. Unfortunately this ends in Memo being charged by murder, because everyone believed, that Sülo died of Memo's hand.

On the way to jail, Memo and Sülo are on the same bus, which is later on stopped and robbed by bandits. The leader of the bandits (Bekiro) recognises Memo and takes him to their hiding place in the mountains, so that he don't have to go to jail. Also does Bekiro take Sülo, because Memo pities him. As time goes by Memo develops into a real bandit, while Sülo only does the dishes and receives no money, gold or other valuable objects. One day, Memo sees Bekiro who puts money into an almost full vase in between bushes and says it to Sülo, who tries to persuade him into stealing the vase and getting rich. Yet Memo does not want to betray his old friend. After a while Bekiro cannot stand the loneliness and sadness of Memo due to his separation (the police taking him away) with his wife and decides to infiltrate the village and to bring Memo and Cano together.

At that day, the whole bandit group is killed by the police, who found out, that the bandit's came down to the village, except Memo. He is taken away again by the police, for the "murder" of Sülo. While Memo is in jail, Sülo tries to get him out of there, so that Memo can show him where the Bekiro's vase full with money an other valuable items is. Sülö's plan works, he smuggles Memo out of jail and they get the vase. The next step is to go to İstanbul, because Memo is still wanted in his village and around. After they get there suspiciousness evolves between Memo and Sülo, because of the money. However Sülo accomplishes to steal the whole money from Memo and runs away. Memo now has to work hard to live, while Sülo is spending the money on expensive evenings with food and women. Afterwards Memo finds Sülo in an establishment and takes him with the money to his hotel room to punish him. Later Memo gets a letter in which Cano has written, that the Ağa will marry Sülo's wife, who technically is a widow, because of Sülo's "death". Sülo cannot stand the idea of his wife marrying another man. He decides to go to the village and kidnap his wife, but Memo is against it, because then the whole village will find out, that he was not man enough to kill his father's murderer. Still. Sülo manages to get through Memo to the village.

At the village, Sülo tries to kidnap his wife but he fails. Right at that point, Memo comes and finds out, that the only reason why the Ağa said, that he has to kill his father's murderer is, because he wanted to marry his wife. Yet Memo is furious and wants to kill his enemy until Sülo's wife tells him, that she is pregnant. Memo empathises with her and her unborn child, due to himself being only brought up by his mother. Instead Memo decides to pay every debt of the villagers with the money he has to the Ağa, so that they are not controlled by him anymore. At the end Memo goes back to the mountains, but this time together with his wife.

== Cast ==
- Kemal Sunal – Memo Davaro
- Şener Şen – Süleyman Hiyarto
- Pembe Mutlu – Cano
- Ayşen Gruda – Ayso
- Adile Naşit – Hamo
- İhsan Yüce – Aga
