= Uğur Yücel =

Turkish actor and film director

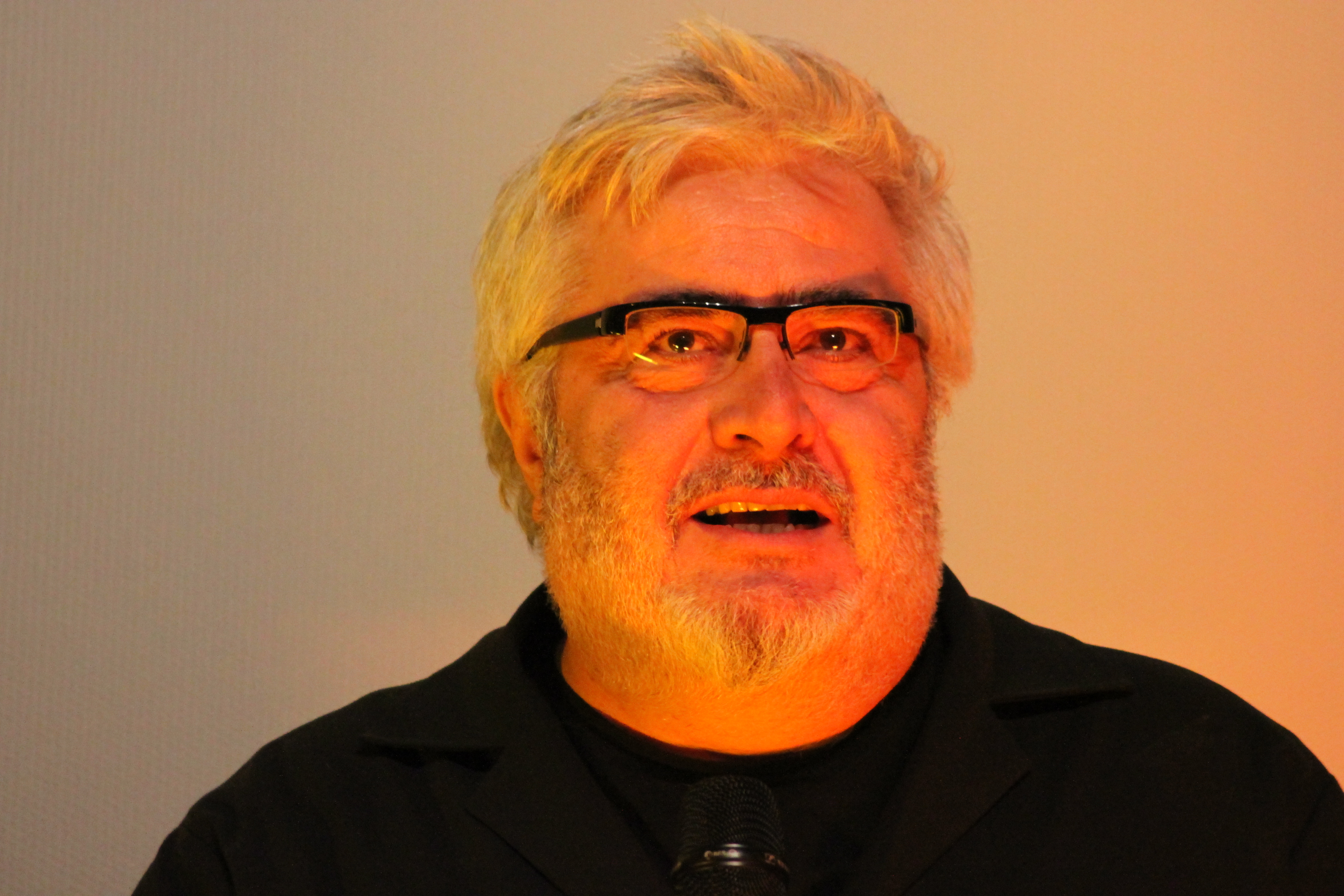
- Yücel at the 63rd Berlinale in February 2013
- Born: 26 May 1957 (age 69); Istanbul, Turkey
- Occupations: Actor, producer, director
- Years active: 1975–present
- Spouse: Derya Alabora
- Children: 1

Uğur Yücel (born 26 May 1957) is a Turkish film actor, producer and director. He graduated from the Theater Department of the Istanbul Municipality Conservatory (İstanbul Belediye Konservatuarı Tiyatro Bölümü). He took part in several plays between 1975 and 1984 in Kenter Tiyatrosu (Kenter Theatre), Tef Kabare Theatre, Dormen Theatre, and Şan Müzikholü. He was noticed for his roles in Selamsız Bandosu (1987) and Muhsin Bey (1987), then gained mainstream success when he took part in Eşkıya (1996).

== Filmography ==
=== Actor ===
- 1984 – Fahriye Abla
- 1985 – Aşık Oldum
- 1986 – Teyzem
- 1986 – Milyarder
- 1987 – Selamsız Bandosu
- 1987 – Muhsin Bey
- 1988 – Arabesk
- 1994 – Aziz Ahmet
- 1996 – Eşkıya
- 2000 – Balalayka
- 2001 – Karanlıkta Koşanlar
- 2003 – Alacakaranlık
- 2005 – Hırsız Polis
- 2008 – New York, I Love You
- 2008 – Canım Ailem
- 2009 – Soul Kitchen
- 2010 – Ejder Kapanı
- 2012 – Aşk ve Ceza
- 2013 – Benim Dünyam
- 2013 – Aramızda Kalsın
- 2014 – Soğuk
- 2015 – Yaktın Beni
- 2015 – Kötü Kedi Şerafettin
- 2016 – Familya
- 2017 – İçerde
- 2018 – Nefes Nefese
- 2018 – Muhteşem İkili
- 2019 – Yüzleşme
- 2019 – Cinayet Süsü
- 2021 – Kırmızı Oda
- 2021 – Fatma
- 2021 – Eşkıya Dünyaya Hükümdar Olmaz
- 2022 – Uysallar
- 2022 – Hakim
- 2024 - Sandık Kokusu

=== Director ===
- 1999 – İkinci Bahar
- 2001 – Karanlıkta Koşanlar
- 2003 – Yazı Tura
- 2006 – Hayatımın Kadınısın
- 2010 – Ejder Kapanı
- 2013 – Benim Dünyam
- 2014 – Soğuk

=== Producer ===
- 2003 – Alacakaranlık
- 2003 – Yazı Tura

=== Screenwriter ===
- 1994 – Aziz Ahmet
- 2001 – Karanlıkta Koşanlar
- 2003 – Yazı Tura
- 2006 – Hayatımın Kadınısın
- 2014 – Soğuk

=== Music ===
- 1998 – Gemide
- 1998 – Laleli'de Bir Azize

=== Editor ===
- 2003 – Yazı Tura

== Awards ==
- 1987 – 24. Antalya Film Şenliği (Antalya Film Festival), Muhsin Bey, Best actor
- 2004 – 41. Antalya Film Şenliği (Antalya Film Festival), Yazı Tura, Best film
- 2004 – 41. Antalya Film Şenliği (Antalya Film Festival), Yazı Tura, Best screenplay
- 2004 – 41. Antalya Film Şenliği (Antalya Film Festival), Yazı Tura, Best director
- 2005 – 16. Ankara Film Festivali (Ankara Film Festival)]], Yazı Tura, Mahmut Tali Öngören special award
- 2005 – Nürnberg Türkiye/Almanya Film Festivali, Yazı Tura, Best film
- 2005 – 24. İstanbul Film Festivali (Istanbul Film Festival), Yazı Tura, Best director
- 2005 – 24. İstanbul Film Festivali (İstanbul Film Festival), Yazı Tura, Public jury award
- 2005 – 12. Adana Altın Koza Film Şenliği, Yazı Tura, Best director
