= Nesli Çölgeçen =

Turkish film director and screenwriter

Nesli Çölgeçen (born 1955, Manisa) is a Turkish film director, and screenwriter. He graduated from the Faculty of Political Sciences of Ankara University in 1976. Since 1979 he has been a filmmaker.

== Filmography ==
=== Director ===
- Kardeşim Benim (1983)
- Züğürt Ağa (the Agha) (1985)
- Selamsız Bandosu (1987)
- İmdat ile Zarife (Imdat and Zarife)(1991)
- Oyunbozan (2001)
- Ah Be Istanbul(2004) Televizyon mini-dizi
- Son Buluşma (The Last Meeting) (2007)
- Denizden Gelen (2010)
