= Sinan Albayrak =

Turkish stage, TV and film actor

- Born: Sinan Taymin Albayrak; 27 February 1973 (age 53); Hanau, Germany
- Years active: 1993–present
- Spouses: Başak Daşman (m. 2010; div. 2011) Funda Ekincioğlu (m. 2012; div. 2015) Seda Yazıcı (m. 2019)
- Relatives: Hakan Albayrak (brother)
- Website: www.sinanalbayrak.net

Sinan Taymin Albayrak (born 27 February 1973) is a Turkish TV and film actor. He is the brother of journalist and activist Hakan Albayrak.

== Early life ==
Sinan Albayrak was born in Hanau, in the German State of Hesse to Ziya Albayrak, who went to Germany in the early 1960s, seeking work as part of a formal guest worker programme, and his wife Gülbeyaz Albayrak. The Albayraks are of Circassian origin (Hatuqay and Kabarday). He graduated from Istanbul University State Conservatory, where he took lessons from Yıldız Kenter. He had leading roles in medical series "Sen de Gitme" and comedy series "Yalaza". He was cast in many popular series.

== Personal life ==
He lives in Istanbul with his wife Seda.

== Theater ==
- Dönme Dolap (2019)
- Nerede Kalmıştık - Amphitryon (2003)
- Rumuz Goncagül (2000)
- Ivan Ivanovich Var Mıydı Yok Muydu (1999)
- Bir Cinayetin Söylencesi (1990)

== Filmography ==
Film

- Mitat (2023)
- Yunus Emre-Aşkın Sesi (2014)...Sultan Veled
- Sultan'ın Sırrı (2011)
- Esrefpaşalılar (2010)....Imam
- Kiralık Oda (2008)
- Kilit (2008)
- Bayrampaşa: Ben Fazla Kalmayacağım (2007)...Police officer
- Sis ve Gece (2007) .... Mustafa
- Çinliler Geliyor (2006) .... Yupi
- Döngel Kârhanesi (2005) .... Russian gangster
- Herşey Çok Güzel Olacak (1998)...Tolga Baykal

Television

- Mehmed: Fetihler Sultanı (2024-2025)...Zağanos Paşa
- Kader Bağları (2023)...Teoman
- İtiraf (2023, TV film)...Yalçın
- Kasaba Doktoru (2022)...Chief physician Yalçın Aygün
- Aşkın Yolculuğu: Hacı Bayram-ı Veli (2022)...Mevlüt Bey
- Kanunsuz Topraklar (2021-2022)...Göksel Yılmaz
- İyi Günde Kötü Günde (2020)...Bülent (TV)
- Kalk Gidelim (2019)...Ali Demir (TV)
- Kurtlar Vadisi Pusu (2015)...Sadık (TV)
- O Hayat Benim (2014)...Mehmet Emir (TV)
- Leyla ile Mecnun (2013)...Tom Waits (guest appearance) (TV)
- Tozlu Yollar (2013)...Tayfun (TV)
- Sen De Gitme (2012)...Mehmet (TV)
- Parmaklıklar Ardında (2007)...Tarık (TV)
- Yersiz Yurtsuz (2007)...Ishak (TV)
- Beyaz Gelincik (2006)...Melih (TV)
- Kadın Severse (2006) TV
- Sessiz Gece (2005)...Serkan (TV)
- Omuz Omuza (2004)...Cem (TV)
- Kurtlar Vadisi (2005)... Sadık (TV)
- Unutma Beni (2002)...Gökhan (TV)
- Nasıl Evde Kaldım (2001) TV
- Karanlıkta Koşanlar (2001) TV
- Şaşıfelek Çıkmazı (2000)...Rafet (TV)
- Yılan Hikayesi (1999)...David (TV)
- Kara Melek (1996)...Cameraman Mithat (TV)
- Ferhunde Hanımlar (1993) TV
- Geçmişin İzleri (1993) TV
