= List of Turkish films of 2011 =

A list of films produced by the Turkish film industry in Turkey in 2011.

== Highest-grossing films ==
Highest-grossing Turkish films of 2011
Rank	Title	Studio	Gross
1	Eyyvah Eyvah 2	UIP	US$20,505,652
2	Love Likes Coincidences	UIP	US$12,349,802
3	Valley of the Wolves: Palestine	Özen Film	US$9,749,899
4	God's Faithful Servant: Barla	Özen Film	US$8,797,985
5	Sümela's Password: Basic	Pinema	US$8,612,691
6	My Grandfather's People	Warner Bros.	US$6,130,561
7	Anatolian Eagles	Fida Films	US$5,669,800
8	And Then What?	Warner Bros.	US$4,260,060
9	Free Man	Özen Film	US$4,044,207
10	Kolpaçino: Bomba	Warner Bros.	US$3,764,575

== Events ==
January
21 — Haydar Demirtaş's My Father Is Making History (Turkish: Babam Tarih Yapıyor) receives Best Documentary Audience Award from 15th Boston Turkish Culture and Art Festival.
30 — Seren Yüce's Majority (Turkish: Çoğunluk) shares Grand Jury Prize at 23rd Premiers Plans European First Film Festival in Angers, France.
February
11 — 61st Berlin International Film Festival holds gala in collaboration with 30th International Istanbul Film Festival to promote Turkish cinema.
16 — 10th !f Istanbul AFM International Independent Film Festival opens with gala screening of Benedek Fliegauf's Womb.
16 — Seyfi Teoman's Our Grand Despair premiers in competition at 61st Berlin International Film Festival.
17 — Semih Kaplanoğlu honored at 4th Crystal Clapperboard Short Film Competition.
19 — Hamo Beknazarian's Zare (1926) screens at 10th !f Istanbul AFM International Independent Film Festival accompanied by Kurdish harpist Tara Jaff.
24 — 43rd SİYAD Awards presented at the Türker İnanoğlu Maslak Show Center in Istanbul.
March
6 — Derviş Zaim's Shadows and Faces gets special green line showing in the divided Cypriot capital.
9 — 8th Paris Turkish Film Festival opens with screening of Reha Erdem's Cosmos (Turkish: Kosmos).
12 — 9th Filmmor Women's Film Festival on Wheels opens in Istanbul.
12 — Selim Güneş's White as Snow (Turkish: Kar Beyaz) wins Special Jury Award at Sofia Film Festival.
15 — Beirut Turkish Film Festival opens with gala at Metropolis Empire Sofil Movie Theater.
16 — 22nd Ankara International Film Festival opens with gala at Ministry of Education Assembly Hall.
17 — 16th Nuremberg Turkish-German Film Festival honors Fatih Akın at opening gala.
17 — Awards presented at conclusion of 7th Akbank Short Film Festival at Akbank Art Center in Taksim, Istanbul.
20 — 3rd Golden Okra Awards presented on final day of 9th Filmmor Women's Film Festival on Wheels in Istanbul.
21 — 4th Yeşilçam Week starts in Istanbul's Beyoğlu district.
24 — 10th Boston Turkish Film Festival opens with gala screening of Zeki Demirkubuz's Envy (Turkish: Kıskanmak).
25 — Derviş Zaim receives Award for Excellence in Turkish Cinema at 10th Boston Turkish Film Festival.
27 — Derviş Zaim's Shadows and Faces (Turkish: Gölgeler ve Suretler) wins Best Film at 22nd Ankara International Film Festival.
28 — 4th Yeşilçam Awards presented at the Lütfi Kırdar Congress & Exhibition Hall in Istanbul at conclusion of 4th Yeşilçam Week.
April
1 — 30th International Istanbul Film Festival opens with a gala ceremony at the Lütfi Kırdar Congress and Exhibition Hall.
5 — Restored copy of Memduh Ün's 1958 melodrama Three Friends (Turkish: Üç Arkadaş) screens at special gala at Atlas Theater in Beyoğlu, Istanbul.
9 — 22nd Turkish Film Days in Munich opens with Yasemin Şamdereli's Almanya: Welcome to Germany to mark the 50th anniversary of the guest worker agreement.
10 — 3rd Turkish Films Week in Bosnia-Herzegovina opens with Nuri Bilge Ceylan's Three Monkeys (Turkish: Üç Maymun).
11 — Tindersticks start Claire Denis Film Scores 1995-2010 international tour at 30th International Istanbul Film Festival.
12 — Nuri Bilge Ceylan presented with French Order of Arts and Letters.
13 — 2nd Hong Kong Turkish Films Festival opens at Elements shopping mall.
13 — 2nd Ankara Mountain Film Festival opens at Çankaya Municipality Contemporary Arts Center.
13 — 30th International Istanbul Film Festival Labor Awards presented
15 — 3rd Turkish Film Week in Pristine, Kosovo opens with Uğur Yücel's Dragon Trap (Ejder Kapanı).
16 — 30th International Istanbul Film Festival closes with awards for Seyfi Teoman's Our Grand Despair (Bizim Büyük Çaresizliğimiz) and Tayfun Pirselimoğlu's Hair (Saç).

== Released films ==
=== January to June ===
Opening		Title	Director	Cast	Genre	Notes
J A N	7	Eyyvah Eyvah 2	Hakan Algül	Ata Demirer, Demet Akbağ & Salih Kalyon	Comedy	Sequel to Eyyvah Eyvah.
J A N	7	Free Man	Mehmet Tanrısever	Ahmet Yenilmez, Mürşit Ağa Bağ & Orhan Aydın	Drama	Historical biography of Said Nursî.
J A N	14	Paper	Sinan Çetin	Öner Erkan, Asuman Dabak & Ayşen Gruda	Comedy-drama	Premiered at Antalya Film Festival.
J A N	21	Scapegoat	Cenk Özakıncı	Şahin K, Nuri Alço & Coşkun Göğen	Comedy	
J A N	21	Kutsal Damacana: Dracoola	Korhan Bozkurt	Ersin Korkut, Şahin Irmak & Özge Ulusoy	Comedy	Part of Kutsal Damacana series.
J A N	28	Valley of the Wolves: Palestine	Zübeyr Şaşmaz	Necati Şaşmaz, Gürkan Uygun & Kenan Çoban	Action	Part of Valley of the Wolves franchise.
F E B	4	Love Likes Coincidences	Ömer Faruk Sorak	Mehmet Günsür, Belçim Bilgin Erdoğan & Altan Erkekli	Drama	
F E B	11	İncir Reçeli	Aytaç Ağırlar	Melike Güner, Sinan Çalışkanoğlu & Mustafa Uzunyılmaz	Drama	
F E B	18	7 Avlu	Semir Aslanyürek	Evmorfia Anastasiou, Muhammed Cangören & Tansel Dogruel	Comedy-drama	
F E B	18	Çalgı Çengi	Selçuk Aydemir	Ahmet Kural, Murat Cemcir & Erdal Tosun	Comedy	
F E B	18	Signora Enrica	Ali İlhan	Claudia Cardinale, İsmail Hacıoğlu & Fahriye Evcen	Comedy-drama	Premiered at Antalya Film Festival.
F E B	25	And Then What?	Özcan Deniz	Özcan Deniz, Deniz Çakır & Barış Falay	Comedy-drama	
M A R	4	72. Koğuş	Murat Saraçoğlu	Kerem Alışık, Hülya Avşar & Yavuz Bingöl	Drama	
M A R	4	Qirej (Kir)	Yusuf Çetin	Yusuf Çetin, Zilan Odabaşı & Yalçın Dümer	Drama	
M A R	11	Bir Avuç Deniz	Leyla Yılmaz	Berrak Tüzünataç, Engin Altan Düzyatan & Zeynep Özder	Drama	
M A R	11	Kolpaçino: Bomba	Şafak Sezer	Şafak Sezer, Aydemir Akbaş & Kemal İnci	Comedy	Sequel to Kolpaçino (2010).
M A R	11	Shadows and Faces	Derviş Zaim	Osman Alkaş, Hazar Ergüçlü & Popi Avraam	Drama	Part of a Turkish arts trilogy.
M A R	11	Saklı Hayatlar	Ahmet Haluk Ünal	Ceren Hindistan, Yusuf Akgün & Laçin Ceylan	Drama	
M A R	18	Çınar Ağacı	Handan İpekçi	Nurgül Yeşilçay, Nejat İşler & Celile Toyon	Drama	
M A R	18	Press	Sedat Yılmaz	Aram Dilbar, Engin Emre Değer & Kadim Yaşar	Drama	
M A R	18	Yürügari İbram	Harun Özakıncı	Osman Azman, Serhat Saylan & Yelda Günay Akbulut	Comedy	
M A R	25	Losers' Club	Tolga Örnek	Nejat İşler, Yiğit Özşener & İdil Fırat	Comedy-drama	
A P R	1	Hop Dedik: Deli Dumrul	Oğuz Yalçın	Atıf Emir Benderlioğlu, Orhan Bıyıklı & Ceren Şekerci	Comedy	
A P R	1	Merry-Go-Round	İlksen Başarır	Mert Fırat, Nergis Öztürk & Sema Çeyrekbaşı	Drama	
A P R	1	Meş (Yürüyüş)	Shiar Abdî	Selamo, Abdullah Ado & Aydin Orak	Drama	
A P R	15	Our Grand Despair	Seyfi Teoman	İlker Aksum, Güneş Sayın & Taner Birsel	Drama	Premiered at Berlin Film Festival.
A P R	22	Çok Mu Komik?	Adem Uğur	Taylan Güner, Aydan Burhan & Halil İbrahim Kalaycıoğlu	Comedy-drama	
A P R	22	İçimdeki Sessiz Nehir	Mustafa Serkan Eröz	Taies Farzan, Ali Yiğit & Asuman Şen	Drama	
A P R	22	Lost Freedom	Umur Hozatlı	Serdar Kavak, Vedat Perçin & Öznur Kula	Drama	
A P R	29	Zephyr	Belma Baş	Şeyma Uzunlar, Vahide Gördüm & Sevinç Baş	Comedy-drama	
M A Y	6	Ağır Abi	Oğuzhan Uğur	Halil Taşdemir, Senem Başak & Serhat Turan	Comedy	
M A Y	6	Devrimden Sonra	Mustafa Kenan	Fırat Tanış, Levent Ülgen & Şerif Sezer	Comedy	
M A Y	6	Küçük Günahlar	Rıza Kıraç	Macit Koper, Esra Ruşan & Berke Üzrek	Drama	
M A Y	6	Toll Booth	Tolga Karaçelik	Serkan Ercan, Zafer Diper & Nur Aysan	Drama	
M A Y	13	White as Snow	Selim Güneş	Hakan Korkmaz, Sinem İslamoğlu & Gürkan Piri Onurlu	Drama	
M A Y	14	Departures	Ali Yasin Akarçeşme	Gamze Ceylan, Ada Alize Ertem, Temi Hason & Yavuz Hekim	Drama	
M A Y	19	Şov Bizinıs	Mustafa Uğur Yağcıoğlu	Cengiz Küçükayvaz, Cem Kılıç & Zeynep Beşerler	Comedy	
M A Y	19	Türkan	Cemal Şan	Rüçhan Çalışkur, Ragıp Savaş & Tardu Flordun	Drama	Biography of Türkan Saylan.
M A Y	20	Misafir	Ozan Aksungur	Halit Ergenç, Lale Mansur & Yeşim Ceren Bozoğlu	Drama	
J U N	3	Kaledeki Yalnızlık	Volga Sorgu	Numan Çakır, Özlem Tekin & Erkan Can	Drama	
J U N	10	Adalet Oyunu	Mahur Özmen & Ali Özuyar	Erol Keskin, Mustafa Uğurlu & Tolga Evren	Drama	
J U N	17	Öfkeli Çılgınlık Karamsar Çile	Hatice Yakar	Asiye Dinçsoy, Barış Koçak & Hatice Yalçın	Drama	

=== July to December ===
Opening		Title	Director	Cast	Genre	Notes
J L Y	15	Bul Beni	Evre Türkel	Melih Ekener, Müşfik Kenter & Kenan Ece	Drama	
S E P	9	Hair	Tayfun Pirselimoğlu	Ayberk Pekcan, Nazan Kesal & Rıza Akın	Drama	
S E P	23	Once Upon a Time in Anatolia	Nuri Bilge Ceylan	Yılmaz Erdoğan, Taner Birsel & Ufuk Karaali	Drama	
S E P	30	September	Cemil Ağacıkoğlu	Turgay Aydın, Görkem Yeltan & Elena Polyanskaya	Drama	
S E P	30	Sealed Mansion	Serkant Yaşar Kutlubay	Sibel Gökçe, Murat Yatman & Özlem Yücel	Horror	
S E P	30	Tales from Kars	Emre Akay, Özcan Alper, Zehra Derya Koç, Ülkü Oktay & Ahu Öztürk	Şebnem Köstem, Deniz Çevik & Birsu Demir	Drama	
O C T	14	Bendeyar	Joel Leang	Ümit Olcay, Haşim Akten & Şemsa Deniz Tolunay	Action	
O C T	14	The Son	Atilla Cengiz	Rıza Akın, Enes Atış & Nurinisa Yıldırım	Drama	
N O V	4	Allah's Devout Servant: Barla	Orhan Öztürk Esin	Fatih Gök, Enver Seyitoglu, Engin Yuksel, Sener Savas, Ugur Aslanoglu	Drama, Animation	
N O V	11	Anatolian Eagles	Omer Vargi	Engin Altan	Action, Adventure, Drama	

== See also ==
- 2011 in Turkey
