= 10th !f Istanbul AFM International Independent Film Festival =

- Festival Poster
- Opening film: Womb
- Location: Istanbul & Ankara, Turkey
- No. of films: 85
- Festival date: Istanbul: February 17–27, 2011; Ankara: March 2–6, 2011
- Website: http://www.ifistanbul.com

!f Istanbul
- 9th

The 10th !f Istanbul AFM International Independent Film Festival was a film festival held in Istanbul, Turkey, from February 17 to 27, 2011, and in Ankara, Turkey from March 2 to 6, 2011. 85 films were screened in 17 categories at Beyoğlu AFM Fitaş, Caddebostan AFM Budak, AFM İstinye Park, and Cinebonus Maçka G-Mall in Istanbul. Chilean director Alejandro Jodorowsky was in attendance as guest of honour at the festival, which included the first ever Turkish theatrical screening of his Santa Sangre (1989). British director Chris Morris was also in attendance to present his debut feature Four Lions (2009).

This edition of the AFM International Independent Film Festival, which opened on February 16 with a gala screening of Womb directed by Benedek Fliegauf, held its opening party, featuring a live set by Jim Stanton, at The Hall club in Beyoğlu on February 18.

The Sundance Institute hosted nine film screenings, a screenwriting panel, a panel on Sundance Lab and an interactive case study on how the full circle of the Institute works, featuring American screenwriters Bill Wheeler and Wesley Strick, Israeli director Etgar Keret and several of the institute's directors at this edition of the festival as part of the Film Forward program initiated under the incentive of U.S. President Barack Obama.

Other features of the festival included two performances of director Sam Green's live cinema Utopia in 4 Movements supported by the U.S. State Department, a one-off showing of Hamo Beknazarian's Zare (1926) with live accompaniment by Kurdish harpist Tara Jaff, and the !f 2: Istanbul Live project, initiated last year in cooperation with MUBI, simultaneously screened five festival films in 25 cities across the region.

== Programmes ==
=== !f Inspired International Film Competition ===
Eight features by emerging international directors from, chosen to highlight films which show technical innovation, bold narrative and courageous storytelling, were selected to compete for the Most Inspired Director Award.

- Winner: The Four Times (Italian: Le Quattro Volte) directed by Michelangelo Frammartino
  - 22nd of May (Dutch: 22 Mei) directed by Koen Mortier
  - Merry-Go-Round (Turkish: Atlıkarınca) directed by İlksen Başarır
  - Our Day Will Come (French: Notre Jour Viendra) directed by Romain Gavras
  - Nuummioq directed by Torben Bech & Otto Rosing
  - Pál Adrienn directed by Ágnes Kocsis
  - R directed by Michael Noer & Tobias Lindholm
  - We Are What We Are (Spanish: Somos Lo Que Hay) directed by Jorge Michel Grau

== See also ==
- 2011 in film
- Turkish films of 2011
