= 30th International Istanbul Film Festival =

2011 film festival in Turkey

- Festival Poster
- Location: Istanbul, Turkey
- Festival date: April 2–17, 2011
- Website: http://film.iksv.org/en

Istanbul Film Festival
- 29th

The 30th International Istanbul Film Festival (Turkish: 30. Uluslararası İstanbul Film Festivali) was a film festival held in Istanbul, Turkey, which ran from April 2 to 17, 2011. 232 films were screened in 21 categories at Atlas, Beyoğlu, Fitaş, Pera Museum Cinema, Nişantaşı CityLife, and Kadıköy Rexx.

== History ==
This edition of the International Istanbul Film Festival was organized by the Istanbul Foundation for Culture and Arts (İKSV), accredited by FIAPF, and opened with a gala ceremony at the Lütfi Kırdar Congress and Exhibition Hall on April 1, 2010, at which a host of celebrities, including Saadet Işıl Aksoy, Mert Fırat, İzzet Günay, Mehmet Günsür, Semih Kaplanoğlu, Özgü Namal, Türkan Şoray, Hale Soygazi, Yeşim Ustaoğlu, and Serra Yılmaz discussed their memories of the festival accompanied by footage from the festival's previous editions, including archive street interviews with festival-goers, and honorary awards were bestowed upon their recipients, including Isabelle Huppert whose Copacabana was shown as the opening film of the festival.

British rock band Tindersticks started their Claire Denis Film Scores 1995-2010 international tour on April 11 with a live performance of scores the band made for French auteur Claire Denis. The festival also included a preview of the cinematic content of the 12th Istanbul Biennial which was shown in a special selection titled "Untitled (Film)", organised in a special collaboration.

A special anniversary book titled 30: 30 Years from 20 Directors in which 20 directors discuss the role of the festival in their personal histories was published and an exhibition of photos of the contributors by photographer Muhsin Akgün, taken in different spots at the Emek, Atlas, Beyoğlu, Sinepop, and Yeşilçam theaters in Beyoğlu, was exhibited in the Atlas Arcade, while the 30 Years in Film blog, launched in February, allowed festival audiences to share their own memories of the festival.

A special gala was held at the 61st Berlin International Film Festival on February 11, 2011, to celebrate this anniversary edition of the festival and to promote Turkish cinema.

== Awards ==
=== Honorary Cinema Awards ===
- Turkish actors Metin Akpınar and Zeki Alasya
- Hungarian director Belá Tarr
- French actress Isabelle Huppert
- Turkish director Yusuf Kurçenli
- Turkish director of photography Ertunç Şenkay

== See also ==
- 2011 in film
- Turkish films of 2011
