= James Stanton =

James Stanton may refer to:

- James Stanton V (1771–1829), namesake of Stantonsburg, North Carolina
- Jimmy Stanton (1860–1932), English footballer
- James V. Stanton (1932–2022), U.S. representative from Ohio
- James M. Stanton (born 1946), American bishop
- James Stanton (water polo) (born 1983), Australian water polo player
- Jamie Stanton (alpine skier) (born 1994), American Paralympic alpine skier

== See also ==
- Jim Stanton, composer and writer
- James Tanton (born 1966), Australian mathematician and math educator
- Jamie Stanton (born 1995), Australian rules footballer
