= TNK =

The abbreviation TNK may refer to:

- Tenecteplase (TNK) – an enzyme used as a thrombolytic drug
- TNK-BP Ltd. – a Russian oil company
- The Japanese animation studio TNK
- TNK – a Turkish band
- The Beatles song Tomorrow Never Knows
- TN Krishnan, Indian violinist
- Tanakh – the Hebrew Bible
- Tin King stop – a Light Rail stop in Hong Kong
