= Aksel (surname) =

Aksel (Turkish literally "white (ak) flood (sel)") is a Turkish surname. Notable people with the surname include:

== People ==
- Ayda Aksel (born 1962), Turkish actress
- Gürsel Aksel (1937–1978), Turkish footballer
