= Love Likes Coincidences =

- Theatrical Poster
- Directed by: Ömer Faruk Sorak
- Screenplay by: Nuran Evren Şit
- Story by: Ipek Sorak
- Produced by: Oğuz Peri
- Starring: Mehmet Günsür; Batuhan Karacakaya; Belçim Bilgin Erdoğan; Altan Erkekli; Yiğit Özşener; Ayda Aksel; Şebnem Sönmez; Hüseyin Avni Danyal; Yılmaz Gruda
- Cinematography: Veli Kuzlu
- Edited by: Çağrı Türkkan
- Music by: Ozan Çolakoğlu
- Production company: Böcek Yapım
- Distributed by: UIP
- Release date: February 4, 2011
- Running time: 97 minutes
- Country: Turkey
- Language: Turkish

Love Likes Coincidences (Turkish: Aşk Tesadüfleri Sever) is a 2011 Turkish drama film, directed by Ömer Faruk Sorak, starring Mehmet Günsür and Belçim Bilgin Erdoğan as star crossed lovers whose lives are intertwined by a series of coincidences. The film, which opened on February 4, 2011 at number 1 in the Turkish box office, is one of the highest grossing Turkish films of 2011. In 2014, Turkish Ministry of Culture and Tourism conducted a survey in celebration of 100th year of Turkish Cinema, where the film has been selected as a part of 100 Best Turkish Films of all time, voted by over 100 universities, non-governmental organizations, and 360,000 individual votes.

== Production ==
The film was shot on location in Istanbul and Ankara in 2010. The majority of the filming took place in Ankara. Some of the filming places in the city are: Şinasi Sahnesi, one of the most prominent theatres in the city, followed by Botanik Park, a park known for its view of Atakule, an important tower of Ankara's modern skyline. An old store in Gazi Neighbourhood has been transformed into 'Photo Turgut' and was used as the photography studio of Mehmet Günsür's father in the film, played by Altan Erkekli. The neighborhood of Gazi, a sub-neighbourhood of the Yeni Mahalle area has also been used for most of the scenes that take place in Ankara.

One of the scenes in Ankara was shot at the old Ankara Railway Station, the main historic train station of the city since its opening in 1892, which later on lost its popularity when a new train station opened in 2016, taking over most functions of its predecessor.

Films post-production started in October 2010 and lasted for 6 weeks until the end of November of that year. VFX and Sound Mixing was done in London, United Kingdom, with Point1Post, a U.K.-based post-production company.

During production, director Ömer Faruk Sorak informed lead actress Belçim Bilgin that they have finally picked the main filming house for her character Deniz in Ankara. Upon arriving at the filming location, Bilgin was shocked to see that the house they picked for filming was the house she grew up in. Bilgin states in the behind-the-scenes documentary that the director or any crew member did not have any prior knowledge about the whereabouts of her childhood house and that it was purely a coincidence for them to have selected that house.

== Plot ==
One September morning in 1977 in Ankara, a young man rushes his pregnant wife to the hospital for the impending birth. He crashes into another car, whose driver is another father-to-be. As a result of the accident, the woman in the car they hit gives birth prematurely, resulting in both babies being born on the same day at the same hospital. That accident becomes the first of many coincidences that will connect the fates of Özgür and Deniz, whose lives will continue to intersect throughout the rest of their childhood and teenage years in Ankara. Each time their paths intersect, the cause of the intersection greatly transforms both Özgür and Deniz's lives. However, their lives never fully intertwine because whatever it is that brings them together manages to build a wall between them until their next encounter, some 25 years on, in Istanbul.

== Cast ==
- Mehmet Günsur - Özgür
- Belçim Bilgin Erdoğan - Deniz
- Altan Erkekli - Yılmaz
- Şebnem Sönmez - Neriman
- Hüseyin Avni Danyal - Ömer
- Ayda Aksel- İnci
- Reyhan Asena Keskinci - Deniz (8 years old)
- Berkant Keskin - Özgür (8 years old)
- Doruk Kara - Ahmet
- Berna Konur- Zeynep
- Ümit Bülent Dinçer

== Music ==
The film has been widely praised for its usage of both modern and old Turkish music of the eras it depicts. While many of the film's soundtracks consist of popular Turkish music, the instrumental soundtracks have been composed by Ozan Çolakoğlu with additional music made by Özgür Buldum. The City of Prague Philharmonic Orchestra has performed the music, conducted by Adam Klemens.

The song "Eylül Akşamı" (September Evening), originally written by Turkish musicians Bülent Ortaçgil and Teoman, was performed by the main actor Mehmet Günsür for the film.

Some of the other memorable music from the film includes Aşk Tesadüfleri Sever (Love Likes Coincidences) by Müslüm Gürses which is the song that gave the film its name. Zaferlerim by Demir Demirkıran, Hoşçakal by Şebnem Ferah and Yine Yazı Bekleriz by TNK (band). Aşk Tesadüfleri Sever performed by Müslüm Gürses is a cover of Bjork's song Bachelorette.

== Release ==
The film opened on nationwide general release in 350 screens across Turkey on February 4, 2011 at number 1 in the national box office with a first-weekend gross of US$1,779,485.

== Remake ==
An Indian Telugu-language remake Iddari Lokam Okate was released in 2019.

== See also ==
- Turkish films of 2011
- 2011 in film
