= Nurism =

Islamic movement founded in Turkey

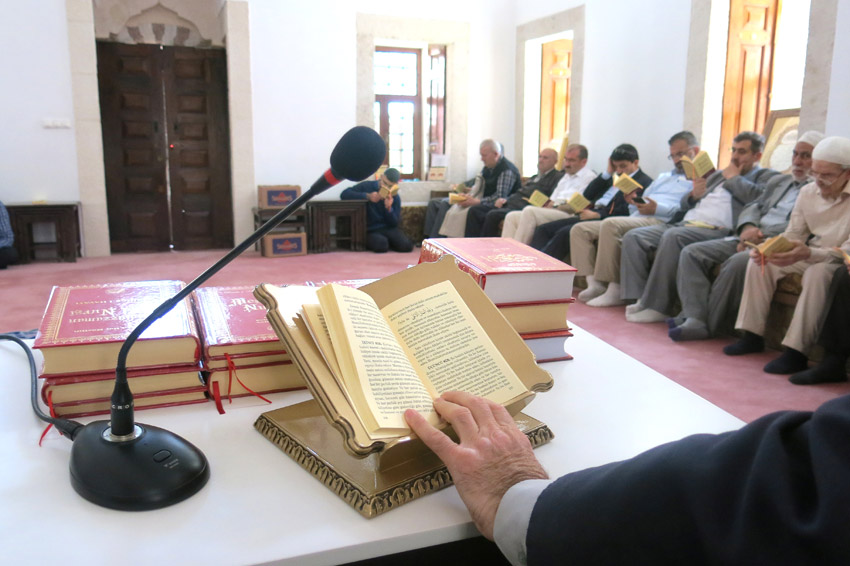
A study of Risale-i Nur books

Nurism or Nur Movement (Turkish: Nurculuk or Nur Cemaati) is a Sunni Islamic movement that was founded in Turkey in the early 20th century and based on the writings of Said Nursi (1877–1960). He emphasized the importance of salvation in both this life and the afterlife through education and freedom, the synthesis of Islam and science, and democracy as the best form of governance within the rule of law.

Through faith by inquiry instead of faith by imitation, Muslims would reject philosophies such as positivism, materialism and atheism emerging from the Western world at the time. His notion of sharia is twofold. Sharia applies to the voluntary actions of human beings and denotes the set of laws of nature. Both of them ultimately derive from one source, God. His works on the Quran in the Risale-i Nur were translated into almost all of the languages of Central Asia. The Nurcu Movement promotes the concept of the Quran as an eternal document, but one which needs to be continually reinterpreted. After Nursi’s death, several groups emerged from within the Nur Movement, including the Gülen movement, the Yeni Asya movement, the Publishers (Yazıcılar), and the Readers (Okuyucular).

The group was opposed by the government during the 1960s and 1970s. The group became substantially fragmented in the 1970s and 1980s.

In a 1999 academic publication, the Nurcu Movement was said to have between 2 and 6 million adherents.

After Said Nursi's death on March 23, 1960, many Nurist groups emerged as a result of differences of opinion on issues such as the understanding of governance, view of political events, ethnic origin, and service method. It was stated by Said Nursi that "people who are alleged to be hidden enemies" broke the unity of the Nurists.

In 2009, a number of people affiliated with the Nurist movement were arrested in Azerbaijan.
