= Muhammad Emin Er =

Shaykh Muhammad Emin Er
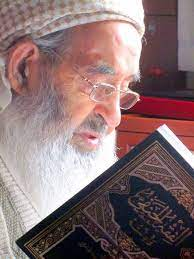

Personal life
- Born: c 1914
- Died: 2013

Religious life
- Religion: Islam
- Denomination: Sunni

Shaykh Muhammad Emin Er (c. 1914 – 27 June 2013) was an Islamic scholar trained in the Ottoman tradition who lived a life devoted to teaching and spirituality. He was born in the village of Kuluyan in the Ottoman province of Diyarbakır, and his family belonged to a Kurdish tribe called Miran.

Muhammad Emin was orphaned at the age of ten and spent his early life in difficult circumstances tending sheep on the mountainside. As a child, he had a passionate desire to learn how to read and write. He would carve words into stone with rocks, praying to God that he be given the ability to read the Quran.

At the age of about 25, after completing the hajj, Muhammad Emin set out in pursuit of religious learning across eastern Anatolia and, later, in Syria. He studied the traditional disciplines, including Arabic morphology (ṣarf), syntax (naḥw), logic (manṭiq), language theory (ʿilm al-waḍʿ), rhetoric (balāgha), rational theology (kalām), jurisprudence (fiqh), legal theory (uṣūl al-fiqh), Quran exegesis (tafsīr), prophetic traditions (uṣūl al-ḥadīth), memorizing by heart many of the main teaching texts of these sciences. He also devoted himself to the practice of spiritual purification with teachers from the Naqshbandi Sufi order and was known for maintaining a high level of character and palpable spiritual purpose. He met and studied with Bediüzzaman Nursi.

Shaykh Emin published a large number of books in Arabic. With a strong pedagogical vision, he focused on the basic disciplines within Arabic linguistics (such as morphology, syntax, and logic), but also wrote in more advanced disciplines (such as Islamic law, especially in relation to spiritual purification, or Sufism). He has stated that a major goal of his scholarship is to adapt the traditional religious sciences of Islam to present-day needs and concerns.

Shaykh Emin has made statements concerning the compatibility of Islamic thought with many of the fundamental teachings of the Judeo-Christian tradition, in particular that the rigorous emulation of the life of Muhammad necessarily leads the believer to the emulation of Jesus and Moses, who are regarded in Islam as central prophets.

Shaykh Emin's students include Mokhtar Maghraoui and Khalil Abdur-Rashid.
