= Mandıra Filozofu =

- Directed by: Müfit Can Saçıntı
- Written by: Birol Güven
- Produced by: Birol Güven
- Starring: Rasim Öztekin; Müfit Can Saçıntı; Eser Eyüboğlu; Ayda Aksel
- Edited by: Hasan Kalender
- Release date: 4 April 2014
- Running time: 90 minutes
- Language: Turkish

Mandıra Filozofu (English: Dairy Philosopher) is a 2014 Turkish ecology comedy film. The setting is mostly Çökertme village in Muğla Province.

== Plot ==
Cavit an ambitious industrialist in Istanbul plans to buy a beautiful sea side land in Muğla Province to build a boutique hotel. His wife further plans to change the natural scenery by demolishing a hill. The land belongs to the members of a village family. Most of the family members readily accept his offer. Among them Şükrü is the most enthusiastic for he needs money to marry. But Mustafaali, another owner, quite unlike his relatives, opposes selling the land. He is a philosopher and living far from the modern life amenities in his small and primitive cottage just like a Robinson Crusoe. He says he doesn't need money and he is happy in his wildlife environment. Cavit tries to persuade him. But in the end Mustafaali persuades Cavit to give up modern life. Cavit moves to a cottage of his own and begins to lead a life far from the stress of business and big city. Nevertheless, he financially helps Şükrü to marry.

== Cast ==
Character	Artist
Cavit	Rasim Öztekin
Mustafaali	Müfit Can Saçıntı
Şükrü	Eser Eyüboğlu
Güliz, Cavit's wife	Ayda Aksel
Selin, Güliz's friend	Ahu Sungur
Gülşah, Şükrü's sweetheart	Begüm Öner
Şükrü's friend	Hakan Bulut
Estate agent	Kemal Kuruçay
Mustafaali's mother	Gülnihal Demir

== Sequel ==
Müfit Can Saçıntı and Gülnihal Demir reprise their roles as Mustafa Ali and his mother in 2015's Mandıra Filozofu İstanbul.
