= Yeni Asya =

Turkish newspaper

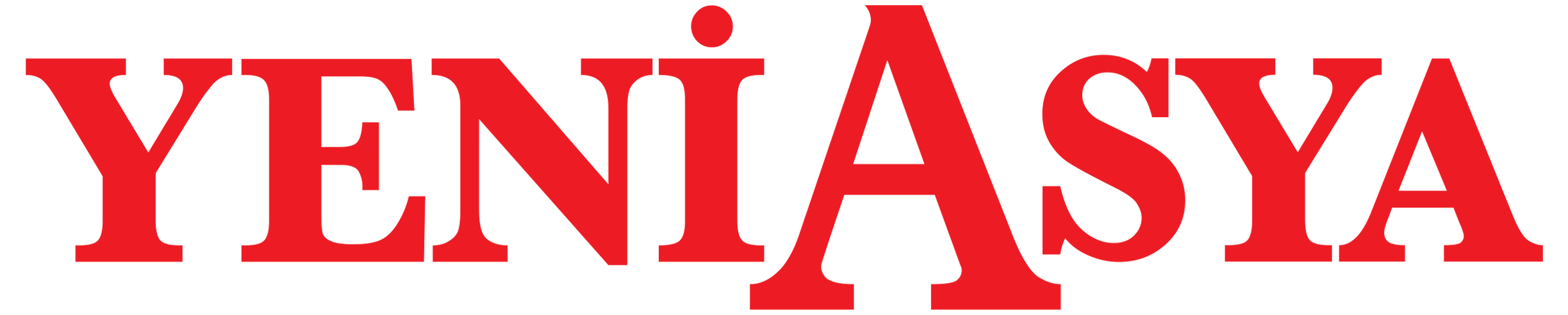
- Type: Daily newspaper and website
- Founded: 21 Feb 1970
- Political alignment: Islamism, Conservatism
- Language: Turkish
- Headquarters: Istanbul, Turkey
- Circulation: 52.130
- ISSN: 1301-7748
- Website: www.yeniasya.com.tr

Yeni Asya is a national newspaper published in Turkey. It is known as the publication organ of the Nur Movement. Under the emblem, there is a phrase of Said Nursi, "The key to the fortune of Asia is consultation and council".

== History ==
Yeni Asya founded by Mehmet Kutlular. It started its publication life as a weekly newspaper under the name Zülfikar, then continued to be published weekly under different names such as İhlas and İttihad. On February 21, 1970, he started his press life as a daily newspaper under the name of Yeni Asya. It was closed many times in its broadcasting life for various reasons. Between 1980 and 1984 alone, it was closed four times and changed three names; In this process, it takes the names Yeni Generation, Tasvir, Free Yurt and Yeni Asya. In 1990, his printing house and all his buildings throughout Turkey were confiscated. All staff are distributed. Having reached the zero point, the newspaper continues to be published with the same name, Yeni Asya, within a week.
