= Kolpaçino: Bomba =

- Theatrical release Poster
- Directed by: Şafak Sezer
- Written by: Şafak Sezer; Suat Özkan; Serkan Şengül; Kaan Ertem
- Produced by: Tayfun Topal
- Starring: Şafak Sezer; Aydemir Akbaş; Arzu Yanardağ; Ali Çatalbaş; Tuğba Melis Türk
- Cinematography: Kamil Çetin
- Edited by: Doğuş Onur Karasu
- Music by: İskender Paydaş
- Production company: Su Filmcilik
- Distributed by: Warner Bros. Pictures
- Release date: March 11, 2011
- Running time: 90 minutes
- Country: Turkey
- Language: Turkish
- Box office: US$4,156,398

Kolpaçino: Bomba is a 2011 Turkish comedy film, starring, co-written and directed by Şafak Sezer. The film, which opened on March 11, 2011 at number 1 in the Turkish box office, is a sequel to Kolpaçino (2009) and is one of the highest grossing Turkish films of 2011.

== Release ==
The film opened on nationwide general release in 400 screens across Turkey on March 11, 2011 at number 1 in the national box office with a first weekend gross of US$1,056,631.

== See also ==
- Turkish films of 2011
- 2011 in film
