= Fall Down Dead =

- Directed by: Jon Keeyes
- Written by: Roy Sallows
- Produced by: Brandon Baker; Ron Gell; Nesim Hason
- Starring: Dominique Swain; Mehmet Günsür; Udo Kier; David Carradine
- Cinematography: Richard Clabaugh
- Edited by: Robert J. Castaldo
- Music by: Pinar Toprak
- Distributed by: Image Entertainment; New Films International
- Release date: 2007
- Running time: 90 minutes
- Language: English

Fall Down Dead is a slasher film released in 2007 starring Dominique Swain and Udo Kier. The storyline involves a metropolitan city in the grip of fear after rolling blackouts bring out a serial killer dubbed "The Picasso Killer".

== Plot ==
One night, in the middle of a blackout, seven strangers trapped in an office building are targeted by the killer as he seeks out the one who has seen his face.

== Cast ==
- Dominique Swain - Christie Wallace
- Mehmet Günsür - Detective Stefan Kercheck (credited as Mehmet Gunsur)
- Udo Kier - Picasso Killer / Aaron Garvey
- David Carradine - Wade Douglas (security guard)
- R. Keith Harris - Detective Lawrence Kellog

== Reception ==
Fall Down Dead has a 0% on Rotten Tomatoes based on 7 reviews, with an average rating of 1.96/10.

Luke Y. Thompson, writing for Music Hall (syndicated in LA Weekly) said "...if this movie receives any notoriety at all, it will likely be for the fact that Carradine's character meets his demise in a manner that's uncomfortably similar to real life."
