= TNK (band) =

Turkish band

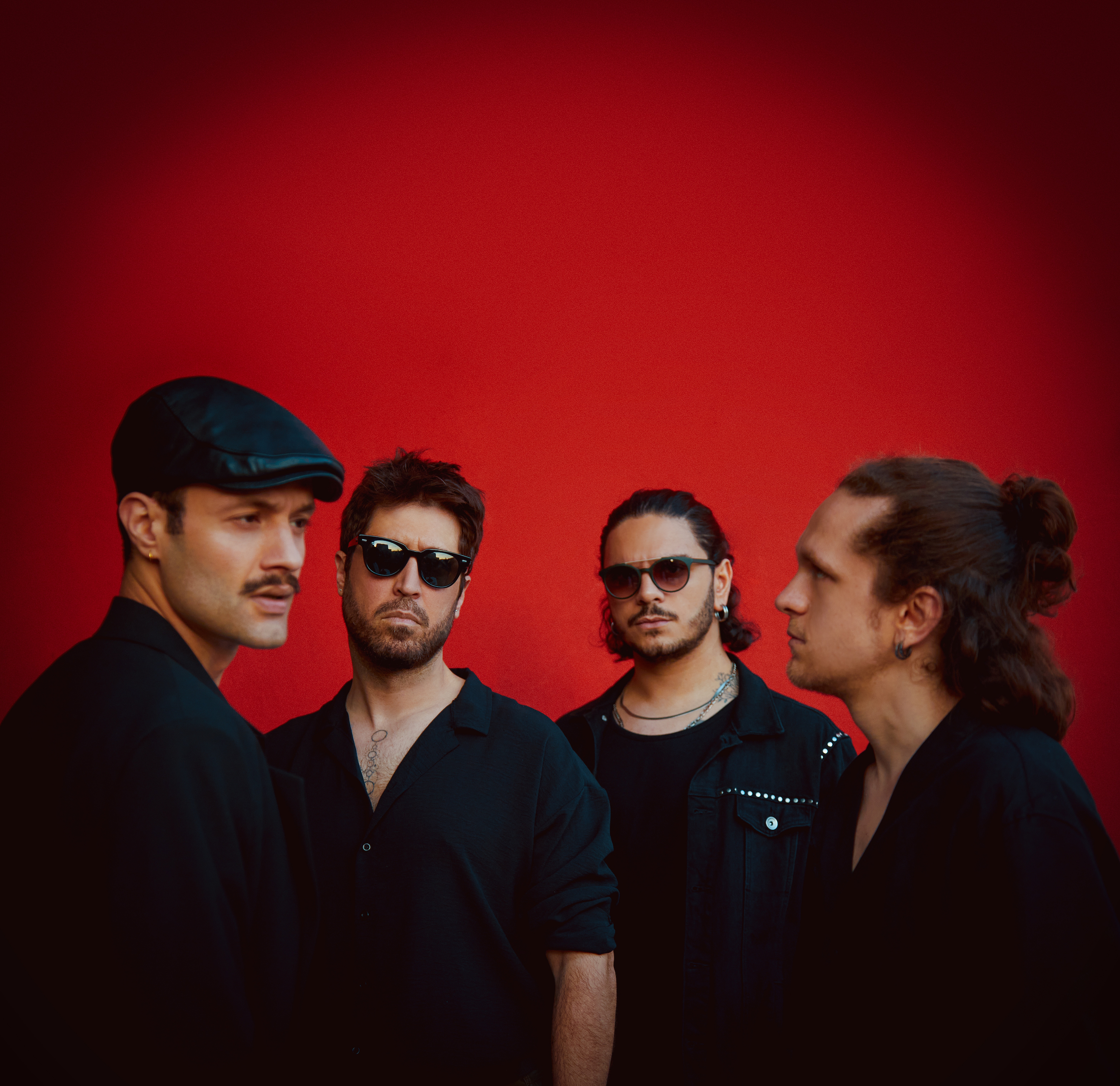

Background information
- Origin: Ankara, Turkey
- Genres: Alternative rock, indie rock, pop rock
- Years active: 2001 – present
- Label: Pasaj Müzik
- Members: Caner Karamukluoğlu – vocals, guitar, keyboards Umut Er – guitar, keyboards, backing vocals Hüseyin Deniz – bass guitar
- Past members: Özgür Aksüyek; Basri Hayran; Onur Ertem; Hasan Güleç
- Website: official site

TNK is a Turkish band from Ankara.

== Band history ==
TNK was formed in Ankara in 2001 and first gained attention at the 2002 SingYourSong contest. In 2004, they won a jury award during a Fanta young talent search. In 2005, they released their first EP titled Sıra Bizde from which they released the song Elveda De as a video. TNK signed up with Pasaj Müzik in 2009 and worked for 11 months on a new album. The result was Söyle Ruhum which was released with the song of the same released as a music video.

In July 2010, they went on tour with Ceza and Şebnem Ferah playing in 16 cities to hundreds of thousands of people. In September, they released the song Dans Et as a music video. They contributed the song Yine Yazı Bekleriz to the soundtrack of the film Aşk Tesadüfleri Sever directed by Ömer Faruk Sorak. They also performed the song Eylül Akşamı with Mehmet Günsür and Bülent Ortaçgil on the soundtrack. TNK collaborated with Nilüfer on the song Selam Söyle which appeared on her album 12 duet.

== Discography ==
- Söyle Ruhum (2010)
- Melankoli (2013)
- Kanatlarımdan Tutma (2019)
- Manik Depresif (2020)
