= Risale-i Nur =

Commentary on the Qu'ran

Risale-i Nur Collection
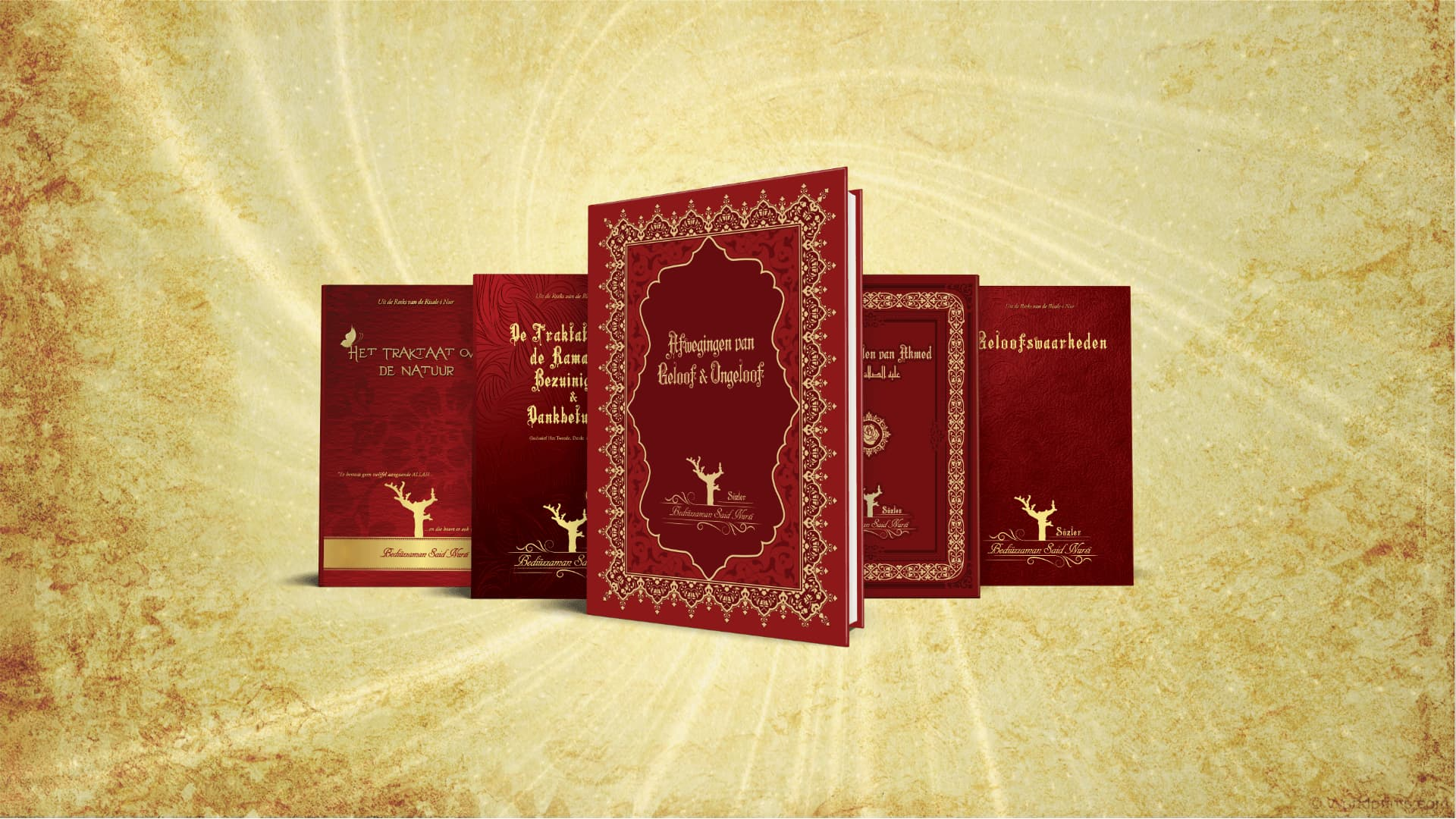
- Dutch translation of the Risale-i Nur Collection
- Author: Said Nursi
- Original title: Risale-i Nur Külliyatı
- Language: Ottoman Turkish, Arabic
- Genre: Tafsir
- Publication date: 1910's- 1950's
- Publication place: Turkey
- Media type: Print (hardcover), Print (paperback)
- Pages: 6000

The Risale-i Nur Collection (Turkish: Risale-i Nur Külliyatı, Ottoman Turkish: رساله نور كلیاتی) is a collection of religious writings by Said Nursî, a Kurdish Islamic scholar from the Bitlis region of Turkey, which were composed between the 1910s and 1950s. Unlike classic tafsirs (commentaries on the Qur'an), the Risale-i Nur doesn't sequentially explain the linguistics, vocabulary, or jurisprudence of the Qur'anic text verse by verse, but instead focuses on proving and explaining the fundamental truths of faith (iman) within the verses of the Qur'an, using logical and rational arguments, topic by topic.

Risale-i Nur collection was penned amid the transition between late Ottoman Empire and establishment of new Turkish Republic. During this time period, a series of strong oppressive regulations had been put in place, such as the ban of all religious practices in their original Arabic form throughout the country, prohibiting the citizens from wearing religious dressing and refuters receiving punishment in form of death penalty. During the time period Risale-i Nur collection was publicized, measures against its circulation had been taken. The books include an analysis of Islamic sources and a reinterpretation of the text for the "mentality" of Said Nursi's age. However, it is not solely an exegesis, as it includes reflections and details about Said Nursi's own life and interpretations.

== Distinctive features of the collection ==
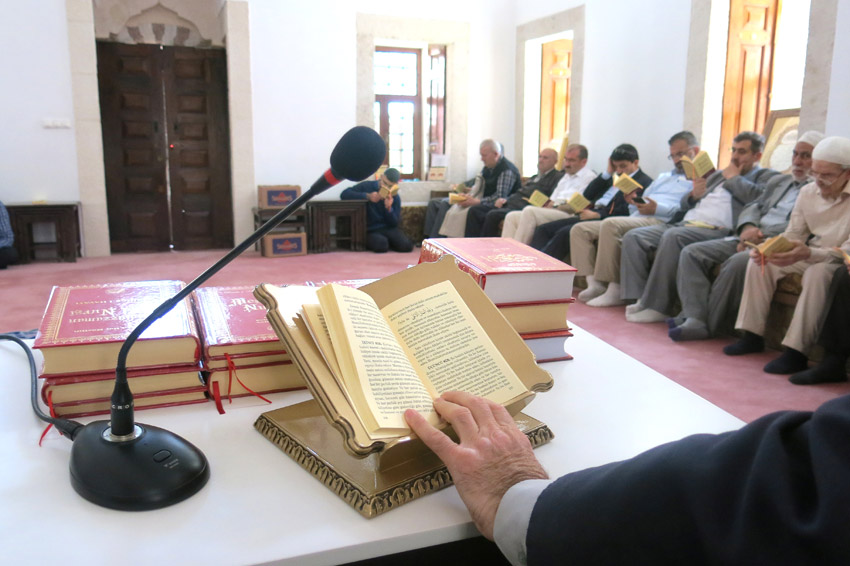
A study of the Risale-i Nur

With these writings, Said Nursî claimed to open up a new, direct way to reality (haqiqat) and knowledge of God which he described as the highway of the Qur'an and way of the companions of Muhammad through the "legacy of prophethood", which gains for those who follow it "true and certain belief". Said Nursi did not ascribe the writings to himself, but claimed that they "proceeded from the Qur'an itself" like "rays shining out of from [its] truths".

Thus, rather than being a Qur'anic commentary which expounds all its verses giving the immediate reasons for their revelation and the apparent meanings of the words and sentences, the Risale-i Nur is what is known as a mânevî tefsir, or commentary which expounds the meaning of the Qur'anic truths. The verses expounded in the Risale-i Nur are mostly those concerned with the truths of belief, such as the Divine Names and attributes and the Divine activity in the universe, the Divine existence and Oneness, resurrection, prophethood, Divine Determining or destiny, and man's duties of worship. Nursî explains how the Qur'an addresses all men in every age in accordance with the degree of their understanding and development; it has a face that looks to each age.

According to Nursî, the Qur'an invites man to observe the universe and reflect on the Divine activity within it; following this method, Nursî claims proofs and explanations for the truths of belief. He likens the universe to a book, and looking at it in the way shown by the Qur'an, that is, 'reading' it for its meaning, learns of the Divine Names and attributes and other truths of belief. The book's purpose is to describe its Author and Maker; beings become evidences and signs to their Creator. Thus, an important element in the way of the Risale-i Nur is reflection or contemplation (tefekkür), 'reading' the Book of the Universe in order to increase in knowledge of God and to obtain 'true and certain belief' in all the truths of belief. Nursî attempts to demonstrate that the fundamentals of Islam, such as Divine Oneness, arrived at in this way are the only rational and logical explanation of the universe, and criticizes Naturalist and Materialist philosophy which have used science's findings about the universe to deny those truths.

Also, following this method, in the Risale-i Nur, Nursî dealt with many mysteries of religion, such as bodily resurrection and Divine Determining and man's will, and the riddle of the constant activity in the universe and the motion of particles, before which man relying on his own intellect and philosophy had been impotent.

== History ==
While in Barla, Nursî compiled the treatise on Resurrection and the pieces that followed it together in the form of a collection and which he named Sözler ("The Words"). Sözler was followed by Mektubat (Letters), a collection of thirty-three letters of varying lengths from Nursî to his students. This was followed by Lem'alar (The Flashes Collection) and Şualar (The Rays), which was completed in 1949. Together with these are the three collections of Additional Letters, each for one of Nursî's main places of exile: Barla Lahikası, Kastamonu Lahikası, and Emirdağ Lahikası. During the production of the Risale-i Nur Nursî would dictate at speed to a scribe, who would write down the piece in question with equal speed. Nursî had no books for reference and the writing of religious works was forbidden. They were all written therefore in the mountains and out in the countryside. Handwritten copies were then made, and these were secretly copied out in the houses of the Risale-i Nur 'students', as they were called, and passed from village to village, and then from town to town, until they spread throughout Turkey. Only in 1946 were Risale-i Nur students able to obtain duplicating machines, while it was not till 1956 that various parts were printed on modern presses in the new, Latin, script. The figure given for hand-written copies is 600,000. It may be seen from the above figure how the Risale-i Nur Movement spread within Turkey, despite all efforts to stop it. After 1950, the period of what Nursî called 'the Third Said', there was a great increase in the number of students, particularly among the young and those who had been through the secular education system of the Republic. At the same time the number of students outside Turkey increased.

== Main volumes (translated into English) ==
=== The Words (Sözler) ===
The Words is the first volume of the Risale-i Nur and consist of thirty-three independent parts or "Words", which explain and prove the fundamentals of Belief, including its myriad virtues and advantages. Included here are exposition of the Divine Names and Attributes in creation, the resurrection of the dead and the Hereafter, Prophethood and the Ascension, the Miraculousness of the Qur'an, the angels, the immortality of man's soul, Divine Determining (fate or destiny), together with discussion on the true nature of man and the universe, The wisdom of the specified times of the five daily prayers, and man's fundamental and innate need to worship Allah. This work responds to the attacks against the Qur'an in the name of science and philosophy, and attempts to demonstrate the rationality of belief in Allah.

=== The Letters (Mektûbat) ===
This second volume of the Risale-i Nur demonstrates the relationship between Nursî and his students. In this Collection, Said Nursi replied to numerous and diverse questions posed by the students. Therefore, the Letters cover a lot of different subjects. For example, how death is a bounty; where Hell is situated; (The Letters 2004, p. 21-29). how the metaphorical love for individuals or for this world can be transformed into true love; (The Letters 2004, p. 28) explanation of where the Great Gathering and Last Judgement will take place; (The Letters 2004, p. 57) a letter of condolence on the death of a child;The Letters 2004, p. 100) the proof for prophethood of Muhammad; (The Letters 2004, p. 236) calling upon children to be kind to their parents; (The Letters 2004, p. 308) calling upon believers to brotherhood and love and pointing out effective ways of preventing enmity against a believer; (The Letters 2004, p. 311) the best way in which believers can pray for each other; (The Letters 2004, p. 330) the importance of supplication (The Letters 2004, p. 353) and the numerous Qur'anic commands to offer thanks; (The Letters 2004, p. 428) the reality and benefits of true dreams. (The Letters 2004, p. 407) Moreover, The Letters provide answers to many questions of Belief and Islam; they contain explanations of the truths of Iman and the mysteries of the Qur'an which also illustrate the Qur'anic way of Knowledge of Allah manifested by the Risale-i Nur. For instance, Said Nursi explained some of the instances of wisdom in the fast of the month of Ramadan (The Letters 2004, p. 466) and he offers important guidance to contemporary Muslims concerning issues ranging from nationalism (The Letters 2004, p. 379, 491) to Sufism. (The Letters 2004, p. 518) This collection includes the famous Nineteenth Letter which describes more than three hundred of the miracles of Muhammad. Even though this letter includes many hadiths and is more than a hundred pages in length based on traditions and narrations, it was written completely from memory without referring to any book “in a few days by working two or three hours every day, for a total of twelve hours”. (The Letters 2004, p. 116) The Letters also shed light on Nursî's own life in his numerous years of exile and the conditions during the early years of the Turkish Republic. (The Letters 2004, p. 83)

=== The Flashes (Lem'alar) ===
The Flashes Collection starts with 2 supplications- the supplication of the prophet Yunus showing its relevance for everyone today; and the supplication of the prophet Ayub providing a remedy for all those who are afflicted by disaster. Like the first two volumes this Collection deals very compellingly with a number of diverse subjects. The primary purpose of the topics is aimed at expounding the various Qur'anic verses and its teachings concerning the fundamentals of Belief in a way that addresses modern man's understanding and is relevant to his needs. Some of the subjects discussed include seven predictions concerning the Unseen in the three final verses of Surah al-Fath; "The highway of the practices of the Prophet and antidote for the sickness of innovations"; the meaning of the phrase "I seek refuge from Satan the Accursed"; the reality of those things that captivate the human soul, and through severing attachment to them turns man's face to eternity; the Qur'anic principle of humility; Allah has included in all activity and striving a reward and pleasure; a supplication that illustrates the meaning of the Hadith "Die before you die"; On Frugality; On Sincerity- including the four rules for gaining and preserving sincerity; On Nature; Four instances of wisdom of the Qur'anic injunction about the veiling of women, and a compelling and convincing discussion detailing the ways in which happiness of women in both worlds may be preserved by adhering to Islamic principles and practices; Message for the Sick; Treatise for the Elderly; On the Six Divine Names of Allah bearing the Greatest Name.

=== The Rays (Şuâlar) ===
The Rays Collection contains some of the key sections of the Risale-i Nur. Among these are: The Supreme Sign, which describes the testimony articulated by all the realms of creation to Allah's Necessary Existence and Oneness. Further explanations and proofs of Divine Oneness, based also on recognizing and 'reading' the manifestations of Allah in the universe are set out in the Second, Third, and Fourth Rays in this book. While in addition to these questions (i) The Fruits of Belief - One hour per day is sufficient for the five obligatory prayers; The truth of death; true, pain-free pleasure is found only in belief in Allah, and is possible only through such Belief; A number of benefits of believing in the Hereafter which look to man's individual and social life; A reply to objections raised about repetitions in the Qur'an; The fruits tasted in this world of belief in the angels. and (ii) The Shining Proof-Seeking knowledge of the Creator through His Attributes, knowledge, will and power put forward clear, proofs of the main 'pillars of belief'. Also included in this volume are parts of Nursî's defense speeches in the Courts of Denizli and Afyon, and the short letters and notes he wrote to his fellow-prisoners (his students) while incarcerated. As well as advising them about their defenses and directing the continuing work of the Risale-i Nur, essentially these letters were written to guide, encourage, and comfort his students during their ordeals, to remind them to be cautious in the face of their enemies and above all to maintain their solidarity and to strengthen their brotherly relations.

=== Signs of Miraculousness (İşârât-ül İ'caz) ===
This book is a concise commentary on (i) Surah al•Fatiha- The aims of the Qur'an; Peace); About Paradise; About Life, Death and the Resurrection of the Dead; The teaching of the Names. Its aim is to expound the Miraculous nature of the Qur'an's word order. For "the embroideries" of the positioning and arrangement of the Qur'an's words demonstrate one aspect of its Miraculousness. Nursî was intent on demonstrating the conformity of the Qur'an with reason and the modern physical sciences. In this way, he replied both to questions and doubts that arose in the face of scientific advances, and to demonstrate that, as the revealed Word of Allah, the Qur'an has ever continuing relevance in contemporary life. Thus, though composed in the early period of Said Nursi's life, under trying conditions in 1913-14, this book contains in concise form, the ideas and truths that he subsequently elaborated in the Risale-i Nur.

=== The Staff of Moses (Asa-yı Musa) ===
This book consists of three parts in its original. Part One comprises 'The Fruits of Belief that discusses numerous aspects- One hour per day is sufficient for the five obligatory prayers; Death is a source of anxiety for man; true, pain-free pleasure is found only in belief in Allah, and is possible only through such Belief; The necessity of spending one's youth chastely and on the straight path; The sciences make known the Glorious Creator of the universe with His Names, Attributes and perfections; The truths and proofs about the existence of the Hereafter from Our Sustainer, our Prophet Muhammad (Upon Whom be Blessings and Peace), the other Prophets and earlier Scriptures, the Qur'an, the angels and then the universe.; There are a number of benefits of Believing in the Hereafter that look to man's individual and social life; It is impossible to separate the pillars of Belief as each proves all of them, requires them, and necessitates them; A Flower of Emirdag - An extremely powerful reply to objections raised about repetitions in the Qur'an; The fruits tasted in this world of belief in the angels Part Two comprises 'A Decisive Proof of Allah' and consists of eleven proofs of the truths of Iman. In the words of Nursî: "just as the staff of Prophet Musa (Upon whom Be Peace) caused twelve springs to gush forth and was the means of eleven miracles, so the present collection (The Staff of Moses) consists of the eleven light-scattering topics of 'The Fruits of Belief', and the eleven certain proofs of 'The Decisive Proof of Allah' ".

1. The Epitomes of Light (Mesnevî-i Nuriye)
2. Reasonings (Muhâkemât)

== Booklets ==
1. The Damascus Sermon (Hutbe-i Şâmiye)
2. Fruits of Belief (Meyve Risalesi)
3. A Guide for Youth (Gençlik Rehberi)
4. The Islamic Unity (İttihad-ı İslam)

== Others (not translated) ==
1. "Barla Lahikası" The Barla Epistles
2. "Kastamonu Lahikası" The Kastamonu Epistles
3. "Emirdağ Lahikası" The Emirdağ Epistles
4. "Sikke-i Tasdik-i Gaybî" The Hidden Seal of Approval
5. "Âsâr-ı Bedîiyye" The Exceptional Pieces
6. "İman ve Küfür Muvâzeneleri" The Comparisons of Faith and Disbelief
7. "Münâzarat" The Disputations
8. "Nur Çeşmesi" The Fountain of Light
9. "Sünûhât - Tulûât - İşârât" Insights-Inspirations-Associations
10. "Nur Âleminin Bir Anahtarı" A Key to World of Light
11. "Dîvan-ı Harb-i Örfî" Court Martial (a defense speech at)
12. "Nurun İlk Kapısı" The First Door to Light
13. "Hizmet Rehberi" A Guide to the Service
14. "Fihrist" The Digest

== See also ==
- Said Nursi
- Nur Movement
