= Rüstem Pasha Medrese =

Madrasa in Fatih, Istanbul, Turkey

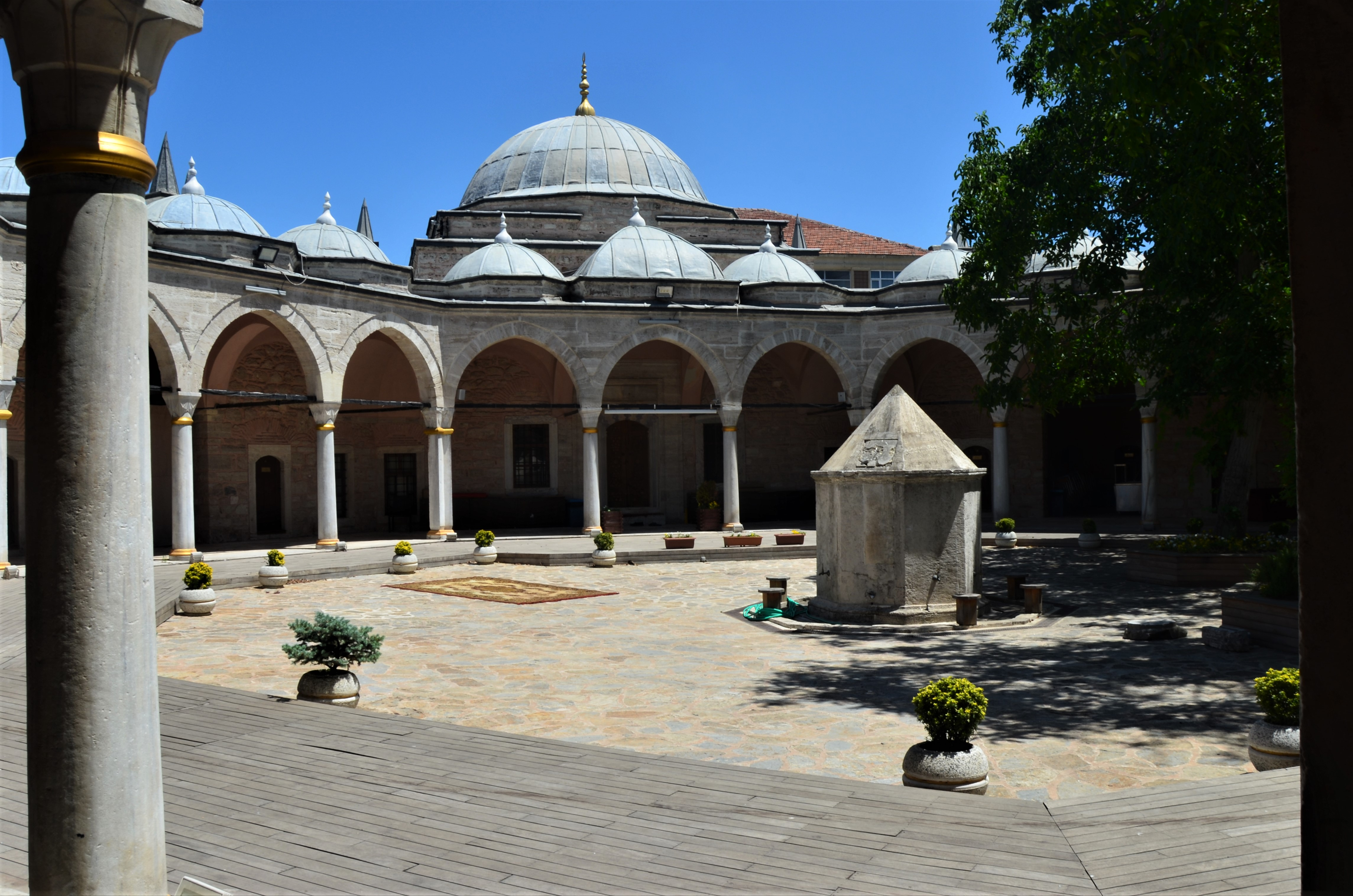
- View of the courtyard with şadırvan

- Location of Rüstem Pasha Medrese in Fatih district, Istanbul, Turkey.

Religion
- Affiliation: Islam
- District: Fatih
- Province: Istanbul

Location
- Location: Fatih, Istanbul, Turkey
- Interactive map of Rüstem Pasha Medrese
- Coordinates: 41°00′47.4″N 28°58′20.8″E

Architecture
- Architect: Mimar Sinan
- Type: Medrese
- Style: Ottoman architecture
- Completed: 1551; 475 years ago

Specifications
- Length: 43 m (141 ft)
- Width: 42 m (138 ft)
- Materials: ashlar, brick

Rüstem Pasha Medrese (Turkish: Rüstem Paşa Medresesi) is a former medrese, located in Fatih district of Istanbul, Turkey. It was commissioned by Ottoman statesman and grand vizier Rüstem Pasha, and built by court architect Mimar Sinan in 1551.

== History ==
Rüstem Pasha Medrese is situated at Rüstempaşa Street 34 in Sururi neighborhood of Fatih district in old Istanbul. It was commissioned by Ottoman statesman and grand vizier Rüstem Pasha (c. 1500–1561). It was built by the court architect Mimar Sinan (c. 1488/1490-1588), and completed in 1550–1551.

The building was used as a madrasa, an institution for religious education, until 1869. It was occupied by the victims of the 1918 fire. During the Republican Era (after 1923), the building served in the beginning as orphanage, and after 1966 as dormitory for university students. From 1987 on, it has been used by the local Social Assistance and Solidarity Foundation of Eminönü.

The building's facades suffered damage by atmospheric effects, fires around it and waste water caused by blocked sewage system. Restoration work, which began in 2006, was completed in 2011.

== Bediüzzaman Museum ==
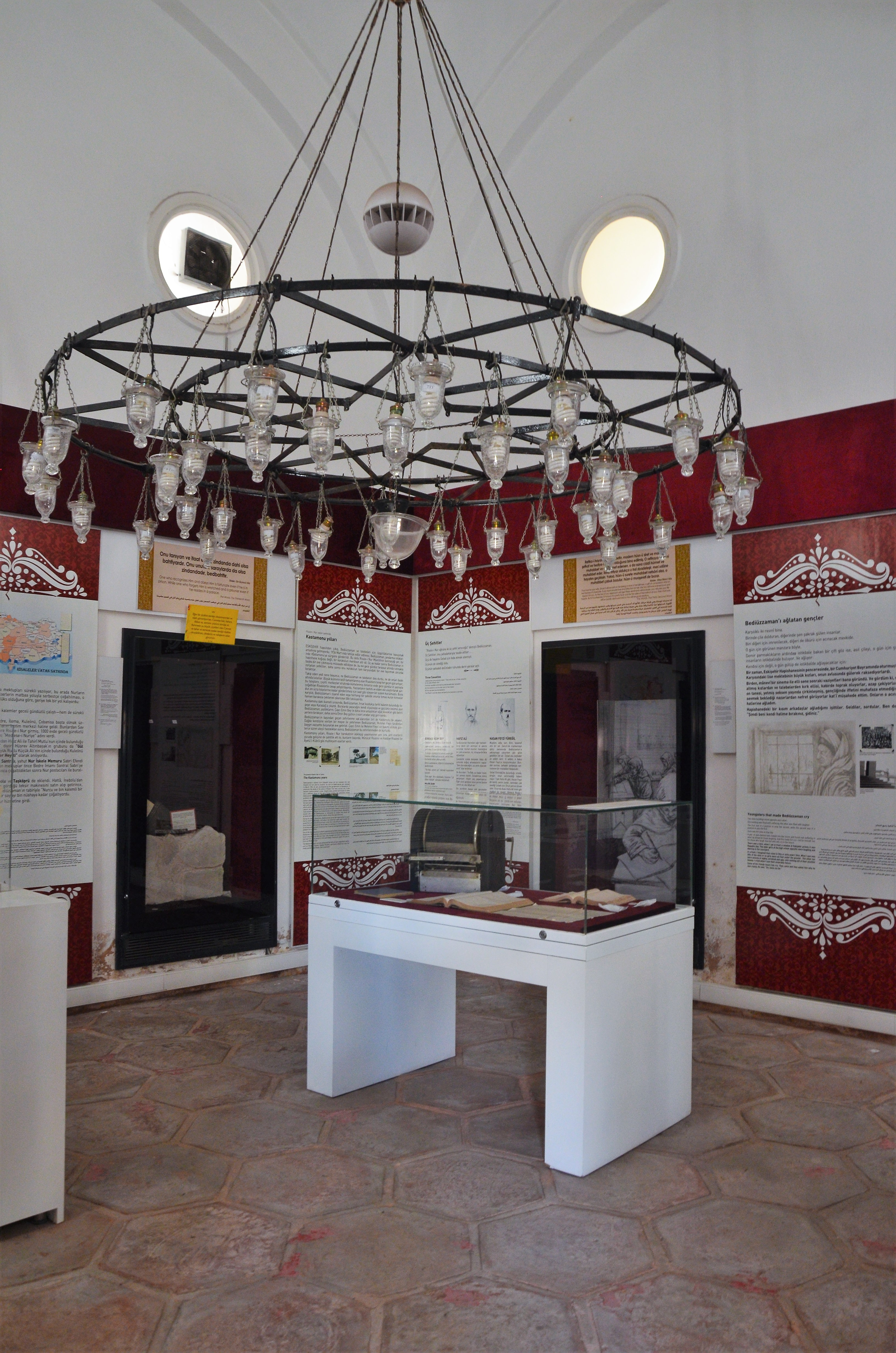
A view from the Bediüzzaman Museum inside the Rüstem Pasha Medrese.

In October 2012, Bediüzzaman Museum (Turkish: Bediüzzaman Said Nursi ve Risale-i Nur Müzesi) was established inside the medrese building occupying two chambers, one of which is a former cell-like student room. It is dedicated to the life and work of the Kurdish Sunni Muslim theologian Said Nursî (1877–1960).

== Architecture ==
It is constructed on a hillside down to the Golden Horn over a platform raised above the ground to the north. The northeastern wall of the medrese building is about 7.50 m (24.6 ft) back from the supporting wall of the platform in the north.

It is designed in an octagonal courtyard inside a quasi-square plan. Mimar Sinan repeated the octagonal design after the Kapı Ağa Medrese (built 1488) in Amasya, differing from the original in the square-plan outer walls, which measure 42 m × 43 m (138 ft × 141 ft) in length. It is built of ashlar and bricks. Entrance to the medrese's central courtyard is through an arch gate in the middle of the southeastern wing. In the center of the courtyard a shadirvan with pyramid-like roof is situated. The courtyard is surrounded by a colonnaded gallery with 24 marble columns and covered by 24 domes; 16 columns are round while 8 columns standing at the corners of the octagonal colonnade are polygonal. Around this gallery in turn are 22 student rooms and classrooms covered by domes. The student rooms are cell-like while the classrooms are relative bigger chambers. The chambers are one step higher than the gallery floor and are entered by a flat-arch door. The student room interiors have barred windows facing to the courtyard and arched niches. The domes of the rooms are connected at the interior by vaulted muqarnas. At the middle of the southeastern facade is a mihrab which was added in a later time. A two-story annex with a big dome is situated at the southeastern side of the medrese. It has two rectangular barred windows in the ground floor and three arched windows on the floor above. It is believed that the chamber at the southern corner was a bath or a kitchen due to its different type of roof.

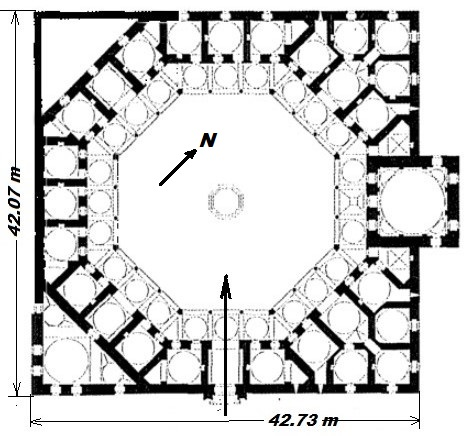
Floor plan of Rüstem Pasha Medrese

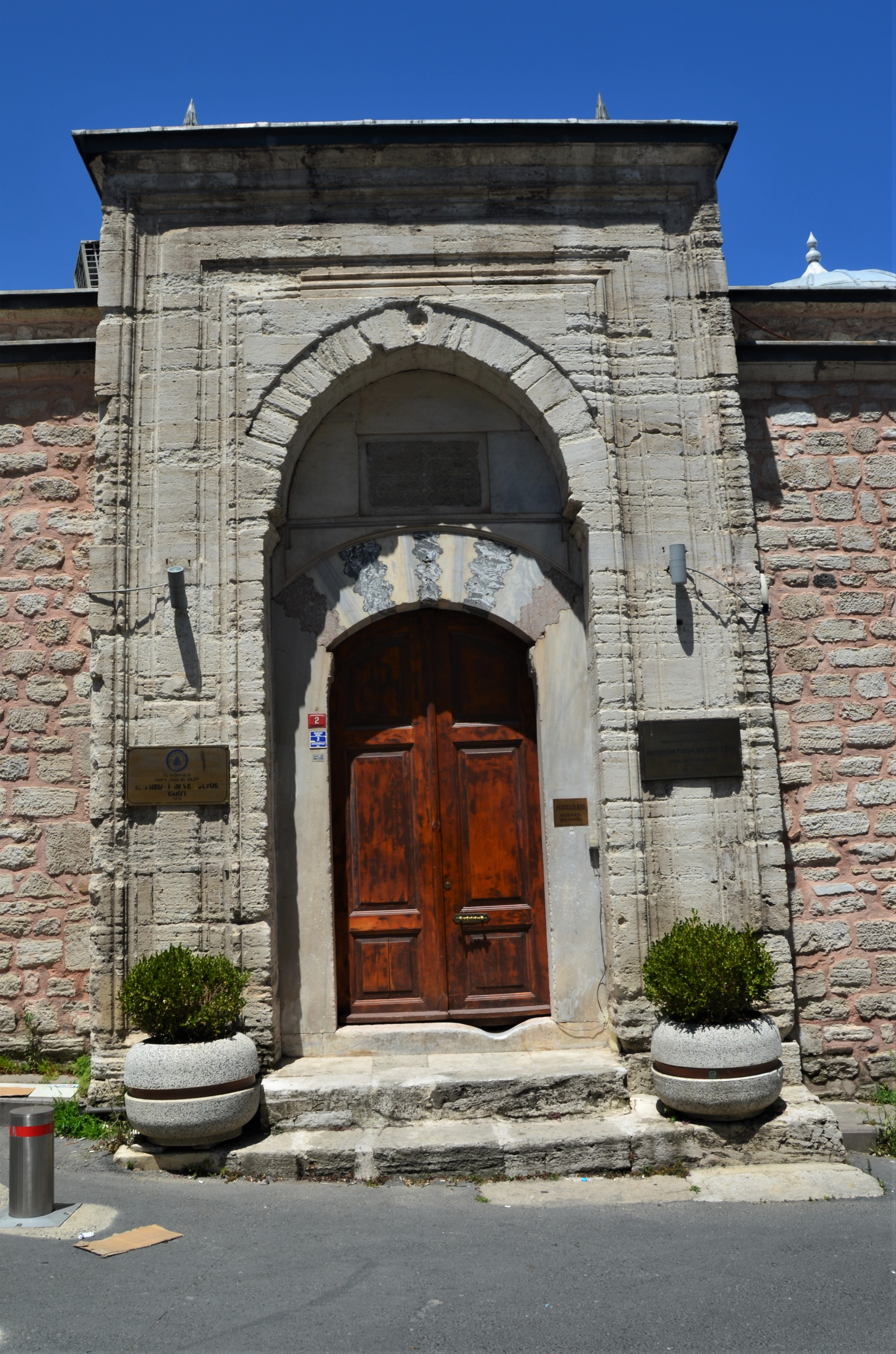
The entrance to the medrese

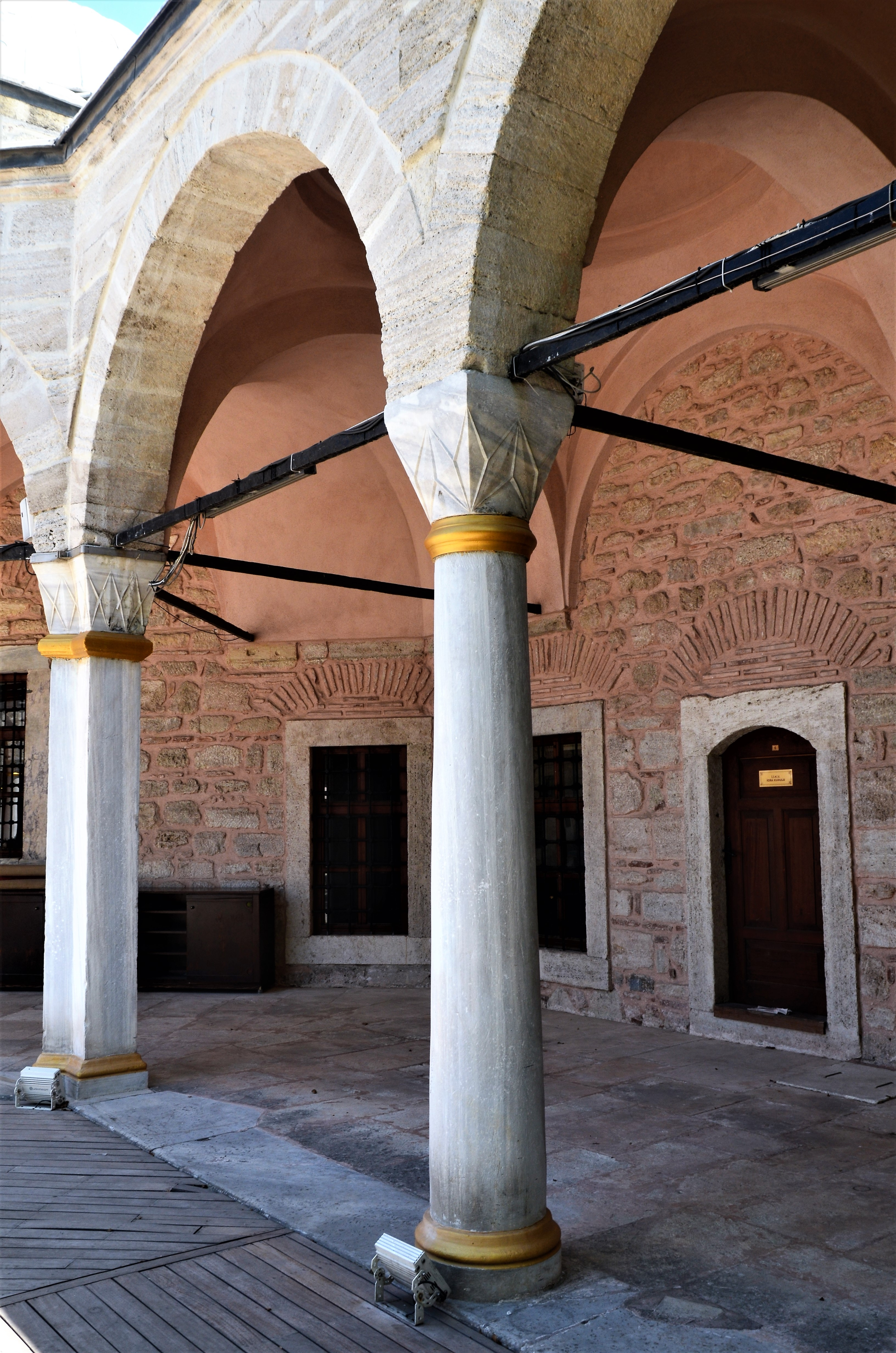
A round column (mid) and a polygonal column (left) of the courtyard's colonnad
