= Batuhan Karacakaya =

Turkish television actor (born 1997)

- Born: 5 February 1997 (age 28); Istanbul, Turkey
- Occupation: Actor
- Years active: 2005–present
- Known for: Diriliş: Ertuğrul as Dündar Bey

Batuhan Karacakaya (born 5 February 1997) is a Turkish television actor. He is best known as Dündar Bey in the Turkish historical TV show Diriliş: Ertuğrul. Karacakaya played "Bülent Ziyagil" in the television series Aşk-ı Memnu between 2008 and 2010.

== Filmography ==
Film
Year	Title	Role	Notes
2010	Dersimiz: Atatürk	Mert	Leading role
2010	Bekle Beni	Salih	Leading role
2011	Aşk Tesadüfleri Sever	Özgür	Leading role
2012	Uzun Hikâye	Mustafa	Leading role
Television
Year	Title	Role	Notes
2005	Büyük Buluşma	Tunç	Guest appearance
2006 / 2008	Beşinci Boyut	Arif, Emre (Şeytan)	Guest appearance
2007–2008	Bıçak Sırtı	Murat Ertuğrul	Supporting role
2008–2010	Aşk-ı Memnu	Bülent Ziyagil	Supporting role
2011	Sen de Gitme	Selim	Guest appearance
2011–2012	Umutsuz Ev Kadınları	Mert Günsu	Supporting role
2016–2017	Diriliş Ertuğrul	Dündar Bey	Supporting role
Contests
Year	Title	Role	Notes
2021	Survivor 2021	Himself	7th place
2022	Survivor 2022: All Star	Himself	3rd place
