= Mandıra Filozofu İstanbul =

- Directed by: Müfit Can Saçıntı
- Written by: Birol Guven
- Produced by: Birol Güven
- Starring: Müfit Can Saçıntı
- Music by: Burcu Güven, Aydın Sarman
- Release date: March 13, 2015
- Running time: 90 minutes
- Language: Turkish

Mandıra Filozofu İstanbul (English: Dairy Philosopher Istanbul) is a 2015 Turkish comedy film.

== Cast ==
Character	Artist
Mustafaali	Müfit Can Saçıntı
Halil Ibrahim	Ugur Alibasoglu
Human Resources Personnel	Mehmet Auf
Elizabeth	Zinaida Chistol
Gulfidan	Gulnihal Demir
Ozlem	Nihan Durukan
Hilmi	Alper Düzen
Boss	Birol Güven

== See also ==
- Mandıra Filozofu
