= Mehmet Tanrısever =

Turkish filmmaker and businessman (born 1953)

- Born: 1 January 1953 (age 73); Konya, Turkey
- Occupation: Filmmaker/businessman
- Years active: 1989–present

Mehmet Tanrısever (born 1953 in Konya, Turkey) is a Turkish filmmaker and businessman, who is best known as the founder of Feza Film, which produced his films Abdullah from Minye (1989), The Exile (1992) and Free Man (2011).

== Biography ==
Originally an industrialist by profession, Mehmet Tanrısever became a producer in 1989 with the establishment of Feza Film, stating that, "I first started filmmaking because I wanted to express an idea". When Abdullah from Minye (1989), the first film he produced, broke box-office records, he was compelled to make the move into directing. The Exile (1992), his debut as director, won 'Second Best Film' at the 45th International Salerno Film Festival and the 11th Tashkent International Film Festival, where he also won the Silver Phoenix and 'Best Debut Director' awards.

Following this, he took a break from filmmaking, stating that, "My industrial life was kind of hectic, but I was never detached from movies. There was always this gnawing feeling inside of me. After seeing movies with audiences of 3 to 4 million in recent years, I started getting upset with myself, wondering why conservative people can't make good movies. So, I liquidated my business and spent time making movies". He returned to the screens as co-writer, producer and director of Free Man (2011).

He is married with 3 children.

== Filmography ==
Films
Year	Title	Credited as			Notes
Year	Title	director	Producer	screenWriter	Notes
1989	Abdullah from Minye (Turkish: Minyeli Abdullah)			Yes	
1992	The Exile (Turkish: Sürgün)	Yes	Yes	Yes	
2011	Free Man (Turkish: Hür Adam)	Yes	Yes	Yes	
