= Ayda Aksel =

Turkish actress

- Born: 31 October 1962 (age 63); Istanbul, Turkey
- Occupation: Actress
- Years active: 1980–present
- Spouses: Halûk Semi Yüngül (m. 1984; div. 1993) Atilla Akıncıoğlu (m. 1995; died 2010)
- Children: 2

Ayda Aksel (born 31 October 1962) is a Turkish actress.

She studied theatre at Mimar Sinan University. While studying at primary school, she learned ballet and cello at conservatory. Aside from her career as an actress, Aksel voiced various commercials. She worked for the Turkish State Theatres for 15 years. She also briefly joined the Sadri Alışık Theatre.

== Theatre ==
- Angel on My Shoulder : Stephan Levi - Istanbul State Theatre - 2007
- Yarım Bardak Su : Tarık Ginersel - Istanbul State Theatre - 2004
- Dead Guilty : Richard Harris - Istanbul State Theatre - 2002
- Private Lives : Noël Coward - Istanbul State Theatre - 2000
- Karşı Penceredeki Kadın : Yavuz Özkan - Sadri Alışık Theatre - 1998
- Ben Anadolu : Güngör Dilmen - Istanbul State Theatre - 1997
- No Exit : Jean-Paul Sartre - Istanbul State Theatre - 1993
- Seven Females : Barbara Schottenfeld - Istanbul State Theatre - 1992
- The Tempest : William Shakespeare - Istanbul State Theatre - 1991
- The Idiot : Fyodor Dostoevsky\Simon Gray - Istanbul State Theatre - 1990
- Yangın Yerinde Orkideler : Memet Baydur - Istanbul State Theatre - 1989
- Tohum ve Toprak : Orhan Asena - Istanbul State Theatre - 1986
- Rhinoceros : Eugène Ionesco - Istanbul State Theatre - 1986
- Macbeth : William Shakespeare - Istanbul State Theatre - 1986
- Ah Şu Gençler : Turgut Özakman - Istanbul State Theatre - 1985
- The Good Doctor : Neil Simon - Istanbul State Theatre - 1984
- Düşüş : Nahid Sırrı Örik\Kemal Bekir - Istanbul State Theatre - 1984
- İstanbul Efendisi : Musahipzade Celal - Istanbul State Theatre - 1983
- Yoklar Dağındaki Kar : Mümtaz Zeki Taşkın - Istanbul State Theatre - 1981
- The Trojan War Will Not Take Place : Jean Giraudoux - Istanbul State Theatre - 1980

== Filmography ==
=== Film ===
- Ask Tesadüfleri Sever 3 - 2026
- Mucize 2: Aşk - 2019
- Hayat Öpücüğü - 2015
- Mandıra Filozofu - 2014
- Aşk Kırmızı - 2013
- Behzat Ç. Seni Kalbime Gömdüm - 2011
- Bir Avuç Deniz - 2011
- Aşk Tesadüfleri Sever - 2011
- Kars Öyküleri - 2010
- Sınav - 2006
- Halk Düşmanı - 2004
- Kaçıklık Diploması - 1998
- Cumhuriyet - 1998
- Bir Erkeğin Anatomisi - 1996

=== TV series ===
- Sahtekarlar - 2026 (Mediha)
- Kıskanmak - 2025-2026 (Mediha)
- Kardelenler - 2025 (Hicran Korkmaz)
- Aile-2023-2024 (Nedret Soykan)
- Gülcemal – 2023 (Zafer)
- Baba - 2022 (Fazilet Saruhanlı)
- Hercai - 2019–2021 (Azize Aslanbey-Ayşe Şadoğlu)
- Gülperi - 2018 (Ayten)
- Dudullu Postası - 2018
- Tutsak - 2017
- Poyraz Karayel 2016–2017
- Kördüğüm - 2016
- Zengin Kız Fakir Oğlan - 2012–2015 (Serpil)
- Yalancı Bahar - 2011
- Gönülçelen - 2010–2011
- Esir Kalpler - 2006
- Hatırla Sevgili - 2006
- Adı Aşk Olsun - 2004
- Kıvılcım - 1999
- Kurtuluş - 1994
- Yıldızlar Gece Büyür - 1991
- Yaprak Dökümü - 1988
- Üç İstanbul - 1983

== Awards ==
- 16th Sadri Alışık Awards : Best Supporting Actress - Aşk Tesadüfleri Sever
- Afife Theatre Awards : Best Actress in a Musical or Comedy - Angel on My Shoulder - 2007
- Lions Theatre Awards : Most Successful Actress - Angel on My Shoulder - 2007
- Istanbul Technical University Awards : Most Successful Actress - Angel on My Shoulder - 2007
- İsmet Küntay Awards : Best Actress - Yarım Bardak Su - 2004
- Afife Theatre Awards : Best Actress - Dead Guilty - 2003
- 11th Ankara Film Festival : Best Actress - Kaçıklık Diploması - 1999
- 10th Orhan Arıburnu Awards : Best Actress - Kaçıklık Diploması - 1999
