= Said Nursi =

Kurdish scholar of Islam (1877–1960)

Said Nursi Üstad • Bediüzzaman
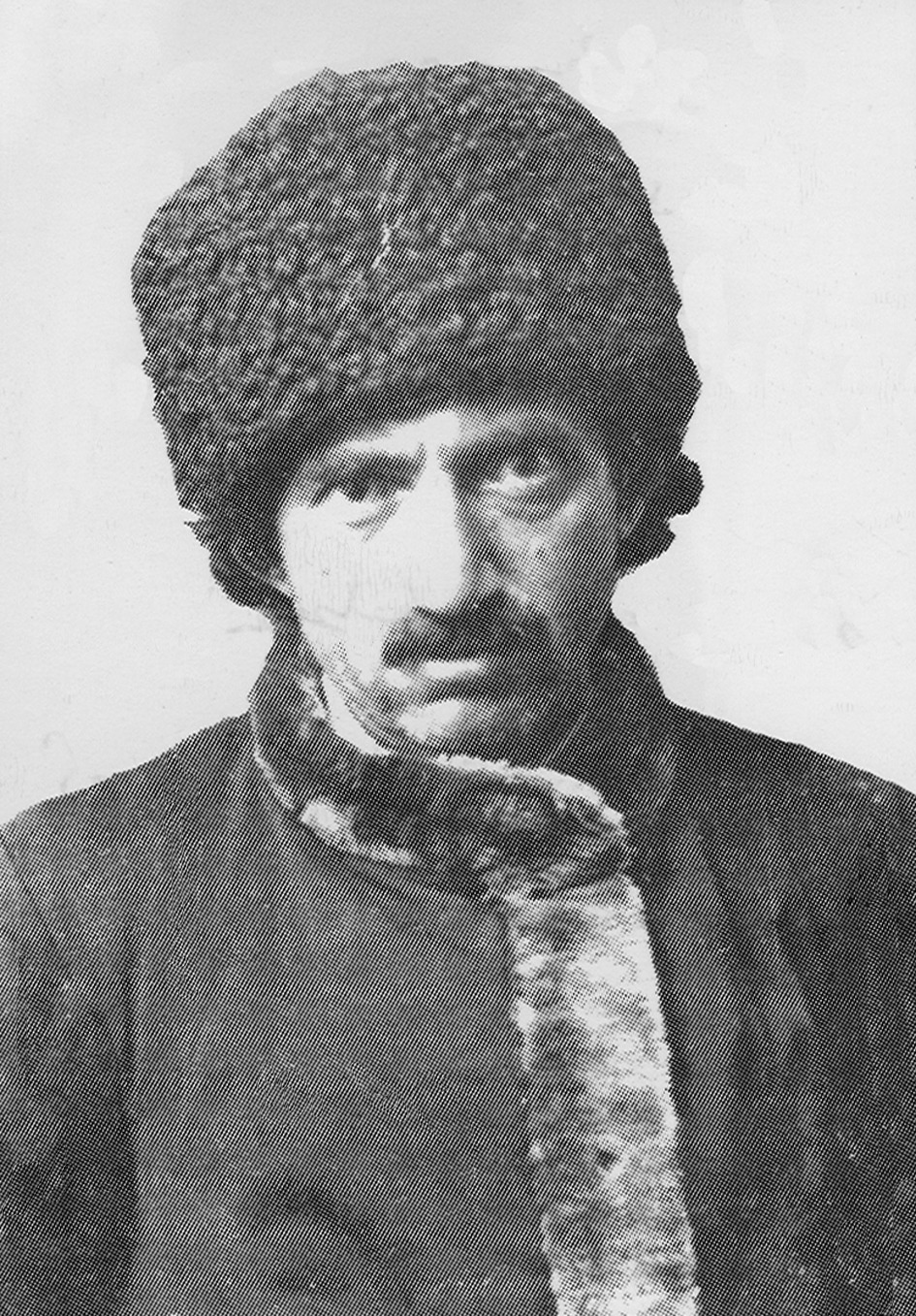
- Passport photograph, 1918

Personal life
- Born: Nurs, Bitlis Vilayet, Ottoman Empire
- Died: 23 March 1960 (aged 82–83) Urfa, Turkey
- Parents: Sofi Mirza (father); Nuriye Hanım (mother)
- Region: Kurdistan
- Main interest(s): Theology, Tafsir, Revival of Faith Kalam, Eloquence, Science and Religion Compatibility, Anti-communism

Religious life
- Religion: Islam
- Denomination: Sunni
- Jurisprudence: Shafi'i
- Creed: Ash'ari

Muslim leader
- Successor: Ahmet Husrev Altınbaşak (Publishers Group), Gülen Movement, Yeni Asya Group, Readers Group
- Influenced by: Ali ibn Abu Talib, Husayn ibn Ali, Ahmad Sirhindi, Baha' al-Din Naqshband, Ash'ari, Al-Taftazani, Ahmad Khani

Said Nursi (Note: Turkish: Said Nursî; Ottoman Turkish: سعيد نورسی; Kurdish: سەعید نوورسی, romanized: Seîdê Nursî; also spelled Said-i Nursî or Said-i Kurdî,) (1877 – 23 March 1960), known also as Said-i Kurdî, was a Kurdish scholar of Islam from Turkey who wrote the Risale-i Nur Collection, a body of Qur'anic commentary exceeding six thousand pages. His focus was on a revival of personal Islamic faith "through study, self-reform and service of others".

Believing that modern science and logic was the way of the future, he advocated teaching religious sciences in secular schools and modern sciences in religious schools. He is commonly known with the honorifics Bediüzzaman (بدیع‌الزمان; lit. 'wonder of the age') and Üstad (استاد; lit. 'teacher') among his followers.

Nursi inspired a religious movement that has played a vital role in the revival of Islam in Turkey and now numbers several millions of followers worldwide. His followers are often known as the "Nurcu movement" or the Nurcu cemaati. A 2008 publication estimates Nurcu adherents at 5 to 6 million worldwide, and around 5500 dershanes (halls where adherents study Nursi’s writings).

Originally active in politics on behalf of Islam, after the fall of the Ottoman Empire Nursi abandoned political activity and devoted himself to writing about Islam.

== Biography ==
Nursi divided his life into three periods:

1. The "Old Said" where he was actively involved in politics in the belief he could best serve Islam this way. This period lasted from his birth until early 1920's coinciding with the aftermath of World War I
2. The "New Said" period followed the upheaval of the fall of the Ottoman Empire and led Nursi to undergo a deep personal transformation. He abandoned politics and focused on writing his Risale-i Nur collection. In this he claimed to use reasoning to demonstrate truth of Islam. Most of this period was spent in jail and exile. This period ended when he was released from Afyon prison in 1949.
3. The "3rd Said" period lasted from 1949 till his death in 1960. During this time the first democratic elections in Turkey took place, and Nursi experienced relative freedom.

=== Early life ("Old Said" period) ===
Said Nursi was born Sait Okur in the Kurdish village of Nurs near Hizan in the Bitlis Vilayet of the Ottoman Empire. His father Mirza and his mother Nuriye both were said to be of the Ahl al-Bayt (lineage of the Islamic prophet Muhammad). They had seven children and modest means. As a young man he was affiliated with the Kadiri (Qadiriyya) Sufi order.

Nursi failed to earn an icâzetname (traditional diploma), but continued his education more informally through brief visits to madrasahs and notable local sheikhs.

He left Siirt to stay with his brother but returned after some time and went to the madrasa of Mullah Fathullah. He quickly impressed Fathullah with all the religious books he had read ("Süyûtî", "Mullah Jâmî", etc.) and his comprehension of them.

Said was said to be able to recite many books from memory.

"So then he [Molla Fathullah] decided to test his memory and handed him a copy of the work by Al-Hariri of Basra (1054–1122) — also famous for his intelligence and power of memory — called Maqamat al-Hariri. Said read one page once, memorized it, then repeated it by heart. Molla Fathullah expressed his amazement,"

and spread news of his talent throughout Siirt to other scholars. After this, scholars of Siirt gave him the title "Bediuzzaman" meaning "Wonder of the Age".

When he was 13–14 years old he was said to have completed the entire madrasa curriculum (of more than one hundred books) in three months, which normally takes 10–15 years to complete. Said’s approach was to rely on the teacher only for understanding of the key ideas of each book, and then to master whatever remained in the book with self-study.

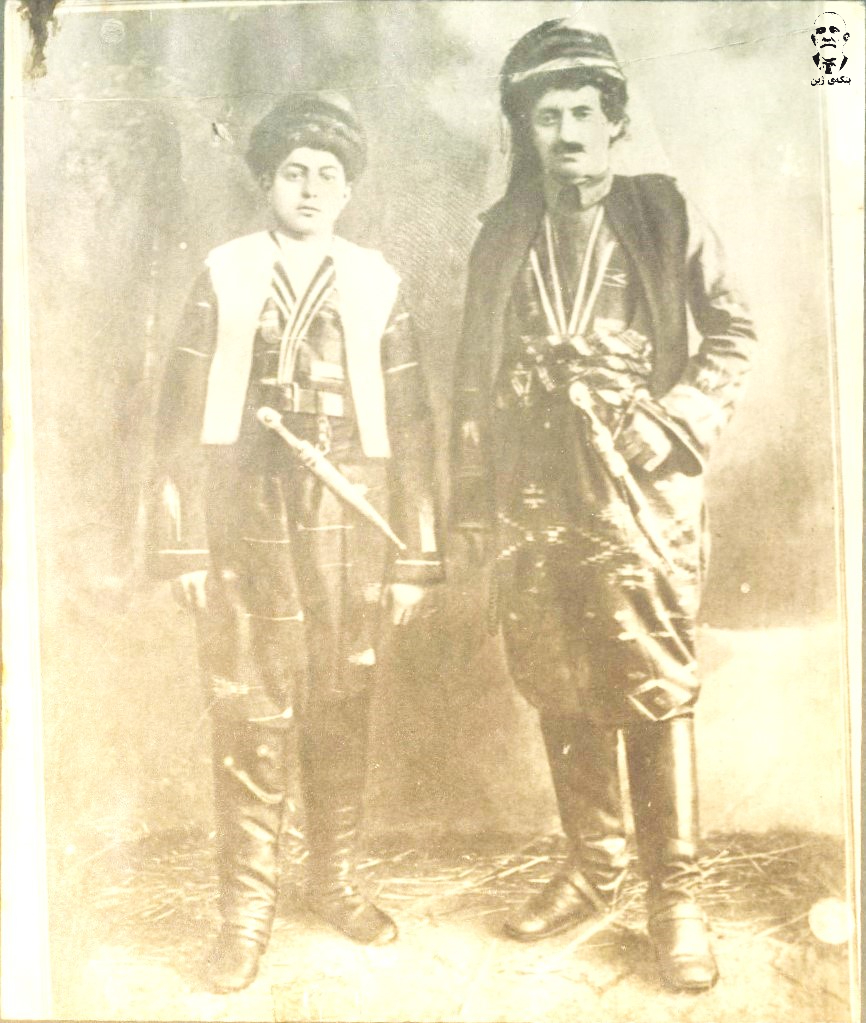
Said Nursi with his nephew and student Abdurrahman

Nursi gained the protection and patronage of the governor of Van, Tahir Pasha (1847-1913) and lived in Van from 1897 to 1907. He was reportedly invited by the governor of the Vilayet of Van to stay within his residency. In the library of the governor, Nursi gained access to an archive of scientific knowledge he had not had access to previously. He is said to have studied the principles of history, geography, mathematics, geology, physics, chemistry, astronomy, and philosophy during his stay, besides Islamic sciences, and to have memorized the 90 books he studied.

Said Nursi is also said to have learned the Ottoman Turkish language there. During this time, he developed a plan to establish a university in the Eastern provinces of the Ottoman Empire, which he named as "Madrasat-uz Zahra" which would combine scientific and religious (Islamic) education, and expected to advance overall education of these regions. He was able to secure funding for this project from the Ottoman Sultan Mehmed V and the construction started in 1913, but after the World War I started the project became void.

In late 1907, he arrived in Istanbul where he became associated with the Kurdish community, met Kurdish intellectuals and joined the Kürd Teavün ve Terakki Cemiyeti (Kurdish Society for Mutual Aid and Progress). Following the Young Turk Revolution in 1908, Nursi became an enthusiastic supporter of the constitutional regime, and published articles in a number of newspapers emphasizing the importance of the Shariah and meşveret (consultation/shura) in Islamic tradition, the necessity of education, and the needs of the Kurds. After the counterrevolution of 1909 (31 March incident), Nursi was arrested and tried, but acquitted of all charges. The following year, Nursi returned to Van in the hopes of propagating constitutionalism and legitimizing the new regime’s alliance with the Armenians among the Kurdish population. In 1911 when he was asked what he thought about the idea of appointing Armenians (who were Christians) as Governors in Ottoman States, he reportedly responded that there was no harm of doing this as there was no harm in Armenians being engineers, watchmakers, etc.

During this time his piety was outraged when he read a newspaper report claiming that William Gladstone, the British Secretary for Colonies, had told the British parliament that "so long as the Muslims have the Qur’an we shall be unable to dominate them. We must either take it from them or make them lose their love of it." Nursi allegedly declared: "I shall prove and demonstrate to the world that the Quran is an undying, inexhaustible Sun!", and set out to write his comprehensive Risale-i Nur, a collection of Said Nursi's own commentaries and interpretations of the Quran and Islam, as well as writings about his own life.

==== World War I ====
When the Ottoman Empire entered the war, Russia attacked the Eastern part of Turkey. Nursi with his students established a volunteer brigade to resist the invasion, and he served in the 3rd Army as a brigade commander. During the War, Nursi would reportedly enter the trenches himself despite heavy shelling, earning him the admiration of the troops he commanded. It was during these experiences that he allegedly wrote his Quranic commentary, İşârâtü'l-İ'câz dictating to a scribe while on horseback or when he was back in trenches. During combat, he broke his leg and was forced to surrender to Russian forces. He was taken prisoner by the Russian forces and spent two and a half years in the Kostroma prisoner camp in the North-East of Moscow.

According to legend, one day during his imprisonment, the Russian Commander-in-Chief Grand Duke Nicholas Nikolaevich came to inspect the camp. He walked in front of him but Nursi didn't stand up, unlike the other prisoners. He walked again but Nursi didn't pay any attention to Nicolaevich. Nicolaevich asked him whether he knew who he was. Nursi said that he knew who he was, but because he is a Muslim scholar and a person with faith is superior to a person without, he couldn't stand up, that would be disrespecting his own faith. Russian martial court ordered his execution. He asked to do his last prayer before the execution. After a couple of minutes, they took him and tried to blindfold him, which he refused, claiming that he wants to look at paradise. Nicolaevich admired the brave attitude of him and understood that his intention was not to insult him, his behavior was just self respect. Nicolaevich immediately ordered to stop the execution and asked for forgiveness from him. Later on, he was allowed to stay in a Tatar mosque nearby.

The Russian February Revolution disrupted the Russian war effort and like many other Ottoman prisoners of war, Nursi escaped. He returned to Istanbul in June 1918 and was welcomed as a hero.

==== Armenian genocide ====
From 1915-1917 approximately one million Armenians died during forced marches in the Syrian Desert. Others, primarily women and children, were forcibly converted to Islam. Nursi was present in four critical cities, namely Erzurum, Van, Muş, and Bitlis, during the spring and summer of 1915, when the killing of Armenians was committed. Nursi has testified that he tried to save Armenian women and children in Bitlis from being massacred. To what extent he was successful in this endeavor remains unclear, similar to his attitude towards other Armenian civilians. What Nursi's attitude was towards Armenian civilians during WWI is still a "matter of debate", according to Abdürrahim Özer.

==== Opposition to the British invasion of Istanbul ====
In the aftermath of WWI, with Istanbul under foreign occupation, Nursi became a vocal critic. He exposed foreign powers manipulating religious leaders to undermine the nascent National Independence Movement in Anatolia. The Ottoman government, pressured by the British, even issued a fatwa opposing the movement. Undeterred, Nursi publicly challenged this fatwa and called it invalid.

=== Risale-i Nur and the "Nurcu movement", ("New Said" period) ===
After the abolition of the Ottoman Sultanate in 1922, Nursi went to Ankara where he was welcomed by the parliament. His vision of an Islamic republic contradicted that of Mustafa Kemal Atatürk's plans for a secular republic, and he did not stay. In 1924, after a short visit to Istanbul, Nursi returned to Van and retreated from public and political life.

Nursi was known as Said-i Kurdî until the mid-1920s, and was known as such in his writings and official Ottoman records. However, following the tumultuous early period of the new Turkish Republic, and in light of the state-driven systematic marginalization of Kurdish identity, he assumed the name Said Nursi (after his village name of Nurs). In the subsequent years, Nursi gradually transformed himself from a Kurdish Islamic intellectual to the centennial mujaddid (a re-newer of the faith) taking what he believed was hijrah (migration) from Atatürk's new secular world.

==== Teachings and movement ====
Said believed that during this period Turkey was facing a great danger from unbelief and corruption in the form of secularization. (For example, the caliphate was abolished, the weekly holiday was changed from Friday —the traditional Islamic day of observance— to Sunday, the calendar changed from the Muslim lunar to Gregorian, and the alphabet changed from Arabic to Latin.) Therefore, Nursi believed, the greatest service that could be done for humanity in this period was to protect the faith of Islam, which he aimed to do with his work Risale-i Nur.

Risale-i Nur addresses the fundamental questions of human existence, such as the existence of God, the nature of the soul, and the purpose of life. Risale-i Nur does not rely on blind faith or mysticism. Instead, it uses reason and logic to demonstrate the truths of belief, and argues that the Quran encompasses the knowledge which allows for modern science. This makes it accessible to people of all backgrounds and beliefs.

In Risale-i Nur, Nursi argues that if you see a painting you should assume the painter. A painting cannot exist without a painter. Nature is art and not the Artist. There is a hidden hand in every creation. The extraordinary abilities of animals (like cows producing fundamental nutrients for humans from converting raw grass, trees doing photosynthesis to produce sugar and carrying water to 200 feet high leaves, trees growing from a tiny seed) cannot be attributed to them but to their Creator. He uses analogies, reasoning and logic to prove God's existence. According to Nursi all systems in the universe are interrelated. The designer of the Galaxies must be the designer of the Earth, human beings and all other creation. According to him "the One who created the eye of the mosquito must be the One who created the Sun"

According to him, the Muslim world had 3 enemies: Ignorance, Poverty, and Division. To defeat these 3 enemies Muslims should use 3 weapons: Education, Industry/Craftmanship, and Unity.

Nursi considered materialism and atheism and their source materialist philosophy to be his true enemies in this age of science, reason, and civilization. He combated them with (what he believed were) reasoned proofs in the Risale-i Nur, considering the Risale-i Nur as the most effective barrier against the corruption of society caused by these enemies.

Besides the Risale-i Nur, a major factor in the success of Nursi's movement may be attributed to the very method Nursi had chosen, which may be summarized with two phrases: mânevî jihad, that is, 'spiritual jihad' or 'non-physical jihad', and 'positive action.' In order to be able to pursue this 'spiritual jihad' Nursi insisted that his students avoided any use of force and disruptive action. Through 'positive action,' and the maintenance of public order and security, the supposed damage caused by the forces of unbelief could be 'repaired' by the 'healing' truths of the Quran.

Nursi's influence concerned the founding father and the first president of the Republic of Turkey, Mustafa Kemal Atatürk. Nursi was then exiled to Isparta Province for, amongst other things, performing the call to prayer in the Arabic language. After his teachings attracted people in the area, the governor of Isparta sent him to a village named Barla where he wrote two-thirds of his Risale-i Nur. These manuscripts were sent to Sav, another village in the region, where people duplicated them in Arabic script (which was officially replaced by the modern Turkish alphabet in 1928). After being finished, these books were sent to Nursi's disciples all over Turkey via the "Nurcu postal system". Nursi repeatedly stated that all the persecutions and hardships inflicted on him by the secularist regime were God's blessings and that having destroyed the formal religious establishment, they had unwittingly left popular Islam as the only authentic faith of the Turks.

Sheikh Said had invited Said Nursi to join the Sheikh Said rebellion in 1926, although Said Nursi had rejected and criticised it. Despite his tensions with Sheikh Said, he was mistaken for Sheikh Said and targeted on many occasions; he was exiled to Burdur after the Sheikh Said rebellion. Said Nursi opposed Kurdish independence and advocated for the revival of the Ottoman Empire.

Said Nursi lived much of his life in prison and in exile (over 20 years), persecuted by the secularist state for having invested in religious revival. He advised his students to focus on spreading Risale-i Nur books and teaching people about them even when they were in jail. And most of the Risale-i Nur collection were written when he was in exile or jail.

The period believed to be the "golden age of Mahdi" will come in the future, and after this period that will last 30–40 years, irreligion will prevail again. According to him, the Doomsday may fall on the heads of the atheists in the Hijri calendar between 1530 and 1540.

=== Later life ("3rd Said" period) ===
Alarmed by the growing popularity of Nursi's teachings, which had spread even among the intellectuals and the military officers, the government arrested him for allegedly violating laws mandating secularism and sent him to exile. He was acquitted of all these charges in 1956.

In the last decade of his life, Said Nursi settled in the city of Isparta. After the introduction of the multi-party system, he advised his followers to vote for the Democratic Party of Adnan Menderes, which had restored some religious freedom. Said Nursi was a staunch anti-Communist, denouncing Communism as the greatest danger of the time. In 1956, he was allowed to have his writings printed. His books are collected under the name Risale-i Nur ("Letters of Divine Light").

He died of exhaustion after travelling to Urfa. He was buried in a tomb opposite the cave where prophet Ibrahim (Abraham) is widely believed to have been born. After the military coup d'état in Turkey in 1960, a group of soldiers led by the later right-wing politician Alparslan Türkeş opened his grave and buried him at an unknown place near Isparta during July 1960 in order to prevent popular veneration.

== Nur Movement after his death ==
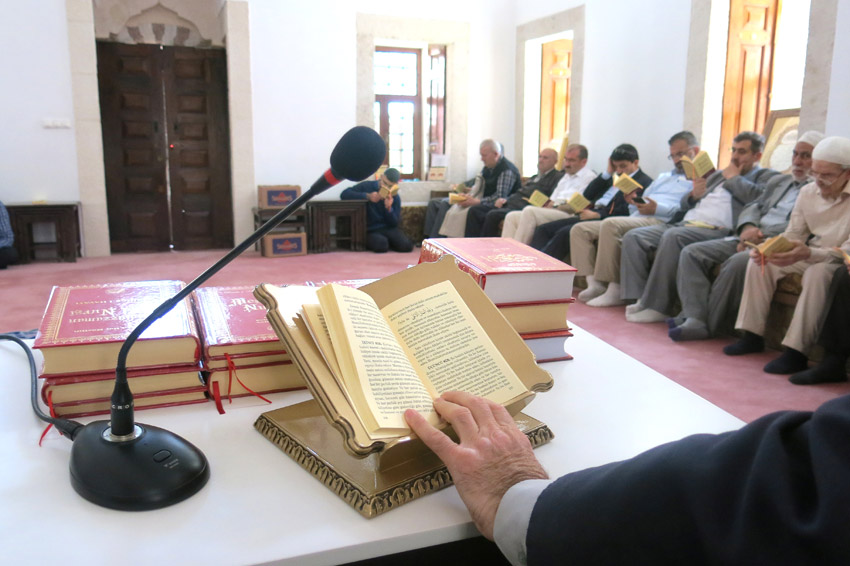
A study of Risale-i Nur books

Two months after the Nursi's death, on May 27, 1960, a coup overthrew the democratically elected Democrat Party government, ending a period of relative political freedom in Turkey. The Prime Minister was executed and Nur movement members were also persecuted.

In the following years multiple movements came out of the Nur movement including Gülen movement, Okuyucular (Readers) movement, Yeni Asya movement, Yazicilar (Publishers) movement.

== In popular culture ==
Published in 1999, Fred Reed's travelogue describes a journey around Turkey in the footsteps of Said Nursi.

A Turkish film Free Man based on Nursi's biography was made in 2011.

An animated movie titled "God's Faithful Servant: Barla" was made about his life in 2011

== See also ==
- Muhammad Emin Er (1914-2013), one of Said Nursi's students
- Habiburrahman Shakir (1903 – 1975), one of Said Nursi's first European students
- Bediüzzaman Museum, a museum inside the Rüstem Pasha Medrese at Fatih, Istanbul
- Zübeyir Gündüzalp (1920-1971) - One of the closest students of Said Nursi-
- Erisale - Read Risale-i Nur Online
- The Qur'an Revealed: A Critical Analysis of Said Nursi's Epistles of Light, an analysis of Risale-i Nur by Dr. Colin Turner, Durham University, UK
- Bediuzzaman Said Nursi Chair at John Carrol University
- List of Kurdish philosophers

== Sources ==
- Camilla T. Nereid (1997). In the Light of Said Nursi: Turkish Nationalism and the Religious Alternative. Centre for Middle Eastern and Islamic Studies, University of Bergen. ISBN 978-1-85065-309-7.
- Sahiner, Necmettin, Son Sahitler 3, Nesil Yayinlari, 2004.
- Şükran Vahide (16 February 2012). Islam in Modern Turkey: An Intellectual Biography of Bediuzzaman Said Nursi. SUNY Press. ISBN 978-0-7914-8297-1.
- Ian S. Markham; Suendam Birinci; Suendam Birinci Pirim (2011). An Introduction to Said Nursi: Life, Thought and Writings. Ashgate Publishing, Ltd. ISBN 978-1-4094-0770-6.
