= Jim Stanton =

American composer and political writer

- Born: Philadelphia, Pennsylvania
- Occupations: Writer, composer
- Political party: Independent

Jim Stanton is an American composer and political writer.

== Musician ==
Stanton was a drummer with the Tommy Dorsey Orchestra in the mid-1960s. He played with various small groups and big bands through the 1960s and early 1970s. He co-led his own recording and performing group, Dialogue, in the 1970s.

== Composer, playwright, and writer ==
Stanton wrote the score for an original radio production of The Trial of the Catonsville Nine by Daniel Berrigan, played on WBAI-FM in New York City in 1971. He wrote a two-person play, Chatoyant, in 1977, opening and performing it in the Philadelphia area with music played by Terry Gross on Fresh Air.

Stanton composed sound and score for an original production of Shakespeare's The Tempest in 1980 (People's Light and Theatre Company, Malvern, Pennsylvania). He also composed in MIDI format at his home in the late 2000's, sharing them on CD-R format. (The Music of Jim Stanton 2005/2006, Copper Beach Music)

He would go on to write many independent orchestral pieces, scored for many different instrumental combinations.

In the spring of 2008, he began writing his autobiography.

== Politics ==
Stanton wrote many articles for the Philadelphia Weekly (Welcomat) and various national publications on politics and history (1982 to '84).
