= Tara Jaff =

Iraqi Kurdish musician

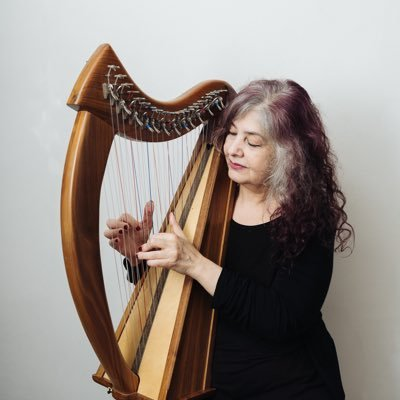

Background information
- Born: 1958 (age 67–68); Baghdad, Iraq
- Origin: Halabja, Kurdistan Region
- Genres: classical Kurdish music, folk, global music, fusion
- Occupations: Musician, singer, harpist, songwriter
- Instruments: Celtic harp, guitar, mandolin, charango, bağlama
- Years active: 1976–present
- Labels: Kom Müzik, Avaye Barbod, Sony Music
- Website: tarajaff.com

Tara Jaff (Kurdish: تارا جاف, romanized: Tara Gaf) (born 1958 in Baghdad, Iraq) is a Kurdish musician, singer, and harpist. She is recognized for introducing the Celtic harp to Kurdish music, particularly in the Hawrami dialect, and blending traditional Kurdish melodies with classical, folk, and world influences.

== Early life and education ==
Jaff was born in Baghdad to a Kurdish father from the Jaff family of Halabja who was also a diplomat, and a mother of Tatar Turkish descent. She began piano studies at age ten at the Baghdad Musical Academy and also learned guitar, mandolin, charango, and bağlama.

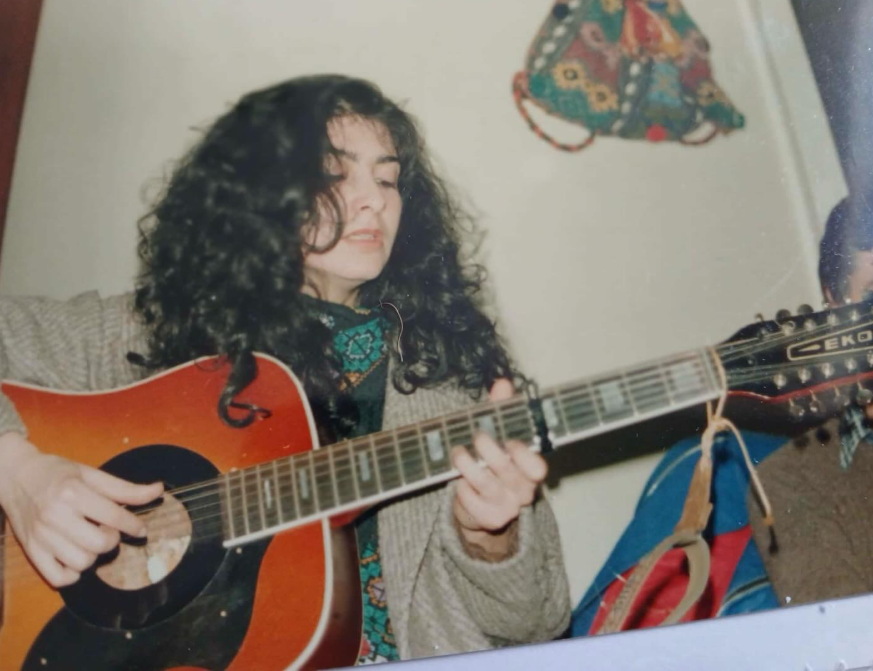
Jaff, in 1981, United Kingdom.

After refusing to join the Ba'ath Party student organization, she was expelled from the academy.

In 1976, Jaff moved to the United Kingdom where she continued her studies, explored English folk music, and performed in local folk clubs.

== Career ==
Jaff experimented with multiple string instruments before discovering the Celtic harp, inspired by ancient Mesopotamian harps from Hurrians, Assyria, Sumer, and Elam.

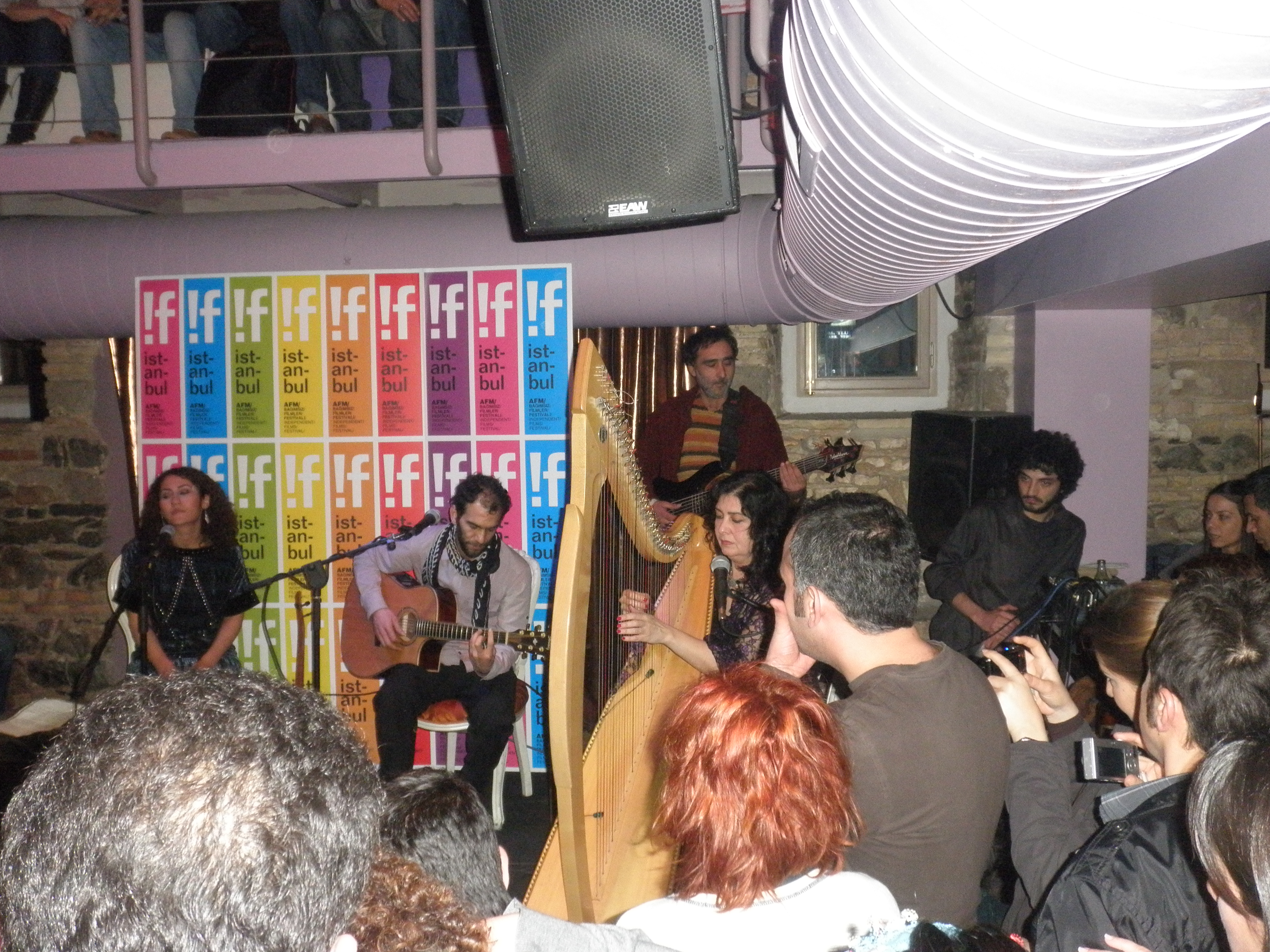
(Aynur Doğan, Mehmet Atlı, Tara Jaff) in Istanbul Festival (IF), 2011.

She adapted the harp to Kurdish music using novel tuning and plucking methods.

She has performed widely as a solo artist and in collaborations with musicians, poets, filmmakers, and visual artists, including Adnan Karim and Aynur Doğan. Jaff also participates in outreach programs bringing music to hospitals for therapeutic purposes.

=== Musical style ===
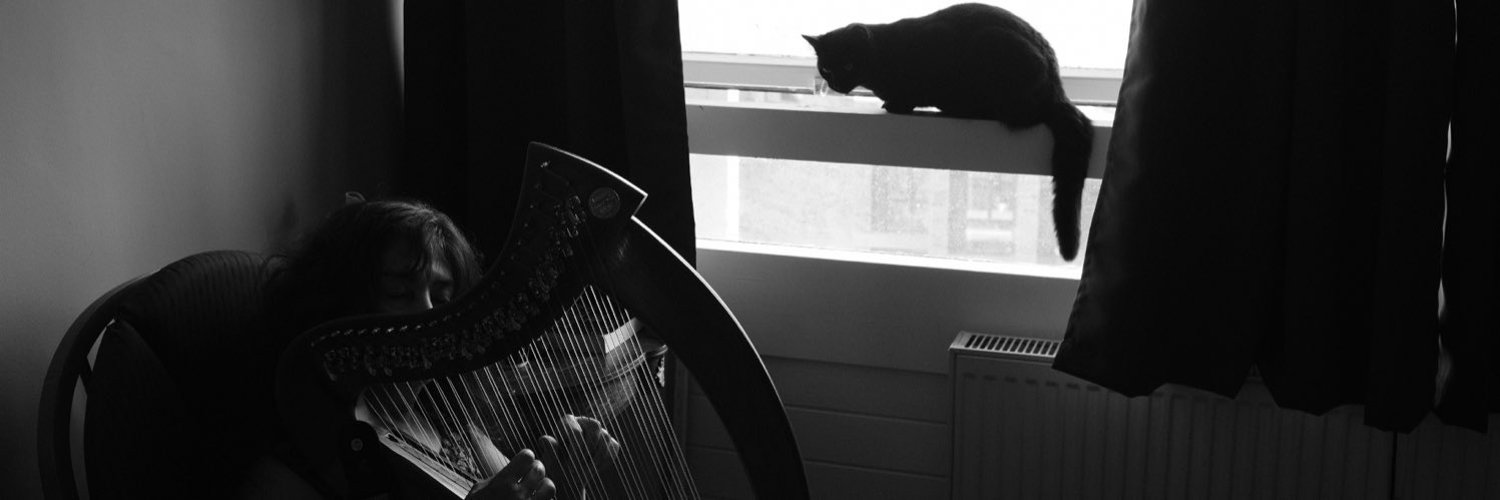
Jaff and her balck cat, mostly seen in her performations online.

Jaff emphasizes the preservation of classical Kurdish music, particularly the Hawrami style, blending its melodic modes and rhythms with Western harp techniques.

=== Career timeline ===
==== Early years and ensembles (1976–1990s) ====
- 1976–1980: Joined a Chilean music band in London, performing songs of solidarity against the Pinochet regime (live performances, archival recordings).
- 1990s: Began introducing the Celtic harp to Kurdish music, performing at European cultural festivals.

==== Definitive studio albums ====
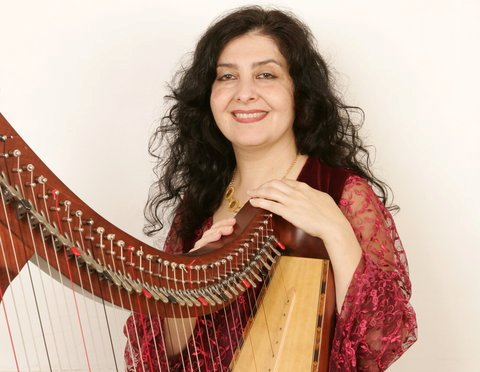
Tara Jaff as a guest in the Kurdish branch of VOA, 2012.

1. Diley Dêwanem (2006, Kom Müzik) – Notable tracks: "Yaran", "Ruhi Rewan", "Symfonyay Guman".
2. Asewar (Dialogue of Harp and Ney) (2012, Barbad Music) – Collaboration with Fardin Lahourpour.
3. Tembur & Harp – Sony Music (2015) – Collaboration with Cemil Qoçgiri.

==== Notable singles & collaborations ====
Year	Song/Project	Collaborator/Source
2004	Hanasay Ashqan	With Adnan Karim
2014	Malan Bar Kir	Featured in "Music from Kurdistan"
2016	I Have No Wish to Say Goodbye	With Eleanor Turner & Rowena Calvert
2020	Qimil	With Pervin Chakar
2021	Na, Ne Tenê Me – I	With Mehmet Atlı
2022	Harp	Solo, including "The Black Cat", "Deer Hunting"
2025	Sultan	With Farid Elhami
2026	Dubara	Featuring Sia the Dj (Electronic/Global Fusion)

==== Archival and live performances ====
- Peşk (Compilation) – Multi-artist Kurdish compilation featuring her harp arrangements.
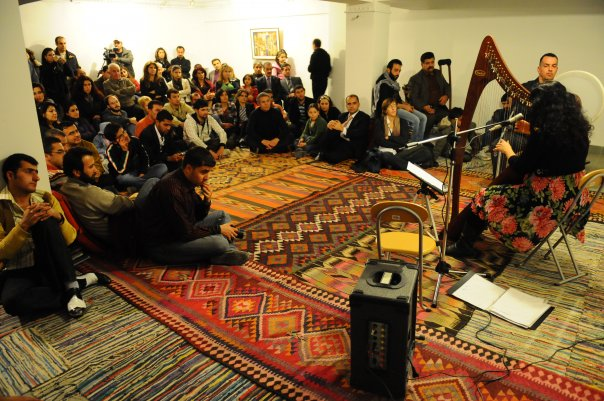
  Tara Jaff playing the Harp during a cultural gathering at Aram Gallery in Sulaymaniyah.
- The Oran Project – Exploration of Celtic and Middle Eastern musical crossovers.
- Live at La Marbrerie (2018, Paris) – Concert featuring Rusan Filiztek.

== Cultural and advocacy work ==
Jaff participates in Kurdish cultural events, charity concerts for disaster victims, and serves on the London Kurdish Film Festival organizing committee.

She is a proponent of preserving classical Kurdish music and collaborates with various groups to promote Kurdish heritage. Jaff has showed solidarity for the Kurdish slogan Women, Life, Freedom, and has participated in a public demonstration in London against abuses done to Kurdish women fighters of Rojava by ISIS, joining the hair-braiding activity as a form of resistance and asking for International recognition for the sacrifices.

== Personal life ==
Tara has been married once to a Palestinian man. From this previous marriage, she has one child named: "Nahwand Jaff" who is an artist and photographer. She has not remarried.

Jaff speaks Kurdish Hawrami, Kurdish Sorani, Kurdish Kurmanji, English, and Turkish.
