= Mehmet Günsür =

Turkish model, actor and producer (born 1975)

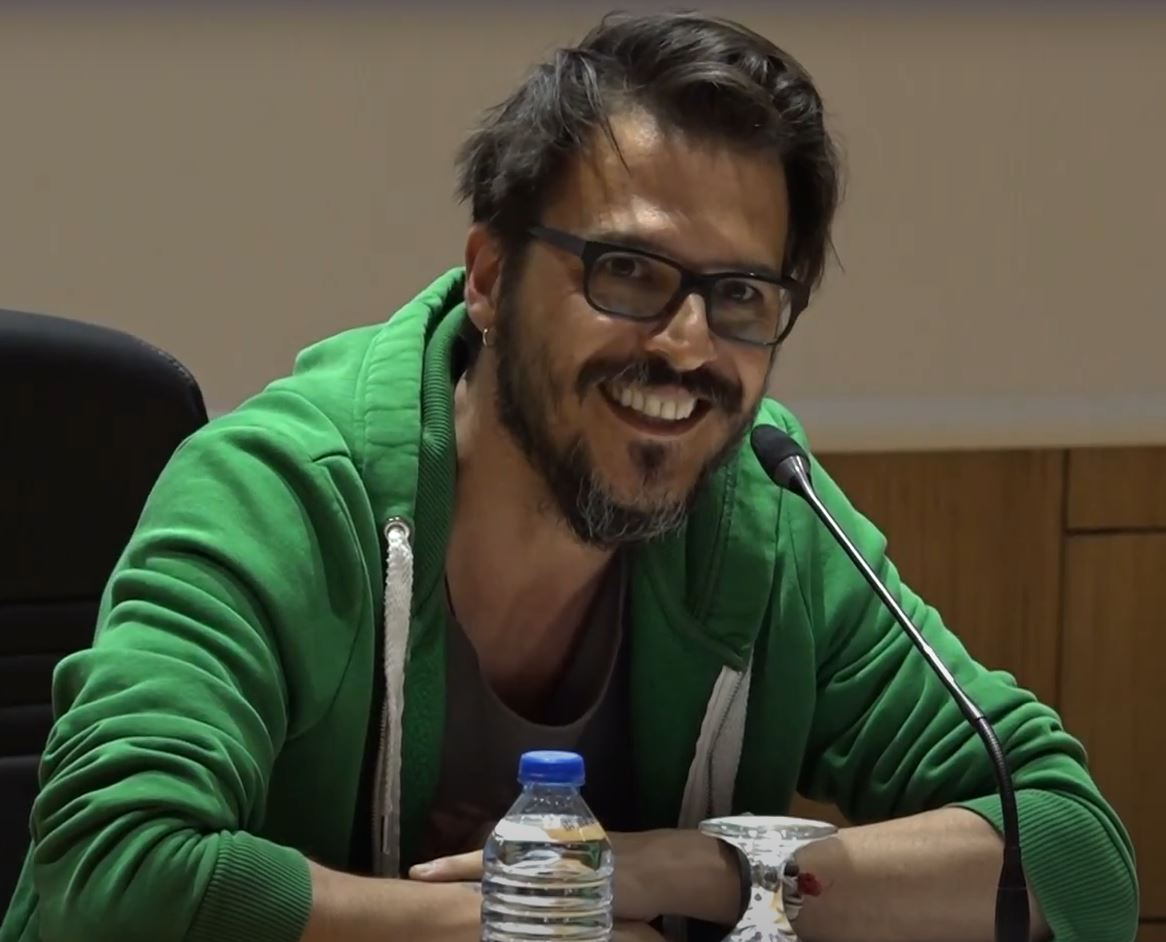
- Born: 8 May 1975 (age 51); Fatih, Istanbul, Turkey
- Education: Marmara University; Liceo Italiano di Istanbul
- Occupations: Actor, model, producer
- Years active: 1989–present
- Spouse: Katerina Mongio (m. 2006)
- Children: 3

Mehmet Günsür (Turkish pronunciation: [mehˈmet ɟynˈsyɾ]; born 8 May 1975) is a Turkish model, actor and producer.

== Early life ==
Günsür was born in 1975 as the second child of a family of Tatar descent (a Turkic ethnic subgroup). His mother, Sibel, was a lecturer and his father, Teoman, was an industrial engineer who graduated from the Middle East Technical University and worked in a number of different sectors. His older sister Zeynep Günsür Yüceil is an associate professor in Kadir Has University.

== Career ==
He began his acting career at the age of seven in various commercials. At the age of 14, he appeared in Okan Uysaler's series Geçmiş Bahar Mimozaları with actors such as Rutkay Aziz, Filiz Akın and Müşfik Kenter. After graduating from the Italian High School, he entered the Marmara University Communication Faculty and graduated with honors. Günsür gave concerts with a music group and ran a restaurant for four years. With a friend's help, he auditioned for a role in the movie Hamam. After the trial shot, he was accepted for the role and the film was directed by Ferzan Özpetek. After this film, he decided to turn to acting.

Günsür got married on 17 July 2006 to the Italian documentalist Caterina Mongio, whom he met in 2004. They have 3 children.

== Filmography ==
Film
Year	Title	Role	Notes
1997	Hamam	Mehmet	
1999	Hayal Kurma Oyunları	Futbolcu	
2001	Tommaso	Giovanni	TV movie
2001	Giuda	Giovanni	TV movie
2002	İtalyan	Giorgio	
2003	Il papa buono	Don Paolo	TV movie
2003	O Şimdi Asker	Nihat Denizer	
2004	Hayal Kurma Oyunları	Futbolcu	
2005	Anlat İstanbul	Rıfkı	
2007	Fall Down Dead	Stefan Kerchek	
2008	Se chiudi gli occhi		
2010	Ses	Onur	
2010	Matrimoni e altri disastri	Andrea	
2011	Aşk Tesadüfleri Sever	Özgür Turgut	
2014	Unutursam Fısılda	Tarık Ertuğrul	
2017	İstanbul Kırmızısı	Yusuf	
2017	Martıların Efendisi	Şenol	
2020	Figli	Tipo Sempatico	
Web Series
Year	Title	Role	Notes
2017–2018	Fi	Deniz Sarızeybek	
2018	Kanaga	Mardin Tamay	
2019–2021	Atiye	Erhan	
2022	Devils	Araba Sheikh	
Tv Series
Year	Title	Role	Notes
1989	Geçmiş Bahar Mimozaları	Sabih	
1989	Cahide		
1999	Sır Dosyası	Ayhan İnce	
2001	Don Matteo		
2002	Le ragioni del cuore		
2003	Pilli Bebek	Tarık	
2004	Kasırga İnsanları	Sinan	
2005–2006	Beyaz Gelincik	Mustafa Aslanbaş	
2007–2008	Bıçak Sırtı	Mehmet Ertuğrul	
2011	Saigon, l'été de nos 20 ans	Spaghetti	
2012–2014	Muhteşem Yüzyıl	Şehzade Mustafa	
2021	La Compagnia del Cigno	Teoman Kaya	
2022	Lea - Un nuovo giorno	Arturo Minerva	
Short Film
Year	Title	Role	Notes
2003	Stregeria		
2004	Non ci sarebbe niente da fare!		
2011	Master Plan	Mr. M	
