= Turkish Airlines fleet =

Aircraft operated by the national carrier of Turkey

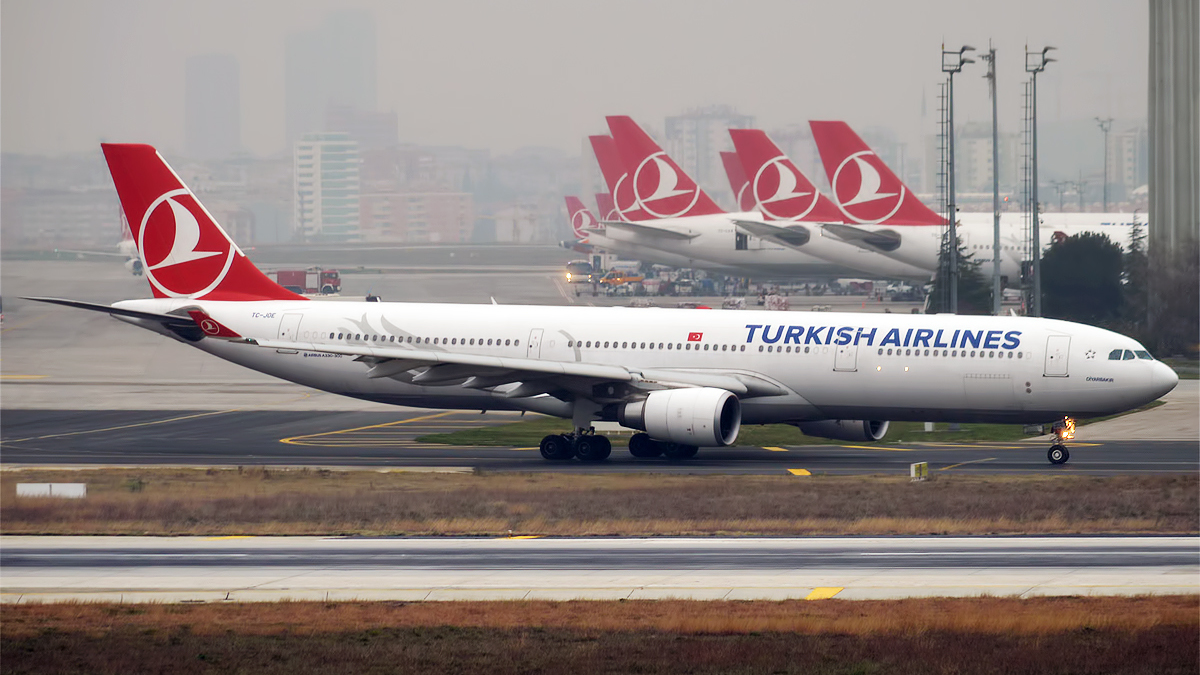
An Airbus A330, of which Turkish Airlines is the second largest operator of the type, at now defunct Istanbul Atatürk Airport, with multiple other Turkish Airlines aircraft in the background

As of September 2025, Turkish Airlines operates a fleet of 388 Airbus and Boeing aircraft. The airline started its operations in 1933 with only five planes. In 1945, the airline bought over 30 cheap Douglas DC-3 and Douglas C-47s used in the Second World War from the United States of America. The DC-3s had numerous issues regarding their safety but remained in the fleet until 1967. The first jet-engined aircraft, a leased McDonnell Douglas DC-9, joined the fleet in the same year. In 1972, several McDonnell Douglas DC-10s were acquired, becoming the first wide-body aircraft of the carrier. Fokker F28 Fellowships also joined the fleet the same year. Boeing 727s were added two years later. With the Airbus A310 joining in 1985, Douglas DC-10 and Fokker F28s were transferred to Boğaziçi Hava Taşımacılığı to standardize the fleet. After evaluating the Boeing 747, McDonnell Douglas MD-11 and the Airbus A340, the carrier chose the latter as the replacement of the DC-10.

The Boeing 737-400 was added in 1991, and the first Airbus A340 in 1993. The same year, the carrier also received Avro RJ100s to fly domestic airports with limited infrastructure, replacing the Douglas DC-9. Six Boeing 737-800 joined in 1998. The fleet size remained nearly constant from 1995 to 2003. In 2004 and 2005, the airline ordered almost 60 aircraft from Airbus and Boeing. Avro RJ aircraft with high operating costs were removed from the fleet. From 2003 to 2008, the airline almost doubled its fleet size from 65 to 120 aircraft. In 2008, Turkish Airlines started leasing Airbus A320 and Boeing 737 Next Generation aircraft. The airline also leased three Boeing 777-300ERs the same year. In 2010, 40 narrow-body jets were ordered.

In 2013, the airline announced a record order for 117 Airbus aircraft, including jets from the new Airbus A320neo family. The next month, Turkish Airlines also ordered 60 Boeing 737 MAX aircraft. Two years later, an additional 20 aircraft from the Airbus A320neo family were ordered. During the winter of 2016, the carrier grounded 30 aircraft due to a downfall in traffic. In March 2018, Turkish Airlines finalized its order for 25 Boeing 787 and 25 Airbus A350 aircraft. In 2019, the airline announced that it was interested in the Airbus A220 and Embraer E190/E195. Due to the impact of the COVID-19 pandemic, Turkish Airlines grounded over 100 aircraft in the winter of 2020. A few months later, the carrier cancelled an order for 40 Boeing 737 MAX aircraft. Since 2021, the carrier has been removing the Airbus A330 aircraft from its fleet, which are being replaced by the newer aircraft. Turkish Airlines announced its plans to order 600 new aircraft in 2023, though no firm order was placed.

Aircraft in the Turkish Airlines fleet are named after Turkey's districts, provinces, rivers and tourist places, with some leased planes having no name. Since 2010, the airline has used a predominantly white livery with blue lettering, a grey tulip stretching from the middle to the end of the aircraft fuselage and a red tail which includes the company logo inside a circle. Turkish Airlines also operates several Airbus aircraft which have a special livery, and as a member of Star Alliance, also aircraft with the alliance livery.

== Fleet development ==
=== Early years ===
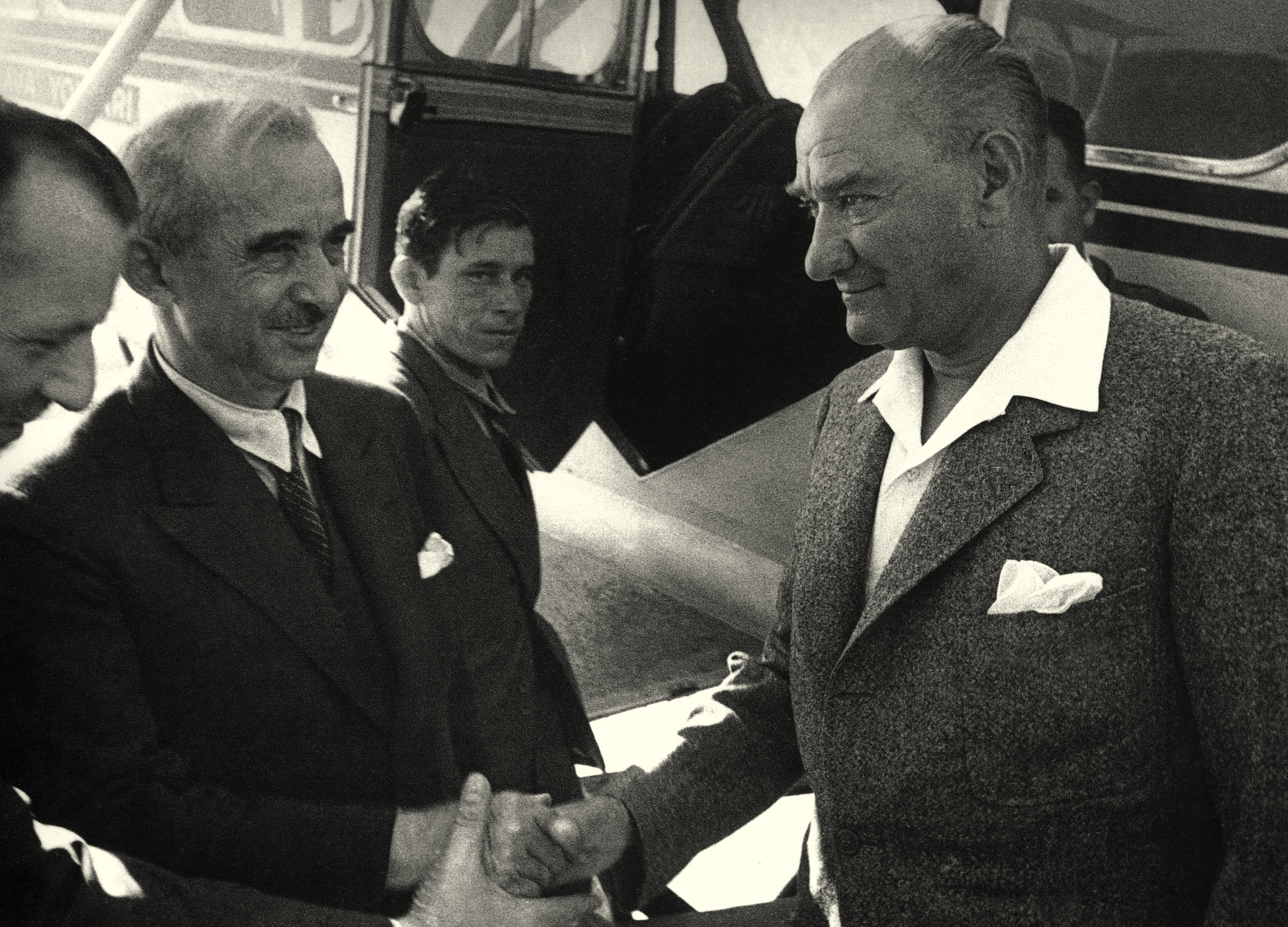
Atatürk and İsmet İnönü in front of a de Havilland aircraft in 1936

In October 1932, the Turkish state ordered two Kingbird D-2 aircraft from Curtiss-Wright for usage on domestic postal services and possibly passenger flights in the future. These aircraft arrived in Turkey in January 1933. Meanwhile, the government repaired two of the three unused Junkers F 13 it already owned with parts from Germany. These did not go on regular flights and were kept as spare aircraft in case the Kingbirds had to go out of service. Postal flights from Istanbul to Ankara via Eskişehir started in February; passenger services commenced later in April as a trial by the Turkish Aeroplane Society (TTaC). Turkish Airlines, then under the Turkish State Airlines (Turkish: Devlet Hava Yolları) name, officially started its operations on 20 May 1933 with these aircraft. Later in October, the country was gifted a Polikarpov R-5 and a Tupolev ANT-9 aircraft by the Soviet Union. The Tupolev was also transferred to the airline, though the lack of spare parts resulted in its removal from service within two years.

The two Junkers F 13s were also removed and handed over to TTaC due to their single-engined characteristics not being suitable for safe and comfortable passenger flights. Over time, the relationship between the Turkish government and Curtiss-Wright worsened as the manufacturer complained of payment issues and the long bureaucratic processes in Turkey. Despite changes in key people on the Turkish side, the relations were never fully restored, and the airline started to search for European manufacturers instead. To replace all the out-going aircraft, the state reached an agreement with British de Havilland in late 1935 for four de Havilland Dragon Rapide, four de Havilland Expresses and one de Havilland Dragonfly, which arrived throughout 1936 and 1937.

=== World War II and post-war period ===
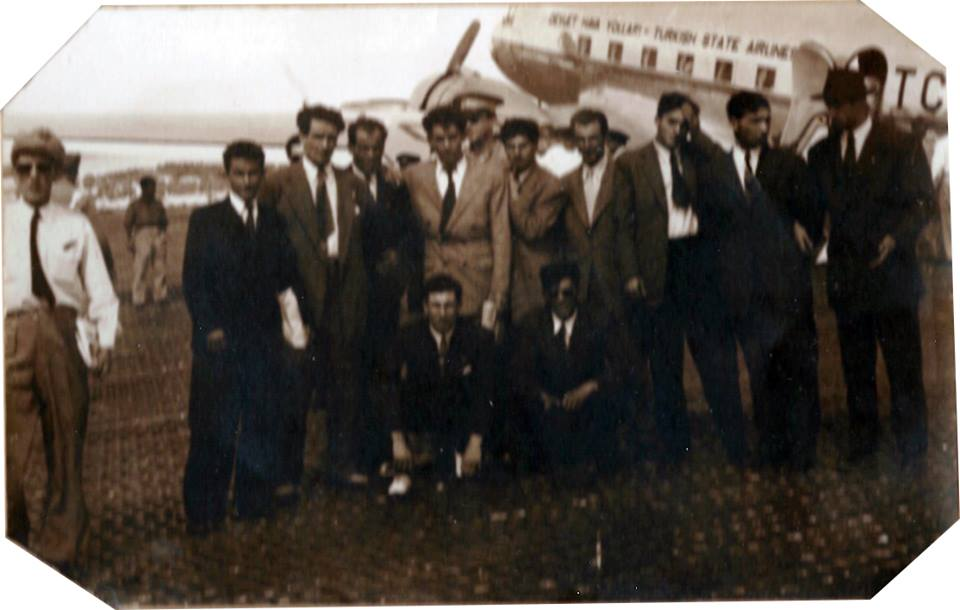
Raşit Öztaş in front of a Turkish State Airline Douglas DC-3

Fleet development in the following years was limited, and the number of aircraft of the airline remained the same until 1943. As Turkey stayed neutral until the very end of World War II, the state was interested in passenger aircraft from both sides throughout the early 1940s. In 1939, the country approached German manufacturer Junkers to purchase five Ju 52 aircraft in exchange for some raw materials. The two sides failed to agree as the negotiations took years. In the meantime, the carrier was able to add six de Havilland Dominies, the military version of the Dragon Rapide, to its fleet. The same year, an agreement was finally reached for the five Ju 52s, which were delivered a year later in 1944. During the war, the state wanted to purchase even larger aircraft from the United States and Britain, but these offers were rejected by the two countries.

Even before the end of the war, the Turkish state was in talks with the United States to acquire former military aircraft that were going to be unused otherwise. While initially rejected, the sale of the first three Douglas DC-3s was approved in December 1944 with the assistance of Trans World Airlines. Talks continued in 1946 and more DC-3s and Douglas C-47s were ordered for both the airline as well as the Turkish Air Force. The ordering and deliveries of aircraft happened in batches throughout 1946 to 1948. The first aircraft entered service in 1946 after each went through a maintenance check. In total, the airline ended up with 30 DC-3 and three C-47 aircraft which were previously stored in Cairo, Egypt. Many had faults, which led to their price being very low. The purchase increased the fleet size of the carrier to 52 aircraft, thereby making it the largest airline in the Middle East. The interior of these aircraft, which were configured to the needs of the war when bought, were refurbished between 1946 and 1950 at the Turkish Aeronautical Association maintenance centre in Etimesgut Air Base. With these new aircraft, the number of flights operated by the airline quadrupled within four years after the end of the war.

=== Final propeller aircraft ===
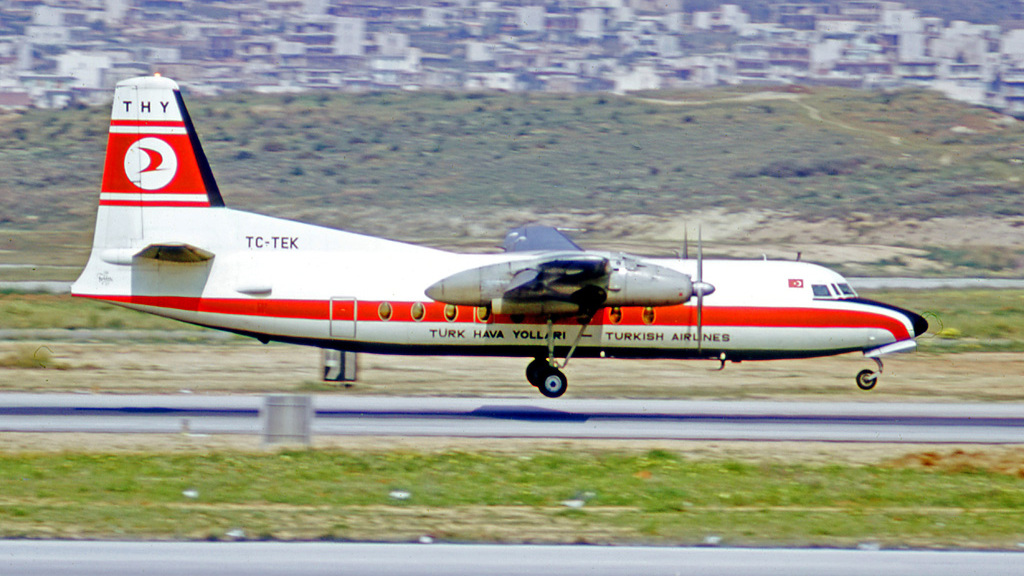
Fokker F27 Friendships were delivered in 1960.

The Douglas DC-3 and Douglas C-47s were kept and all other types were removed from service as the fleet size dropped to 33 in 1947. In 1950, only 14 of the 33 aircraft were in operation; spare parts, including engines, were ordered from the United States to repair the rest. In the following years, the number of Douglas DC-3s of the airline dropped to 16, several of which were inoperative. Seven were considered to be hangar queens that required a lot of maintenance, while five were getting revised in the Netherlands by Fokker. Due to financial difficulties, four planes were stuck in the Netherlands, from which point the airline started revising the DC-3s on its own. This turned out to be faster and significantly cheaper. By the mid-1950s, the airline started to remove some of these aircraft from the fleet, either by selling or scrapping, as their condition worsened.

In April 1956, the airline, now renamed to Turkish Airlines, started assessing potential aircraft to replace the ageing Douglas aircraft. At the time, the airline had a strong technical partnership with Pan Am. This led to the United States offering Douglas C-54 aircraft for the airline in 1957. The same year, the airline initiated talks with British manufacturer Vickers as well as the British Overseas Airways Corporation (BOAC) for a partnership. When this information was obtained by Pan Am, they offered the Douglas DC-4 instead, which was not accepted by Turkish Airlines as they went with BOAC. After Middle East Airlines cancelled its order for Vickers Viscount aircraft, one of the aircraft was sold to Turkish Airlines. In 1958, the airline ordered an additional four Viscounts for a total of five.

In 1958, the airline considered ordering the Fokker F27 Friendship or its American version, the Fairchild F-27, as the type was deemed to be efficient in short-haul flights as well as suitable for Anatolian airports with poor infrastructure. While initially picking the Fairchild version, the airline later changed its mind as the American version was more expensive and further away from Turkey, which would make it difficult to get technical support should it be necessary. Seven Fokker F27s were ordered in January 1959. The order was updated in December as the airline decided to split the order evenly across the versions, with five of each. The ten aircraft were delivered from 1960 to 1961. With these new aircraft now operational, the airline started selling its remaining Douglas DC-3 and C-47s. The airworthy aircraft were sold quickly in the domestic market. The last six aircraft, which were unairworthy, were stored and stayed with the airline as buyers were difficult to find, with the final ones only being sold in the mid-1970s.

=== Start of the jet age ===
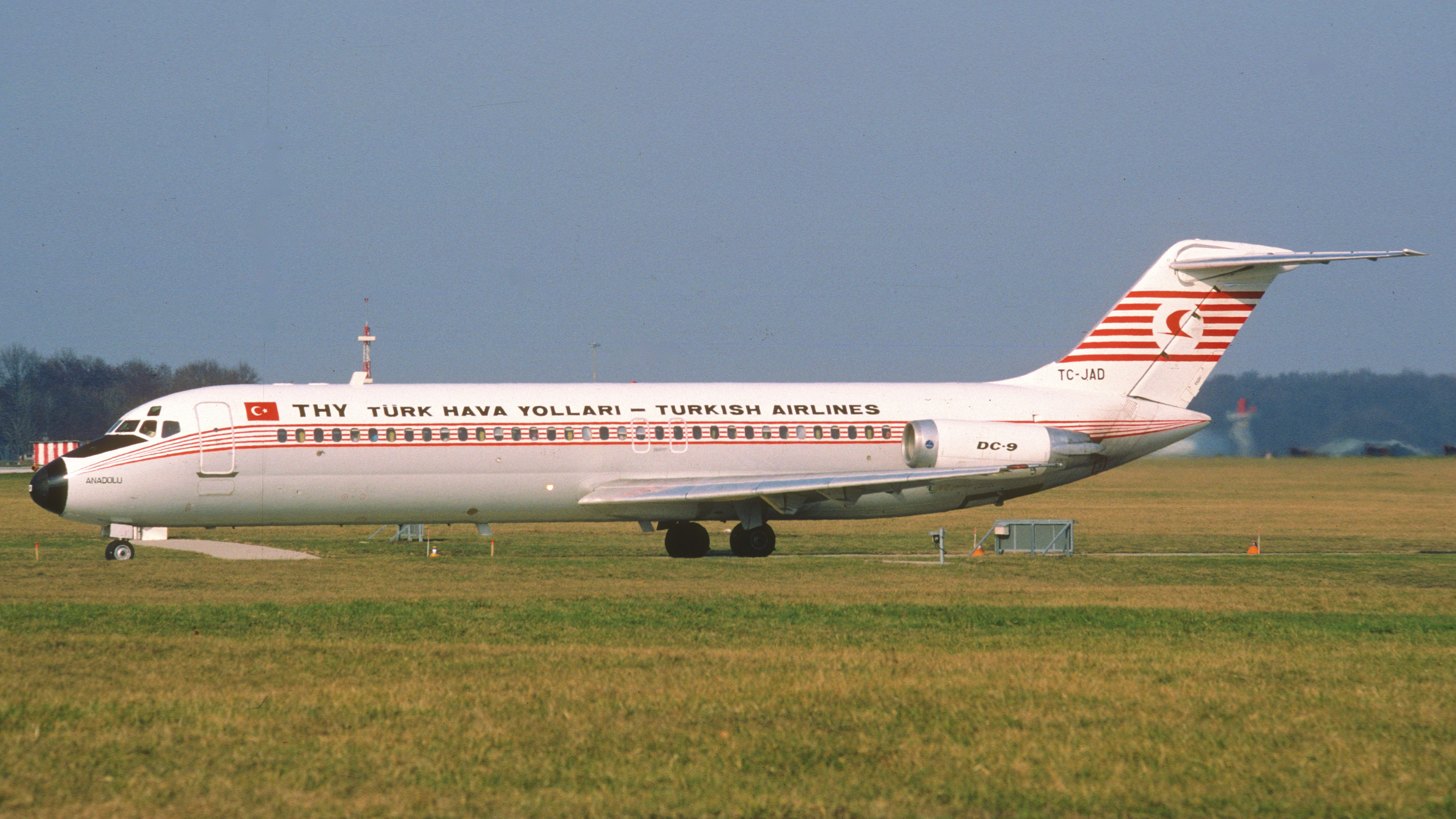
McDonnell Douglas DC-9s were the first jet aircraft of the airline.

From 1959 onwards, major airports in Turkey were overhauled to be able to accommodate jet-engined aircraft. In 1965, Turkish Airlines started a search for a jet aircraft to expand its fleet. Four types were initially considered for evaluation: BAC One-Eleven, Hawker Siddeley Trident, McDonnell Douglas DC-9 and Sud Aviation Caravelle VI. The Caravelle was quickly ruled out as it had crashed in Ankara a few years prior. A Trident was wet leased from British European Airways for a brief period but was found to be insufficient. In later stages, the Soviet Tupolev Tu-134 was offered as well to the airline by its manufacturer. The management decided to order the McDonnell Douglas DC-9 in 1966. Management wanted to order three aircraft of the type, but ordered two and leased one instead due to financial restrictions. The leased Douglas DC-9-10 registered as TC-JAA joined the fleet next year and became the first jet-engined aircraft of Turkish Airlines, and was due to stay until the newly bought Douglas DC-9-30s were delivered. Initially, the idea was to have the plane registered as TC-NAZ, but this was later changed, with the "J" in the registration denoting that it was a jet-engined aircraft; this practice was used in later aircraft as well. One Douglas DC-7 was also leased from Sweden for a single year to meet the increasing passenger demand. The next year, the carrier received two Douglas DC-9-30 aircraft. Two more Douglas DC-9s were added to the fleet in 1969, followed by an additional four in 1970. In 1971, the Vickers Viscounts were removed from the fleet. In the same year, three Boeing 707s were leased to meet the increasing demand.

=== Wide-body operations and all-jet fleet ===
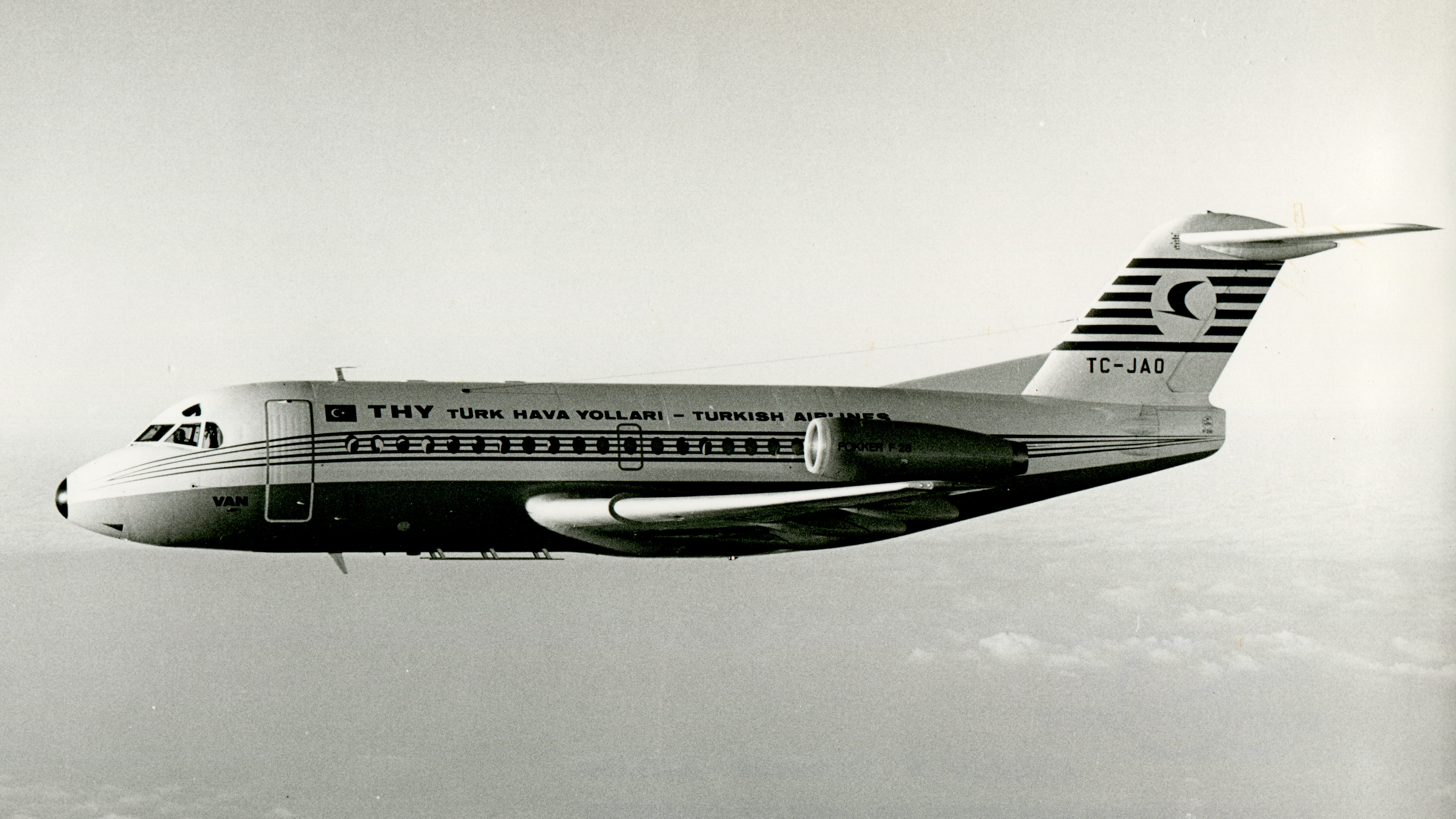
Three of the five Fokker F28 Fellowships crashed (aircraft pictured as Flight 301).

A commission of Turkish Airlines released a report to choose the first wide-body aircraft of the airline in December 1971. In the report, the Douglas DC-10-10 was ranked the highest, the Lockheed L-1011 TriStar was second, while the Airbus A300 came third. A final report in July 1972 advised against the L-1011 TriStar due to its existing engine problems. Talks with McDonnell Douglas began in August. In the same month, Lockheed Corporation sent Turkish Airlines an offer for the L-1011 TriStar. A committee from the manufacturer arrived at Istanbul to discuss a potential order. The discussion on 25 August resulted in the price of the planes being lowered to 17 million dollars per unit. Its competitor, the Douglas DC-10-10, had an earlier delivery date but was 900,000 dollars more expensive per unit. On 25 September 1972, the general directorate placed an order for three Douglas DC-10-10s.

Between 1972 and 1973, five Fokker F28 Fellowships were added to the fleet, with an additional aircraft of the type being temporarily leased from Fokker for 42 days. The Fokker F28s were bought for regional flights to airports with a short runway that were unable to accommodate the larger jets operated by the airline. To pay for the new F28s, the carrier sold all of its Fokker F27s back to the Netherlands, which were the final propeller aircraft remaining in the fleet. This resulted in the airline operating an all-jet fleet by the early 1970s. The leased Douglas DC-9-10 stayed in the fleet until 1973. Four Boeing 727 aircraft joined a year later in 1974. Three of the Fokker F28 Fellowships were declared hull losses after being involved in fatal accidents in 1974, 1975 and 1979, while the two remaining aircraft later crashed as Air Ontario Flight 1363 and Iran Aseman Airlines Flight 746. Between 1969 and 1975, the number of aircraft of Turkish Airlines increased from 16 to 21.

=== 1980s ===
By 1984, Turkish Airlines had three de Havilland Canada Dash 7, five Boeing 707s, two Fokker F28 Fellowship, nine Douglas DC-9s, nine Boeing 727s, and two Douglas DC-10 aircraft. The fleet was made up of unrelated planes which weren't able to meet the demand of the flight network Turkish Airlines had. In the 1980s, the airline made plans to order the Airbus A310, Boeing 757 or Boeing 767, with the Minister of Transport and Infrastructure Veysel Atasoy leading the negotiations. The Airbus A310 had more cargo capacity and Airbus provided a discount, which led to the type being chosen. Initially, the Board wanted to place a firm order for three and have two options, but this was later increased to seven of each. Four Airbus A310s joined the fleet in 1985, followed by three more in 1988. Within seven years, a total of 14 Airbus A310s were added to the fleet. The de Havilland Canada Dash 7s were returned to their lessors after their contracts ended in 1986, marking the end of propeller aircraft operations of the airline. In 1987, the Douglas DC-10, Fokker F28, as well as two Boeing 707 aircraft were transferred to the newly formed subsidiary Boğaziçi Hava Taşımacılığı (BHT) to standardize the fleet of Turkish Airlines. From 1988 to 1989, plans were made to make changes to the fleet in order increase the productivity of the aircraft. The main idea was to decrease the number of types operated.

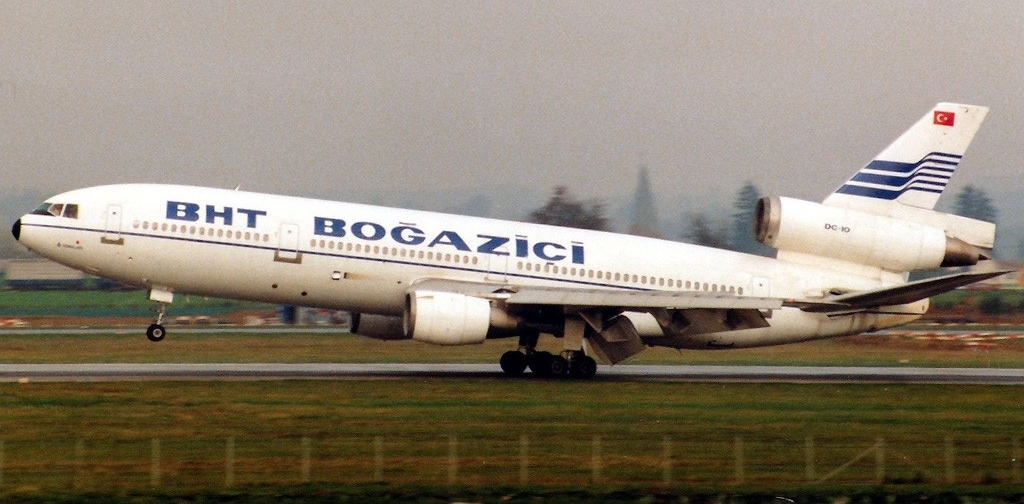
The carrier wanted to remove the McDonnell Douglas DC-10 from its fleet by the late 1980s before moving them to Boğaziçi Hava Taşımacılığı.

The company wanted to remove the Douglas DC-10-10s, still operated by BHT, as soon as possible since they often had faults which were difficult to fix, and their large capacity made them difficult to fill during the winter. Additionally, if one were to have an extensive maintenance check, the flight network would become hampered as two aircraft would be needed to fill in for one DC-10. The demand for the type as a passenger aircraft was falling, but cargo variants still had customers. The first and only airline interested in the two planes was FedEx, which eventually bought the planes and a spare engine. As a replacement for the DC-10, the Board of Directors considered the McDonnell Douglas MD-11 and Airbus A340, both of which were in the development phase. Turgut Özal, the 8th President of Turkey, wanted the airline to have the Boeing 747-400, and the Ministry of Transport and Infrastructure sent an official letter asking for the type to be evaluated. The board came to the conclusion that adding the 747 would hurt the company even more, as the seasonal traffic of the airline meant that the type wouldn't hit the 80–90% load factor needed to break-even during the low season.

=== 1990s ===
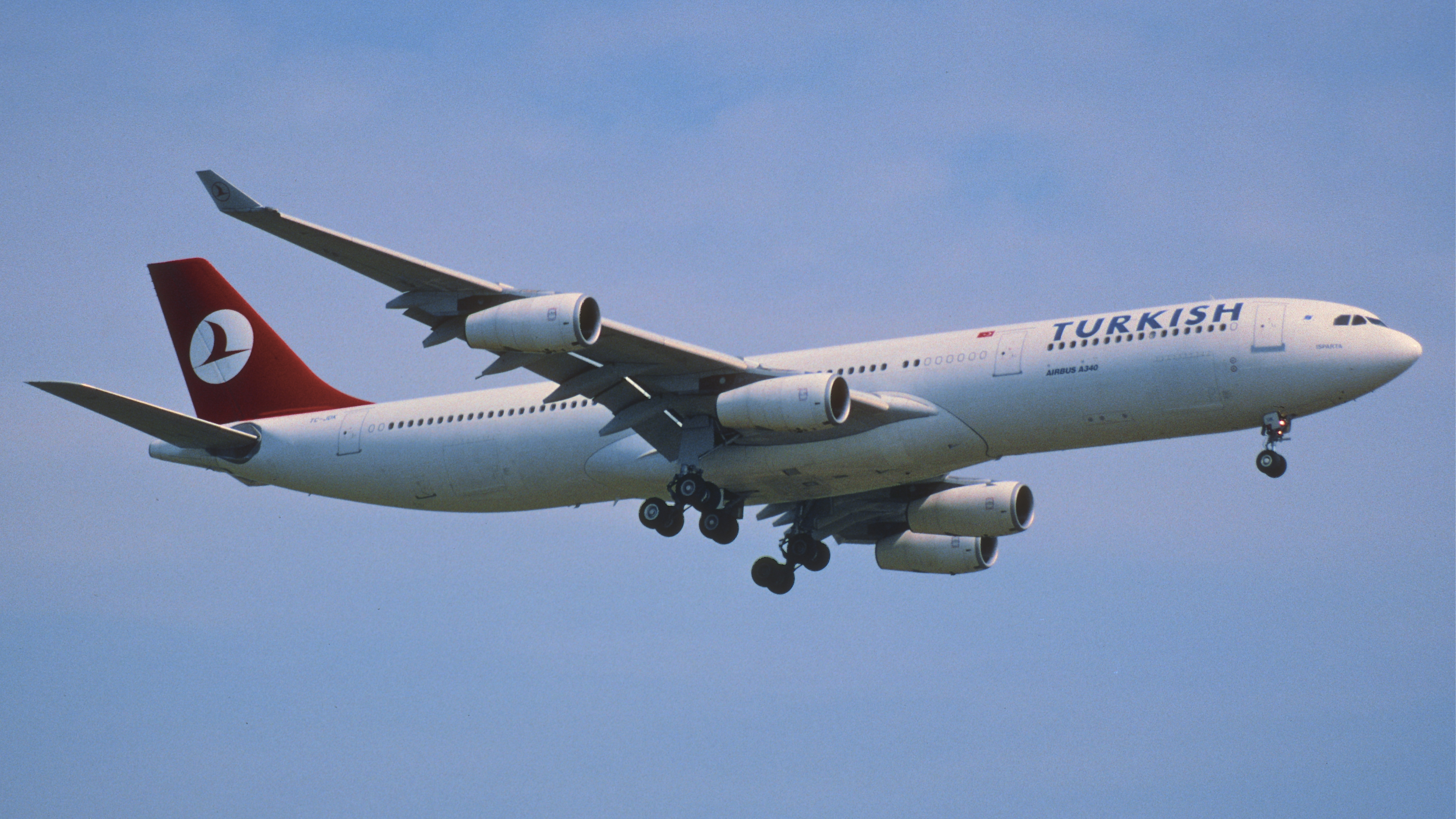
The Airbus A340 was chosen over the McDonnell Douglas MD-11 and ordered in 1990.

The result of the fleet planning made during the previous decade showed its results in the 1990s. In January 1990, an internal commission set up to decide on the replacement of the Douglas DC-10 did its final voting after several rounds, and the Airbus A340 was unanimously chosen instead of the McDonnell Douglas MD-11 due to its technical advantages and cost benefits. A few days later, CEO Cem Kozlu explained the decision to Turgut Özal, who only accepted it after Kozlu became a guarantor. Özal brought up the Boeing 747 again several months later, when the Gulf War started. Kuwait Airways had four aircraft of the type, which were stored in Egypt due to the conflict. He asked Kozlu to lease the type until the conflict was resolved. By the time the complicated loan and insurance-related affairs had been arranged, the conflict had turned into a war, and plans were abandoned.

Around the same time, the commission also had to decide between the Boeing 737 Classics and the Airbus A320, with the latter being favoured by a slim margin. In the end, the Boeing 737 was chosen because the Airbus A320 had later delivery dates and new technical features that were difficult to fix in case a plane broke down at airports in Anatolia without adequate technical infrastructure. The company also didn't want to drift completely away from Boeing, with the majority of the airline's orders going to Airbus around that time. An additional two Airbus A310s were delivered to the airline in 1990 and 1992, bringing the number of aircraft in its fleet to 32. The Boeing 737 Classics were first delivered in 1991. A further six Boeing 737-400 and two smaller Boeing 737-500s joined the fleet a year later in 1992. The first Airbus A340-300 aircraft was delivered in 1993, which enabled the airline to fly to destinations in East Asia, such as Tokyo. The fourth A340, registered TC-JDM, would become famous in the country for its strange unreliability, and was nicknamed Deli Mike.

Turkish Airlines received its first Avro RJ100 aircraft in July 1993, with Prince Charles in attendance. With its four engines, the aircraft was used to fly domestic flights to East and Southeast Anatolia, where most airports had short runways. After being satisfied with the aircraft, the airline ordered five more RJ100s and four RJ70s, the shorter variant, in 1995. RJ70 aircraft were bought because of their modified landing gear that allowed the type to land on unpaved runways, which made it possible for the airline to carry soldiers of the Turkish Army. The initial problems with the engines leaking oil were fixed with modifications made by Turkish Technic. The Boeing 727s, all of which were converted to cargo aircraft, were retired from the fleet in 1996. During Turkish president Süleyman Demirel's visit to France in February 1998, Turkish Airlines ordered two additional Airbus A340s, bringing the total to seven aircraft of the type. In November 1998, the airline added six Boeing 737-800, a Next Generation variant, to its fleet. The planes landed back to back at Atatürk Airport on 2 November, making it the first time in Turkish aviation history that six aircraft were delivered on the same day. The first plane on approach made a go-around, which is a tradition. By 1999, the total number of aircraft in the fleet had risen to 75.

=== 2000s ===
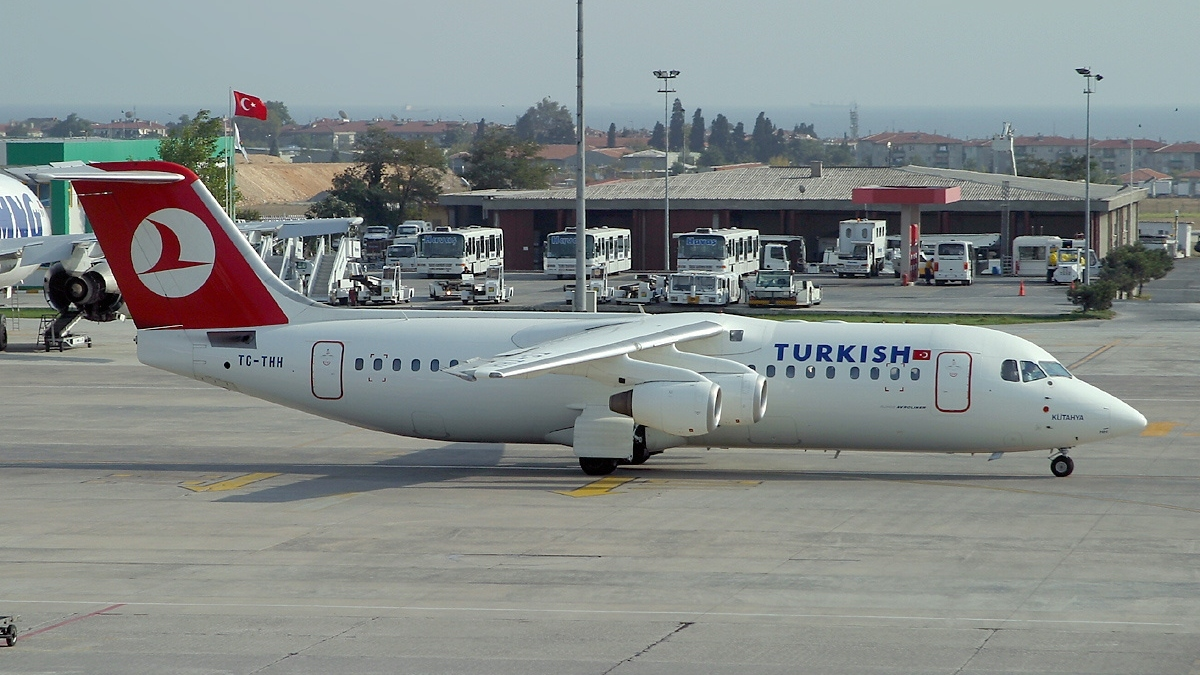
Avro RJs of Turkish Airlines were removed from the fleet in 2006 with a ceremony.

Seven Airbus A310s and three Boeing 727s were put up for sale. One of each type was sold by 2001. In 2000, one option for the Airbus A340 was turned into a firm order. From 2000 to 2002, the airline received 11 Boeing 737-800 aircraft. Turkish Airlines sold six Airbus A310s to Iran Air around 2002. Later that year in September, Mahan Air bought seven Airbus A310s from the carrier. In 2004, Turkish Airlines announced an order for five Airbus A330, 19 Airbus A320 and 12 Airbus A321 aircraft. Throughout 2004 and 2005, the airline ordered 23 Boeing 737-800 aircraft. The deliveries were completed in late 2008. Much older aircraft like 11 Avro RJs, five Boeing 737-400 and two Boeing 737-500 aircraft were removed from the fleet. Three passenger Airbus A310 aircraft were converted into freighters. The Avro RJs were planned to be removed in late 2003 specifically due to their low capacity and high operating costs. The ten-year leasing deal ended in May 2004 for several aircraft. During a regular maintenance check on the second aircraft before being sent back, signs of corrosion were found inside the fuel tanks, which led to the seven other Avro RJ aircraft still operating in the fleet being grounded. The final Avro RJ left the fleet in December 2006. A camel was slaughtered at the Turkish Technic maintenance hangar in Atatürk Airport during the farewell ceremony to celebrate the removal of the type. The number of aircraft in the fleet reached 100 in that same year.

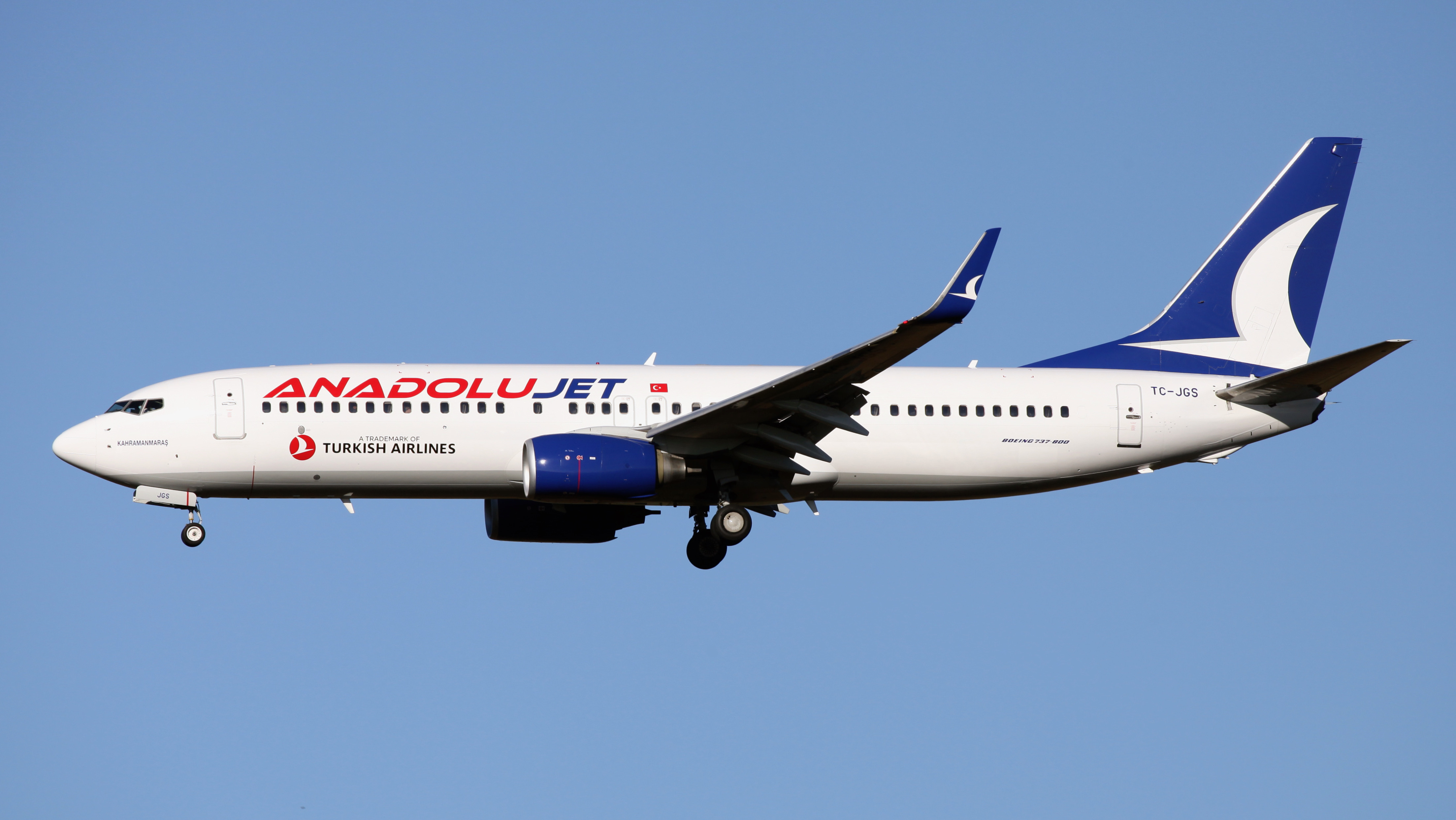
Founded in 2008, AnadoluJet is a trademark of Turkish Airlines.

Having almost doubled its fleet size from 65 to 120 in five years and not ordered any aircraft since 2005, Hürriyet reported in October 2008 that the airline was planning to order up to 25 wide-body and 50 narrow-body aircraft. The Airbus A330 aircraft ordered four years prior only replaced older Airbus A310 aircraft, meaning that Turkish Airlines didn't have a significant growth in its long-haul fleet. The carrier also leased four Boeing 737-700 aircraft to replace the older 737-400 variant, which didn't have its leasing agreement renewed. In addition, a total of 21 leased aircraft joined the fleet in 2008, with the majority being the Airbus A320 family and Boeing 737 Next Generation aircraft, but also four wide-bodies. In April 2008, the airline founded AnadoluJet as a trademark and transferred five of its Boeing 737-400s to it. AnadoluJet is not a separate company and operates under Turkish Airlines. By November 2008, the airline had converted three of its Airbus A310s into freighters. Two planes of the type were sold to Ariana Afghan Airlines in April 2009. Turkish Airlines leased three Boeing 777-300ER aircraft from Jet Airways in December 2008. In April 2009, Turkish Airlines announced that it had ordered five Boeing 777-300ER aircraft. In July the same year, additional seven aircraft were ordered, bringing the total to 12. In November 2009, the airline ordered three Airbus A330-300 aircraft, bringing the total number ordered to ten. Turkish Airlines also signed a memorandum of understanding with Airbus for two Airbus A330-200F freighters.

=== 2010s ===
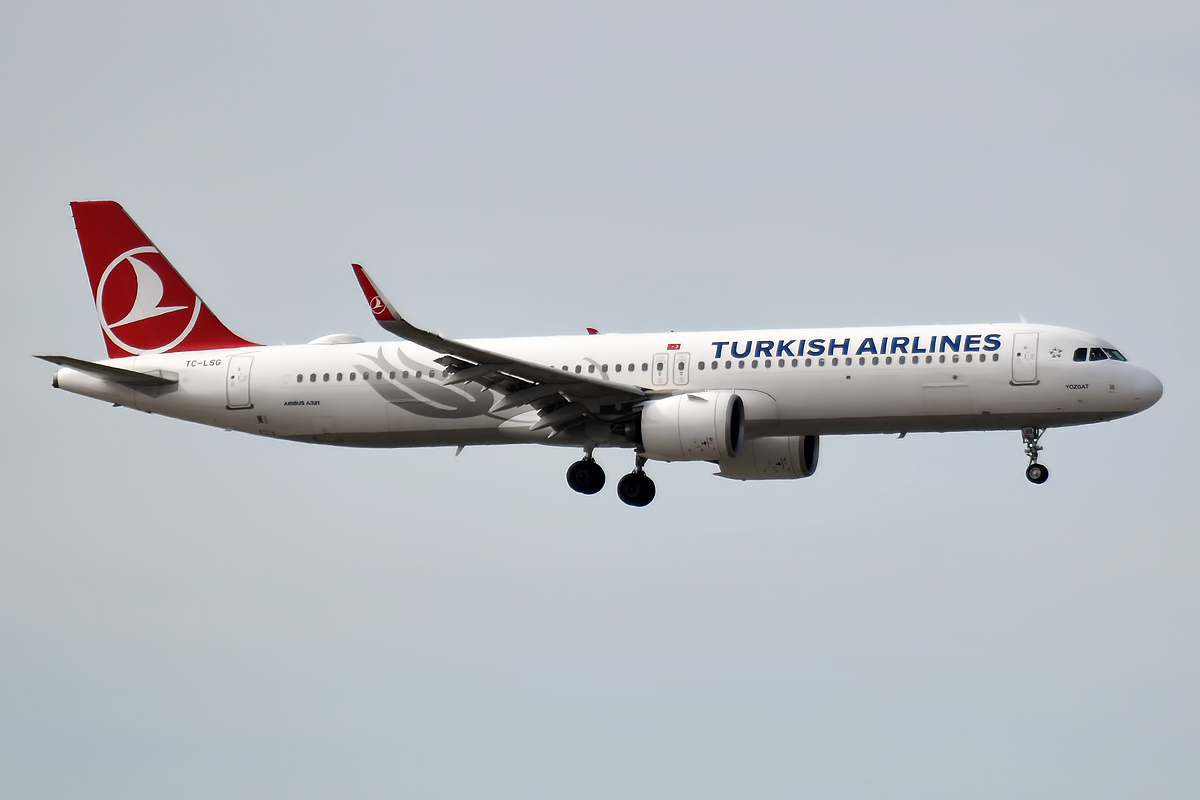
The first neo aircraft were ordered in 2013.

In October 2010, Turkish Airlines announced an order for 14 Airbus A321-200 and six Airbus A319-100 aircraft. A month later, the airline announced an order for ten Boeing 737-800 and ten Boeing 737-900ER planes, with an option for 15 more aircraft. In March 2011, the airline ordered an additional ten Airbus A321-200 and three Airbus A330-200F aircraft. Its 200th aircraft was a Boeing 737-900ER and joined the fleet in 2012. In March 2013, the airline announced an order for 117 Airbus aircraft, which became the largest order placed by a Turkish airline. The order included 25 Airbus A321-200, four Airbus A320neo and 53 Airbus A321neo aircraft as well as an option for 35 further A321neos. The next month, Turkish Airlines placed a firm order for 20 Boeing 737-800, 40 Boeing 737 MAX 8 and ten Boeing 737 MAX 9 aircraft. The order also included an option for 25 more 737 MAX 8s. Of the options, 15 were turned into firm orders in June 2014. In December 2014, the A320neo orders were converted into A321neos, and eight A321neo options were turned into firm orders. In December 2015, the carrier ordered an additional 20 Airbus A321neo aircraft, bringing the total amount ordered to 92.

During the winter period following the 2016 Turkish coup attempt, the airline saw a heavy downfall in passenger numbers, which caused it to ground 30 aircraft. On 14 February 2017, Turkish Airlines announced that it had reached an agreement with Boeing to convert its order for two Boeing 777-300ER aircraft to Boeing 777-200F, the freighter variant. In September 2017, Turkish Airlines signed a letter of intent to purchase 25 Boeing 787-9 aircraft, which included an option for further five. Both 777 freighters were delivered to the airline in December 2017. At the end of the same month, three more 777Fs were ordered. In January 2018, the airline signed a memorandum of understanding with Airbus to acquire 25 Airbus A350-900 aircraft and five options. The Boeing 787 and Airbus A350 deal was finalized two months later and the airline officially ordered the two types in March 2018. On 25 November 2018, the airline ordered three more Boeing 777 freighter aircraft. As of December 2018, the airline owned 37 of the 330 aircraft it operated, with the rest being leased. Of the leased aircraft, 207 were on long-term and 87 were on short-term contracts. Throughout 2018, 11 aircraft of the Airbus A320 family had extensive cabin renewals, while 12 Boeing 737-800s were transferred to subsidiary AnadoluJet.

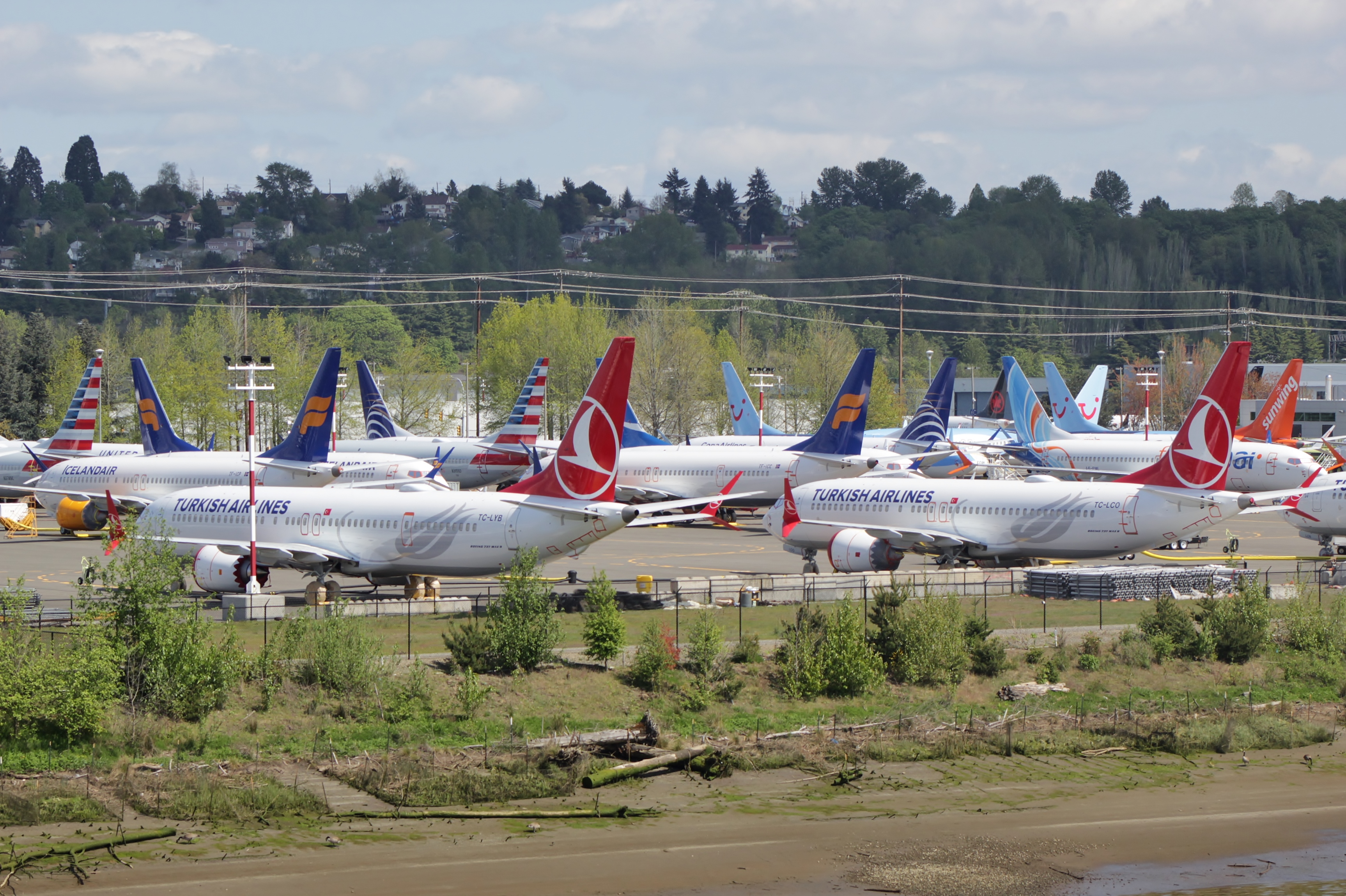
Turkish Airlines had its Boeing 737 MAX aircraft grounded.

On 12 March 2019, following the request of the Directorate General of Civil Aviation, Turkish Airlines grounded all of its 12 Boeing 737 MAX aircraft. Some aircraft that departed a few hours before the decision had to return to Istanbul Atatürk Airport. Turkish Airlines also did not take delivery of a further 12 737 MAX aircraft due to the global grounding, causing the planes to be stored at the Boeing Field. The final Airbus A340-300 left the fleet in April 2019. On 26 June 2019, the airline received its first Boeing 787-9 registered TC-LLA. The aircraft was welcomed at Istanbul Airport with a ceremony attended by Turkish media. The first commercial flight with the type was flown on 8 July to Trabzon Airport. In August 2019, Turkish Airlines chairman İlker Aycı stated that the carrier was looking into receiving its orders of long-haul aircraft, such as the Airbus A350-900, earlier than planned. In addition, he said that the airline was interested in the Airbus A220 and Embraer E190/E195 to serve new destinations. On 31 December 2019, it was reported that Turkish Airlines received a compensation of around $225 million from Boeing due to the 737 MAX groundings.

=== 2020s ===
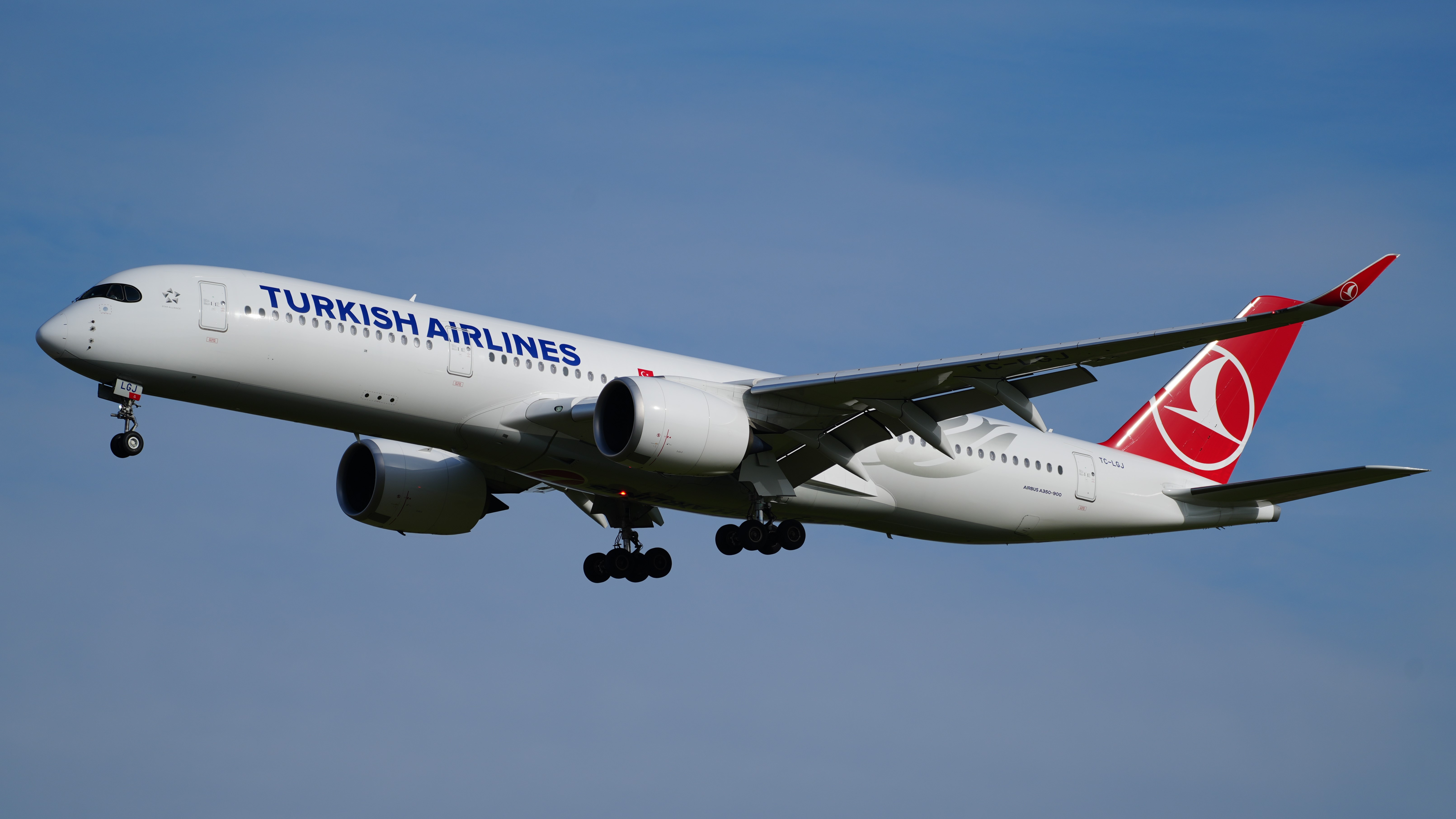
An Airbus A350-900. New generation aircraft like this are to replace older aircraft, such as the Airbus A330

Due to the reduction in air traffic caused by the COVID-19 pandemic, chairman İlker Aycı told Hürriyet on 27 May 2020 that the airline might delay the deliveries of new wide-body aircraft. The airline received its first Airbus A350-900 in October 2020, while the aircraft was completed almost a year before delivery. At the end of 2020, the airline grounded 25 wide-body and 55 narrow-body aircraft due to the start of the winter, but later grounded a further 21 Boeing 737-800 aircraft, which increased the total number of grounded Turkish Airlines aircraft to over 100. Turkish Airlines started using its Boeing 737 MAX aircraft again on 12 April 2021, with a domestic flight from Istanbul Airport to Ankara Esenboğa Airport. Three days after the re-introduction however, Turkish Airlines cancelled an order for 10 737 MAX 8 aircraft and turned 35 firm orders for 737 MAX 8 and 5 firm orders for 737 MAX 9 into options which had to be activated before 21 December 2021, leaving a total of 20 firm orders for 737 MAX 8 and 5 firm orders for 737 MAX 9. The airline is also continuing to return Airbus A330-200 aircraft to lessors to simplify its fleet.

On 12 January 2022, the airline received its 20th and final Boeing 737 MAX 8 it had directly ordered from Boeing. In April 2022, the carrier announced that it was going to lease seven Boeing 737 MAX 8 aircraft to join the fleet for the summer period. In May 2022, the carrier took delivery of an Airbus A350 that was originally destined for Aeroflot, which did not go through due to sanctions placed on the airline as the aftermath of the Russian invasion of Ukraine. Similarly, AnadoluJet took delivery of Airbus A320neo, A321neo and Boeing 737 MAX aircraft initially destined for S7 Airlines. The airline showed interest in the Airbus A220 and Embraer E190/E195 again before the 2022 Istanbul Airshow in October, where both manufacturers presented their planes. However, the carrier is hesitant to place an order for the types due their engines. Both aircraft use engines from the Pratt & Whitney PW1000G family. The Airbus A321neos of the airline already use the PW1100G, a member of the family which has had reliability problems. As of 2025, Turkish Airlines is the largest operator of the Airbus A330ceo.

Turkish Airlines received its 400th aircraft, an Airbus A350-900, in February 2023. In May, chairman Ahmet Bolat revealed that the airline was closing in on ordering 600 new aircraft from both Boeing and Airbus, which would be the largest ever if confirmed. 400 of these aircraft would be narrow-body while the other 200 would be wide. Bolat additionally said that the airline would operate over 800 airplanes by 2033. The order was supposed to be confirmed during the International Air Transport Association annual meeting held in Istanbul in June, but was delayed by two months due to the 2023 Turkish general election. The order was delayed once again in August, this time due to issues with engine options and the evaluation of maintenance contracts. In the meantime, the carrier announced that it had reached an agreement to lease 25 Boeing 737 MAX 8s and 3 Boeing 787-9s from AerCap in October and a further 20 narrow-bodies and one wide-body in November. In December, Turkish Airlines and Airbus announced that they had reached an agreement for a firm order of 220 aircraft and an option for further 125. The order included 150 A321neos, 50 A350-900s, 5 A350-900Fs and 15 A350-1000s. Turkish Airlines announced an order for up to 150 737 MAX airplanes, concluding the discussions initiated in 2025 and supporting the flag carrier's expansion goals.

== Current fleet ==
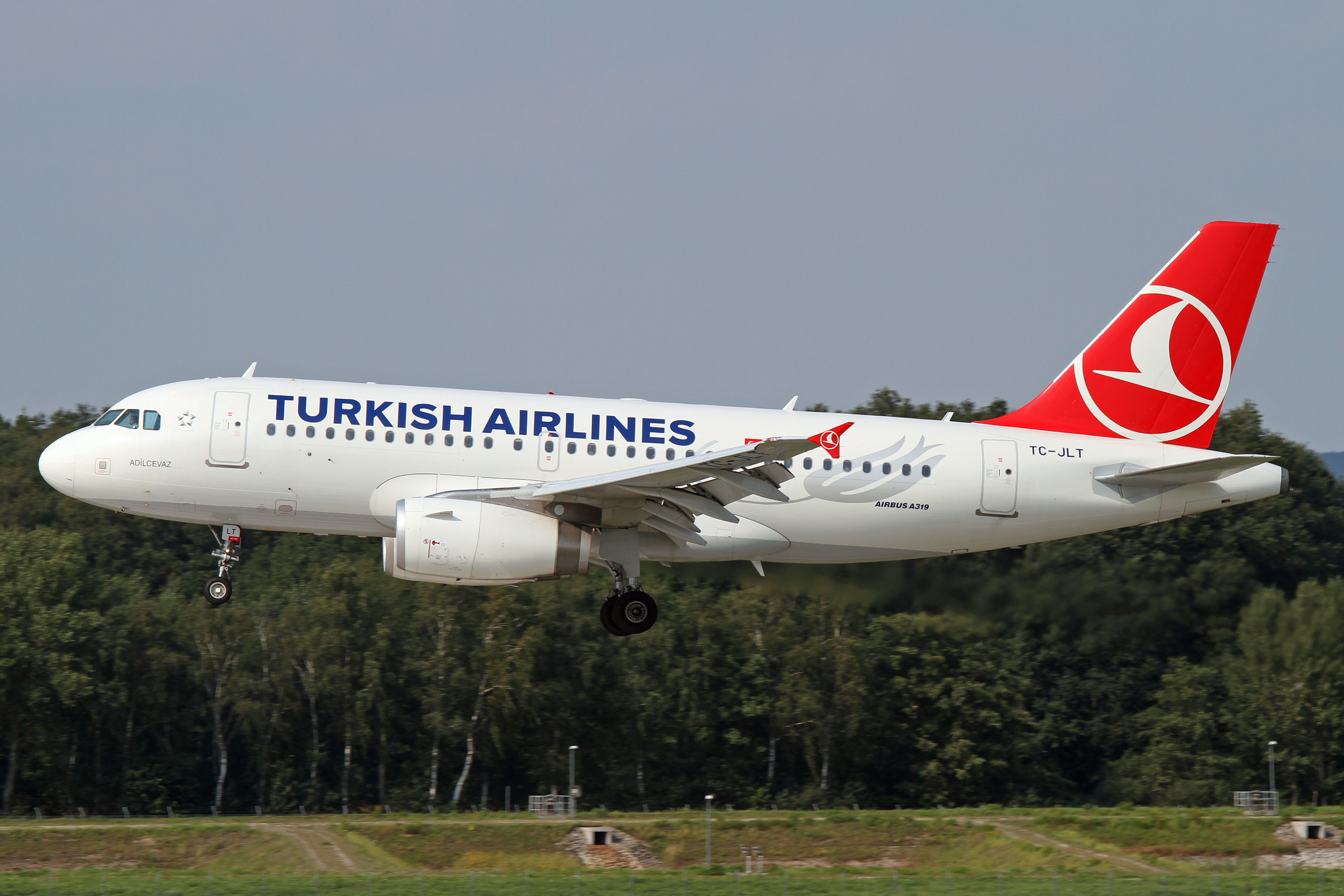
Airbus A319-100

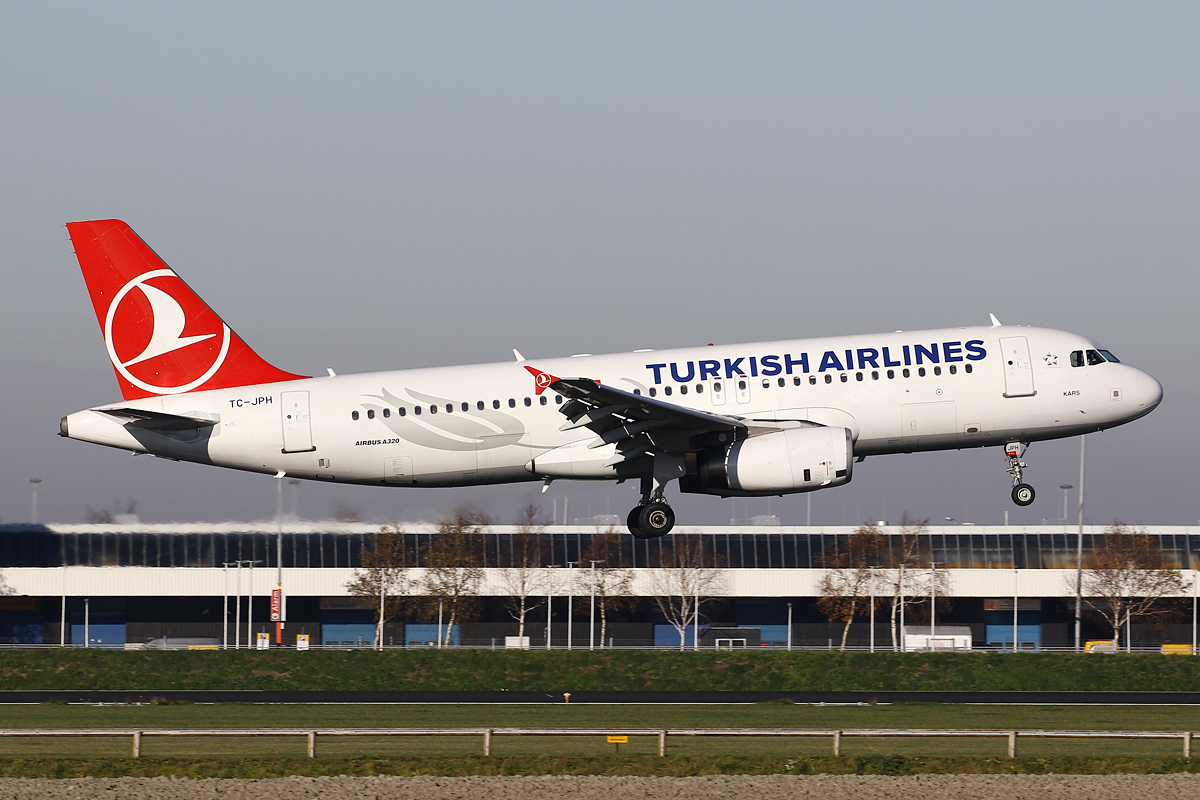
Airbus A320-200

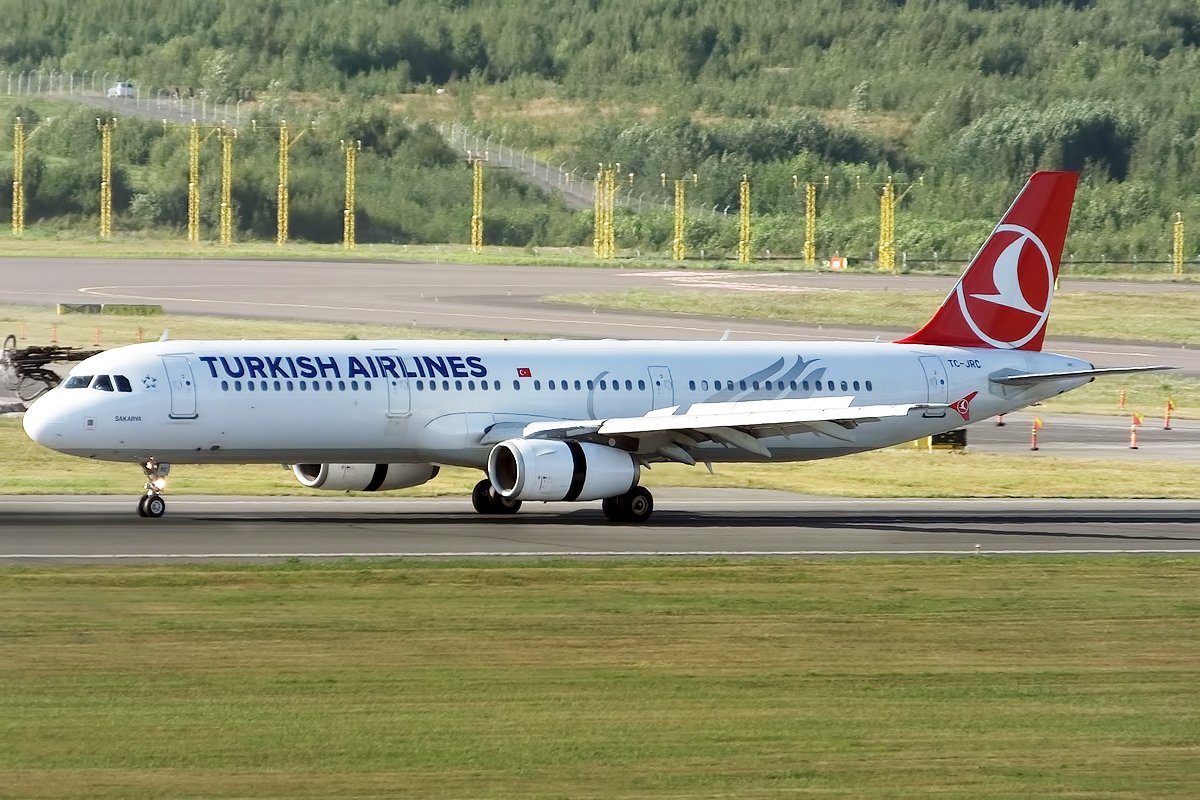
Airbus A321-200

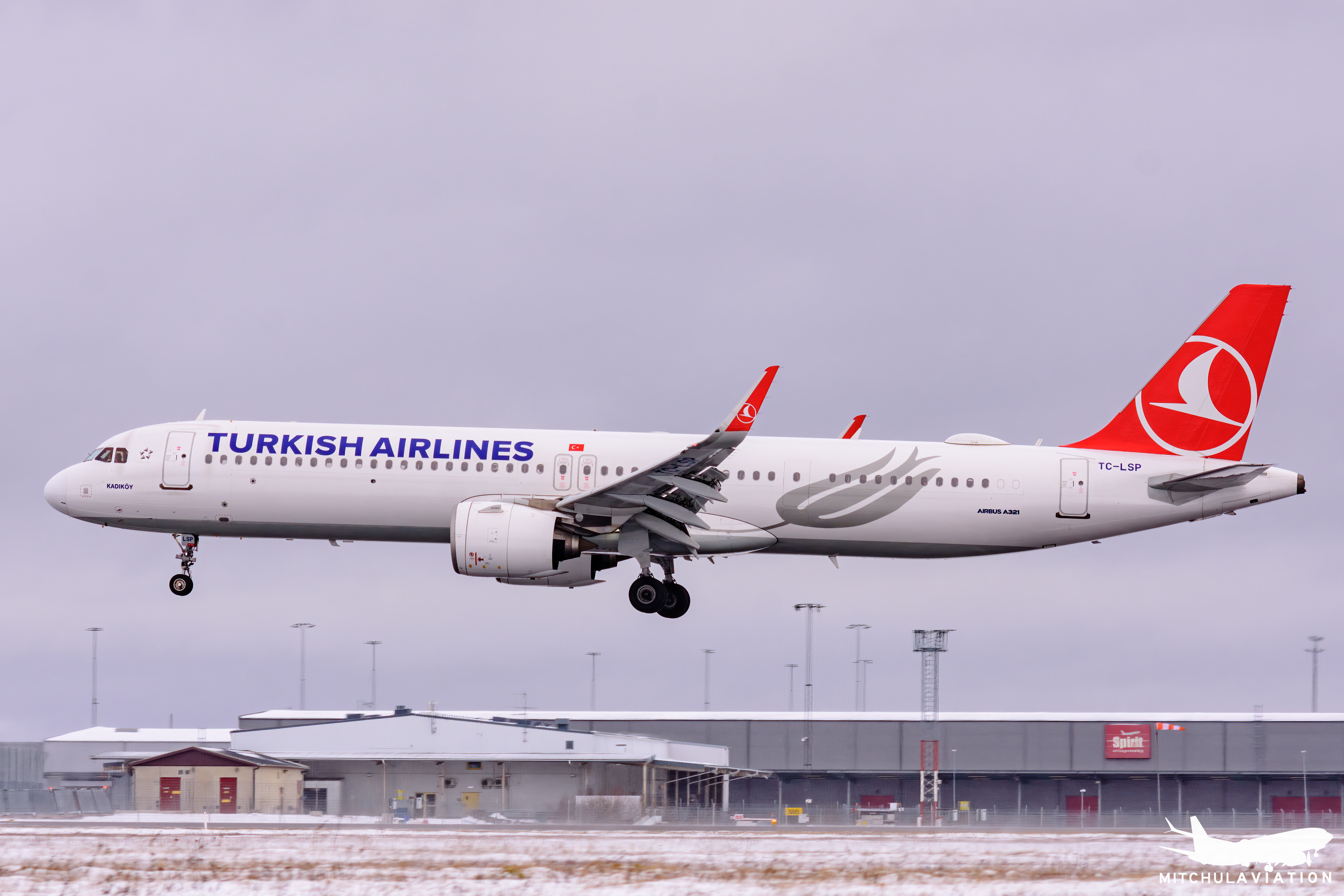
Airbus A321neo

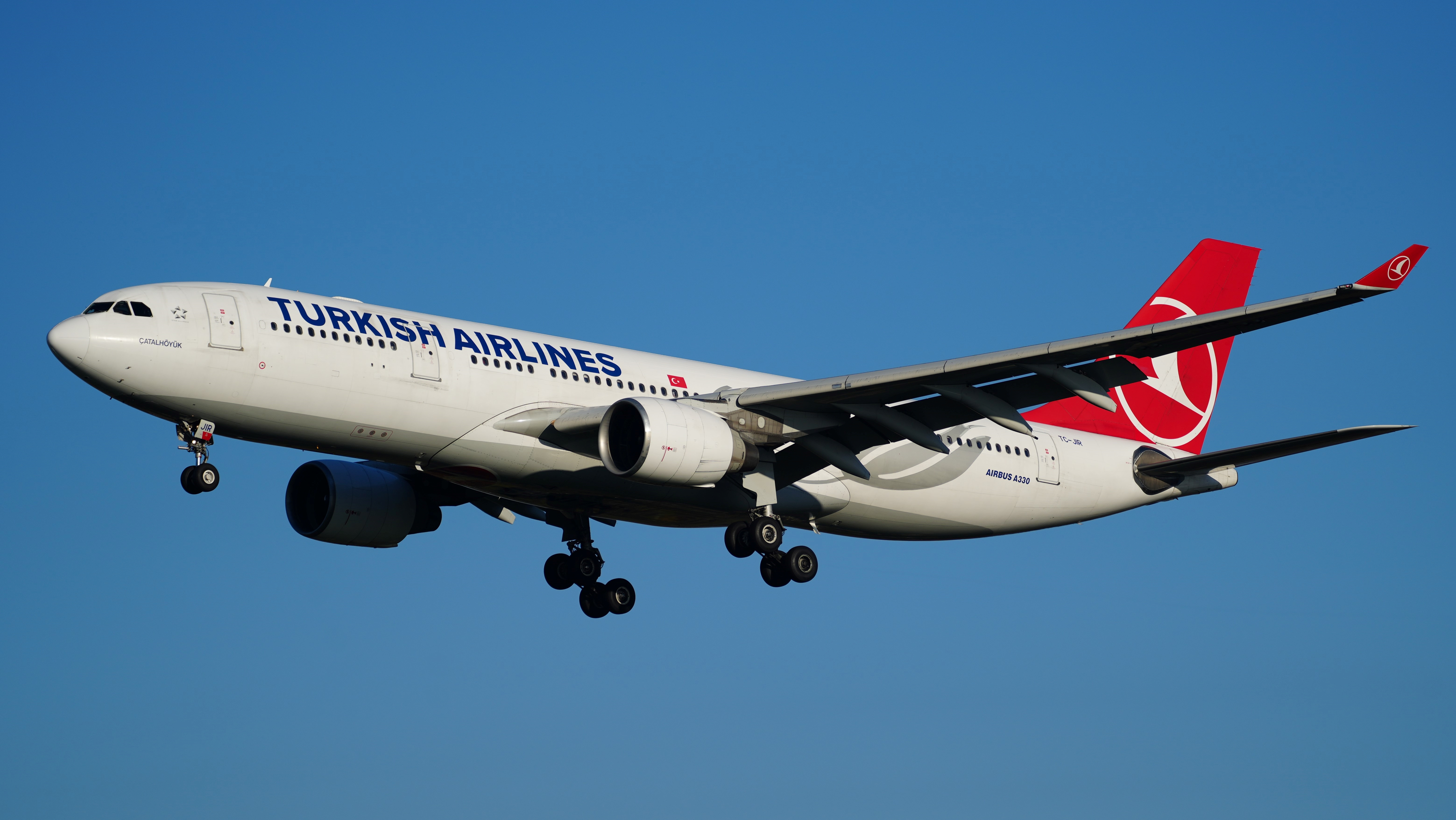
Airbus A330-200

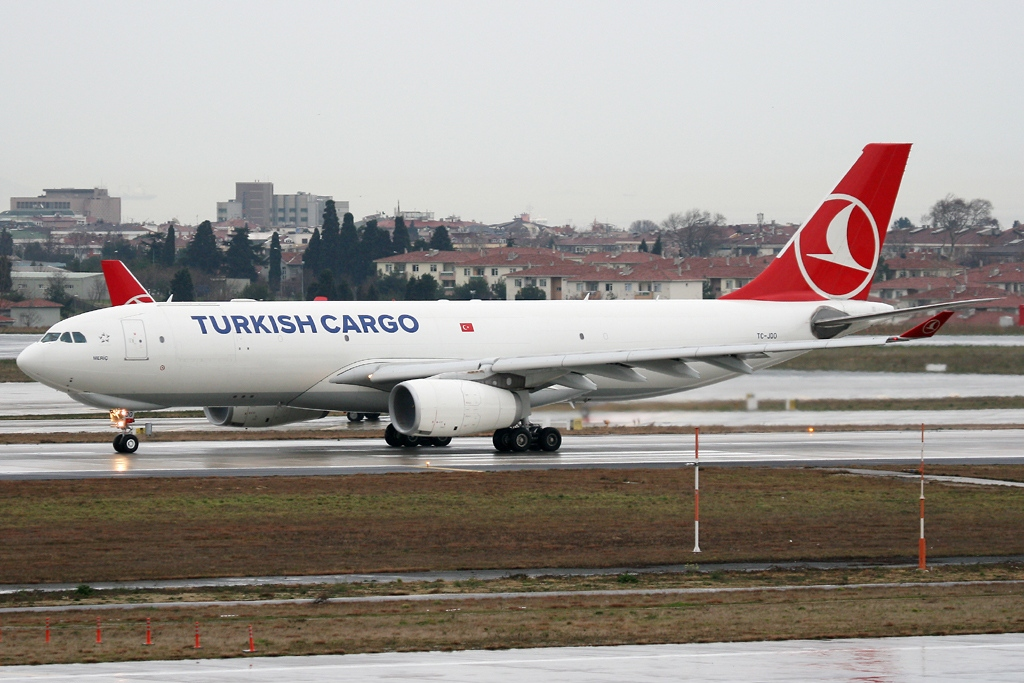
Airbus A330-200F

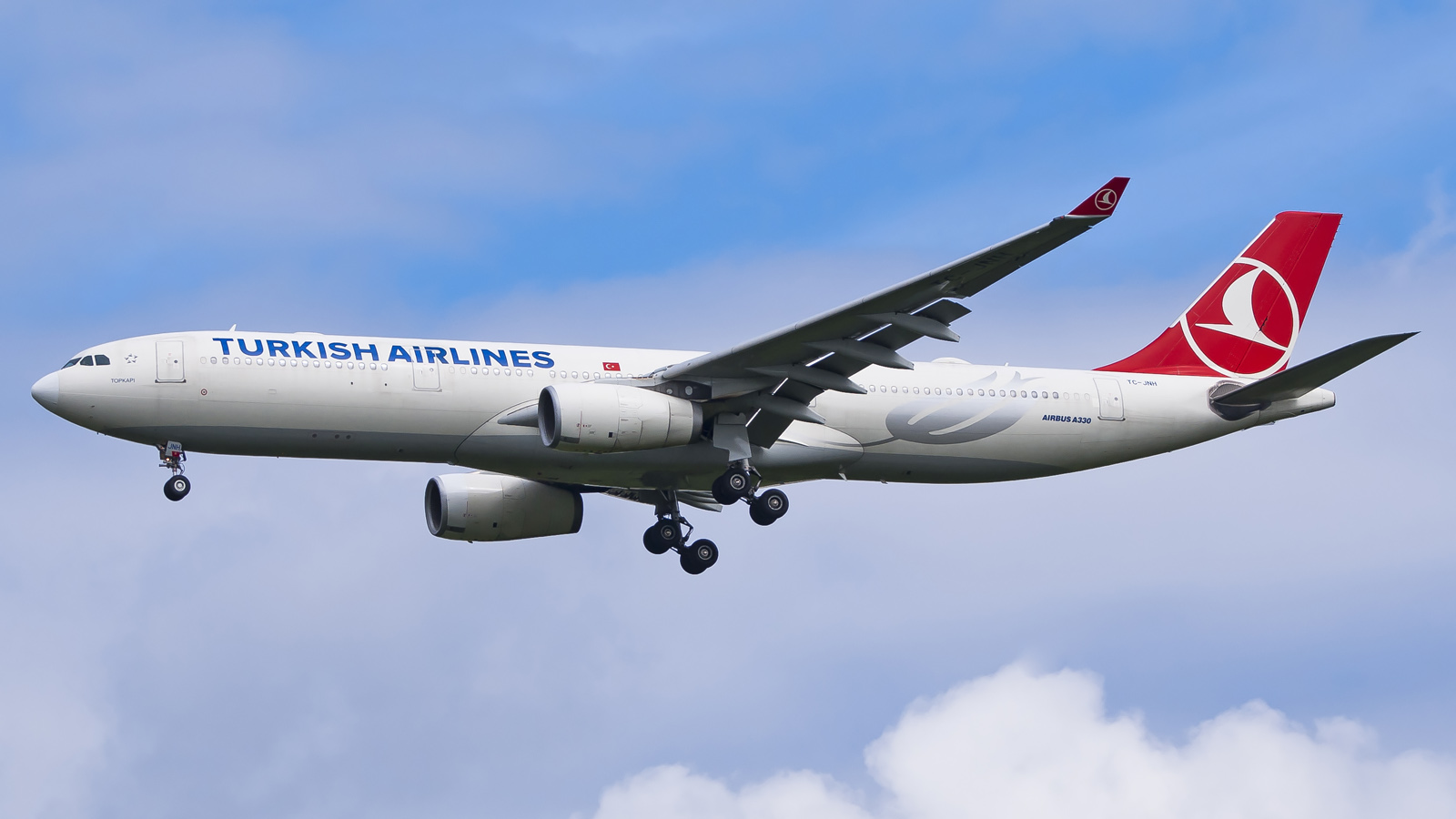
Airbus A330-300

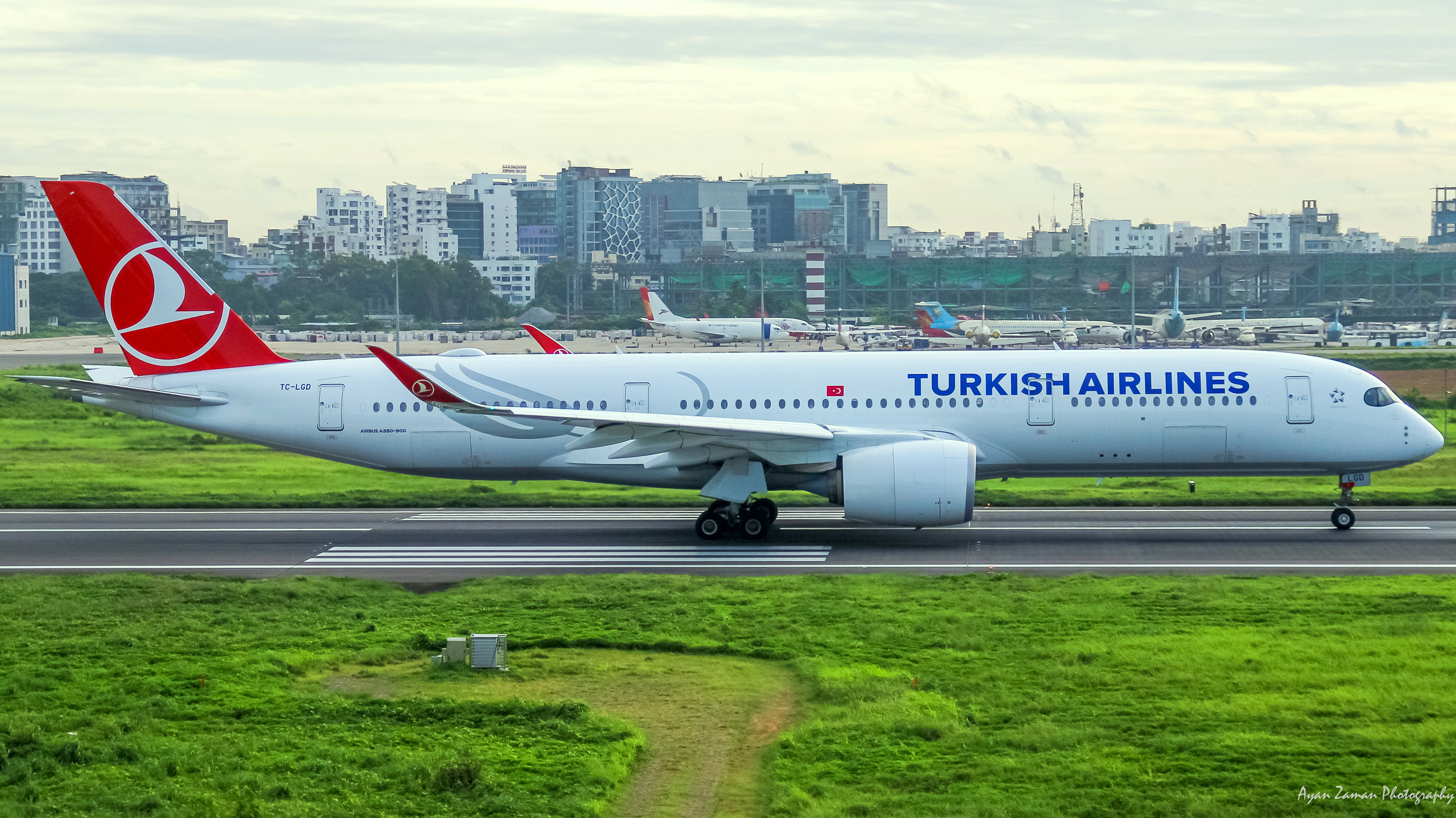
Airbus A350-900 XWB

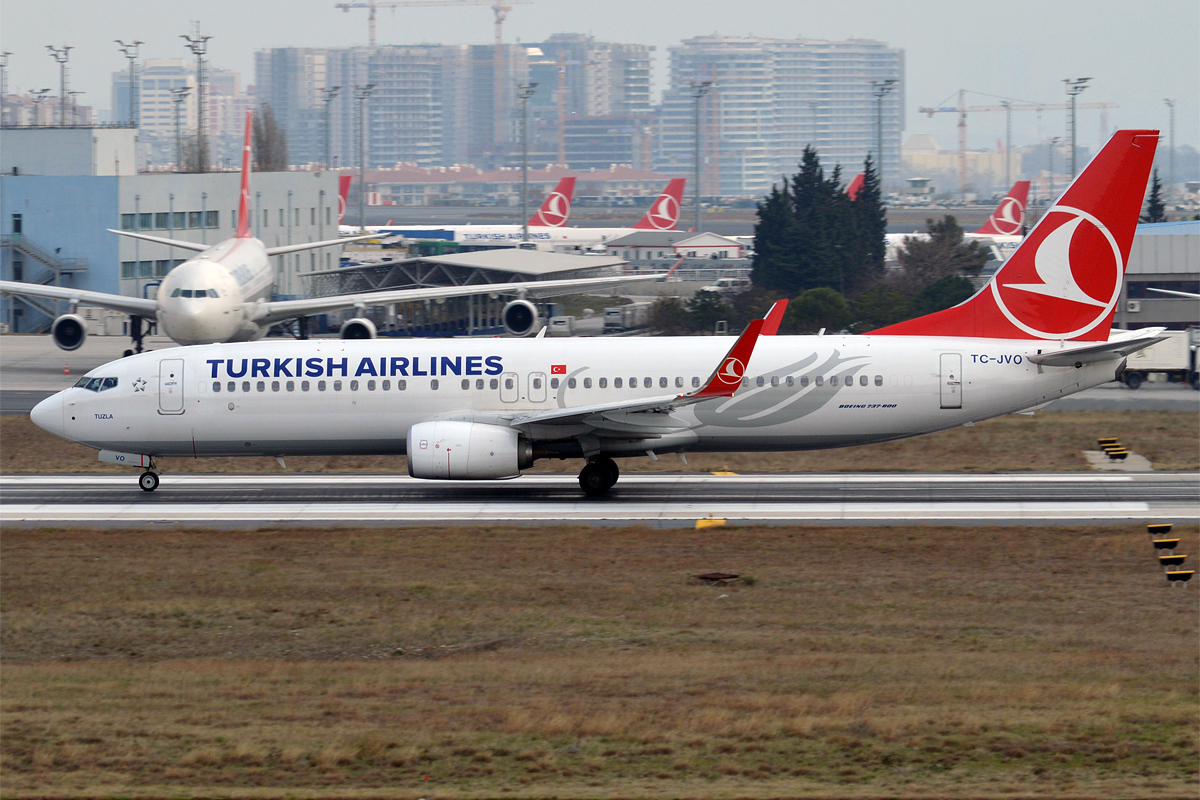
Boeing 737-800

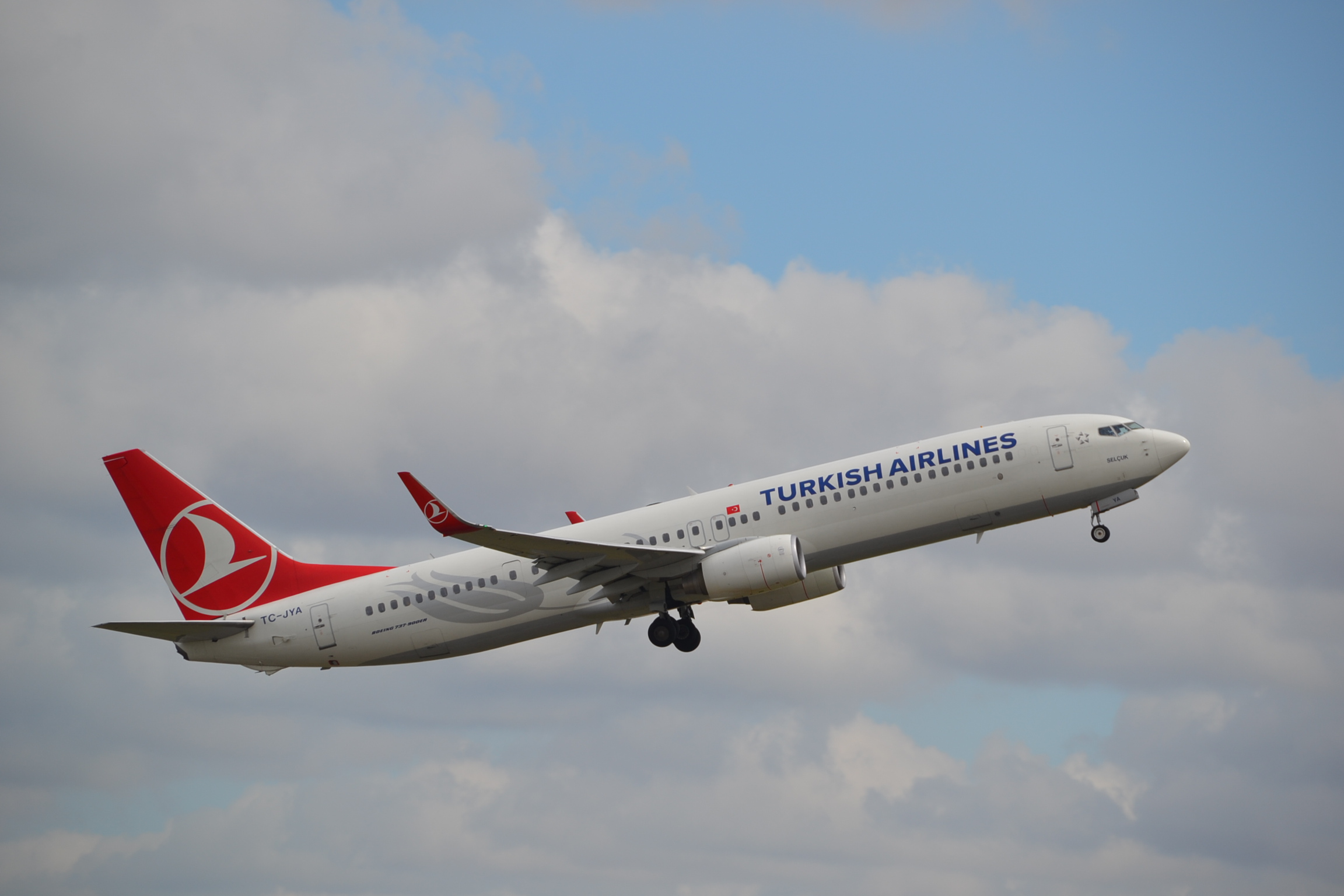
Boeing 737-900ER

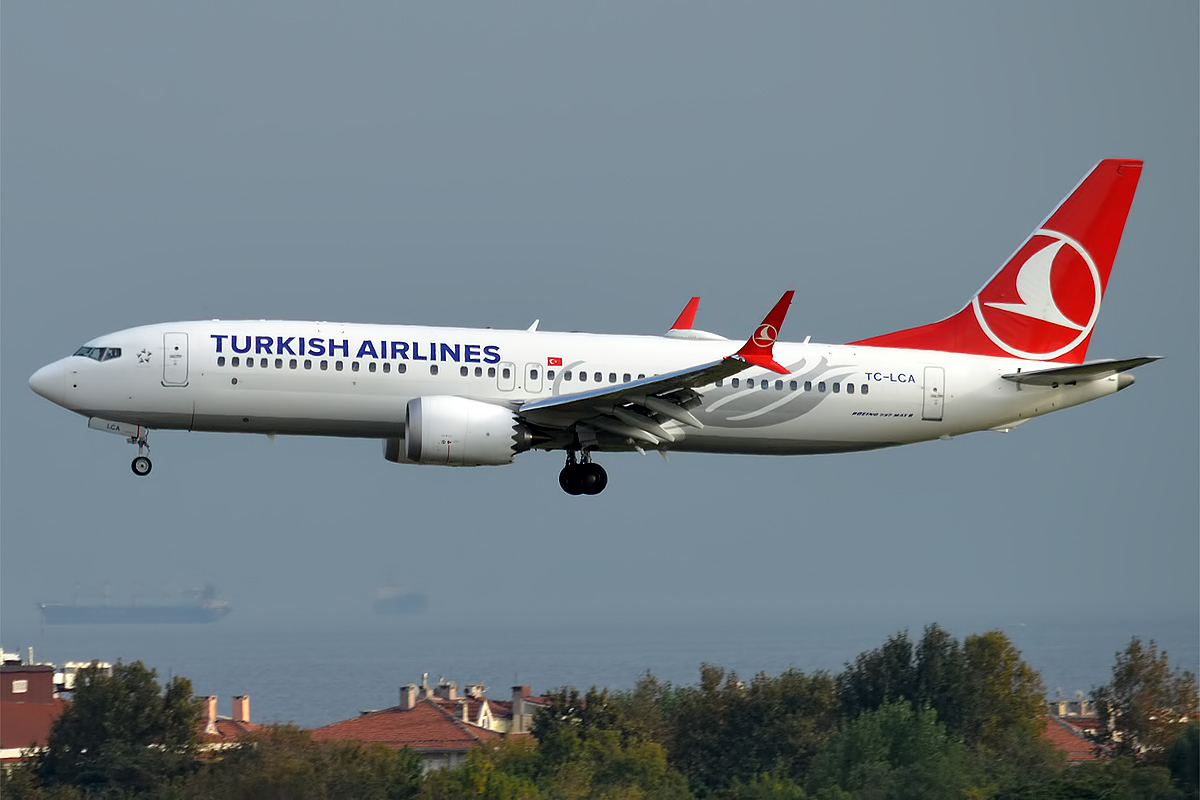
Boeing 737 MAX 8

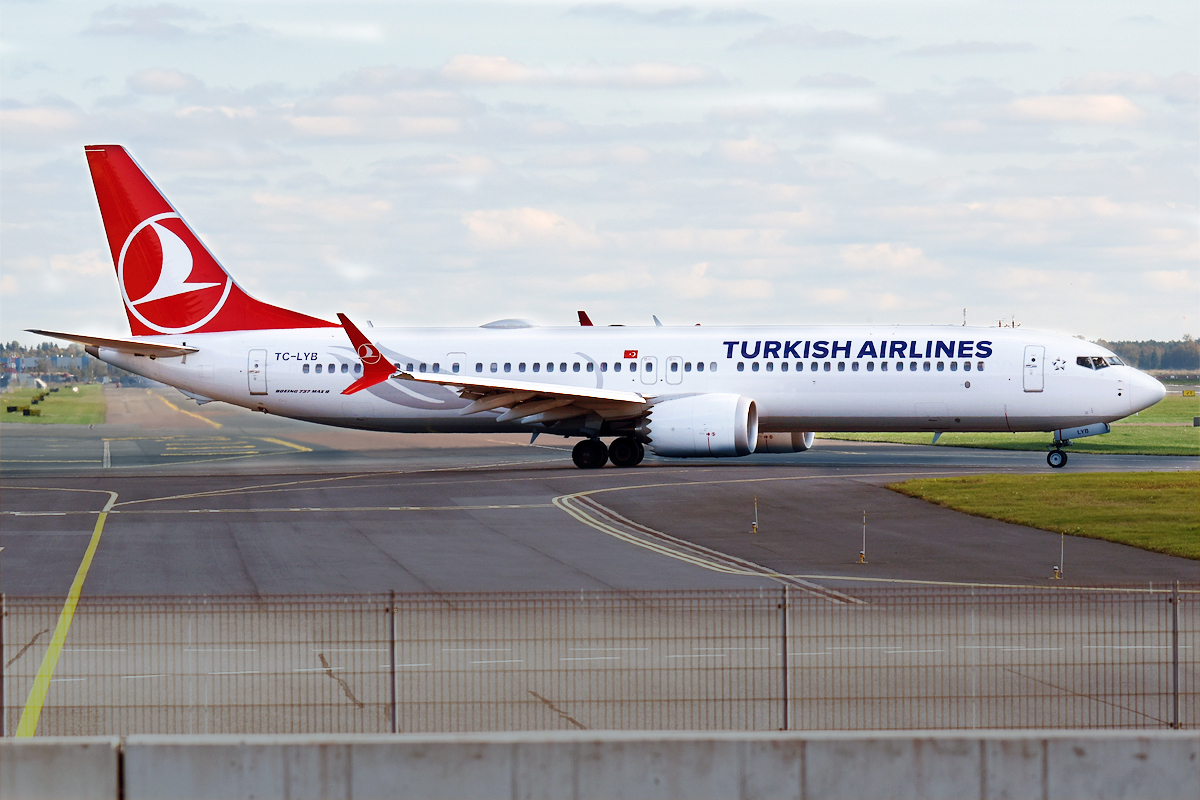
Boeing 737 MAX 9

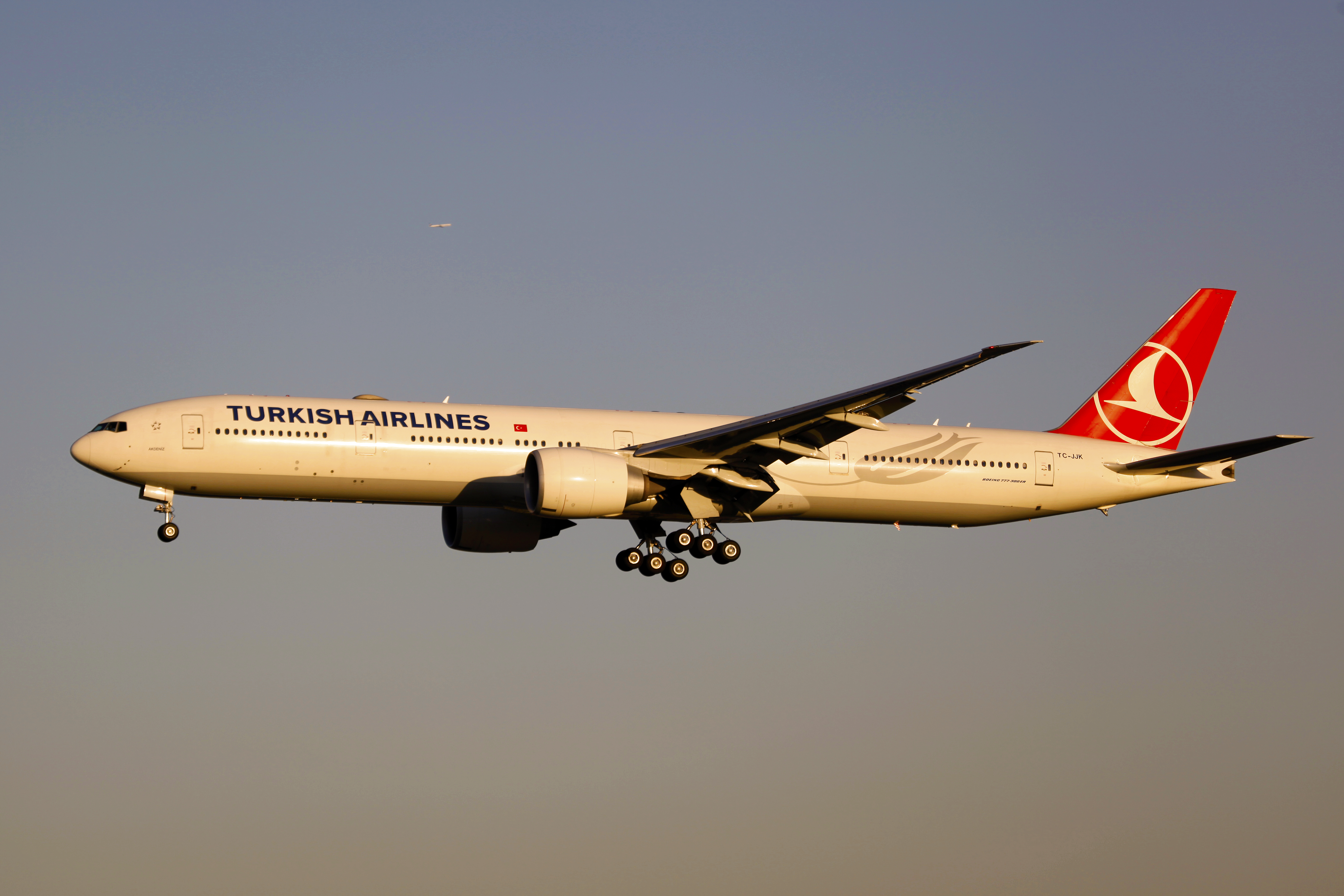
Boeing 777-300ER

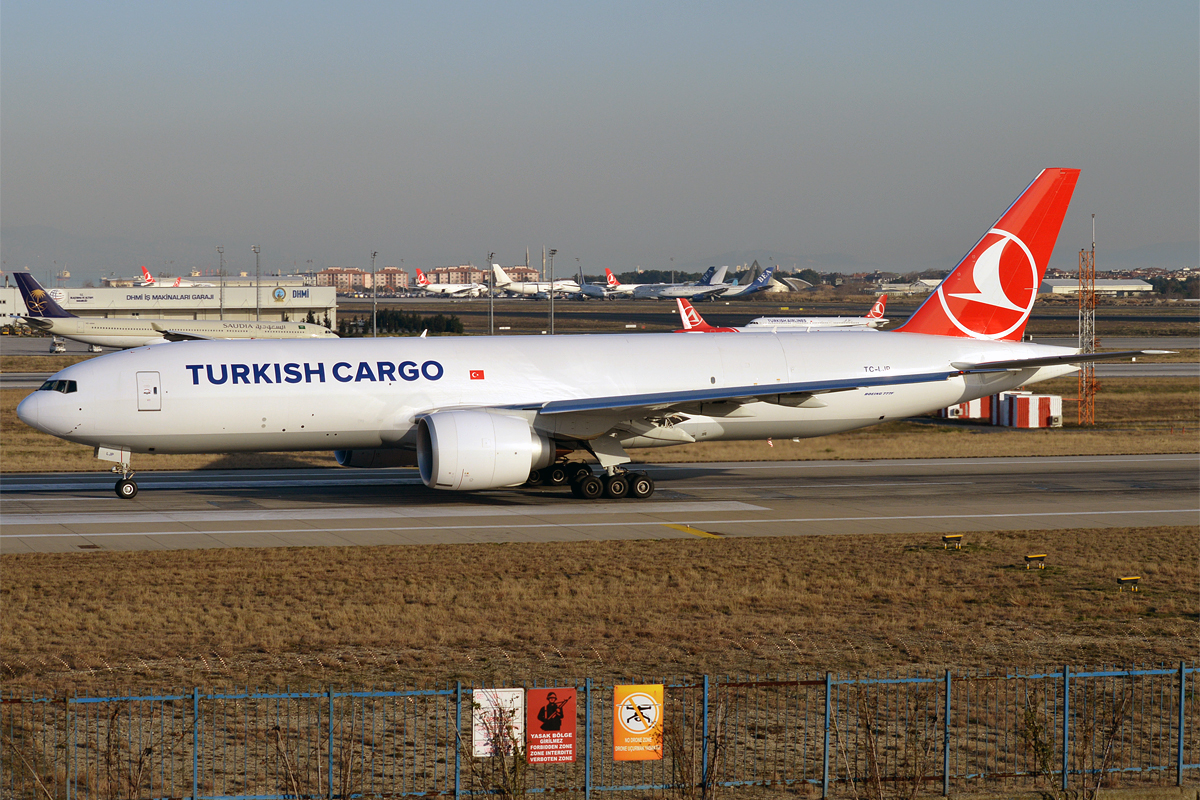
Boeing 777F

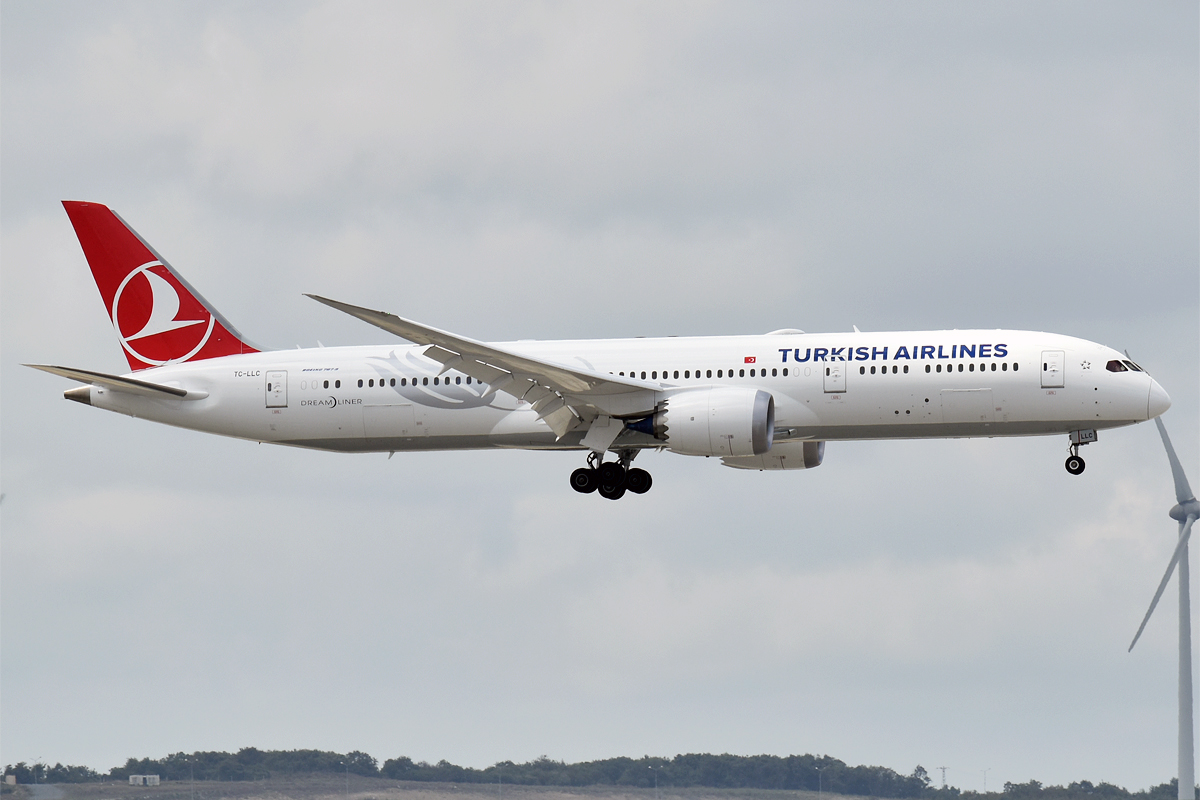
Boeing 787-9 Dreamliner

As of June 2026, Turkish Airlines operates a fleet of 388 aircraft consisting of 13 passenger aircraft types. The number of aircraft in the fleet is no longer evenly split with Airbus and Boeing, since the airline has over sixty percent of its operational aircraft from Airbus and less than forty percent of its operational aircraft from Boeing. Over half of the operational aircraft consists of narrow-bodies. As of 2024, the average age of all aircraft is 9.3 years. Historically, this list included aircraft of AnadoluJet, which did not have its own air operator's certificate (AOC) and used to operate under the AOC of Turkish Airlines until 2024. In March 2024, AnadoluJet completed its rebranding into AJet and started operating separately from Turkish Airlines under its own AOC.

Turkish Airlines fleet
Aircraft	In service	Orders	Passengers			Notes	Refs
Aircraft	In service	Orders	J	Y	Total	Notes	Refs
Airbus A319-100	6	—	—	132	132		
Airbus A320-200	21	—	—	159	159		
Airbus A320-200	21	—	—	180	180		
Airbus A320-200	21	—	—	186	186		
Airbus A321-200	67	—	20	158	178		
Airbus A321-200	67	—	16	164	180		
Airbus A321-200	67	—	—	194	194		
Airbus A321-200	67	—	—	220	220		
Airbus A321neo	58	190	20	162	182	Some orders to be transferred to AJet.	
Airbus A321neo	58	190	16	174	190	Some orders to be transferred to AJet.	
Airbus A330-200	12	—	24	222	246	Leased aircraft are being returned to lessors. To be retired by 2030 and replaced by Airbus A350-900.	
Airbus A330-200	12	—	18	232	250	Leased aircraft are being returned to lessors. To be retired by 2030 and replaced by Airbus A350-900.	
Airbus A330-200	12	—	24	255	279	Leased aircraft are being returned to lessors. To be retired by 2030 and replaced by Airbus A350-900.	
Airbus A330-300	37	—	28	261	289	Leased aircraft are being returned to lessors. To be retired by 2030 and replaced by Airbus A350-900.	
Airbus A330-300	37	—	40	265	305	Leased aircraft are being returned to lessors. To be retired by 2030 and replaced by Airbus A350-900.	
Airbus A330-300	37	—	—	367	367	Leased aircraft are being returned to lessors. To be retired by 2030 and replaced by Airbus A350-900.	
Airbus A350-900	30	60	28	288	316	Six orders taken over from Aeroflot.	
Airbus A350-900	30	60	32	297	329		
Airbus A350-1000	—	15	TBA			To be used for ultra-long-haul flights to Australia, New Zealand, and South America.	
Boeing 737-800	40	—	16	135	151		
Boeing 737-900ER	15	—	16	135	151		
Boeing 737-900ER	15	—	16	153	169		
Boeing 737 MAX 8	20	100	16	135	151	Order with 50 options. Allocation to be determined between Boeing 737 MAX 8 and Boeing 737 MAX 10.	
Boeing 737 MAX 9	5	—	16	153	169		
Boeing 777-300ER	34	—	49	300	349		
Boeing 777-300ER	34	—	28	372	400		
Boeing 777-300ER	34	—	7	524	531		
Boeing 787-9	25	40	30	270	300	Additional order of 35 with 25 options on 25 September 2025. Deliveries from 2029.	
Boeing 787-10	—	15	TBA				
Turkish Airlines Cargo fleet
Airbus A330-200F	10	—	Cargo			Largest operator.	
Airbus A350F	—	5	Cargo			Order with 5 purchase rights on 15 December 2023.	
Boeing 777F	8	4	Cargo				
Total	388	429					

== Historical fleet ==
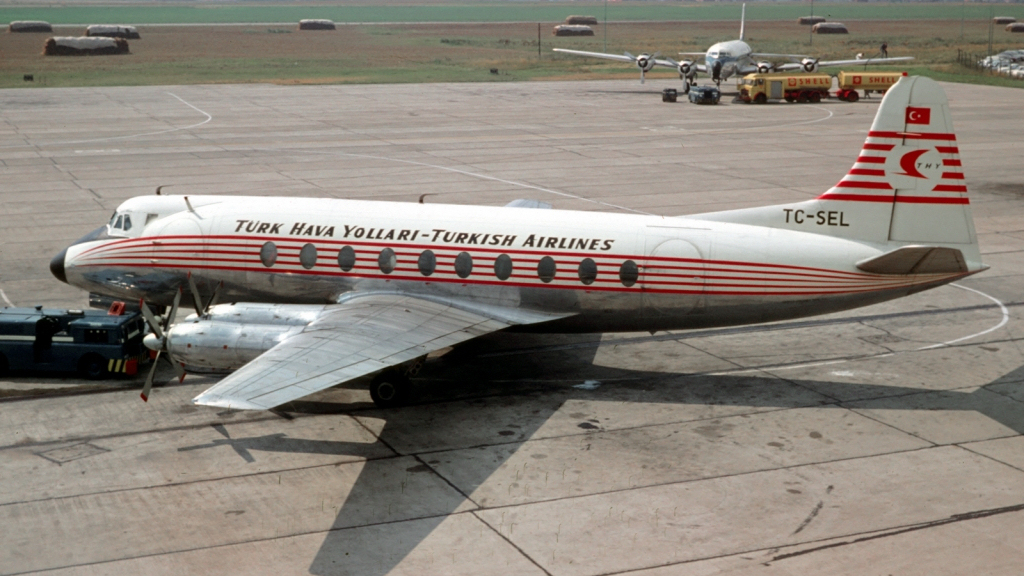
Vickers Viscount

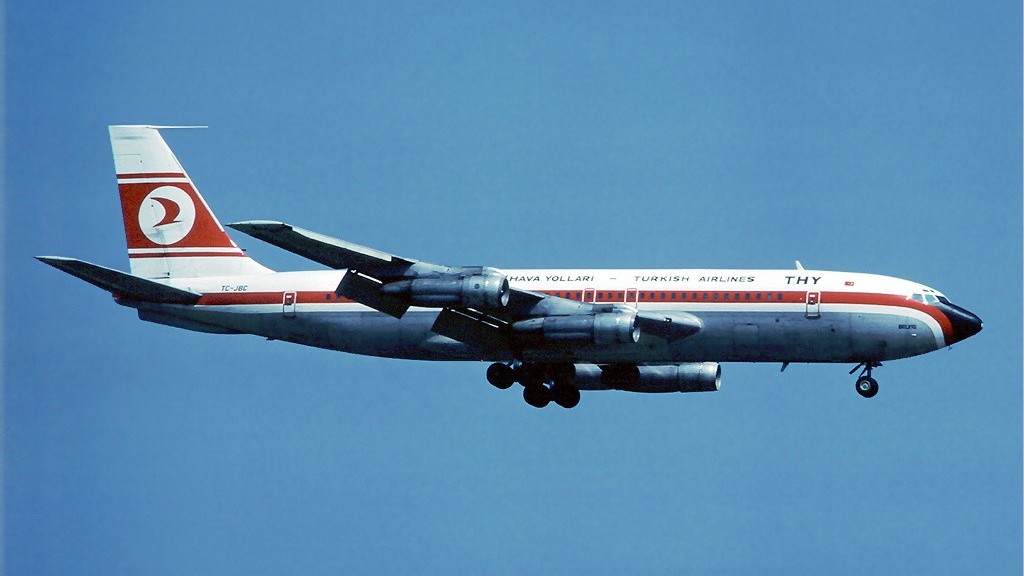
Boeing 707

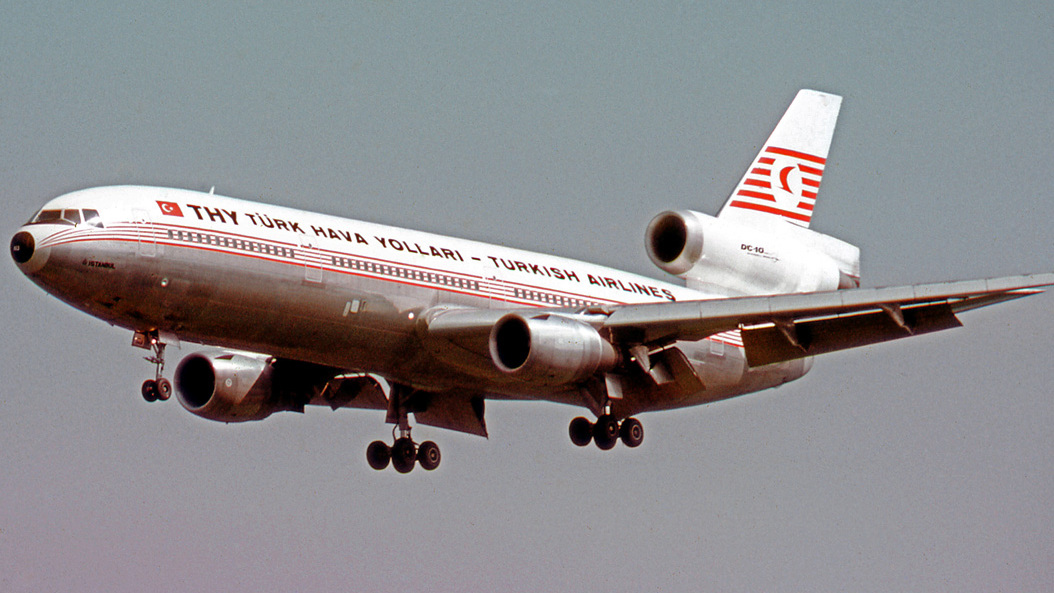
McDonnell Douglas DC-10-10

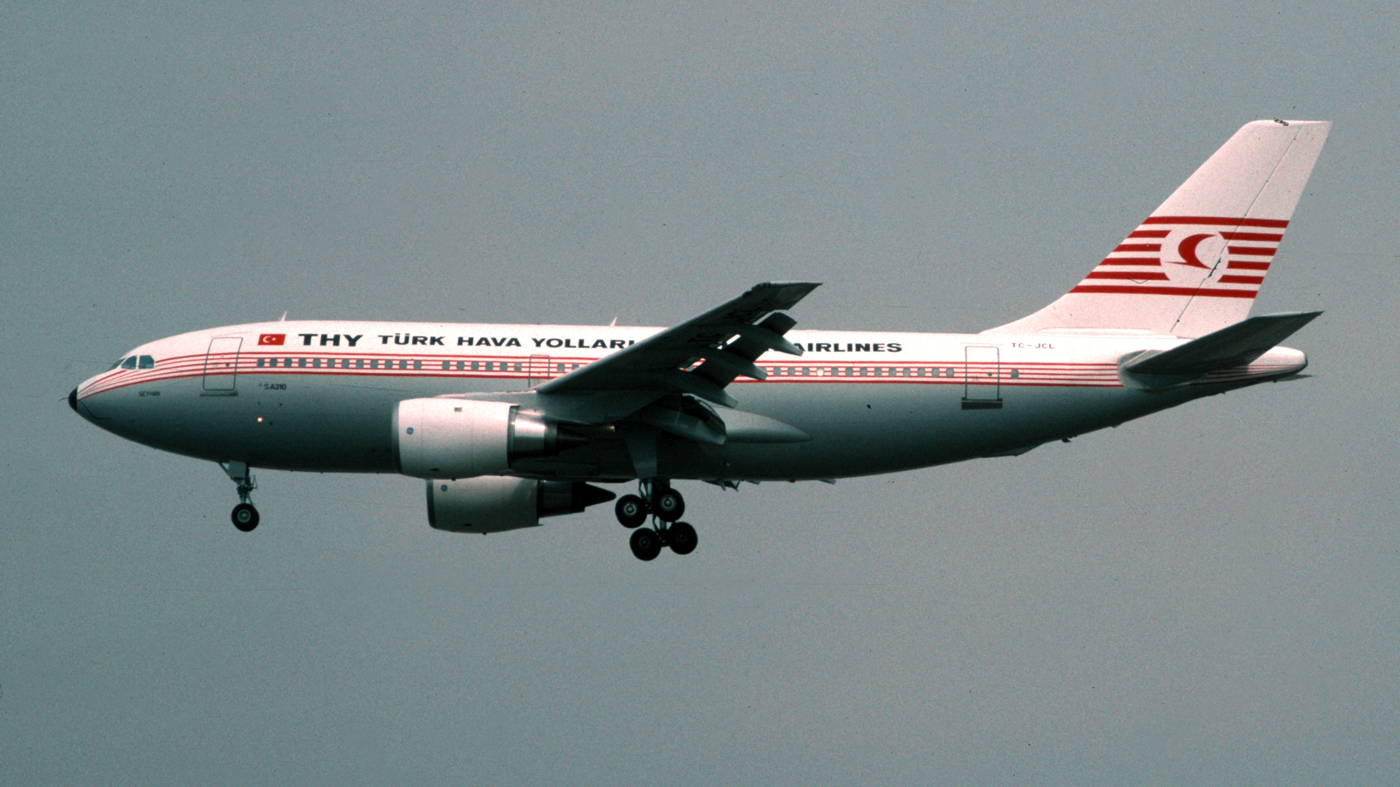
Airbus A310-200

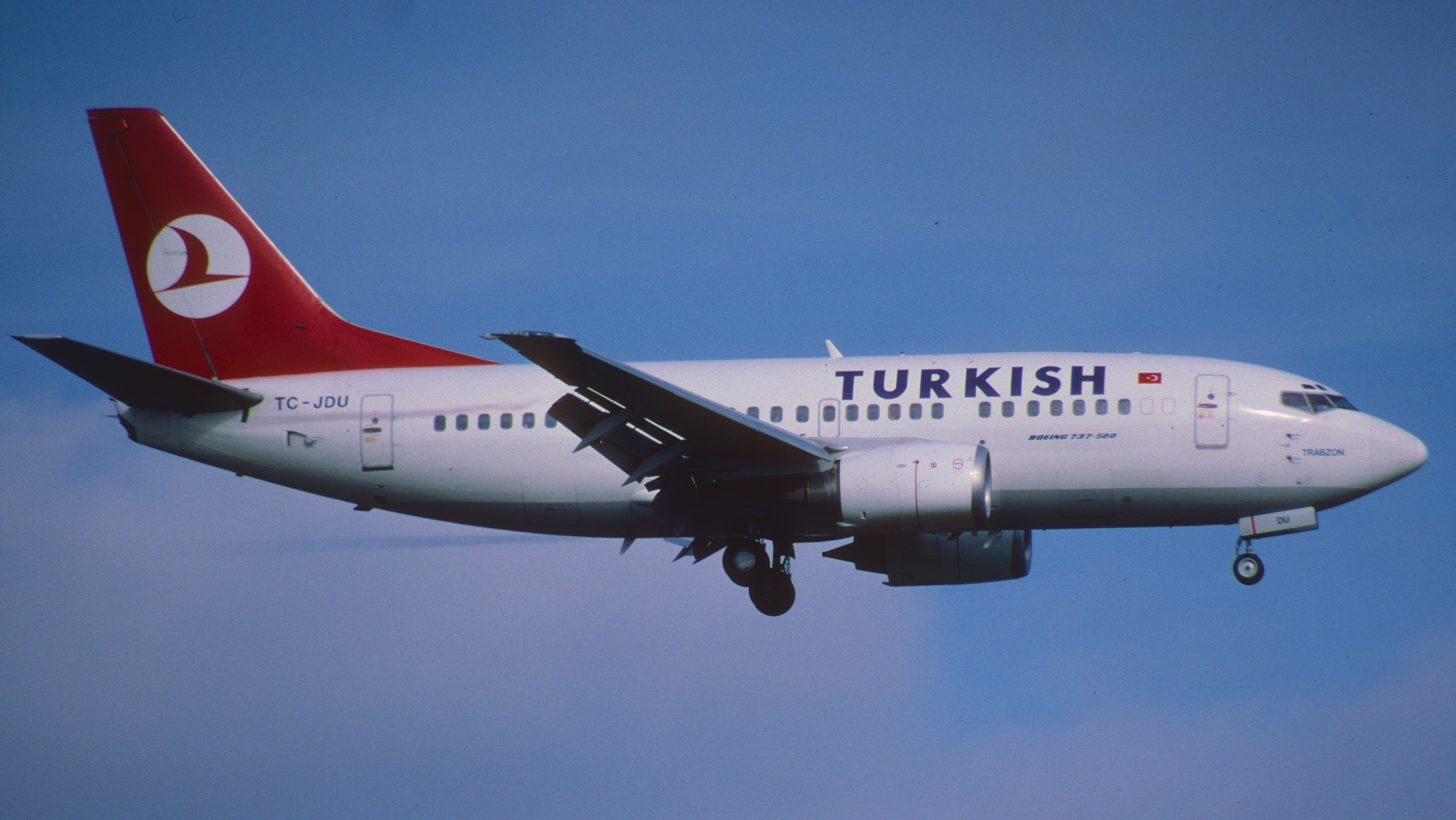
Boeing 737-500

Turkish Airlines former fleet
Aircraft	Quantity (Note: The largest amount of the aircraft operated in a year.)	Introduced	Retired	PAX	Refs
Curtiss Kingbird	2	1933	1935	4	
Junkers F 13	2	1933	1935	5	
Tupolev ANT-9	1	1933	1935	10	
de Havilland Dragon Rapide	4	1936	1946	6	
de Havilland Express	4	1936	1946	10	
de Havilland Dragonfly	1	1937	1946	4	
de Havilland Dominie	6	1943	1946	6	
Junkers Ju 52	5	1944	1946	17	
Douglas DC-3	30	1945	1967	22–24–28	
Douglas C-47	3	1945	1967	Cargo	
de Havilland Heron	7	1955	1959	14	
Vickers Viscount	5	1958	1971	57	
Fokker F27 Friendship	10	1960	1973	40	
Douglas DC-7	2	1967	1969	70	
Douglas DC-9-10	1	1967	1973	111	
Douglas DC-9-30	9	1968	1995	104–111–115	
Boeing 707	8	1971	1990	189	
McDonnell Douglas DC-10-10	3	1972	1989	345	
Fokker F28 Fellowship	5	1972	1987	65	
Boeing 727	9	1974	1996	167	
de Havilland Canada Dash 7	3	1983	1986	50	
Airbus A310-300	8	1985	2015 (Note: Several aircraft were wet-leased from ULS Airlines Cargo later.)	182–210	
Boeing 737-400	16	1991	2013	150	
Boeing 737-500	2	1992	2004	117	
Boeing 737-700	4	2009	2019	124	
Airbus A340-300	9	1993	2019	271 (Note: Regular configuration)–354 (Note: High-density configuration)	
Avro RJ100	10	1993	2006	99	
Avro RJ70	4	1995	2006	79	

== Naming ==
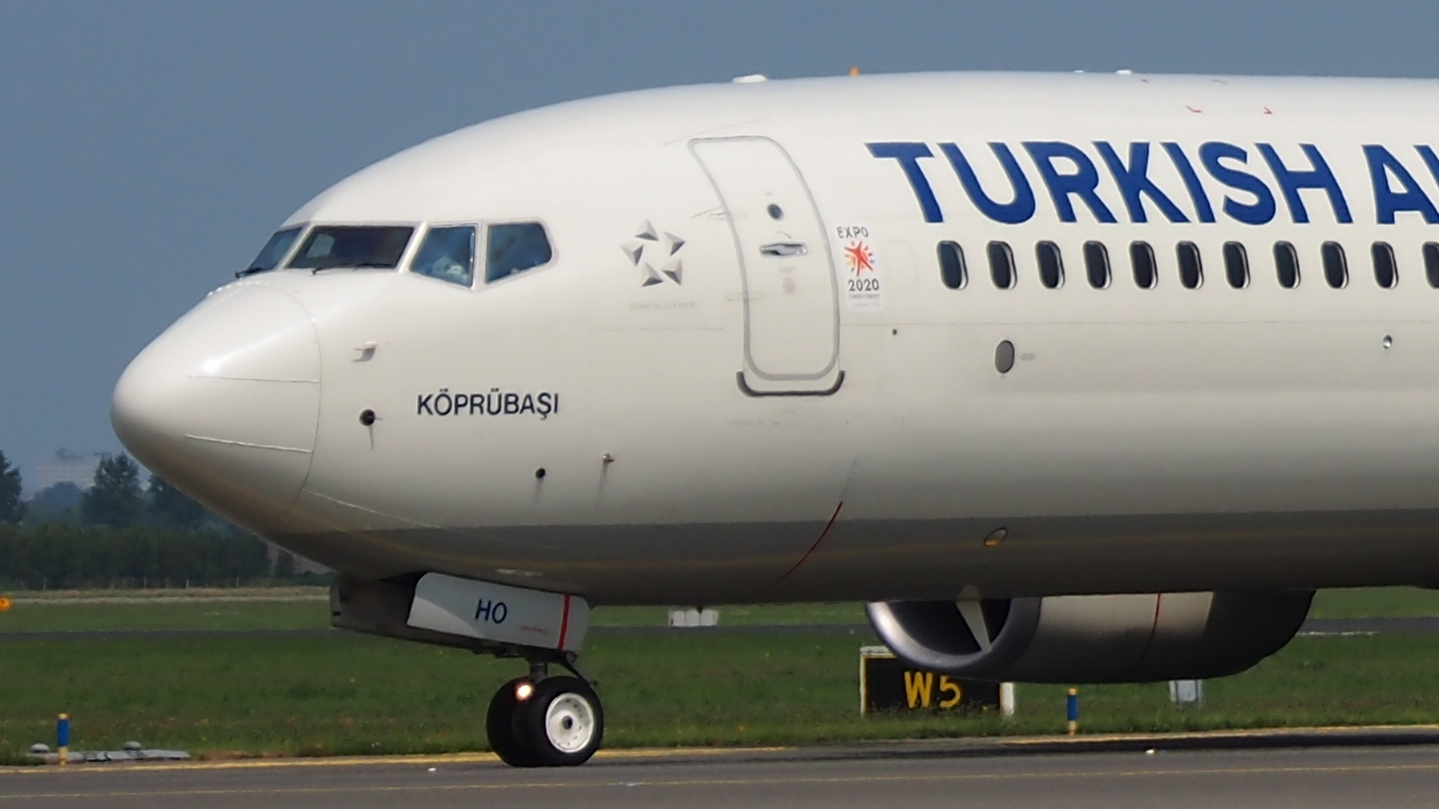
A Boeing 737 of the airline named after Köprübaşı

In 1967, a Douglas DC-7 leased from Sweden arrived in Istanbul with its initial name—Malmö—still on the fuselage. This name was changed to Istanbul while the aircraft was repainted in the livery of Turkish Airlines, becoming the first aircraft of the airline to get a name. Turkish Airlines aircraft are since then given their own name.

Until the 2010s, aircraft operated by Turkish Airlines were named after provinces, rivers and touristic places of Turkey. In 2013, the airline ran out of provinces and further used 39 touristic places as names following discussions with the Ministry of Culture and Tourism. When 25 more aircraft were set to join, it was suggested to use the names of the Turkish districts as well. The names of the aircraft are included below the cockpit windows, with some leased aircraft not having a name despite being painted in the full livery.

Confusion in the naming and registration of Turkish Airlines aircraft arose when the airline leased an Airbus A310 registered as TC-AKP from World Focus Airlines for the summer period of 2004, with AKP being the abbreviation of the Justice and Development Party. Minister of Transport Binali Yıldırım clarified that the registration was given by World Focus Airlines and that the next aircraft Turkish Airlines planned on adding to the fleet were going to be named after Turkish provinces going by their population. He added that registering or naming aircraft after other parties was technically possible.

=== Symbolic names ===
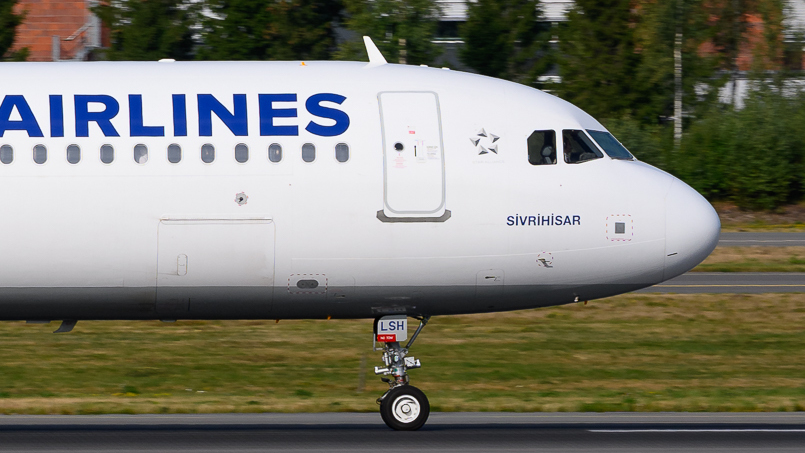
Sivrihisar is one of the symbolic names in the fleet.

An Airbus A330-200 with registration TC-JNC was renamed in November 2015 after the Japanese city of Kushimoto, whose residents helped the survivors of the sinking Ottoman frigate Ertuğrul. In August 2016, Turkish Airlines announced that it would name eight of its aircraft after neighbourhoods of Turkey which were not featured yet, in response to the resistance of the citizens of those neighbourhoods in the 2016 Turkish coup d'état attempt. (Note: The eight neighbourhoods are: Beştepe, Saraçhane, Çengelköy, Kavacık, Kazan, Acıbadem, Atışalanı and Gölbaşı.) The airline started an online survey to name its first Boeing 787 on 26 June 2019, with the options being Perga, Assos, Göbeklitepe and Zeugma. Following widespread reactions on social media requesting the plane to be named after Eren Bülbül, the aircraft was named Maçka, his hometown, instead of the initial four options given.

In September 2019, an Airbus A321neo registered as TC-LSH was named Sivrihisar, a reference to the Sivrihisar Airplane, which was bought by the citizens of the town and gifted to the Turkish Air Force during the Turkish War of Independence. Following the 2023 Turkey–Syria earthquakes, the 400th aircraft of the airline was named Tek Yürek, which comes from the Türkiye Tek Yürek campaign to raise money following the disaster. The Airbus A350-900 made its first passenger flight in March 2023 by carrying 275 survivors of the earthquake. In July 2025, an Airbus A350-900 was named Osmancık, the hometown of Şenay Aybüke Yalçın. Yalçın was an elementary school teacher killed 8 years prior in a terrorist attack by the Kurdistan Workers' Party. The 500th aircraft of the airline, also an Airbus A350-900, received the name TK Aile (lit. 'TK Family') in February 2026.

== Livery ==
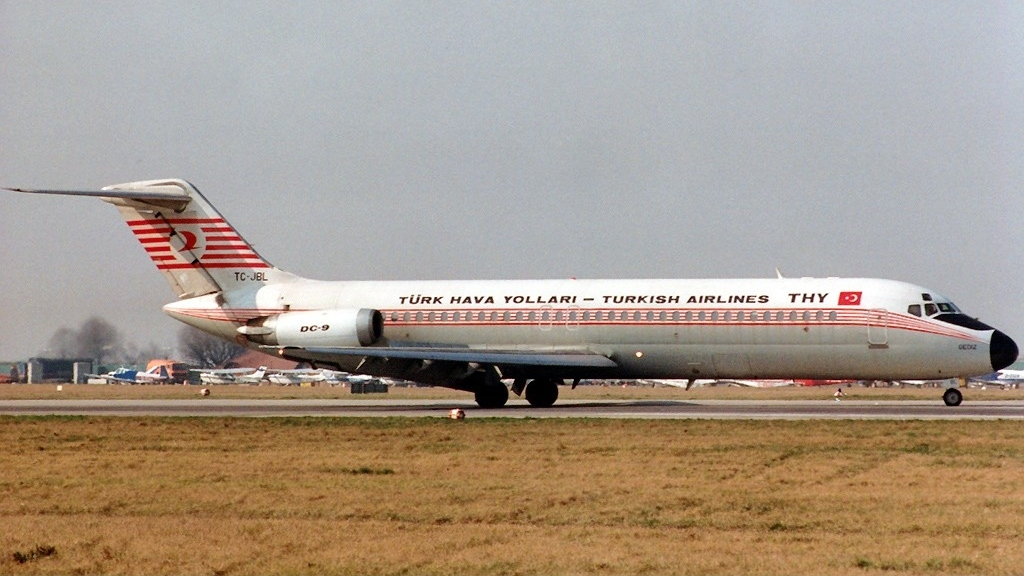
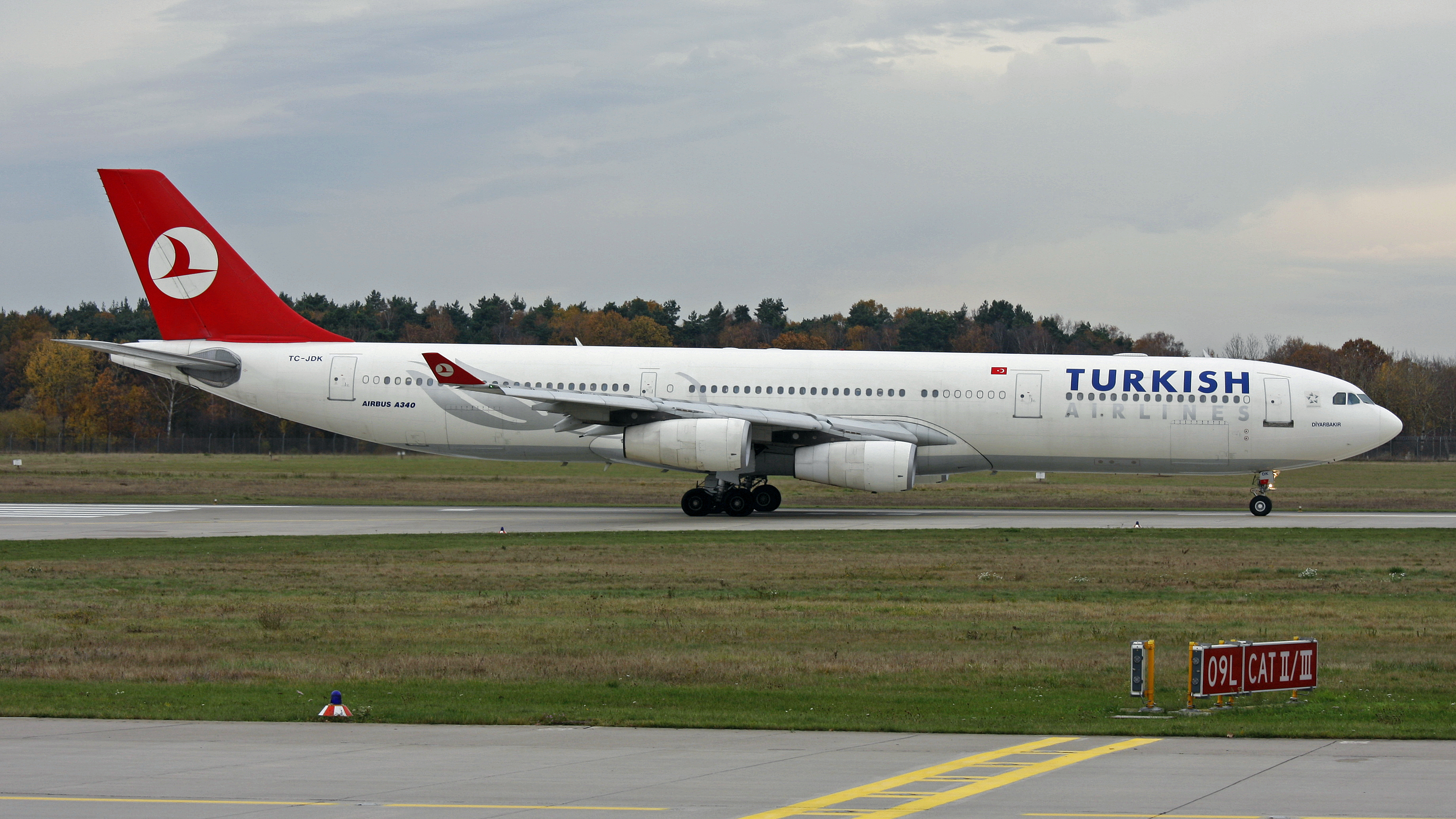
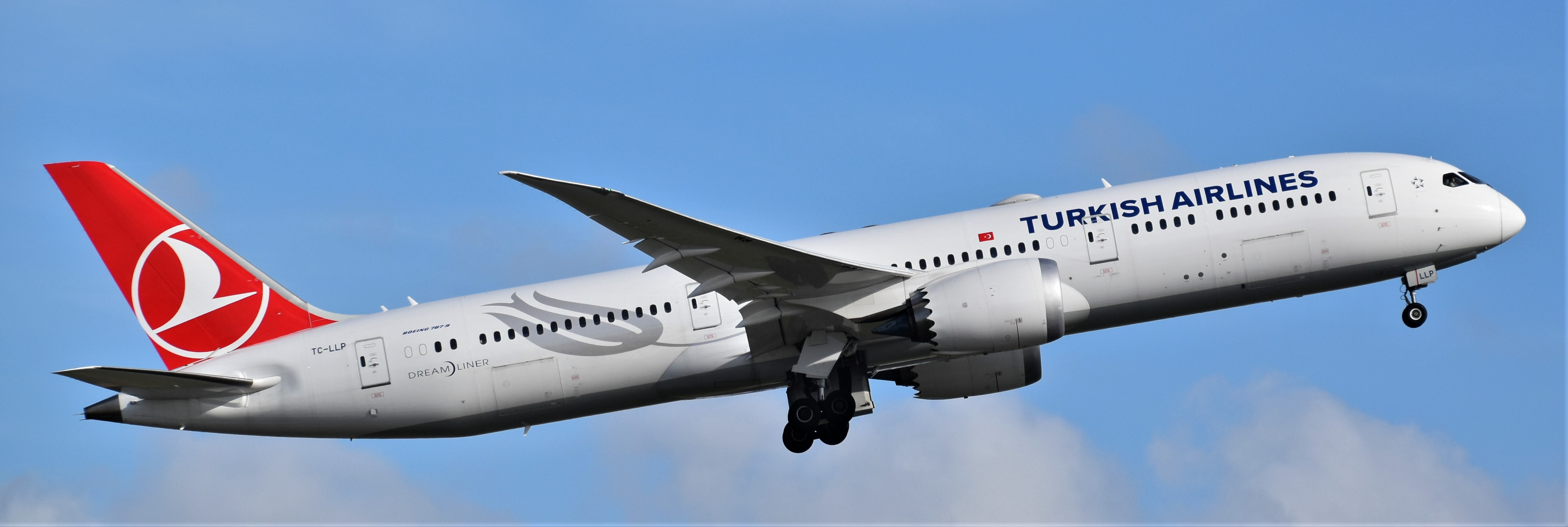
The "pyjama" livery on a McDonnell Douglas DC-9 (top), the livery used from 2005 to 2010 on an Airbus A340 (middle) and the current livery on a Boeing 787 (bottom).

During the first 25 years of operation, the aircraft only had a few red stripes on metal colours on the fuselage. The name of the airline was first written on the noses of de Havilland Dragon Rapides. From 1958 onwards, with the arrival of new Vickers Viscount turboprop aircraft, the airline applied a "pyjama"-styled livery with five red stripes. As the airline had no logo at the time, the tail only consisted of a Turkish flag.

In 1959, the airline's CEO Ulvi Yenal decided to hold a competition to select the new logo of Turkish Airlines. The design of Mesut Manioğlu won the competition and was included on the aircraft in 1961, and has remained on the livery ever since, with a minor alteration in 1986 to simplify the logo. The greylag goose was chosen because it is one of the few animals that can fly at a high altitude over long distances. If tilted in three specific angles, the logo resembles the letters "T", "H" and "Y", which are the initials of "Türk Hava Yolları", the name of the airline in Turkish.

After the introduction of the goose logo, the "pyjama" livery was altered slightly to include the new logo: a white tail with a white circle including the red emblem. The bellies of the planes had an aluminium finish while the nose was black. The text on the plane read "THY Türk Hava Yolları-Turkish Airlines" on the left side; on the right, the concept was the same with different text reading "Türk Hava Yolları-Turkish Airlines THY". The Boeing 707 aircraft introduced in 1971 however, had a slightly different livery for a short period. The four thin stripes were turned into one thick stripe, with the rest of the livery staying largely the same.

In the early 1990s, a new livery was introduced that had a white fuselage with a blue "Turkish Airlines" or "Turkish" at the front and a red "THY" near the rear, and a red tail with the company logo in a white circle in the center. In mid 2005, the livery was updated on some widebody aircraft to include a grey "Airlines" text under the blue "Turkish" and a tulip in the same colour was added for the first time on the fuselage running from the rear of the wing to the tail, the latter of which according to CEO Temel Kotil is an important symbol for the airline, with the aim of giving aircraft and employees a "more contemporary image". Designed by Cemil İpekçi, the first aircraft to feature the tulip design was delivered to Turkish Airlines on 25 September 2005. However, on narrowbody aircraft, the tulip symbol and text "Airlines" did not included.

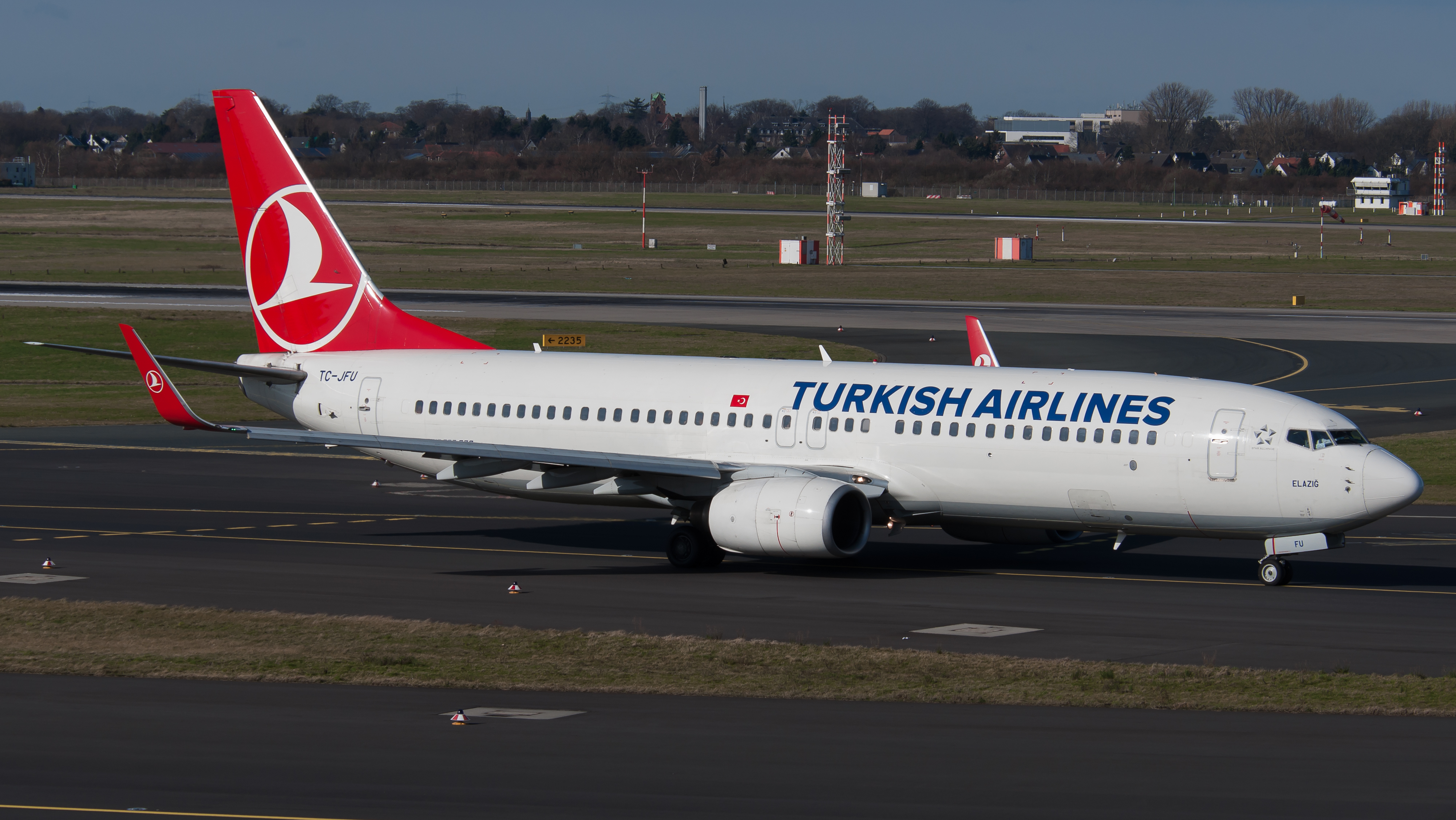
TC-JFU, the first aircraft to be painted in the new livery

On 4 July 2010, Turkish Airlines revealed its new livery painted on a Boeing 737-800 named Elazığ for the first time. Designed by Bülent Erkmen, the airline's new "Eurowhite" livery features a white fuselage with blue lettering, and a red tail with the company logo in a white circle-outline. The winglet also got the same design as the tail. The grey "Airlines" lettering was moved up next to the "Turkish" text, and the grey belly of the fuselage was kept without a change. The grey tulip on the fuselage was initially removed, but newer aircraft are now again delivered with a tulip. The paint of the aircraft stays for a minimum of five years before being re-painted.

=== Special liveries ===
Turkish Airlines operates the following aircraft with a special livery:

Special liveries
Registration	Aircraft	Name	Description	Photo	Refs
TC-JNB	Airbus A330-203	Konya	Turkish Olympic team livery		
TC-JNC	Airbus A330-203	Kushimoto	Retro livery		
TC-JOD	Airbus A330-303	Malazgirt	Nexus of the World		
TC-JRF	Airbus A321-231	Fethiye	100th Anniversary of the Republic of Turkey		
TC-JVZ	Boeing 737-8F2	Beştepe	6000th Boeing 737 Next Generation aircraft sticker		
TC-LGH	Airbus A350-941	Tek Yürek	400th aircraft of Turkish Airlines		
TC-LHH	Airbus A350-941	TK Aile	500th aircraft of Turkish Airlines		
TC-LJH	Boeing 777-3F2	—	Biofuel livery		
TC-LNF	Airbus A330-303	Kocaeli	Turkish Airlines Holidays		
