= Bilal Ekşi =

Turkish airlines executive (born 1968)

- Born: 1968 (age 57–58)
- Occupations: Deputy chairman and CEO untli 2026 Turkish Airlines

Bilal Ekşi (born 1968 in Rize, Turkey) is ex-deputy chairman and CEO of Turkish Airlines.

== Biography ==
Ekşi graduated from Yıldız Technical University, the Department of Electronics and Communications Engineering in 1989. After graduation he joined as an Electronics and Communications Engineer the Turkish State Railways, later being assigned to the position of Workshop Manager at Metro Istanbul.

== Work ==
Bilal Ekşi joined Turkish Airlines in 2003. Between 2003 and 2005 he worked as Head of Overhaul Workshops. In 2005, Ekşi became the company's Chief Ground Operations Officer. Between 2008 and 2009 Ekşi served as the Chief Production Officer at Turkish Technic, the maintenance, repair, and overhaul center of Turkish Airlines. From 2009 to 2010 Ekşi worked as Executive Vice President at Turkish Engine Center (TEC), a Joint Venture of Turkish Technic and Pratt & Whitney. In 2010 he became General Manager of the company's sister air carrier Cyprus Turkish Airlines.

Ekşi left Turkish Airlines in April 2011, becoming Head of the Directorate General of the Turkish Civil Aviation.

On October 21, 2016, Ekşi was assigned as Chief Executive Officer and Deputy Chairman of the Board and Executive Committee of Turkish Airlines, succeeding Temel Kotil.
