= Talay UAV =

Turkish unmanned aerial vehicle

Talay UAV (Turkish: Talay İHA) is a Turkish electrically-powered high-speed unmanned aerial vehicle (UAV) designed and manufactured by Solid Aero. It is intended for low-altitude maritime operations and coastal strike missions. Its operation close to sea surface ensures low observability. It is of compact structure, with foldable wings. Its payload is up to 30kg, speed up to 200km/h. Operation time is up to 3 h if taking an advantage of the ground effect, otherwise 1h.

It can operate at altitudes down to 30cm, with cruising altitudes in the range of 3–150m. It can take off and land on water. Selçuk Fırat, founder of Solid Aero, said that "It's one of the few UAVs capable of executing low-altitude kamikaze attacks, much like sea skimming missiles". In addition to striking capabilities, it may be used for reconnaissance and surveillance.

Domestically, it was first presented at the Saha Expo in 2024. Internationally, it was first introduced at the 17th International Defence Industry Fair, Istanbul, 2025. Mass production is planned for October 2026, with prototypes delivered to Turkish Navy by January 2027. Hull assembly and final inspection are scheduled with Yonca Shipyard.
