= Temel Kotil =

Turkish executive officer

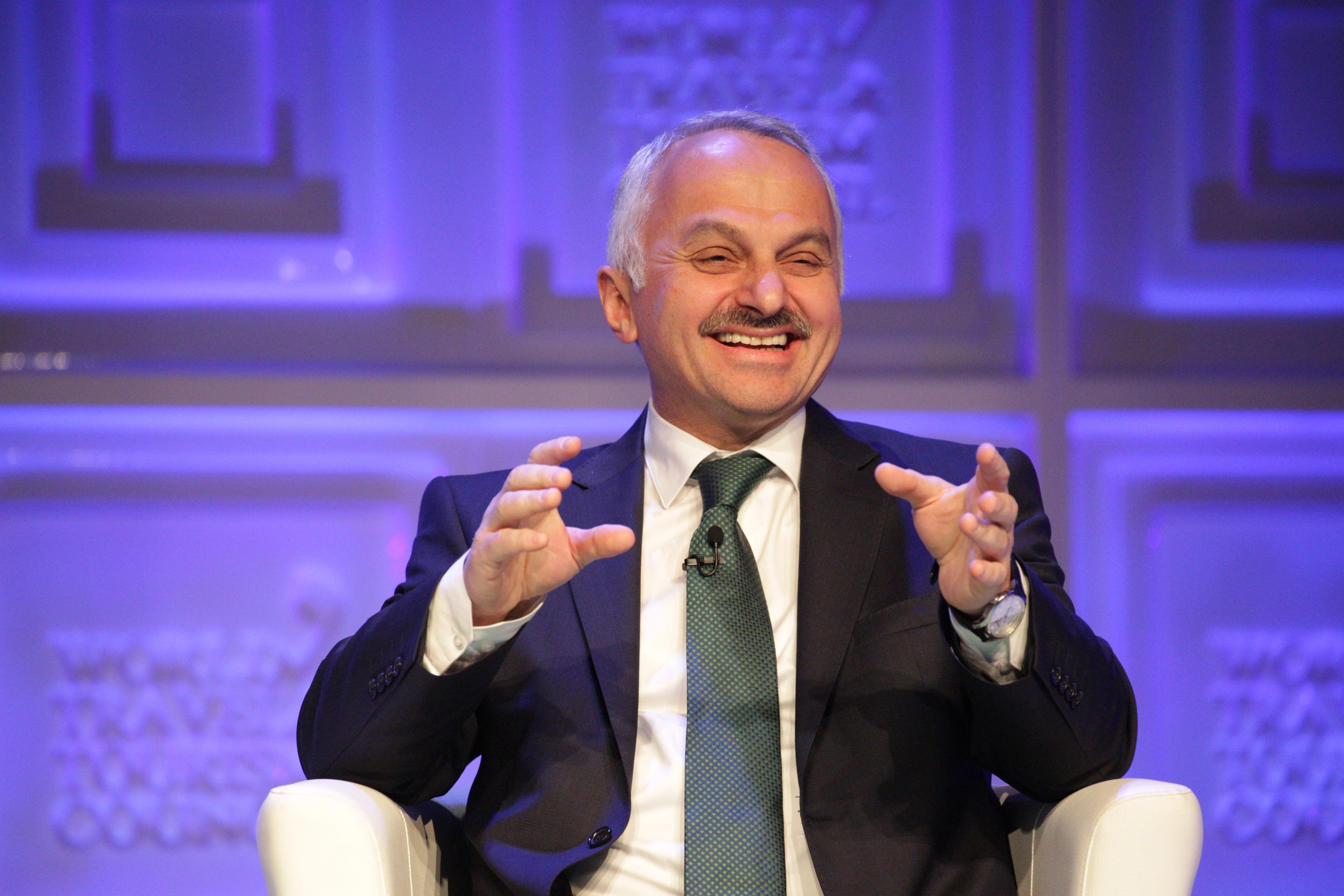
- Temel Kotil at WTTC Global Summit 2015
- Born: 3 December 1959 (age 66); Rize, Turkey
- Education: Istanbul Technical University (BS); University of Michigan (M.Sc); University of Michigan (PhD)
- Occupation: Business executive
- Years active: 2003–present
- Title: Chairman, CEO of Turkish Aerospace Industries (2016–2024)
- Predecessor: Muharrem Dörtkaşlı
- Children: 4
- Website: TUSAŞ - Temel Kotil

Temel Kotil (born 1959) is an aeronautical engineer and was the CEO of Turkish Aerospace Industries from 2016 to 2024. Previously, he was the CEO of Turkish Airlines from April 2005 to October 2016.

He graduated in aeronautical engineering from Istanbul Technical University with a B.Sc. degree in 1983. Awarded a scholarship by the Turkish Ministry of Industry in 1984, he was educated at the University of Michigan-Ann Arbor (USA), where he obtained an M.Sc. degree in aerospace engineering in 1986 and another M.Sc. in mechanical engineering in 1987 from the same university. Kotil continued his studies there and received his Ph.D. in mechanical engineering in 1991.

After returning home in 1991, he was appointed an associate chair in the Department of Aeronautical Engineering at Istanbul Technical University. He founded and managed the laboratories of aircraft design, structural mechanics and advance computational mechanics. At the same time, Kotil was charged with duties of the manager of the department's computer center. From 1994 until 1997, he was the manager of a technical department at Istanbul Metropolitan Municipality. Between 2002 and 2003, he worked as the head of the Research, Planning and Coordination Department at Advance Innovative Technologies Inc. in New York. In 2003, he returned to Turkey and was employed by Turkish Airlines in Istanbul becoming its executive vice president in charge of technical affairs. In April 2005, Kotil was appointed to assume the position of general manager and CEO of the biggest airline company of Turkey. Kotil retired as CEO of Turkish Airlines in October 2016, being succeeded by Bilal Ekşi.

Kotil is a member of the Turkish Mechanical Engineering Society since 1991 and has been a member of the Board of Governors at the International Air Transport Association since 2006. In 2010 he was elected as a Board of Governors of Association of European Airlines (AEA) and became the vice president between 2012 and 2013. On 1 January 2014, Kotil became president of the AEA.

== Awards ==
- 2014 Airline Strategy Awards - Executive Leadership Award
