= Turkish Airlines =

National airline of Turkey

Turkish Airlines Türk Hava Yolları Anonim Ortaklığı

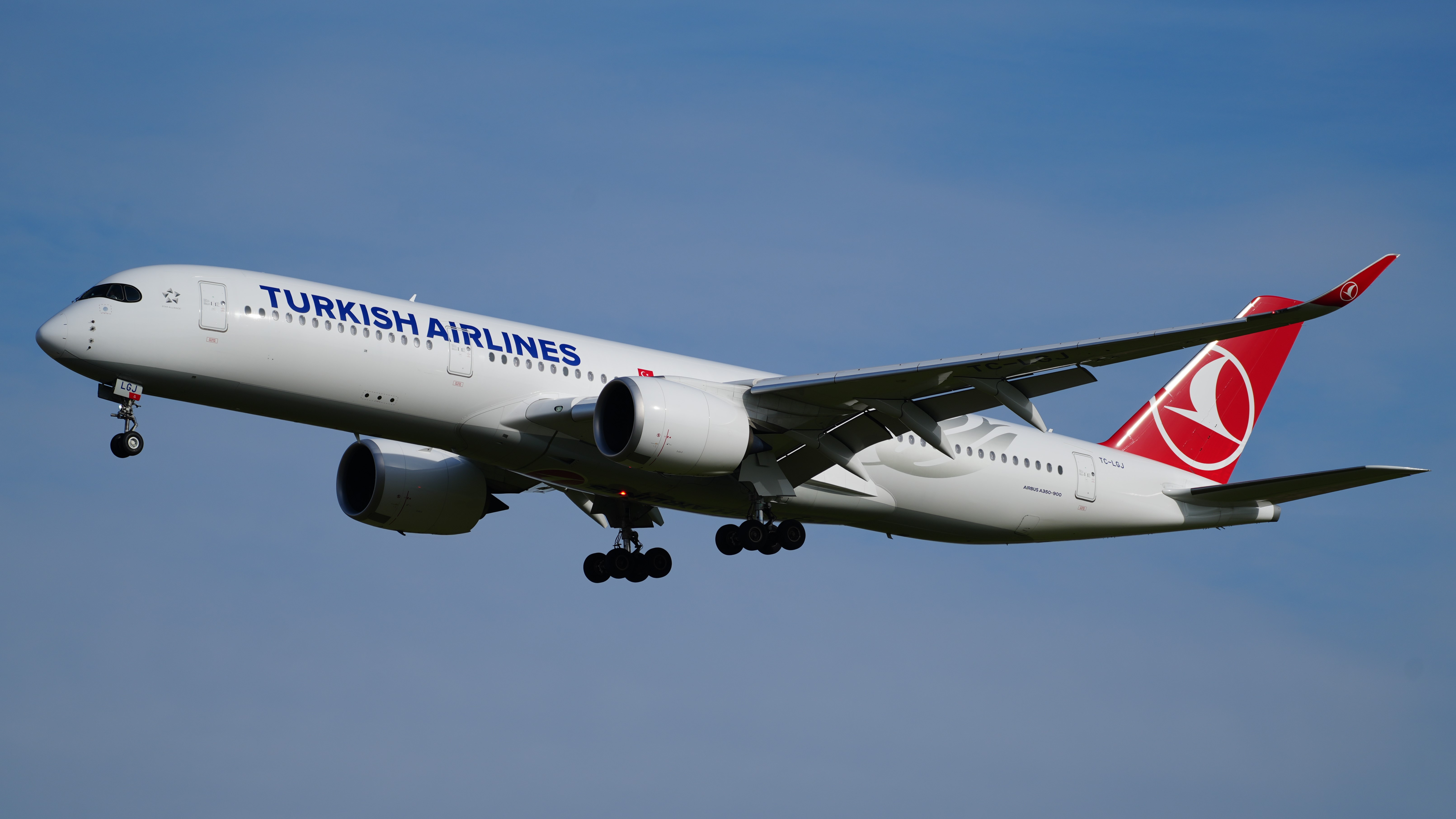
- An Airbus A350-900 of Turkish Airlines
IATA	ICAO	Call sign
TK	THY	TURKISH
- Founded: 20 May 1933; 93 years ago
- AOC #: TQKF144F
- Hubs: Istanbul Airport
- Frequent-flyer program: Miles&Smiles
- Alliance: Star Alliance
- Subsidiaries: AJet; SunExpress (50%); Turkish Cargo; Turkish Technic; Turkish DO & CO (50%); Turkish Ground Services; Turkish Airlines Flight Academy; THY Destek Hizmetleri A.Ş. (100%); THY OPET (50%); Turkish Engine Center (49%); TCI Cabin Interior (30%); TSI Aviation Seats (45%); Turkish Nacelle Center (40%); Tax Free Zone, Inc. (30%); We World Express (45%)
- Fleet size: 569
- Destinations: 358
- Traded as: BİST: THYAO
- Headquarters: Atatürk Airport, Yeşilköy, Istanbul, Turkey
- Key people: Murat Şeker (chairman of the board); Bilal Ekşi (deputy chairman & CEO)
- Revenue: ▲US$ 22.669 billion (2024)
- Operating income: ▲US$ 4.182 billion (2024)
- Net income: ▲US$ 3.647 billion (2024)
- Total assets: ▲US$ 39.674 billion (2024)
- Total equity: ▲US$ 19.314 billion (2024)
- Employees: 40,264 (2024)
- Website: www.turkishairlines.com

Turkish Airlines (Turkish: Türk Hava Yolları), or legally Türk Hava Yolları Anonim Ortaklığı, is the flag carrier of Turkey. As of September 2026, it operates scheduled services to 358 destinations (including cargo) in global. The airline serves more destinations non-stop from a single airport than any other airline in the world and flies to 131 countries, more than any other airline. With an operational fleet of 24 cargo aircraft, the airline's cargo division Turkish Cargo serves 82 destinations. The airline also owns a low-cost subsidiary, AJet.

The airline's corporate headquarters are on the grounds of Atatürk Airport in Yeşilköy, Bakırköy, Istanbul. The airline's main base is Istanbul Airport in Arnavutköy. It has been a member of the Star Alliance network since 1 April 2008.

== History ==
=== Early years ===
Turkish Airlines was established on 20 May 1933 as Turkish State Airlines (Turkish: Devlet Hava Yolları) as a department of the Ministry of National Defense. The airline's initial fleet consisted of two five-seat Curtiss Kingbirds, two four-seat Junkers F 13s and one ten-seat Tupolev ANT-9. In 1935, the airline was turned over to the Ministry of Public Works and was subsequently renamed General Directorate of State Airlines. Three years later, in 1938, it became part of the Ministry of Transportation.

=== Postwar period ===
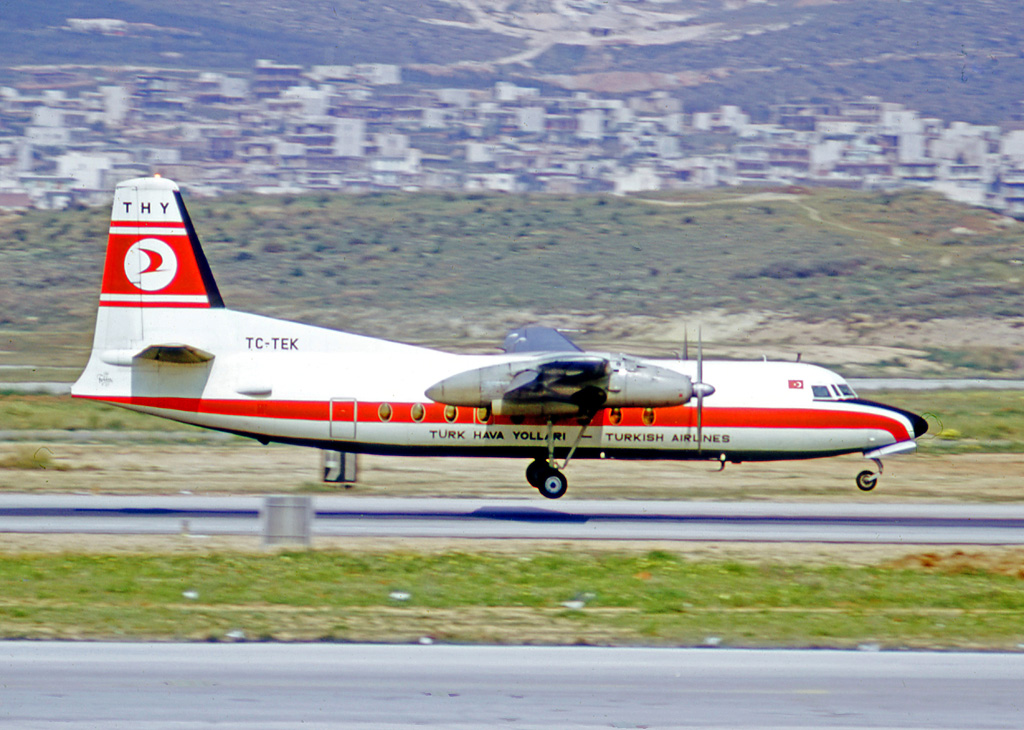
THY Fokker F27 Friendship landing at Athens Hellenikon Airport in 1973

Several Douglas DC-3s and Douglas C-47s were phased in during 1945. Being initially set up as a domestic carrier, the airline commenced international services with the inauguration of Ankara–Istanbul–Athens flights in 1947; with the DC-3s and C-47s enabling the carrier to expand its network.

Nicosia, Beirut and Cairo were soon added to the airline's international flight destinations. However, domestic services remained the carrier's primary focus until the early 1960s.

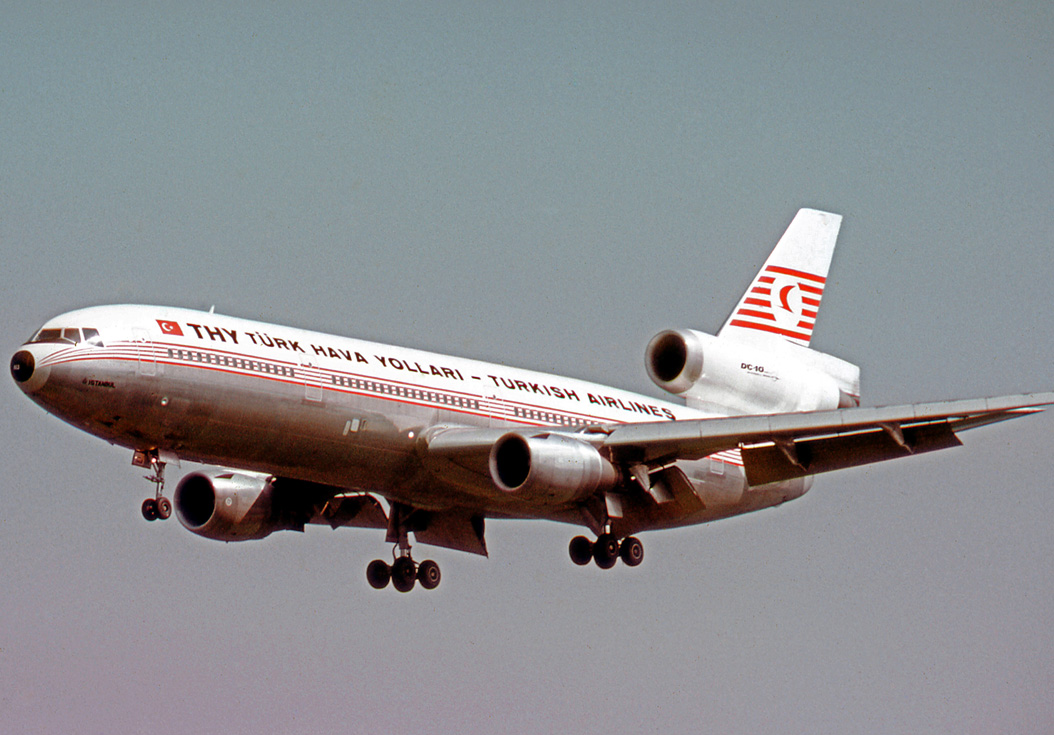
THY Douglas DC-10 in 1974

In 1956, the Turkish government reorganized the airline under the name Türk Hava Yolları A.O. (often abbreviated as THY). It was capitalized at TRY 60 million. The airline joined the International Air Transport Association (IATA) shortly thereafter. In 1957, British Overseas Airways Corporation (BOAC) began supplying technical support after acquiring a 6.5 percent shareholding, which it held for about 20 years.

New aircraft, including Vickers Viscounts, Fokker F27s and Douglas DC-3s, were added to the fleet in the late 1950s and early 1960s. Turkish Airlines began operating its first jet, a McDonnell Douglas DC-9, in 1967. This was followed by the addition of three Boeing 707 jets in 1971. Other aircraft operated in the early 1970s included the McDonnell Douglas DC-10 and the Fokker F28, which were put into service in 1972 and 1973, respectively.

=== 1980s and 1990s ===
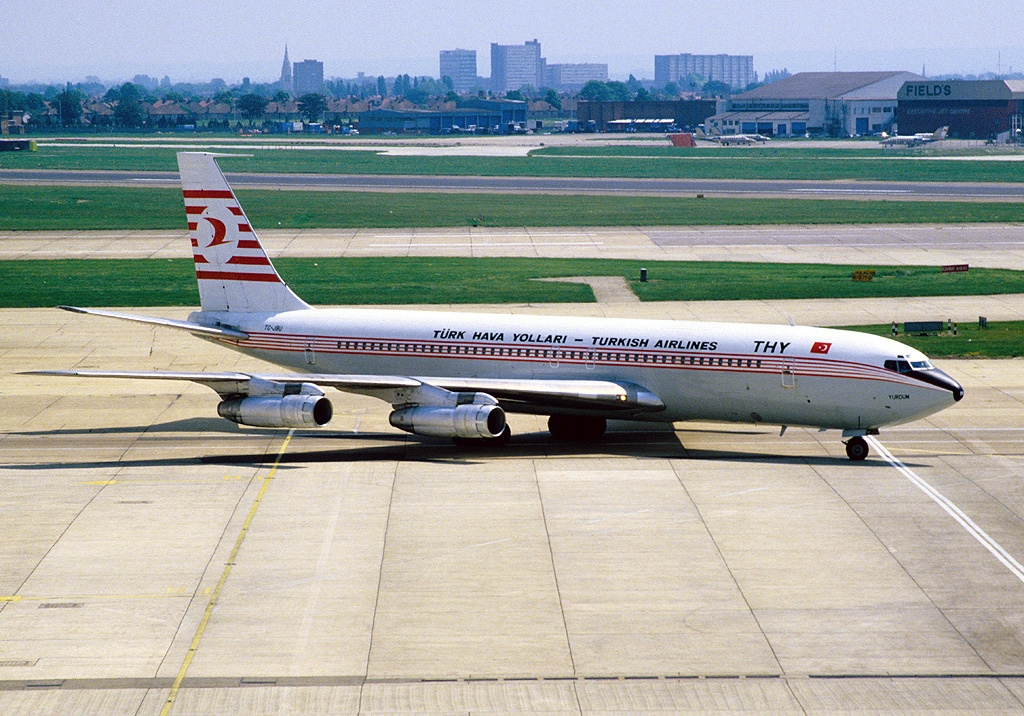
A Boeing 707 operated by Turkish Airlines at Heathrow Airport in 1984

The airline was plagued by several issues in the 1980s and 90s. It developed a reputation for poor service compared to competitors and flight delays, with 47 out of 100 flights not departing on time. It also endured hijackings and suffered seven accidents between 1974 and 1983. The most notorious was the 1974 crash of Turkish Airlines Flight 981, when an aircraft design flaw led to a faulty cargo door breaking off in flight near Ermenonville, France, resulting in the deaths of 346 people. At the time of the accident, THY981 was the worst plane crash of all time.

A new government came to power in 1983 which recognized THY's importance as Turkey's gateway to the world, beginning the airline's makeover into a modern operation. It would go on to maintain one of the youngest fleets in the world. Security was intensified, causing one shipper to compare it to Israel's El Al, at least in terms of delays.

THY built a new, state-of-the-art technical center at Yeşilköy Airport in 1984. The airline was capable of both light and heavy maintenance on many different aircraft types. The technical staff then made up one-quarter of the airline's 6,000 employees, according to Air Transport World. In 1984, the company's capital was raised to 60 billion TL as it was classified as a state economic enterprise. Three years later, the capital was raised again, to 150 billion TL.

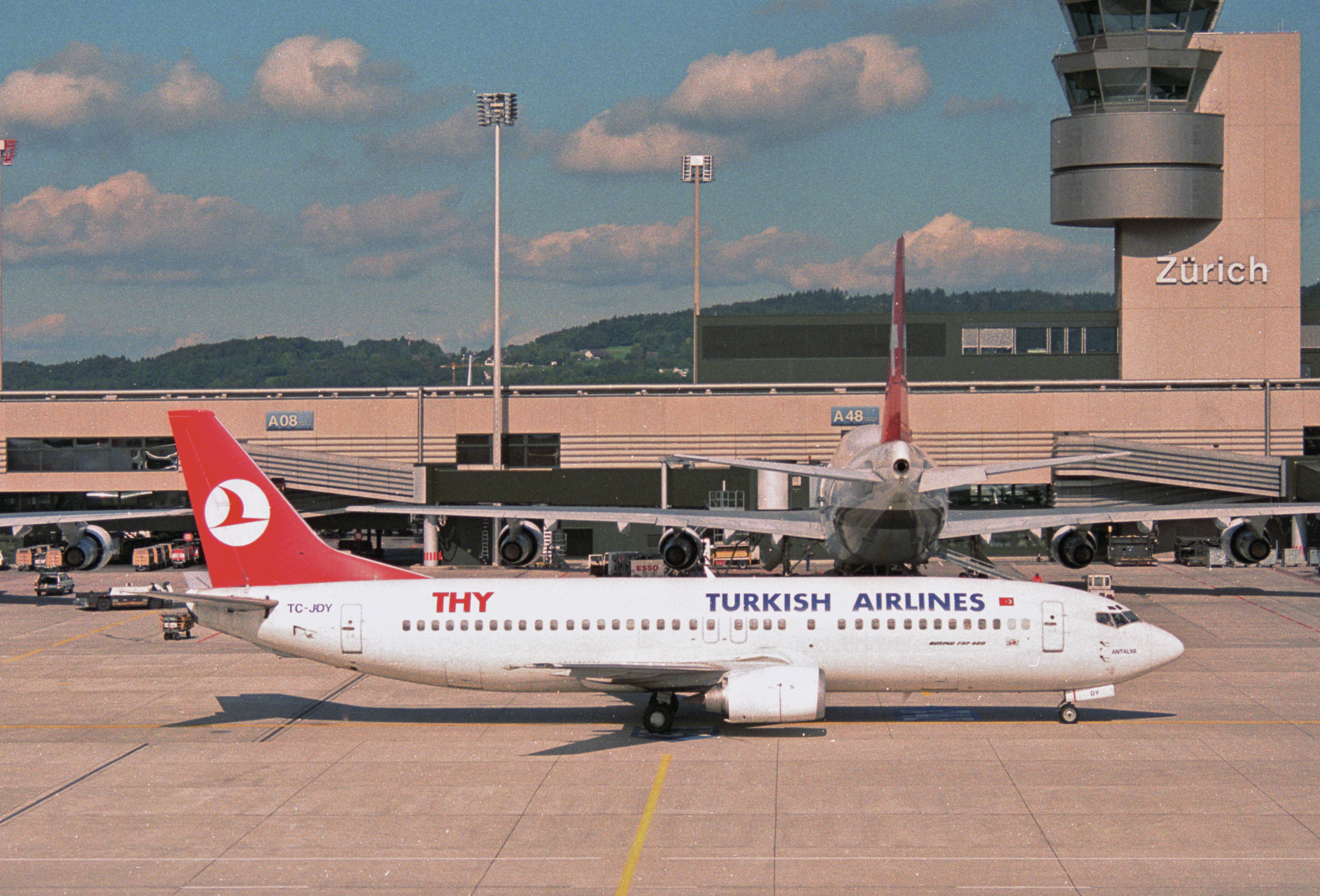
Turkish Airlines Boeing 737 at Zurich Airport in 1995

By the mid-1980s, THY had a fleet of 30 aircraft. It was flying approximately three million passengers a year to 16 domestic destinations and three dozen international ones. The airline was Turkey's largest source of foreign currency. Turkish Airlines began operating Airbus A310s in 1985, allowing the addition of flights to Singapore in 1986. A route to New York City via Brussels was added in 1987.

The company posted losses in 1987 and 1988, largely due to high payments on its dozen new Airbus A310s, according to Air Transport World. The fleet also included 11 Boeing 727s and nine Douglas DC-9s. THY ended the decade with 8,500 employees.

The airline ordered five Airbus A340 aircraft with an option for five more in 1990 to be able to fly to North American and East Asian destinations non-stop. The first A340 was delivered three years later, in 1993.

The company suffered in the global aviation crisis following the Persian Gulf War and would not break even again until 1994. However, the business was again booming in the mid-1990s, with the greatest growth coming from North American destinations. THY launched a nonstop flight to New York City in July 1994.

The company's capital continued to be raised, reaching 10 trillion TL in 1995. During that year, the airline also converted three of its Boeing 727s to dedicated freighters. The DC-9s had been sold off. The company posted a $6 million profit on revenues of $1 billion for the year. While profitable, THY had to contend with Turkey's exorbitant inflation, making capital improvements difficult.

The domestic market was deregulated in 1996, allowing new scheduled competition from charter airlines. At the same time, larger international carriers were providing stiff competition on routes to Western Europe. THY entered into marketing agreements with other international airlines to enhance their competitiveness. The company teamed with Japan Airlines to offer service to Osaka and Tokyo in 1997 and 1998. Other jointly operated flights soon followed with Austrian Airlines, Swissair, and Croatia Airlines. In 1997, THY began to operate flights to Chicago as its second destination in the US.

=== 21st century ===
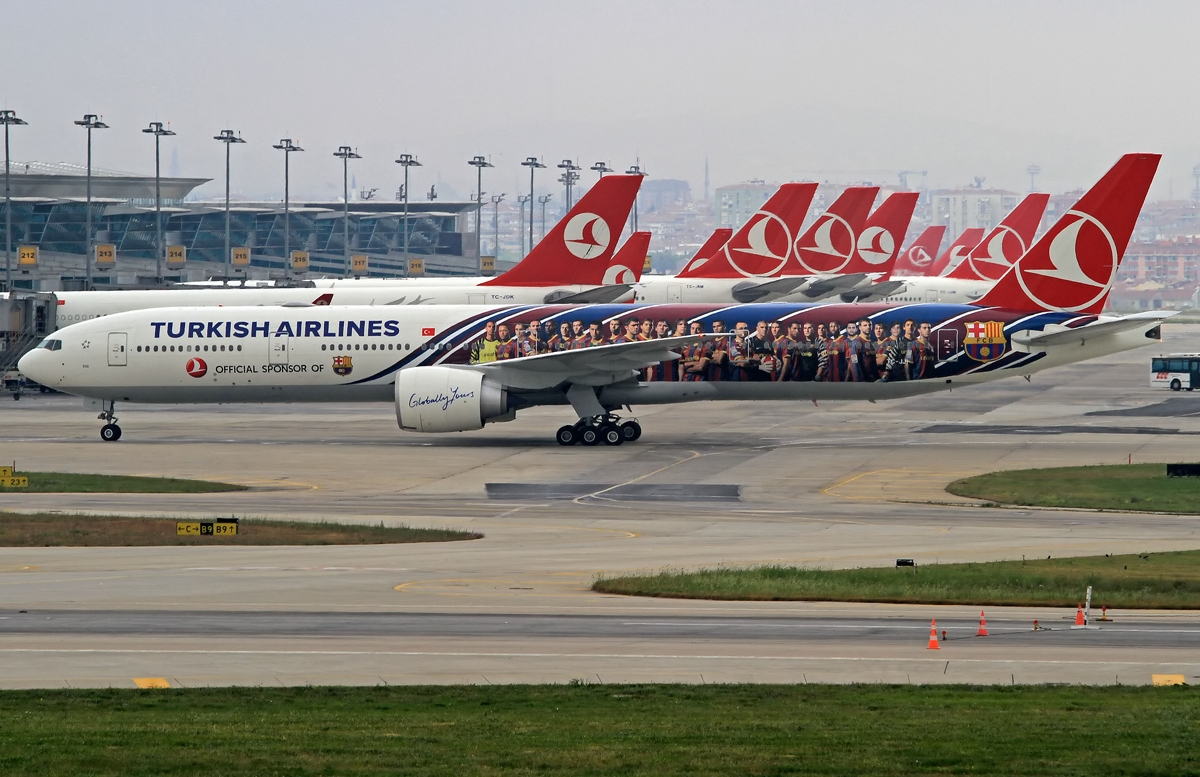
A Turkish Airlines Boeing 777-300ER with the FC Barcelona colours in 2012; the airline was the official sponsor and carrier of the club between 2010 and 2013.

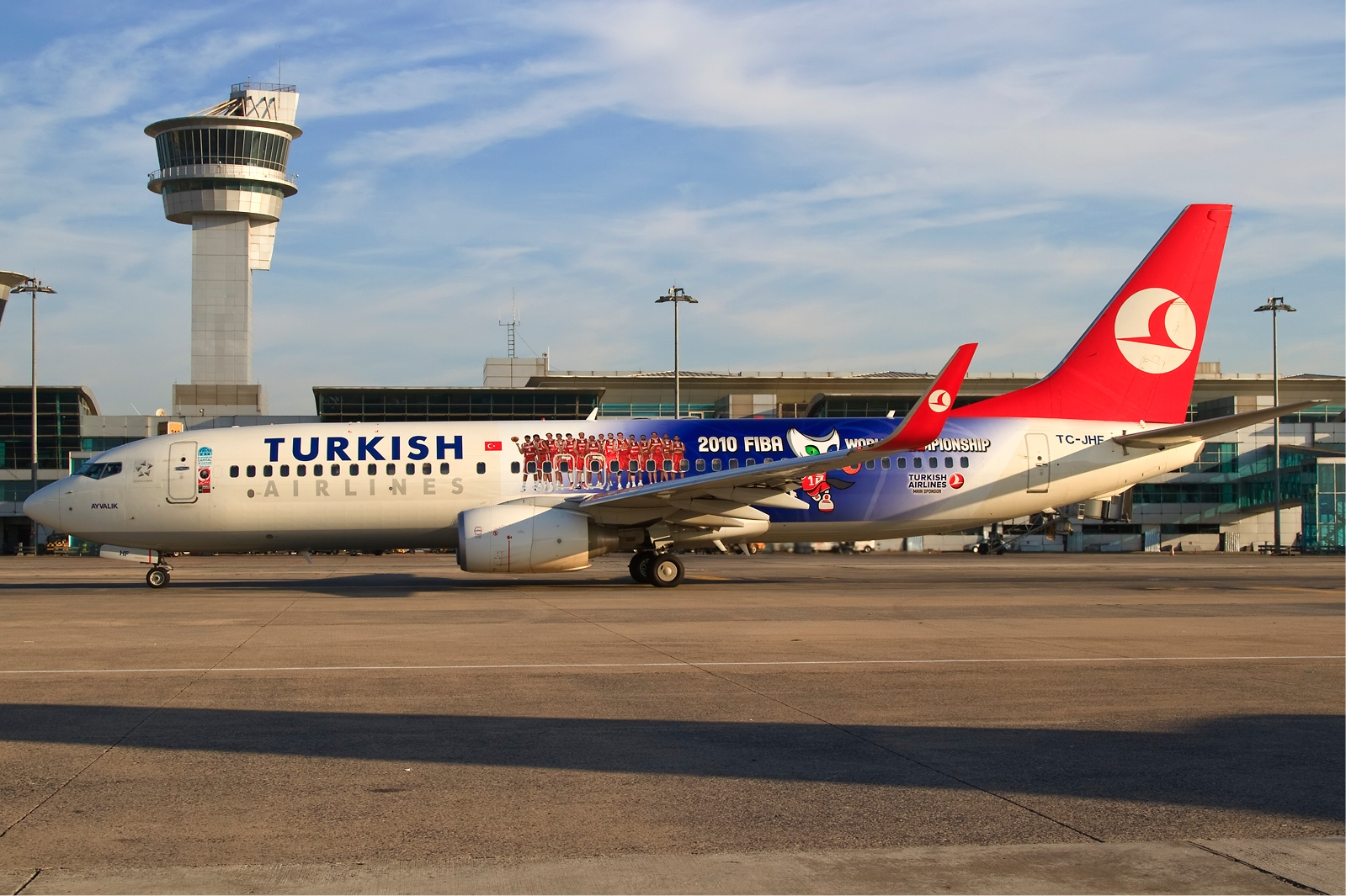
A Turkish Airlines Boeing 737-800 in 2010 FIBA World Championship livery at Istanbul Atatürk Airport

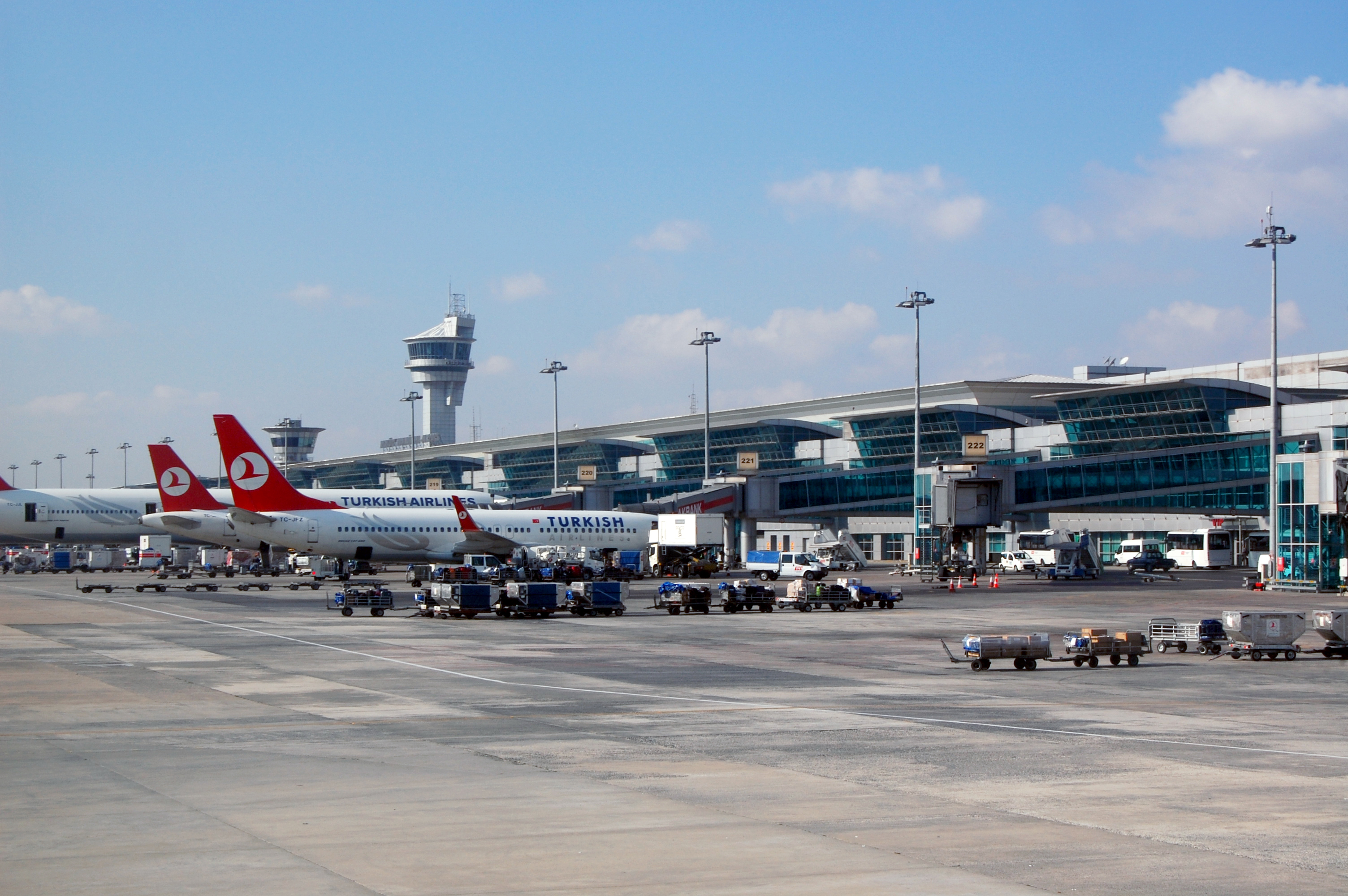
Istanbul Atatürk Airport, November 2013

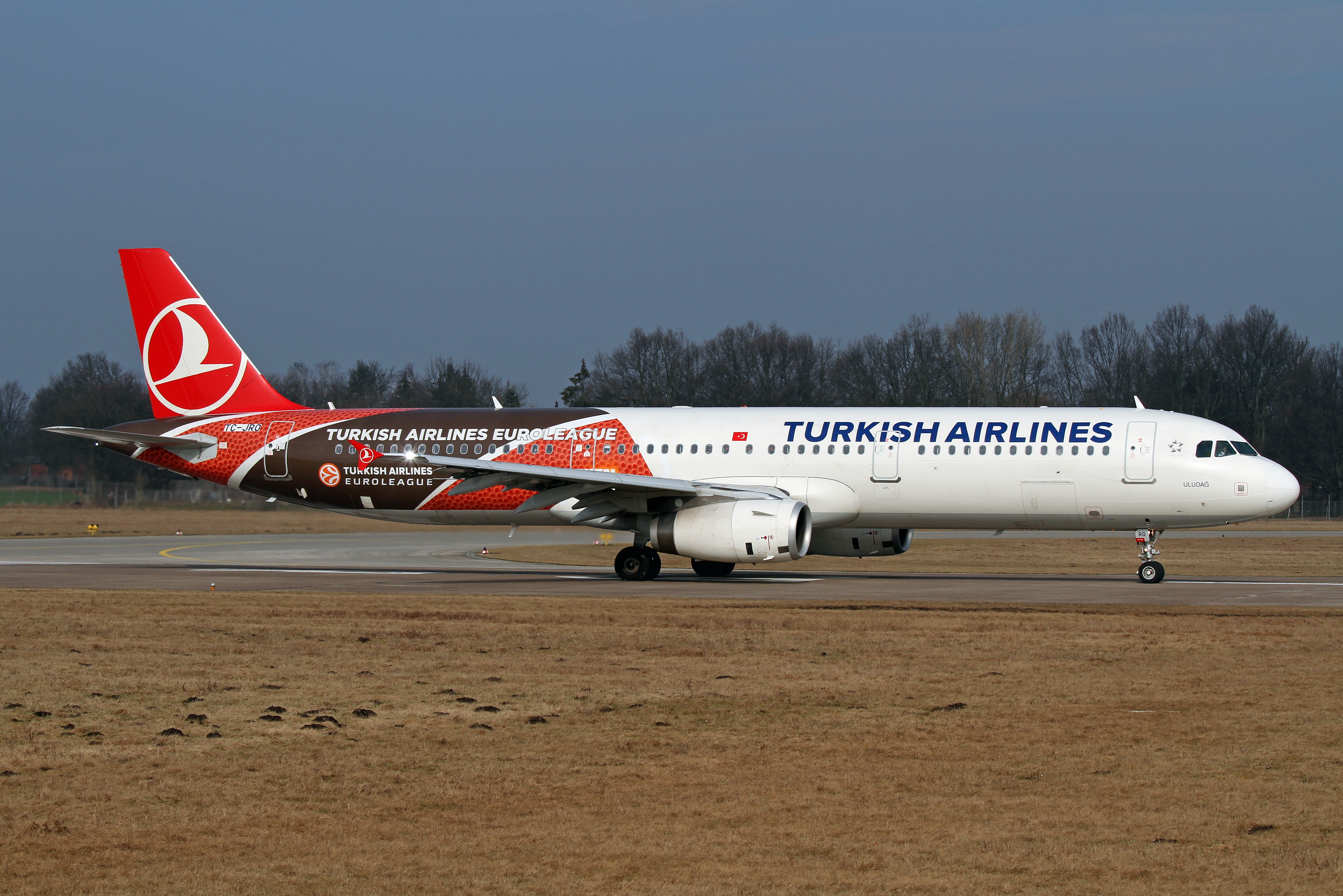
A Turkish Airlines Airbus A321-200 in Turkish Airlines Euroleague livery. The airline has been the primary sponsor of the top European basketball league since 2010.

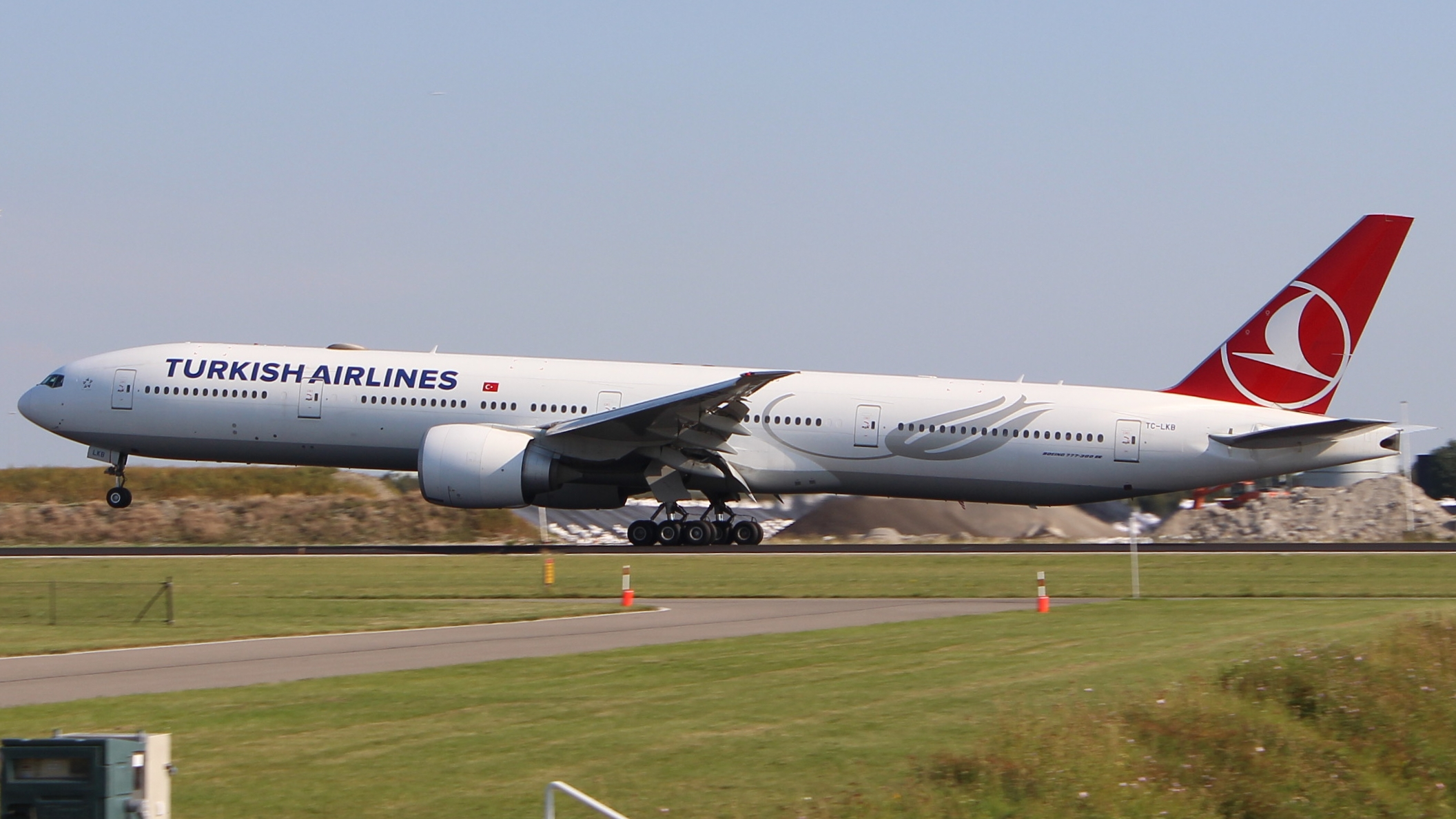
A Turkish Airlines Boeing 777-300ER landing at Amsterdam Schiphol Airport (2020)

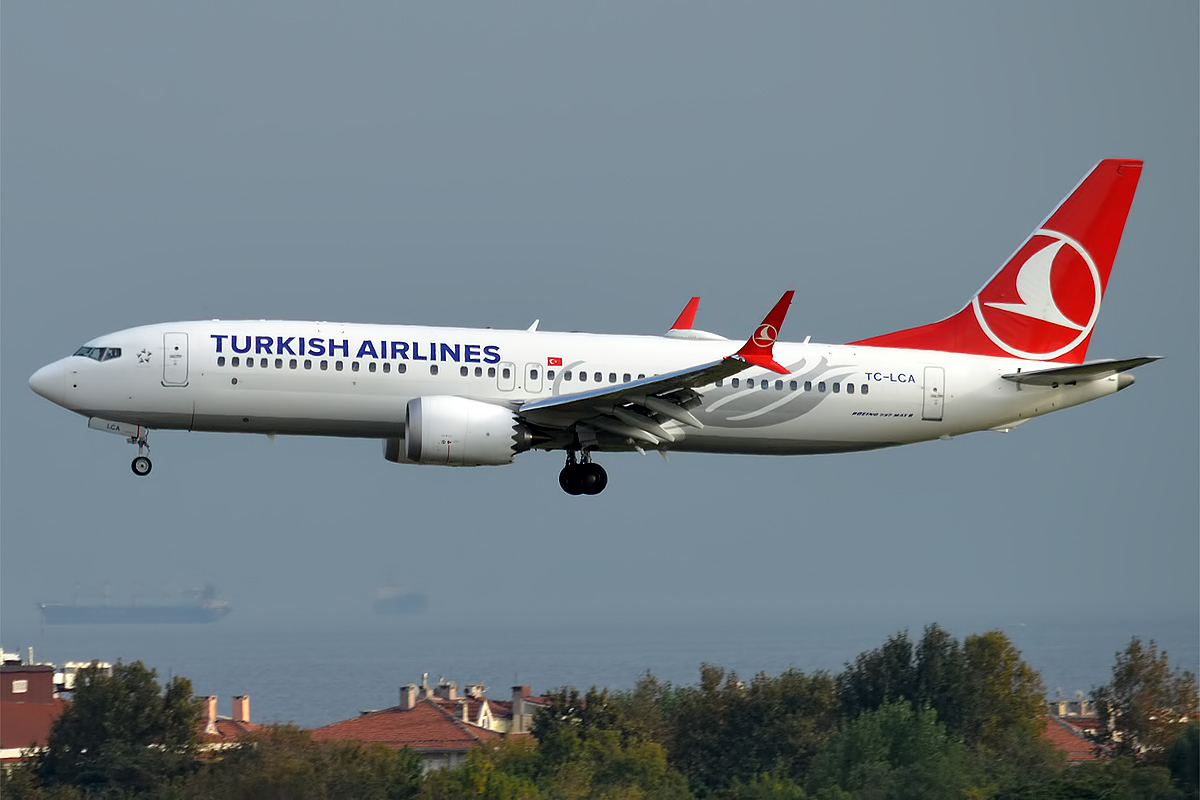
A Boeing 737 MAX 8 of Turkish Airlines on final approach for Istanbul Atatürk Airport (2018)

A new terminal opened in January 2000 at Istanbul Atatürk Airport. Turkish Airlines continued to extend their international reach, forging marketing agreements with Asiana Airlines, American Airlines, Malaysia Airlines, LOT Polish Airlines, Czech Airlines and Cathay Pacific in 2000. On 29 October 2000, THY withdrew from the Swissair-led Qualiflyer alliance to help attract a strategic investor for their privatization. The airline had been part of the alliance's frequent-flyer program since November 1998. An Antalya-Frankfurt route was added in 2001 through a code-sharing agreement with Sun Express.

Turkey underwent an economic crisis throughout most of 2001, leading to a reduction in traffic on domestic routes in particular. THY managed to survive after the September 11 attacks on the United States without a government bailout or mass layoffs, although 300 middle management positions were eliminated, 400 part-timers were laid off and wages were cut 10 percent. Turkish Daily News credited the airline's survival to entrepreneurial management, which was quick to get rid of loss-making routes at home and abroad.

In 2003, the war in Iraq prompted Turkish Airlines to close some routes in the Persian Gulf, while flights to Asia were suspended during the SARS epidemic. However, the airline soon recovered, increasing traffic on existing routes and adding service to Delhi after an 11-year lapse.

Another fleet expansion program kicked off in 2004, helping THY maintain one of the youngest fleets in Europe. In July that year, the airline announced a massive $2.8 billion order of 36 jets from Airbus, plus an order for 15 Boeing 737s.

THY was not just ordering new planes. It was planning to spend $350 million on a new technical and training facility at Istanbul's underutilized Sabiha Gökçen International Airport. The airline had built up a significant technical services operation, maintaining not just its aircraft but those of third parties. Turkish Technic employed 2,700 workers and was planning to hire another 2,000 by 2010. THY also had three flight simulators and offered flight training services.

The airline faced the entry of new competitors into the liberalizing Turkish aviation market. However, tourism was rising, with 20 million people expected to visit the country in 2005 versus 12 million in 2003. THY divested its 50% holding in Cyprus Turkish Airlines (Kıbrıs Türk Hava Yolları) in 2005.

Although the company was publicly traded at this time, the government-owned 98% of its shares. The privatization program was revived in 2004 with a public offering of 20% of shares on the Istanbul Stock Exchange. The Turkish government-owned 75% of shares after the offering, which raised $170 million. Currently, the Turkey Wealth Fund owns a 49.12% interest in THY, while 50.88% of shares are publicly traded.

On 1 April 2008, Turkish Airlines joined the Star Alliance after an 18-month integration process beginning in December 2006, becoming the seventh European airline in the 20-member alliance.

On 29 October 2008, the Bosnian government announced that Turkish Airlines had been picked as the best bidder in an auction for B&H Airlines shares.

In December 2011, the Turkish government unveiled plans to modernize the Aden Adde International Airport in Mogadishu, Somalia, which became one of the newest flight destinations of the carrier in 2012. The rehabilitation project is part of Turkey's broader engagement in the local post-conflict reconstruction process. Among the scheduled renovations are new airport systems and infrastructure, including a modern control tower to monitor the airspace. In March 2012, Turkish Airlines became the first international carrier to resume flights to Somalia since the start of that country's civil war in the early 1990s.

By the end of 2013, Turkish Airlines had increased their number of flight points to 241 destinations worldwide (199 international and 42 domestic). The airline began increasing operations at Istanbul Sabiha Gökçen International Airport as it positioned it as a secondary hub.

Following the 2016 Turkish coup d'état attempt, the Federal Aviation Administration temporarily banned flights between Turkey and the United States. This posed a particular problem for Turkish Airlines as a key component of the airline's strategy was to deliver one-stop journeys between the US and hard-to-reach destinations in Africa, the Middle East, and India. This ban was lifted on 18 July, and Turkish Airlines resumed flights to the U.S. on 19 July after a three-day disruption.

In August 2016, Turkish Airlines announced a profit collapse to a loss of 198 million Euros for the second quarter of 2016 while expecting an overall loss of 10 million passengers for 2016. The airline already announced significant reductions in operations for the upcoming 2016–2017 schedule period with frequency cuts to 45 European and 13 intercontinental routes. Turkish Airlines also announced an overall record loss of 1.9 billion Turkish Lira ($644.4 million) for the first half of 2016.

The following year saw the airline recover, with financial results for 2017 showing an almost 35% increase in turnover, and a return to profitability.

Through the 2010s, Turkish Airlines grew its presence in Africa significantly, going from serving 14 African cities in 2011 to 52 six years later, with the airline claiming to serve the most African airports out of any non-African airline. The airline's growth has been linked to Turkey's increased foreign policy and soft power focus on Africa.

Air Albania was established in 2018 as a public–private partnership with Turkish Airlines. By late 2025, Air Albania faced financial difficulties and legal disputes, and Turkish Airlines withdrew its shareholding.

In 2020, the airline announced its intention to withdraw from international routes at Sabiha Gökçen Airport by transferring these routes to its low-cost subsidiary, AnadoluJet.

In February 2022, Turkish Cargo, the airline's freight subsidiary, relocated all cargo flights and operations from their former base at Istanbul Atatürk Airport to the new Istanbul Airport.

In February 2023, Turkish Airlines confirmed plans to spin off AnadoluJet from an incorporated brand name into an independent airline.

In mid-2025, Air France–KLM, Lufthansa and Turkish Airlines approached Globalia to present bids for a stake in Air Europa; by August, both Air France–KLM and Lufthansa abandoned negotiations, leaving Turkish Airlines as the only known remaining bidder.

== Corporate affairs ==
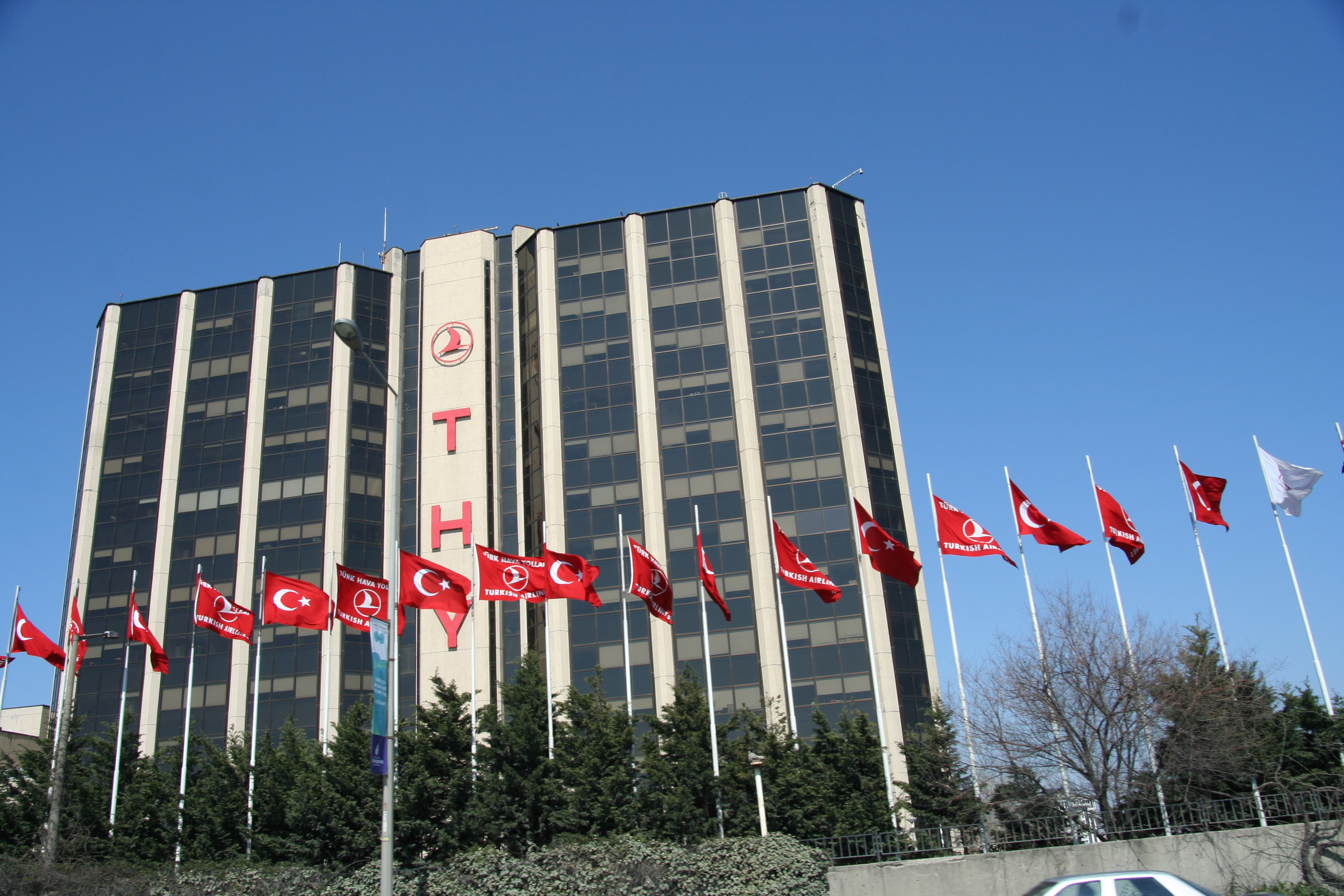
Turkish Airlines General Management Building

The airline head office is in the Turkish Airlines General Management Building at Istanbul Atatürk Airport in Yeşilköy, Bakırköy.

=== Key people ===
On 26 January 2022, İlker Aycı resigned from his position as chairman of the airline. During the board meeting the next day, Ahmet Bolat was elected to become the new chairman. Bilal Ekşi holds the deputy chairman and CEO positions. On 9 April 2026, Ahmet Bolat was reassigned to CEO of Turkish Airlines Inc., and Prof. Murat Şeker was elected as Chairman of the Board.

=== Business trends ===
The key trends for Turkish Airlines are (as of the financial year ending 31 December):

Business figures 2003 – 2025
	Turnover (US$ bn) (Note: including subsidiaries)	Net profit (US$ m)	Number of passengers (m)	Passenger load factor (%)	Cargo carried (000s tonnes)	Number of aircraft	Number of destinations (Note: incl. cargo)	References
2003	2.0	172	10.4	67	123	65	103	
2004	1.9	78.9	12.0	70	135	73	102	
2005	2.1	102	14.1	72	145	83	107	
2006	2.6	126	16.9	69	160	103	134	
2007	4.1	226	19.6	73	183	102	138	
2008	3.9	736	22.6	74	199	127	142	
2009	4.6	372	25.1	71	238	134	156	
2010	5.4	185	29.1	74	314	153	171	
2011	6.2	10.0	32.6	73	388	179	189	
2012	8.3	635	39.0	77	471	200	217	
2013	8.7	317	48.3	79	565	233	243	
2014	10.3	778	54.7	79	668	261	264	
2015	10.5	1,069	61.2	78	720	299	284	
2016	9.7	−77	62.8	74	876	334	295	
2017	10.9	223	68.6	79	1,123	329	300	
2018	12.8	753	75.1	82	1,412	332	306	
2019	13.2	788	74.3	81.6	1,543	350	321	
2020	6.7	−836	27.9	71.0	1,487	363	324	
2021	10.6	959	44.7	67.9	1,879	370	333	
2022	18.4	2,725	71.8	80.1	1,678	394	342	
2023	20.9	6,021	83.3	82.6	1,658	440	345	
2024	22.6	3,425	85.1	82.2	2,000	492	352	
2025	24.0	2,908	92.6	83.2	2,160	516	356	

== Destinations ==
As of 2024, Turkish Airlines flies to 340 destinations (including cargo) in 129 countries, including 53 domestic points. In December 2024, the airline officially earned a Guinness World Record title for connecting the highest number of countries, at 131.

=== Codeshare agreements ===
Turkish Airlines codeshares with the following airlines:

- Aegean Airlines
- Air Algérie
- Air Astana
- Air Cambodia
- Air Canada
- Air China
- Air Europa
- Air India
- Air Montenegro
- Air New Zealand
- Air Serbia
- Air Seychelles
- Air Transat
- airBaltic
- Airlink
- All Nippon Airways
- Asiana Airlines
- Avianca
- Azerbaijan Airlines
- Azul Brazilian Airlines
- Bangkok Airways
- Batik Air Malaysia
- Copa Airlines
- Croatia Airlines
- Egyptair
- Ethiopian Airlines
- Etihad Airways
- EVA Air
- Finnair
- Flynas
- Garuda Indonesia
- Gol Linhas Aéreas Inteligentes
- Gulf Air
- Hong Kong Airlines
- Icelandair
- IndiGo
- ITA Airways
- JetBlue
- KM Malta Airlines
- Kuwait Airways
- LATAM Brasil
- LOT Polish Airlines
- Lufthansa
- Luxair
- Malaysia Airlines
- MIAT Mongolian Airlines
- Middle East Airlines
- Oman Air
- Pakistan International Airlines
- Philippine Airlines
- Royal Air Maroc
- Royal Brunei Airlines
- Royal Jordanian
- RwandAir
- Singapore Airlines
- South African Airways
- TAP Air Portugal
- TAROM
- Thai Airways International
- United Airlines
- Utair
- Uzbekistan Airways
- Vietnam Airlines
- Volaris

=== Interline agreements ===
Turkish Airlines has interline agreements with the following airlines:

- Air Astana
- Air Transat
- APG Airlines
- Austrian Airlines
- Copa Airlines
- Coyne Airways
- Drukair
- Emirates
- Jetstar
- Kuwait Airways
- Lao Airlines
- Loganair
- Southwest Airlines
- Swiss International Air Lines
- Virgin Atlantic

== Fleet ==
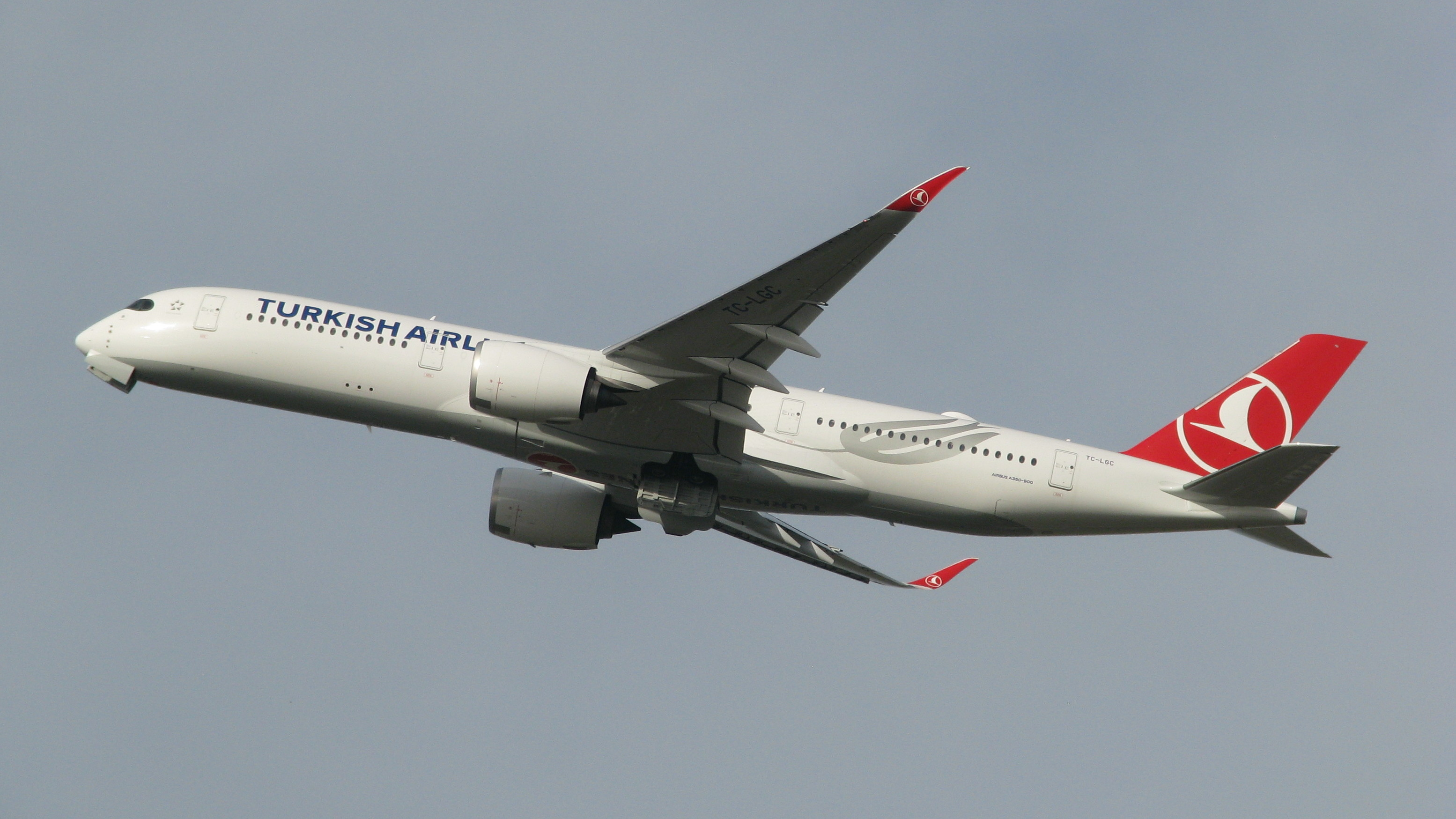
The Airbus A350 is the newest addition to the fleet (pictured 2021)

As of May 2024, Turkish Airlines operates a fleet of 407 (Note: The number of aircraft listed comes from the website of Turkish Airlines, 492, subtracted by the aircraft of AJet, 85.) aircraft, consisting of 13 passenger aircraft types. The airline started operations in 1933 with five aircraft, which grew to 52 in 1945 after the addition of Douglas DC-3s used in the Second World War. This made Turkish Airlines the largest carrier in the Middle East. The first jet-engined aircraft of the airline was a Douglas DC-9, which joined the fleet in 1967. The first wide-body Douglas DC-10 was added in 1972. The airline made major changes to its fleet development in the late-1980s, when the first Airbus A310 arrived, and the Airbus A340 was ordered. The first Boeing 737 arrived a few years later.

Throughout 2004, the airline ordered over 50 aircraft both from Boeing and Airbus. Three Boeing 777-300s were leased in 2008, and later ordered 12 more from Boeing. In 2013, the airline ordered almost 200 aircraft. The airline ordered 25 each of the Boeing 787-9 and Airbus A350-900 in March 2018, which started delivery in 2019 and 2020 respectively.

The airline announced on 11 May 2023, that they will be purchasing around 600 new aircraft which will arrive in a period of 10 years. The Chairman of the Board of Directors and the Executive Committee, Ahmet Bolat has said that the majority of the aircraft will be Airbus and Boeing, with some considered being from "another manufacturer"

In 2023, Airbus announced that Turkish Airlines, will expand its fleet with an order for 220 Airbus aircraft, made up of 150 Airbus’ best-selling A321s and 70 of the world’s most modern and efficient A350 widebody aircraft (50 A350-900s, 15 A350-1000s and 5 A350F freighters).

In September 2025, Turkish Airlines placed a firm order with Boeing for 50 Boeing 787 Dreamliners, including 35 787-9s and 15 787-10s, slated for delivery between 2029 and 2034. Which was later revised as 150 orders.150 737 MAX airplanes, concluding the discussions initiated in 2025 and supporting the flag carrier's expansion goals.

== Frequent-flyer programme ==
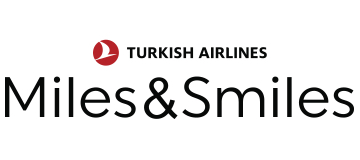
Miles&Smiles logo

Miles&Smiles is the frequent-flyer programme of Turkish Airlines, inaugurated in 2000 after the airline left Qualiflyer. Earned miles can be used on Turkish Airlines flights, as well as on flights operated by the entire Star Alliance network. Miles&Smiles Classic Plus members are entitled to Star Alliance Silver benefits, while Elite and Elite Plus Miles&Smiles status entitles the member to Star Alliance Gold benefits.

=== Miles&Smiles Credit Card ===
Members of the frequent flyer programme also earn miles when paying for their purchases with their Miles&Smiles credit card. Currently, residents of Turkey, Israel, Azerbaijan, Germany, Jordan and the United States are offered with Miles&Smiles credit card by programme member local banks. Credit cards can be issued in the form of American Express, Visa, Mastercard and/or Isracard.

There are also agreements with specific banks in countries across Americas, Asia and Oceania for earning and spending miles.

=== Turkish Airlines Corporate Club ===
Turkish Airlines Corporate Club is a programme created for corporates. The club allows its members to easily arrange business travel with special benefits. The Corporate Club is a part of the Universal Air Travel Plan Network (UATP).

== Sponsorship and promotion agreements ==
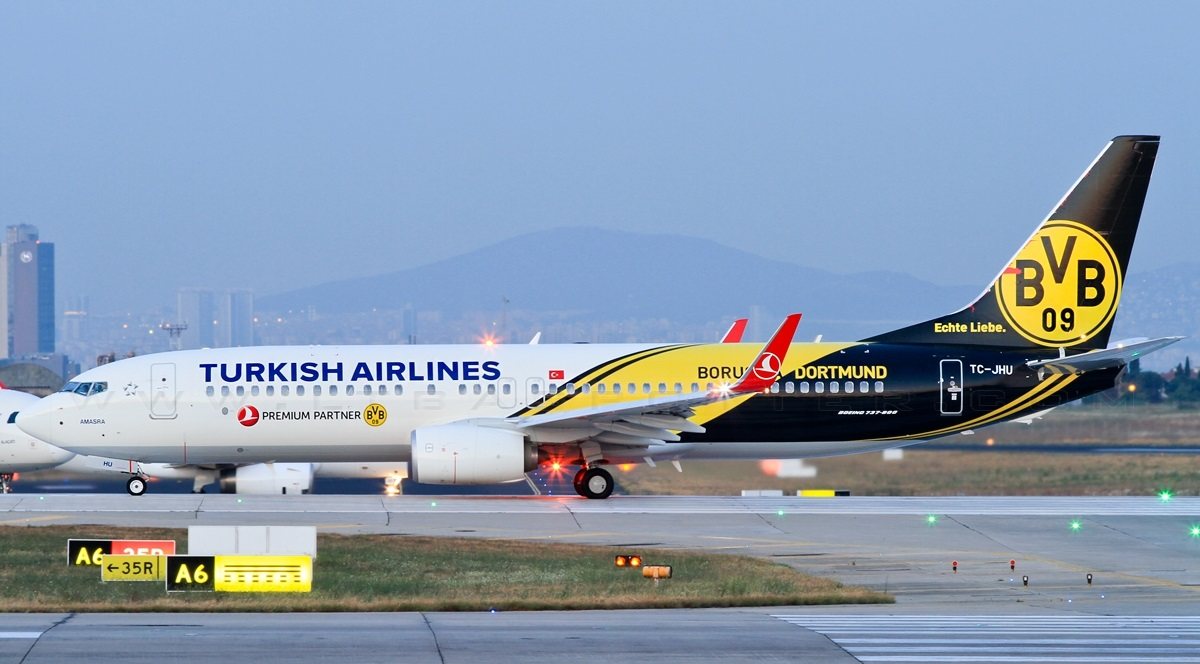
Turkish Airlines also sponsored Bundesliga club Borussia Dortmund.

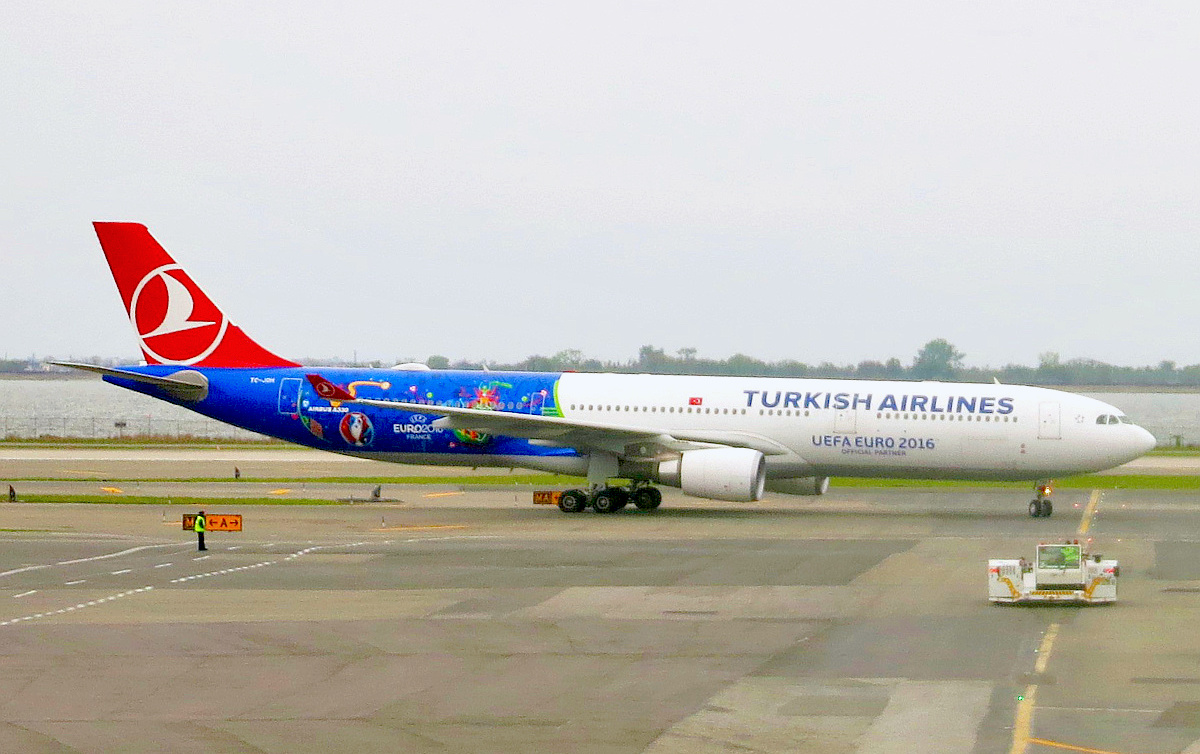
Turkish Airlines Airbus A330-300, decorated with UEFA Euro 2016 emblems

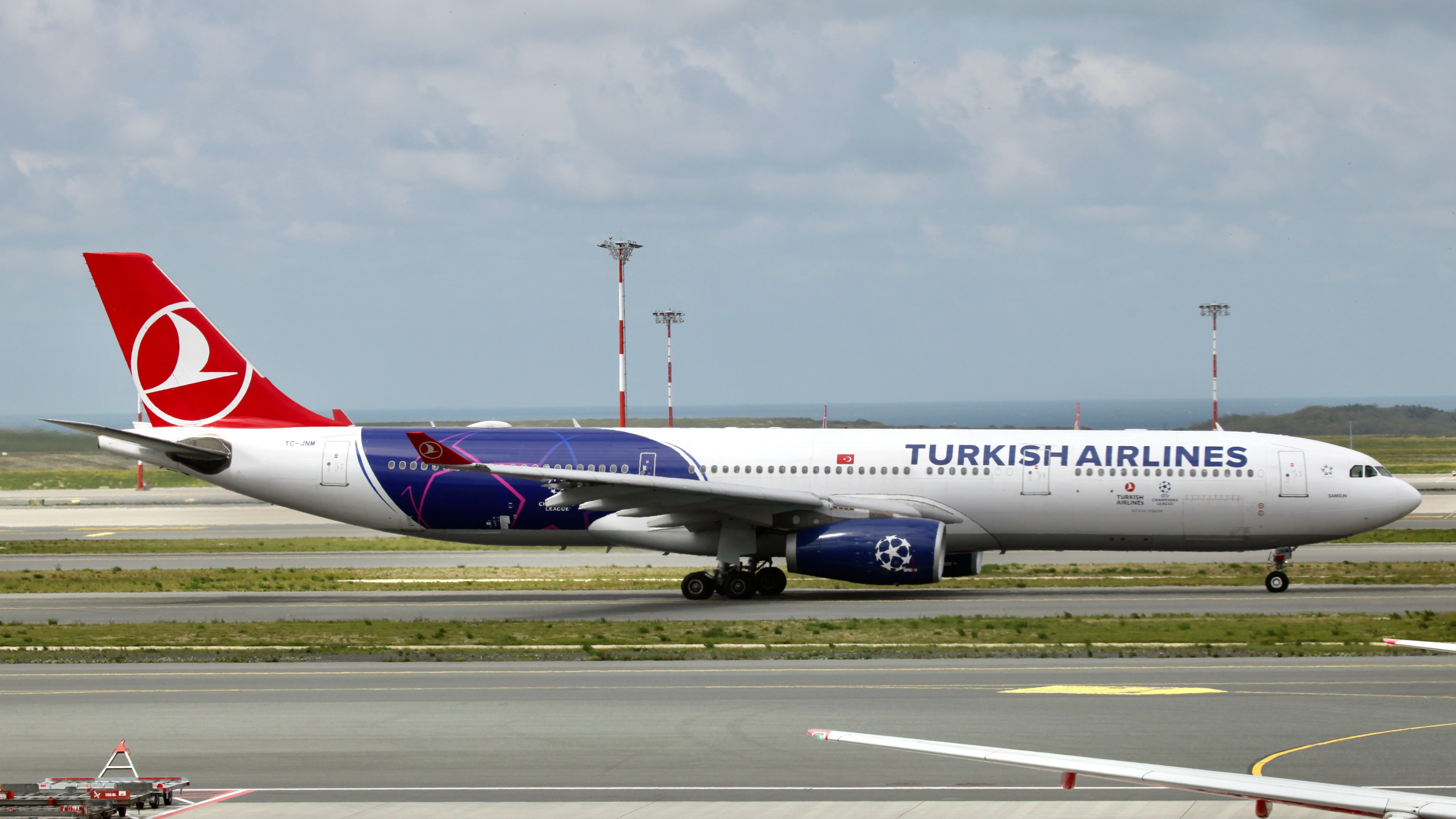
Turkish Airlines Airbus A330-300 with a special UEFA Champions League livery

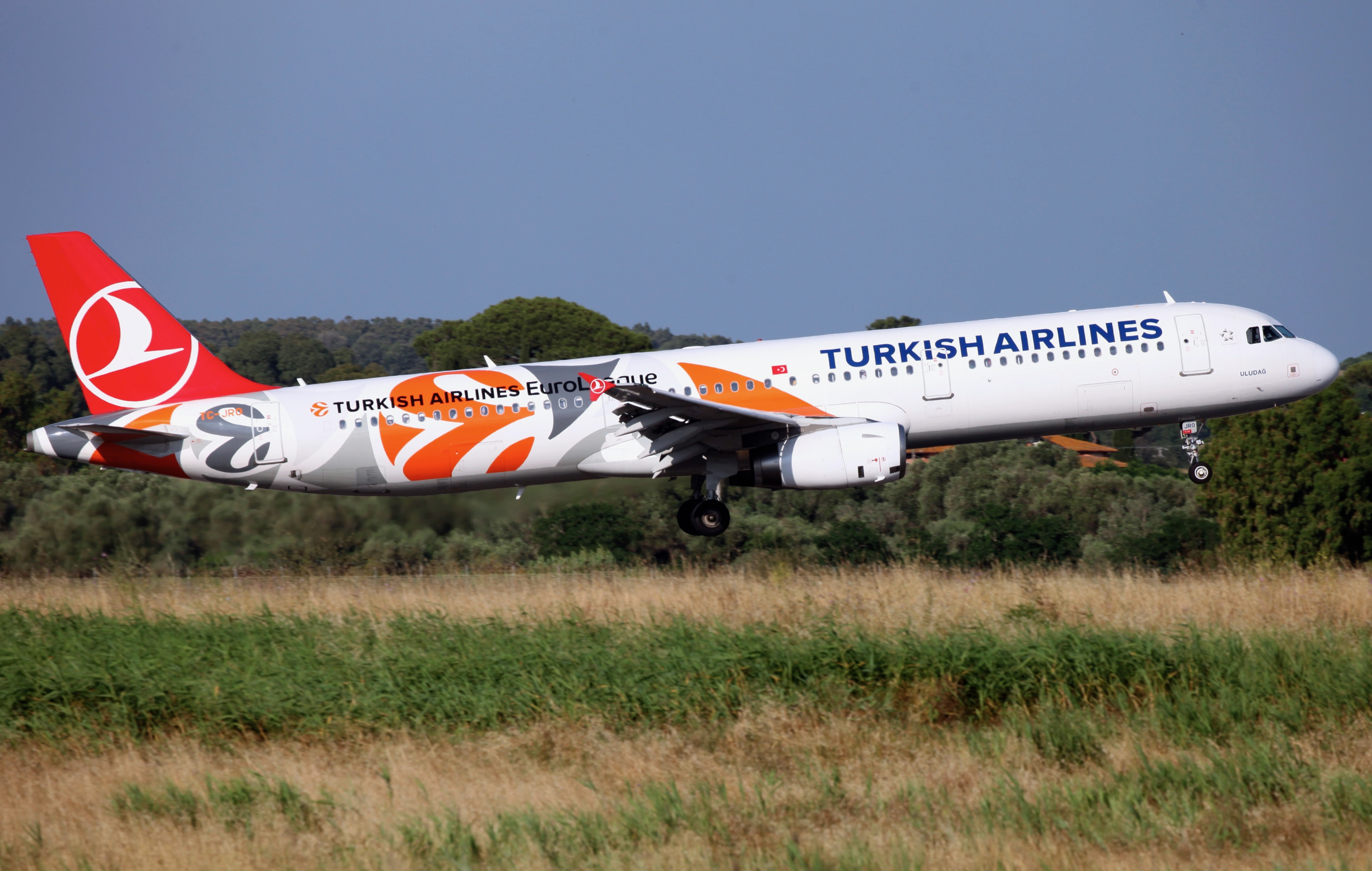
Turkish Airlines Airbus A321-231 with the EuroLeague logo in Rome Fiumicino Airport

Turkish Airlines has been the official carrier of several European football clubs such as Galatasaray, Manchester United, FC Barcelona, Borussia Dortmund, Olympique de Marseille, Aston Villa, FK Sarajevo, and Hannover 96.

The airline has also made sponsorship and promotion deals with renowned athletes and actors, including Lionel Messi, Kobe Bryant, Caroline Wozniacki, Kevin Costner, Wayne Rooney, and Didier Drogba.

The company has been the primary sponsor of the Turkish Airlines EuroLeague since 2010 and was among the sponsors of the 2010 FIBA World Championship.

On 22 October 2013, Turkish Airlines and Euroleague signed an agreement to prolong their existing sponsorship deal by five years until 2020.

Turkish Airlines is the sponsor of the Turkish Airlines Open, a European Tour golf tournament played annually in Turkey since 2013.

Turkish Airlines was the kit sponsor of Galatasaray for the 2014–15 UEFA Champions League and Bosnian club FK Sarajevo. Since then, the airline has continued its sponsorship of Galatasaray and has also been the kit sponsor for the European campaigns of other Turkish clubs such as Trabzonspor and Başakşehir.

On 10 December 2015, Turkish Airlines and UEFA signed a sponsorship deal for the UEFA Euro 2016, becoming the first airline sponsor of UEFA European Championship tournaments.

On 29 January 2016, Turkish Airlines announced its partnership with Warner Bros. to sponsor the film Batman v Superman: Dawn of Justice. In the movie, a pivotal scene unfolds aboard a Turkish Airlines A330. That year, the airline also teamed up with a number of Turkish tourist agencies in the production of the romantic comedy film Non-Transferable. The airline has also collaborated with Warner Bros and Lego by making a Lego Movie themed safety video once in August 2018 and again in February 2019

On 14 September 2018, Turkish Airlines and Lega Basket Serie A, the top-tier professional basketball league in Italy, signed a sponsorship agreement, making the airline an official partner for the 2018–19 LBA season.

In February 2019, Turkish Airlines arranged to become partial sponsors for League of Ireland First Division side Drogheda United.

In August 2019, Turkish Airlines reached an agreement with Club Atlético River Plate to become the main sponsor of the Argentine sports club for the next three seasons.

Prior to the start of the 2022–23 season, Turkish Airlines becomes the official global sponsors of the UEFA Champions League and the Super Cup, UEFA Youth League and the Futsal Champions League for the remainder of the 2021–24 cycle after UEFA agreed to sponsor in the next two seasons.

In May 2026 Turkish Airlines is the Official Airline for Saha Expo 2026, an international aerospace and defence exhibition.

In September 2026 it was announced that they had agreed a five-year deal to become the main club partner of Liverpool Football Club starting from the 2027–28 season. The deal was reported to be worth more than £300 million to the club.

== Turkish Airlines Flight Academy ==
Turkish Airlines Flight Academy (TAFA) was established by the 28th THY Board on 10 November 2004, and started training with 16 cadets on 1 May 2006. The academy is based at Istanbul Atatürk Airport and uses Aydın Çıldır Airport for training activities.

In 2022, the flight academy fleet consists of the following single-and multi-engine aircraft:

- 13 Cessna 172S NAVIII
- 6 Diamond DA-40
- 6 Diamond DA-42 NG

== Turkish Airlines Maintenance Center ==
Turkish Airlines' maintenance, repair and overhaul (MRO) center, Turkish Technic, was incorporated in 2006 and is responsible for the maintenance of Turkish Airlines and other third party aircraft within eight hangars. Capabilities include airframe, landing gear, APU and other subsystems. Turkish Technic opened an engine center in partnership with Pratt & Whitney called TEC (Turkish Engine Center) in January 2010 at Sabiha Gökçen International Airport (SAW). The facility provides engine MRO services to customers worldwide.

Turkish Technic was based at Istanbul Atatürk Airport within two hangars. It bought out MNG Technic along with its hangars, and the main complex moved to SAW with the building of two new hangars. Two smaller hangars are also located at Ankara Esenboğa Airport. Additional hangars are being built at the new Istanbul Airport to accommodate the operator's growing fleet.

== Accidents and incidents ==
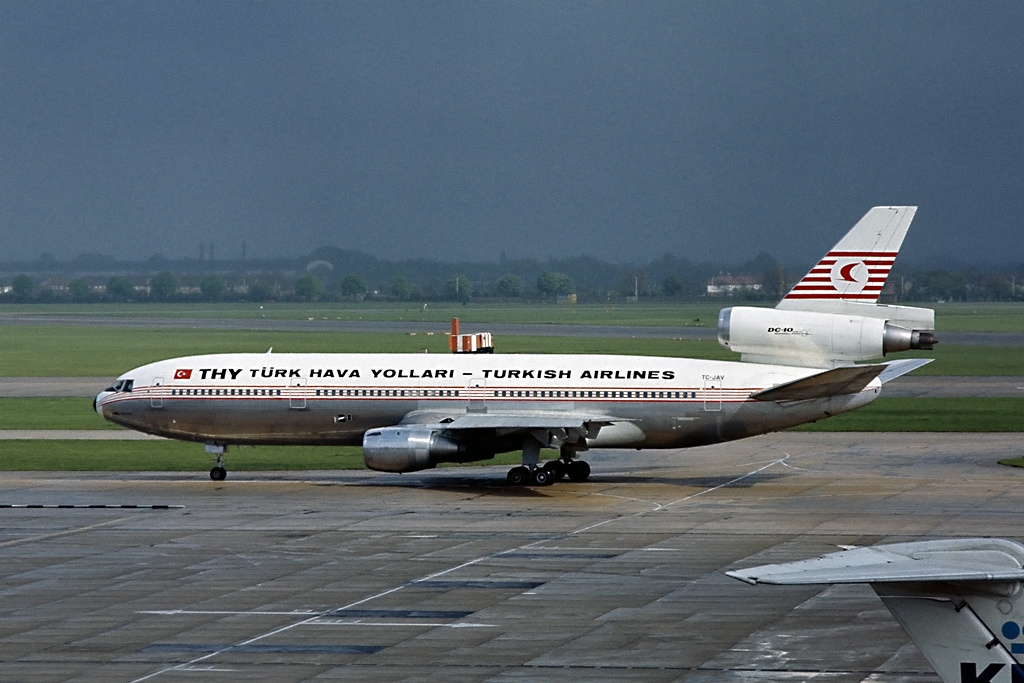
TC-JAV, the Douglas DC-10 that crashed as Flight 981

In its history, Turkish Airlines has suffered a total of 19 incidents and accidents of which 15 were fatal. A total of 68 crew, 835 passengers and 35 people on the ground have been killed.

- On 17 February 1959, a Vickers Viscount Type 793, registration TC-SEV, operating a charter flight carrying Turkish Prime Minister Adnan Menderes and a governmental delegation to London for the signing of the London-Zürich Agreements, crashed in dense fog on approach to London Gatwick Airport. Nine of the sixteen passengers and five of the eight crew lost their lives. Adnan Menderes, who was sitting in the back part of the aircraft, survived the accident.
- On 23 September 1961, Turkish Airlines Flight 835, a Fokker F27-100 registered as TC-TAY, crashed at Karanlıktepe in Ankara Province on approach to Esenboğa Airport. All of the 4 crew and 24 of the 25 passengers on board were killed.
- On 8 March 1962, a Fairchild F-27, registration TC-KOP, crashed into the Taurus Mountains on approach to Adana Şakirpaşa Airport. All three crew and all eight passengers on board died.
- On 3 February 1964, a Douglas C-47, registered as TC-ETI, on a domestic cargo flight, flew into terrain whilst on approach to Esenboğa Airport, Ankara. All three crew members on board were killed.
- On 2 February 1969, a Vickers Viscount Type 794, registered as TC-SET, crashed on approach to Esenboğa Airport. There were no casualties.
- On 26 January 1974, Turkish Airlines Flight 301, a Fokker F28-1000 registered as TC-JAO crashed shortly after takeoff from Izmir Cumaovası Airport due to atmospheric icing on the wings. The aircraft disintegrated and caught fire, killing 4 of the 5 crew and 62 of the 68 passengers on board.
- On 3 March 1974, Turkish Airlines Flight 981, a McDonnell Douglas DC-10 registered as TC-JAV, crashed into Ermenonville Forest, Fontaine-Chaalis, Oise, France, due to explosive decompression, killing all 335 passengers and 11 crew on board. The main cause was a design fault on the cargo doors of the McDonnell Douglas DC-10 which led to incomplete engagement of the door locking mechanism on the aircraft in question, and consequent opening of one door in flight.
- On 30 January 1975, Turkish Airlines Flight 345, a Fokker F28-1000 registration TC-JAP, crashed into the Sea of Marmara during final approach to Istanbul Yeşilköy Airport. All 4 crew and all 38 passengers on board the aircraft were killed.
- On 19 September 1976, a Boeing 727-200 registered as TC-JBH operating Turkish Airlines Flight 452 from Istanbul Yeşilköy Airport to Antalya Airport struck high ground in the Karatepe Mountains during an attempted landing in Isparta instead of Antalya by pilot error. All 8 crew and 146 people on board the aircraft perished in the accident.
- On 23 December 1979, a Fokker F28-1000, registration TC-JAT, on a flight from Samsun-Çarşamba Airport to Esenboğa Airport, struck a hill in Kuyumcuköy village in Çubuk, Ankara, 32 km (20 mi) northeast of its destination airport in severe turbulence. Three of the four crew and thirty-eight of the forty-one passengers on board were killed.
- On 16 January 1983, Turkish Airlines Flight 158, a Boeing 727-200 registered as TC-JBR, landed about 50 m (160 ft) short of the runway at Esenboğa Airport in driving snow, broke up and caught fire. All of the 7 crew survived; however, of the 60 passengers on board, 47 were killed.
- On 29 December 1994, Turkish Airlines Flight 278, a Boeing 737-400 registration TC-JES, crashed during its final approach to Van Ferit Melen Airport in driving snow. Five of the seven crew and fifty-two of the sixty-nine passengers died.
- On 7 April 1999, Turkish Airlines Flight 5904, a Boeing 737-400 registered as TC-JEP on a repositioning flight, crashed near Ceyhan, Adana shortly after taking off from Adana Şakirpaşa Airport. There were no passengers on board, but all six crew members perished in the accident.
- On 8 January 2003, Turkish Airlines Flight 634, an Avro RJ-100 registration TC-THG, crashed on approach to Diyarbakır Airport, Turkey. Of the 80 people on board, all 5 crew and 70 passengers were killed.
- On 3 October 2006, Turkish Airlines Flight 1476 en route from Tirana, Albania to Istanbul was hijacked by Turkish citizen Hakan Ekinci in Greek airspace. The hijacker surrendered after a forced landing in Brindisi, Italy.
- On 25 February 2009, Turkish Airlines Flight 1951, a Boeing 737-800 registered as TC-JGE carrying 128 passengers and a crew of 7, crashed during final approach to Amsterdam Airport Schiphol, Netherlands. It was determined that a faulty radar altimeter caused the aircraft to throttle the engines back to idle and that the crew subsequently failed to react properly which resulted in an unrecoverable stall and the subsequent crash. Of the 135 people on board, 9 people, including the 3 pilots, were killed. Eighty-six more people were transported to local hospitals.
- On 3 March 2015, Turkish Airlines Flight 726 veered off the runway on landing at Tribhuvan International Airport, Kathmandu, Nepal. The Airbus A330-300 operating the flight, TC-JOC, was severely damaged when its nose gear collapsed, causing damage to the fuselage and both wings. All 227 passengers and 11 crew members on board escaped with 1 injury reported. The aircraft was scrapped afterwards.
- On 25 April 2015, Turkish Airlines Flight 1878, an Airbus A320-200 TC-JPE was severely damaged in a landing accident at Istanbul Atatürk Airport. All on board were successfully evacuated without any injuries reported.
- On 16 January 2017, Turkish Airlines Flight 6491, a Boeing 747-412F operated for Turkish Airlines under wet lease from ACT Airlines, crashed into a residential area upon attempting landing in Manas International Airport in Bishkek, Kyrgyzstan, killing all four crew members and 35 people on the ground. In response, Turkish Airlines released a statement on Twitter that neither plane nor crew were theirs, calling it an "ACT Airlines accident". However, the flight was still operated under a Turkish Airlines flight number, making it a Turkish Airlines flight under IATA rules.
- On 21 November 2019, Turkish Airlines Flight 467, a Boeing 737-800, suffered a nose gear collapse while attempting to land in heavy crosswinds at Odesa International Airport in Ukraine. All passengers and crew were deplaned using emergency slides without injury. The aircraft, TC-JGZ, was declared a hull loss and scrapping was commenced in 2020.

== See also ==
- List of airlines of Turkey
- Aviation in Turkey
- Türk Hava Yolları SK
