= Cyprus Turkish Airlines =

Turkish Cypriot airline

Cyprus Turkish Airlines Kıbrıs Türk Hava Yolları
IATA	ICAO	Call sign
YK	KYV	AIRKIBRIS
- Founded: 1974
- Commenced operations: 1975
- Ceased operations: 21 June 2010
- Hubs: Ercan International Airport
- Frequent-flyer program: Miles&Smiles (Turkish Airlines)
- Alliance: Star Alliance (affiliate; 2008-2010)
- Fleet size: 7
- Destinations: 18
- Headquarters: North Nicosia, Northern Cyprus
- Key people: Bilal Ekşi
- Website: www.kthy.net (archived 23 July 2011)

Cyprus Turkish Airlines Limited (Turkish: Kıbrıs Türk Hava Yolları Ltd. Şti. (KTHY)) was a Turkish Cypriot airline that served as the flag carrier for Northern Cyprus. Until its collapse in June 2010, Cyprus Turkish Airlines was the primary airline flying passengers to Northern Cyprus.

KTHY operated scheduled flights from Ercan, Northern Cyprus, to several cities in Turkey, the United Kingdom, and Western and Northern Europe. Its main base was Ercan Airport, in the Turkish sector of Nicosia.

The airline was de jure registered as a Turkish company in Istanbul. Day-to-day operations were run from Ercan. All flights to Europe were required to make a stop at an airport in mainland Turkey.

From the cessation of the airline's activity until the establishment of Fly Kıbrıs Airlines in 2023, Northern Cyprus did not see the return of any airline operations.

== History ==
Cyprus Turkish Airlines was established on 4 December 1974 in Nicosia, with shares equally divided between Turkish Airlines and the Cash Development of the Consolidated Fund of the Assembly of the Turkish Cypriot Community (Konsolide Fonu Inkisaf Sandigi). The first scheduled flight took place on 3 February 1975.

In 2005, the Turkish government sold its shares to Ada Havayollari.

In order to avoid bankruptcy due to a $100 million debt, the management decided to sell the company in June 2010. After the end of the bidding period, the Turkish carrier Atlasjet was the only bidder.

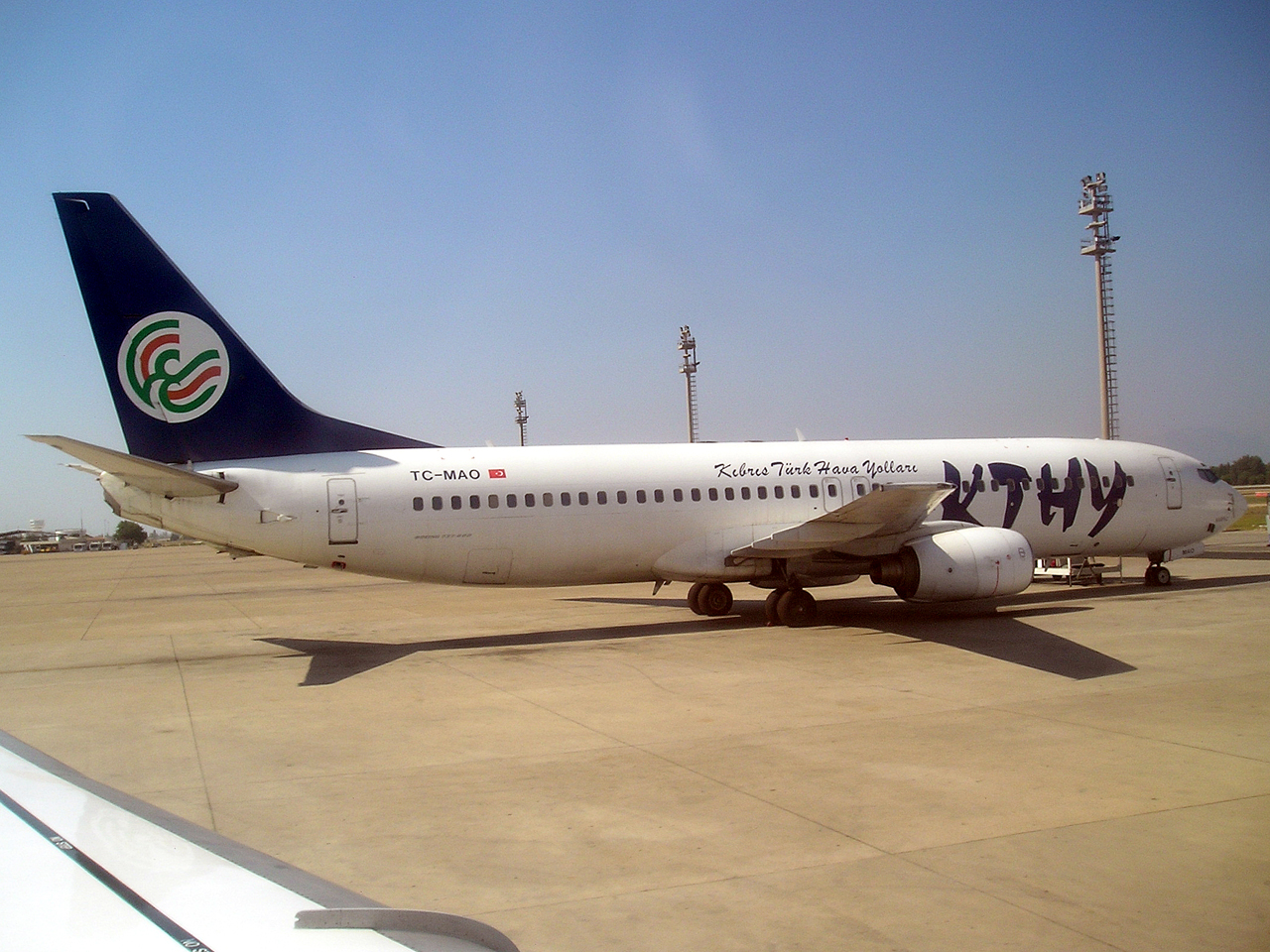
KTHY Boeing 737-800 at Antalya Airport, Turkey, wearing 2000–2009 livery (2005)

On 21 June 2010, the airline announced via its website that it had ceased all operations until further notice. On 29 June 2010, it was announced that the airline had gone out of business.

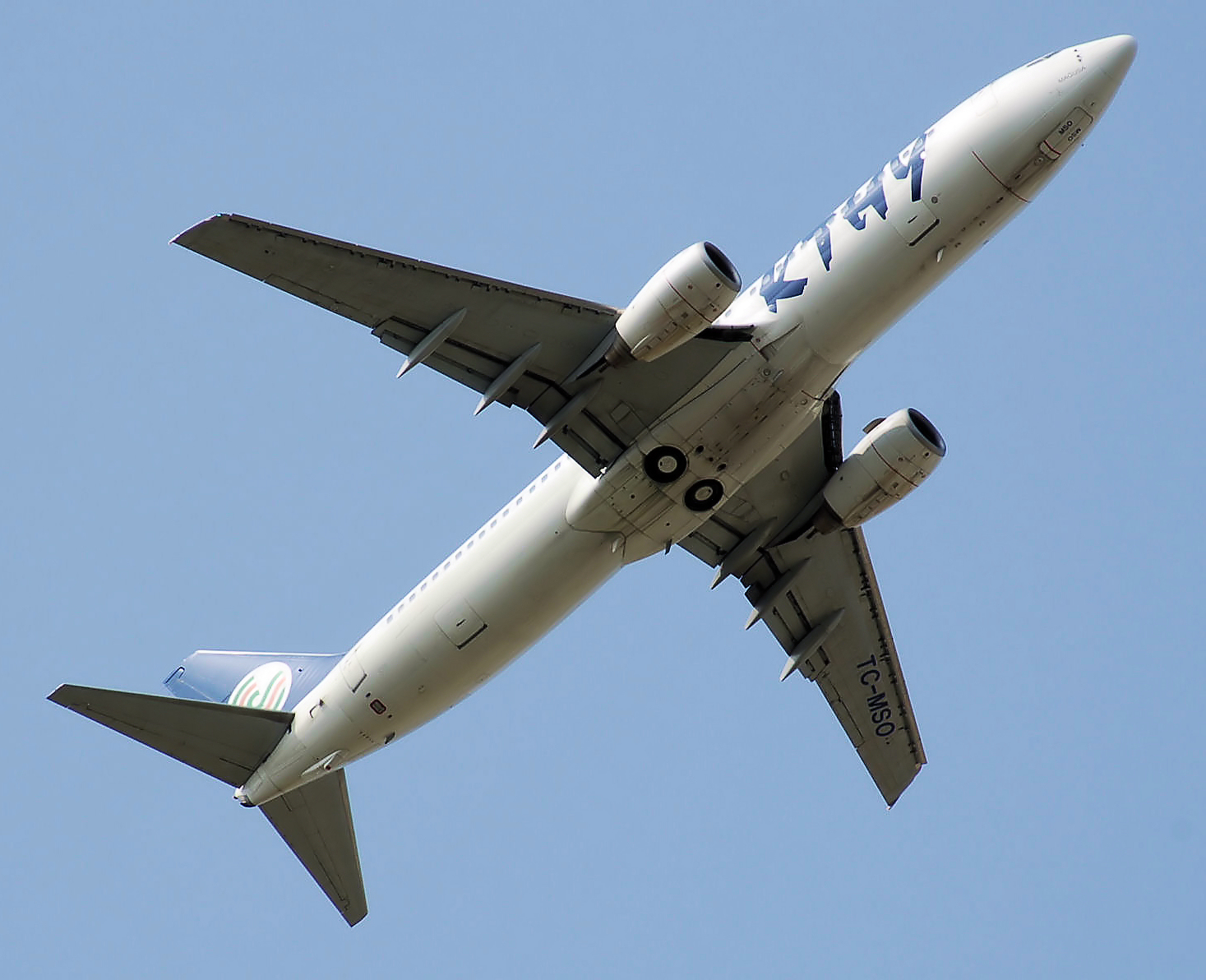
KTHY Boeing 737-800 (2007)

=== Timeline ===
- 1975 – First scheduled flight takes place on 3 February
- 1976 – Airline begins leasing aircraft including DC-9s, Boeing 727-200s, and Boeing 720s
  - Sales office opens in Kyrenia
- 1977 – Company registered in Istanbul, Turkey
- 1981 – Scheduled flights to London begin
- 1990 – Two 727-200s purchased
- 1991 – Ground operations staff and cockpit/cabin crew employed
- 2000 – Airline begins leasing two Boeing 737-800s long-term
- 2002 – Upon completion of technical flight hours, all four 727-200s are grounded and sold
- 2004 – Airline begins leasing three Airbus A321-200s long-term
  - In-flight magazine Caretta re-introduced
- 2006 – ISO 9001-2000 Quality Control System certificate obtained in April
  - Departure Control System begins operating at Ercan International Airport
  - Ground services in Turkish airports contracted to HAVAŞ in December
- 2007 – Cyprus Airport Services formed, following on from KTHY's partnership with HAVAŞ
- 2008 – Male cabin staff added
  - Protocol for flights to Sweden, Norway, and Finland signed with DETUR
- 2009 – First scheduled flight to the Nordics on 7 February, to Helsinki
  - Charter flights to Italy, Romania, Slovenia, and Hungary planned
  - Airline receives delivery of one Airbus A320-200
  - Planned expansion of fleet to 12 aircraft by 2012 announced
- 2010 – Operations cease on 21 June
  - Bankruptcy declared on 19 September
- 2014 – Re-launch as Karpas Airlines planned for April

== Fleet ==
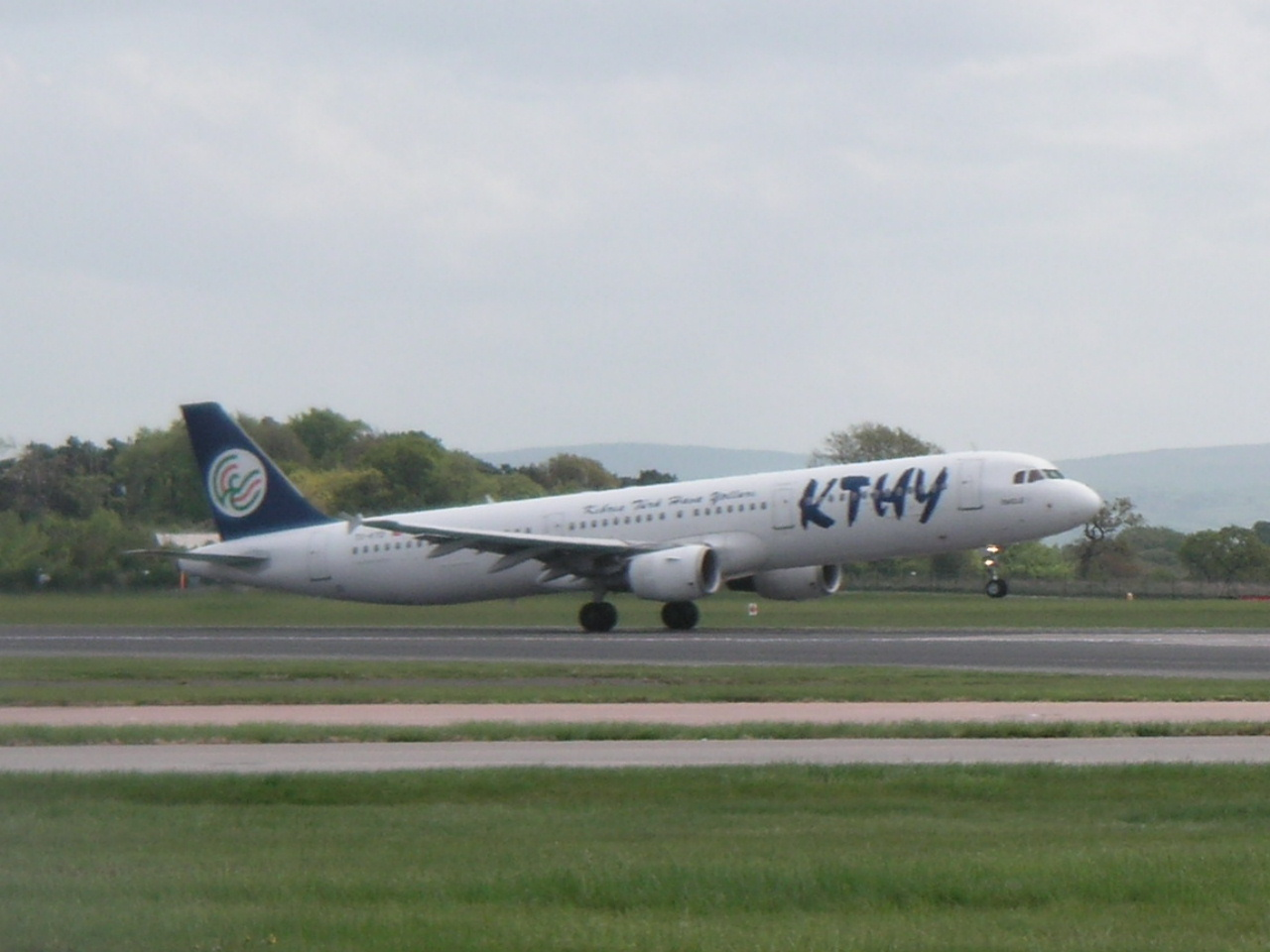
"Iskele", a Cyprus Turkish Airlines Airbus A321, named after the Cypriot city of İskele, taking off from Manchester Airport, England (2009)

As of 13 March 2010, the Cyprus Turkish Airlines fleet consisted of the following aircraft:

Aircraft	Number	Passengers	Notes
Airbus A320-232	1	180	Operated by Turkuaz Airlines
Airbus A321-211	2	209	1 operated by AtlasJet
Boeing 737-800	4	177	
Total	7		

== Services ==
=== Travel classes ===
Cyprus Turkish Airlines offered only two classes:

- Economy: This class was offered on all of the new aircraft. Full meal or snack service was provided free of charge. In-flight entertainment was not offered.
- Economy Plus: This class was introduced after KTHY's elimination of Business and First Class services years earlier, due to the grounding of its Airbus A310s and Boeing 727s.

=== Express check-in ===
In early 2008, the airline introduced an express check-in service at Ercan for passengers who were not checking any bags. There were separate express check-in counters for passengers with only carry-on luggage and for those without any luggage at all.

=== Frequent flyer programme ===
The airline had a "Special Passenger Programme for Frequent Flyers". Participants had priority for seat reservations and an extra baggage allowance, avoided waiting at check-in, and earned points redeemable for travel.

== Personnel ==
All Cyprus Turkish Airlines flight attendants were women until the start of the 2008 summer schedule in July, when the airline began using male flight attendants as well.

=== Strike action ===
On 7 April 2010, starting at 6 a.m., Cyprus Turkish Airlines staff staged a six-hour wildcat strike that grounded all planes. Travellers to and from Northern Cyprus were distressed and severely inconvenienced, and communication from the airline to travelers about the delays was poor.

== In-flight magazine ==
A monthly, in-flight magazine was produced for KTHY, titled Caretta. It generally contained information about Northern Cyprus such as cultural background, tourist destinations, and upcoming events. The magazine was also available on the airline's website.

== Hijacking ==
On 30 March 1998, Mehmet Ertürk hijacked a KTHY flight from Ercan to Ankara, using a lighter designed to resemble a hand grenade. The plane landed safely in Ankara, and Ertürk was arrested.

== See also ==
- List of airlines of Northern Cyprus
