= Turkish Engine Center =

Turkish company

Turkish Engine Center (TEC) is a joint venture between Pratt & Whitney and Turkish Technic for the maintenance, overhaul, and repair of CFM56 and V2500 turbofan aircraft engines.

TEC is located at Istanbul’s smaller international airport, Sabiha Gökçen Airport in Anatolia. TEC started operations in January 2010 and has an annual capacity of 200 shop visits. The facility occupies approximately 25,000 m^{2} (269,000 square feet). TEC currently employs around 250 people. Their repair capabilities include an information technology system, enhanced with methodology for engine overhaul practices, that provides services to airline operators in Europe, Middle East, North Africa, and CIS countries.

== Engine maintenance capabilities ==
TEC has a B1 rating capability which includes inspection, testing, repair, modification, and overhaul of the listed engines, including powerplant/EBU hardware and electrical harnesses.
Engine maintenance services are provided for the following types of engines:

- CFMI CFM56-7B
- IAE V2500-A5

== Turkish Technic ==
Turkish Airlines Maintenance Center (Turkish Technic) is the maintenance, repair, and overhaul center of Turkish Airlines. It is based in Istanbul Atatürk International Airport (IST). Currently, Turkish Technic operates in three hangars at IST and one hangar in Ankara Esenboğan International Airport (ESB) in a total enclosed area of 130,000 m^{2} with a total workforce of about 3,000 employees. Turkish Technic has established a third new maintenance center at Sabiha Gökçen International Airport on the Eastern side of Istanbul.
