= International Defence Industry Fair =

Defense technology sales exhibition

İDEF International Defence Industry Fair İDEF Uluslararası Savunma Sanayi Fuarı
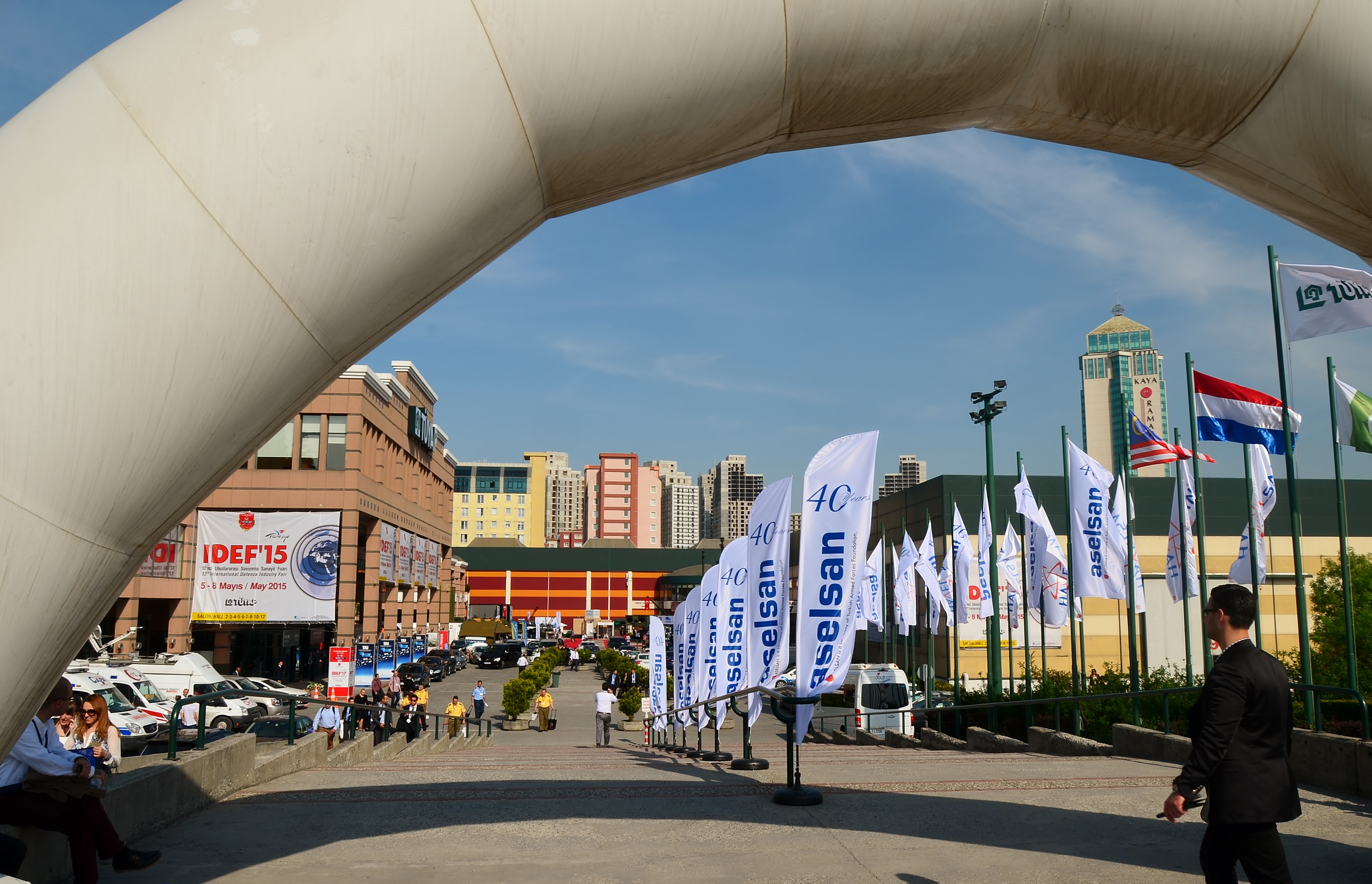
- IDEF '15 held in May 2015 at TÜYAP Fair Ground, Istanbul
- Status: Active
- Genre: Fair
- Frequency: Bi-annually
- Country: Turkey
- Inaugurated: 1993
- Founder: Turkish Armed Forces Foundation
- Most recent: 2023
- Next event: 2027
- Participants: More than 400 companies from 44 countries (2025)
- Area: 120,000 m2, 12 halls
- Website: IDEF

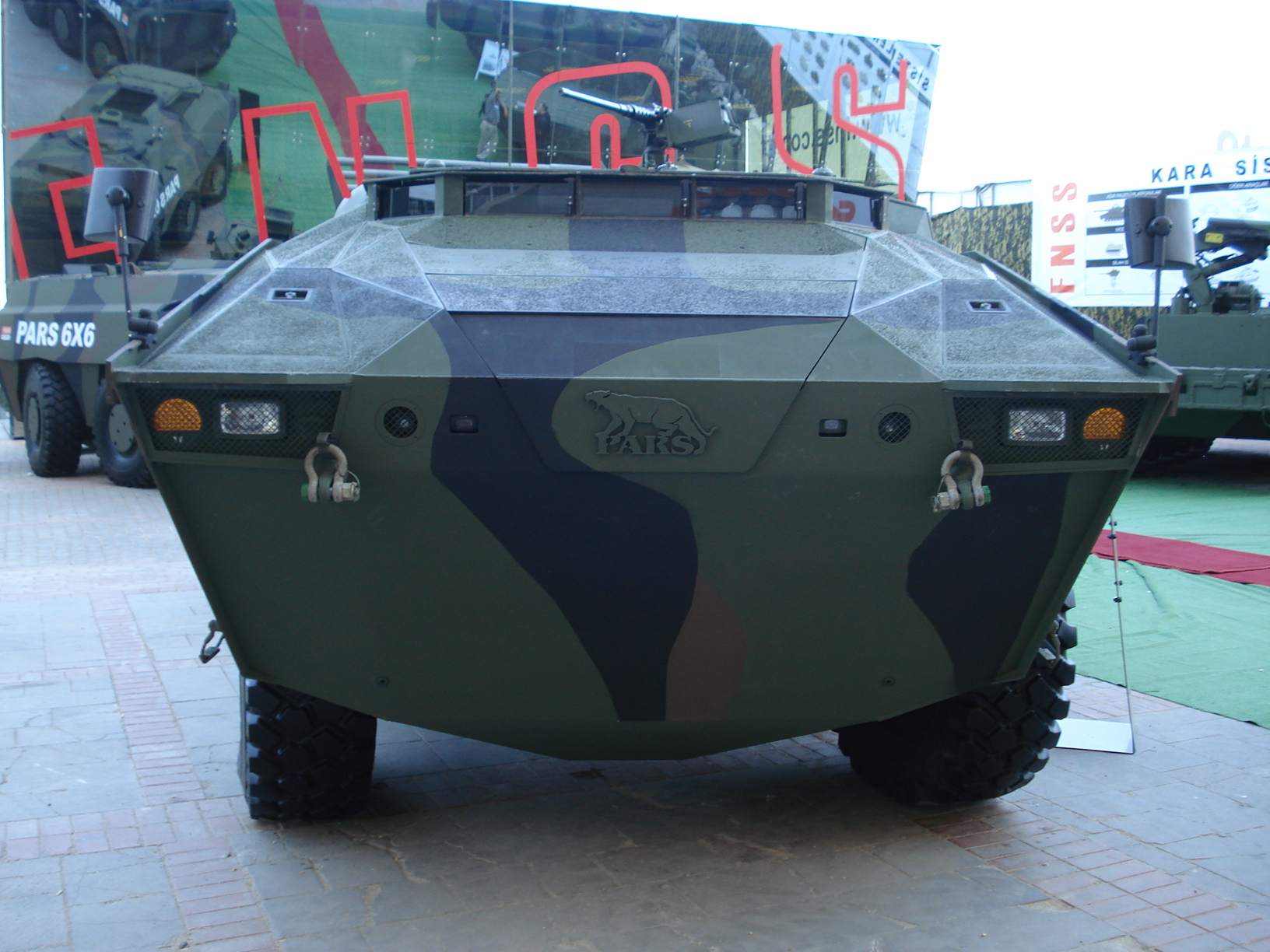
An FNSS Pars 8x8 armoured personnel carrier at IDEF 2007 in Ankara

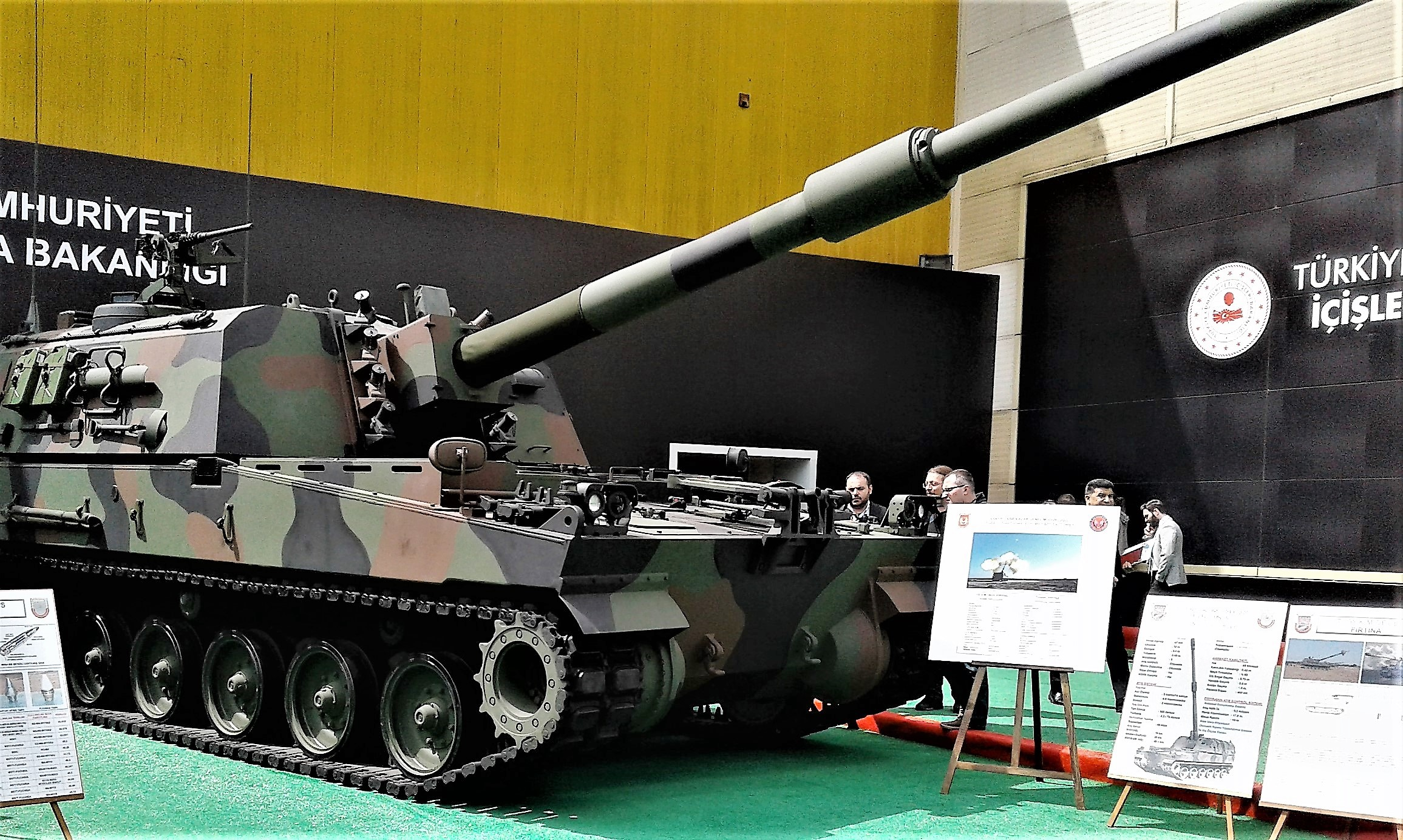
An T-155 Fırtına howitzer at the IDEF 2019 in Istanbul

The International Defence Industry Fair or İDEF (Turkish: İDEF Uluslararası Savunma Sanayi Fuarı) is a defence industry fair held in Turkey and organized by the Turkish Armed Forces Foundation since 1993. The TAF Foundation organizes the IDEF once in every two years and before each fair it chooses the organizer firm and exhibition venue by calling a tender. The exhibitions generally take place in Ankara or Istanbul.

The fair has been held every odd year since 1993. IDEF, as a high technology defence industry fair, incorporating main defence industry branches and their subordinates, is an essential international marketing arena for defence industry companies. IDEF is the biggest defence industry fair in Eurasian region and one of the top four in the world with an increasing trend in terms of the number of participating countries, delegations and companies.

== See also ==
- Saha Expo, Defence, Aviation and Aerospace Fair in Istanbul
- IDEAS, Pakistani biannual Defence exhibition in Karachi
