= Saha Expo =

Defense industry fair held in Istanbul

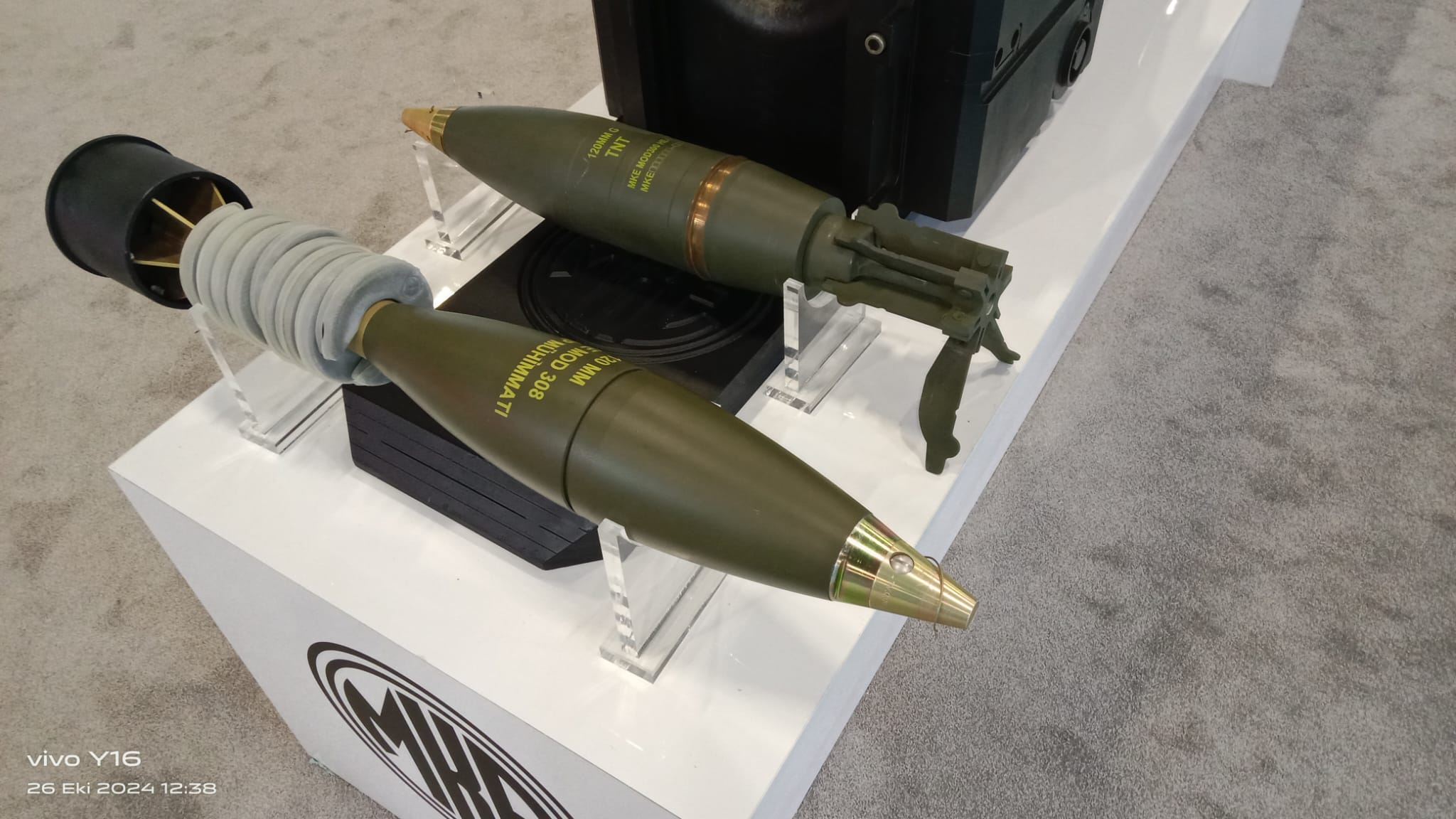
- Status: Active
- Genre: International Defence and Aerospace Exhibition
- Frequency: Biennially
- Country: Turkey
- Inaugurated: 2018
- Founder: Association of SAHA Istanbul Defence, Aviation and Aerospace Cluster
- Next event: May 5-9th 2026
- Website: sahaexpo.com

The Saha Expo is a defense industry fair held in Turkey, and organized by the Association of SAHA Istanbul Defence, Aviation and Aerospace Cluster (Turkish: SAHA İstanbul Savunma, Havacılık ve Uzay Kümelenmesi Derneği). It was first held in 2018, and took place at Istanbul Fair Center Yeşilköy, Bakırköy.

The organizing association was formed in Istanbul by 27 defense companies in 2015. The fair hosts the products of companies, which design, develop and manufacture subsystems and components of advanced technology platforms in the field of defense, maritime, aviation and aerospace. It is planned that the event will be recurring Biennially. The fair is sponsored mainly by major Turkish defense companies, but also by local defense contractors.

183 companies, including 31 foreigner exhibitors, participated at the 2018 fair. Notable participants were ASELSAN, Baykar, BMC, Boeing, FNSS, HAVELSAN, Kale Group, MKE, Ministry of National Defence, military plants and naval shipyards, ROKETSAN, Turkish Airlines Maintenance, TÜMOSAN, Turkish Aerospace Industries and Tusaş Engine Industries.

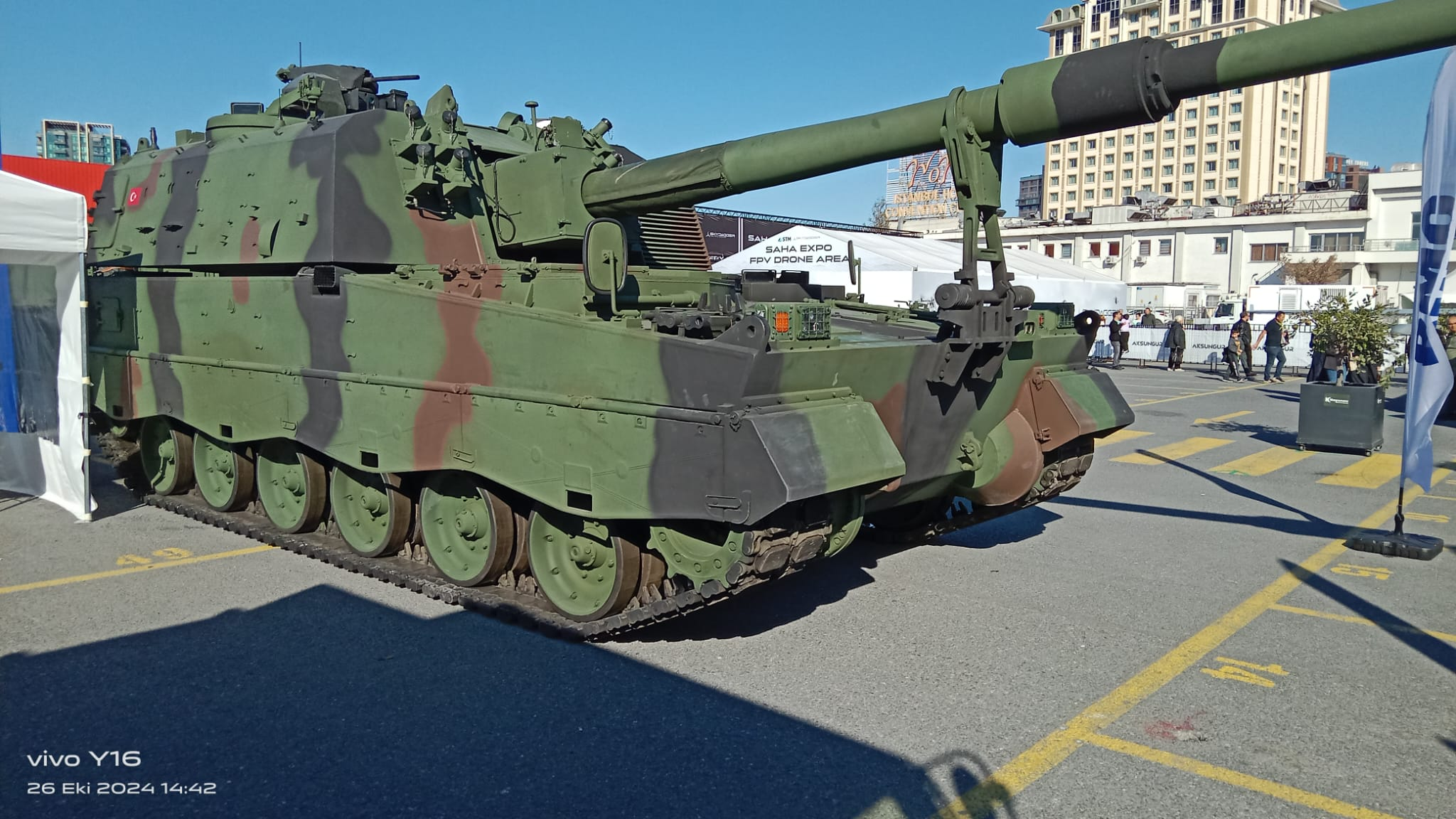

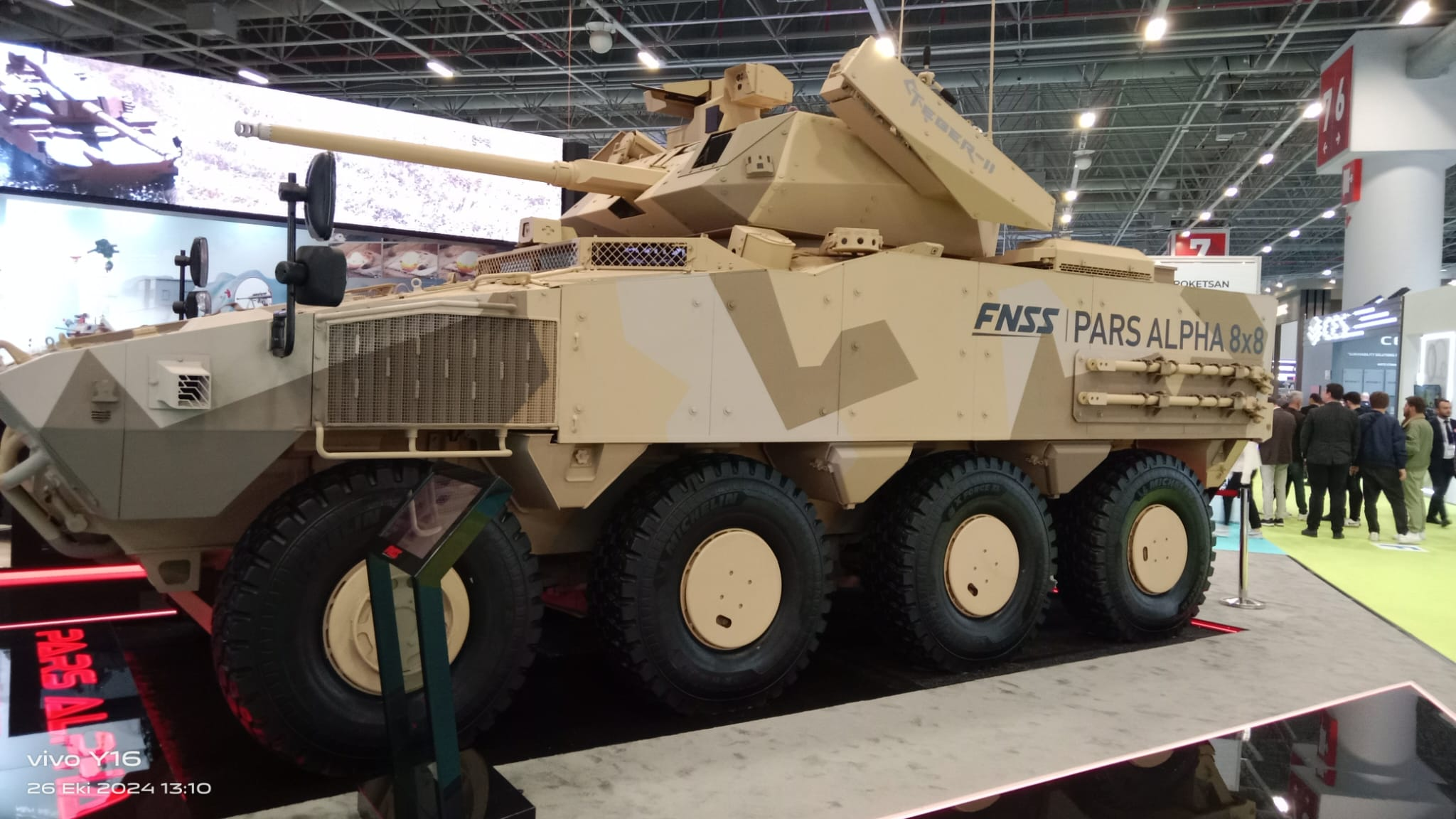

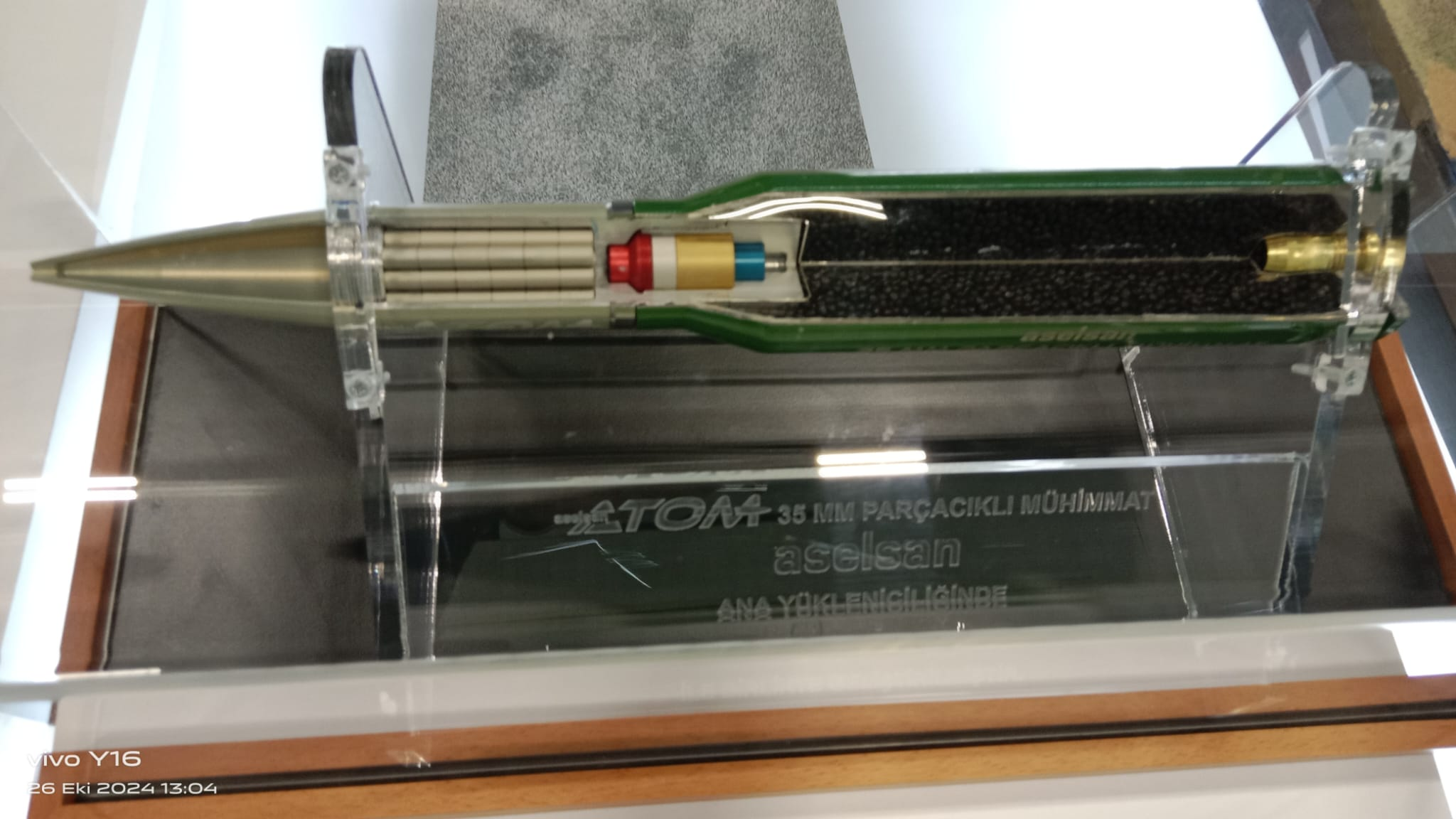

== See also ==
- International Defence Industry Fair (IDEF)
