= Turkish Technic =

MRO center of Turkish Airlines

Turkish Technic Inc.

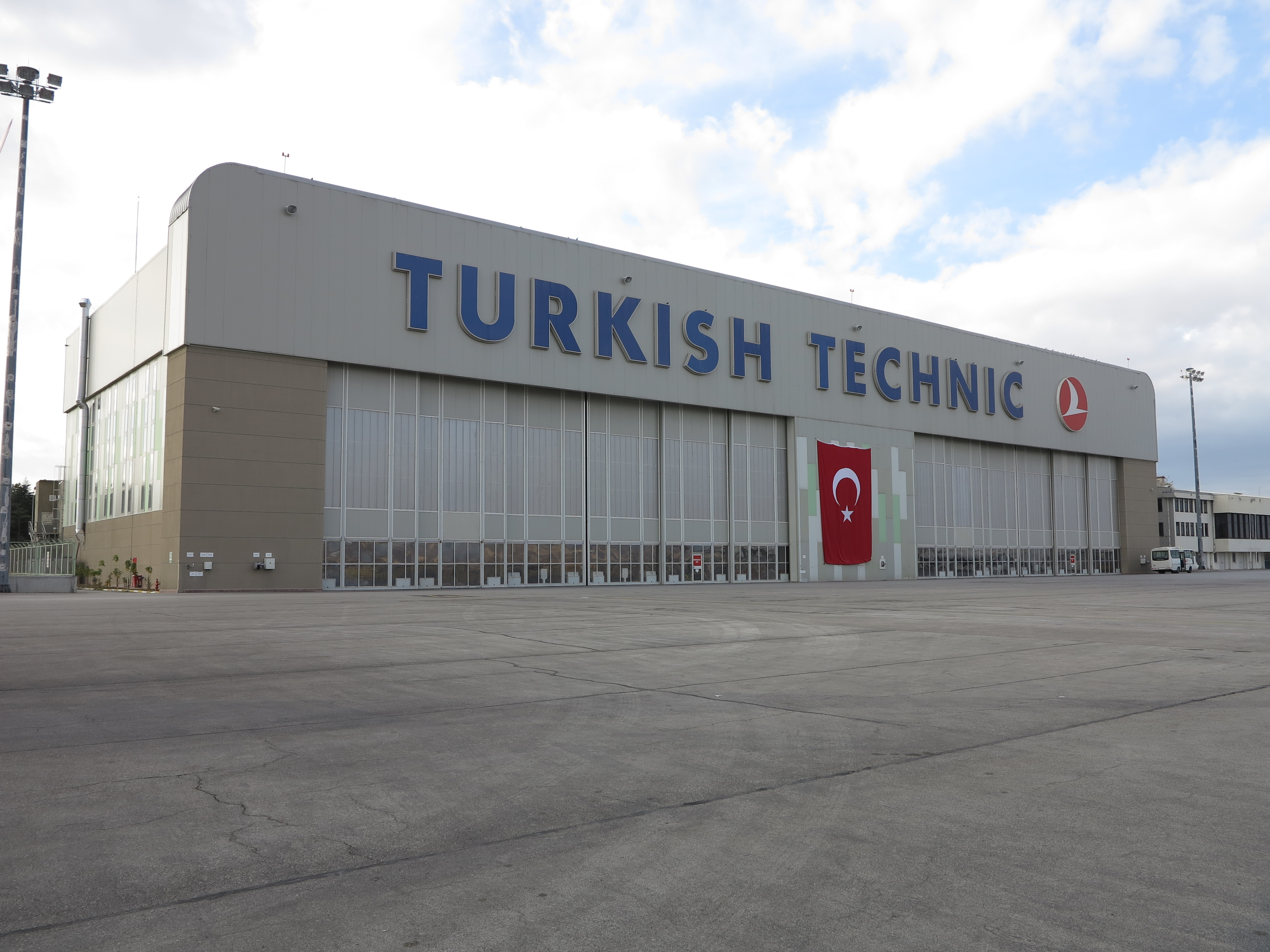
- Turkish Technic Hangar at Esenboğa International Airport
- Type: Anonim Şirket
- Industry: Aircraft maintenance
- Predecessor: Turkish Airlines Aviation Maintenance Division (founded in 1957)
- Founded: May 23, 2006; 20 years ago in Istanbul, Turkey
- Headquarters: Istanbul, Turkey
- Area served: Worldwide
- Number of employees: 11,502 (2023)
- Parent: Turkish Airlines
- Website: www.turkishtechnic.com

Turkish Technic (Turkish Airlines Maintenance Center) is the wholly-owned subsidiary and maintenance, repair and overhaul (MRO) center of Turkish Airlines.

The company operates at five locations in Turkey, namely Atatürk Airport (ISL), Istanbul Airport (IST) and Sabiha Gökçen International Airport (SAW) in Istanbul and Ankara Esenboğa Airport (ESB) in Ankara.

== History ==
Turkish Technic was incorporated in 2006. It operates in three hangars for narrowbody and widebody airplanes and a VIP & light airplanes hangar in IST, in a total enclosed area of 130,000 m^{2} with a workforce of 3,000 employees. Approximately 1,800 of these are technicians and almost 1,300 of these technicians are licensed (LAE - Licensed Aircraft Engineers). The newly built facilities in SAW encompass a hangar for 11 single-aisle aircraft and a separate hangar for three long-haul airframes. The complex is a total enclosed area of 380,000 m^{2} with more than 3,100 employees. A separate narrowbody hangar exists in Esenboğa International Airport (ESB), Ankara.

Turkish Technic is a member of IATP (International Airlines Technical Pool), ELMO (European Line Maintenance Organization), and Airbus MRO Network. Line maintenance stations exist at 24 domestic and 30 international airports.

== Turkish Technic's capabilities ==
Turkish Technic performs aircraft base and line maintenance, engine and APU maintenance and component maintenance services for the types listed below. Most engine work has moved to Turkish Engine Center at SAW, on the Asian/Anatolian side of Istanbul.

Aircraft base and line maintenance capabilities
Aircraft manufacturer	Aircraft type	Base maintenance	Line maintenance
Airbus	Airbus A300-B2/B4/C4/F4 Series	X	X
	Airbus A300-600	X	X
	Airbus A310-200/300	X	X
	Airbus A320 Family	X	X
	Airbus A330 Series	X	X
	Airbus A340-200	X	X
	Airbus A340-300	X	X
Boeing	Boeing 707-120/-320		X
	Boeing 727-200	X	X
	Boeing 737-300/-400/-500	X	X
	Boeing 737-600/-700/-800/-900	X	X
	Boeing 747-400		X
	Boeing 757-200	X	X
	Boeing 767-200/-300	X	X
	Boeing 777-200/-300	X	X
Gulfstream	GIV Series	X	X
	G450	X	X
	G550	X	X

Engine maintenance capabilities
Engine manufacturer	Engine type
CFMI	CFM56-3C
	CFM56-5C
	CFM56-7B
GE	CF6-80 Series
	GE90
IAE	V2500

APU maintenance capabilities
APU manufacturer	APU type
Honeywell	GTCP131-9B
UTC Aerospace Systems (formerly Hamilton Sundstrand)	APS3200

Component maintenance capabilities:

- Airbus A300-B2/B4/C4/F4 series
- Airbus A300-600
- Airbus A310-200/-300
- Airbus A320 family
- Airbus A340-200/-300
- Boeing 727-200
- Boeing 737-300/-400/-500
- Boeing 737-600/-700/-800/-900

Specialized services:

- NDT - Non-destructive testing (Level 2) - Ultrasonic testing, magnetic particle testing, Eddy current testing, liquid penetrant testing, radiographic X-ray testing in accordance with EN 4179 and NAS 410
- Aeropartners of Boeing certified winglet modification center for B737 Next Generation Aircraft
- Complete stripping & aircraft painting
- Cabin interior refurbishment
- SSIP & CPCP Programmes and structural modifications
- Avionic modifications such as TCAS, RVSM, EGPWS
- Plasma spraying, welding, electro-plating, machining
