= Blue Sky =

Bluesky is a social media platform, based on a distributed networking protocol.

Blue Sky, BlueSky or Bluesky may also refer to:

== Business ==
- Blue Sky Airlines, an airline in Armenia
- Blue Sky Aviation Services, a domestic airline in Kenya
- Blue Sky Network, a US-based aviation equipment manufacturer
- Blue Sky Beverage Company, a soft drink manufacturer
- Blue sky law, state laws in the United States that regulate the offering and sale of securities

== Art, entertainment, and media ==
=== Animation and gaming ===
- Blue Sky Studios, US computer animation company
- BlueSky Software, US video game company
- Looking Glass Studios, a computer game developer originally known as Blue Sky Productions

=== Film and television ===
- Blue Sky (1955 film), a Swedish comedy film
- Blue Sky (1994 film), a film starring Jessica Lange and Tommy Lee Jones
- Blue Sky (TV channel), a Greek regional television station
- Blue Sky, blue methamphetamine in the American TV series Breaking Bad, 2008
- Blue Sky programming, USA Network's "optimistic" television shows during 2005-2016

=== Music ===
- Blue Sky Records, a record label started by manager Steve Paul
- Blue Sky (Jinny Ng album), 2012
- Blue Sky (Bottle Rockets album), 2003

==== Songs ====
- "Blue Sky" (song), a song by The Allman Brothers Band
- "Blue Sky", a song by rapper Common, from the album The Dreamer/The Believer
- "Blue Sky", a song by Patti Griffin, from the album Flaming Red
- "Blue Sky", a song by Emily West
- "Mr. Blue Sky", a song by ELO
- "The Blue Sky", a song by a-ha, from the album Hunting High and Low

=== Other art, entertainment, and media ===
- Blue Sky (manga), a 2007 Japanese manga
- Blue sky memo, a document authored by the Central Intelligence Agency (CIA)

== Places ==
- Blue Sky, Colorado, U.S.
- Bluesky, Alberta, Canada
- Mount Blue Sky, a mountain in Colorado, U.S. formerly called Mount Evans

== Science ==
- Blue skies research (also called blue sky science), scientific research in domains where "real-world" applications are not immediately apparent
- Bluesky Formation, a stratigraphic unit of Lower Cretaceous age in the Western Canada Sedimentary Basin
- Diffuse sky radiation, solar radiation reaching the Earth's surface after Rayleigh scattering
- Rayleigh scattering, which causes the sky to appear blue.

== Other uses ==
- BlueSky Charter School, an online school for Minnesota citizens
- Blue Sky, a rainbow code for the Fairey Fireflash air-to-air missile
- Blue Sky navigation pod, an airborne navigational/attack pod
- Blue Sky (artist) (born 1938), American painter and sculptor formerly known as Warren Edward Johnson
- Blue Sky Solar Racing, a solar car racing team based at the University of Toronto

== See also ==
- Blue Skies (disambiguation)
- Black sky (disambiguation)
- Big Sky (disambiguation)
- Sky blue
- Sky Blue (disambiguation)
- Blue Cloud (disambiguation)
- Blue smoke (disambiguation)
