= Blue Skies =

Blue Skies may refer to:

== Film and television ==
- Blue Skies (1929 film), an American drama film
- Blue Skies (1946 film), a musical film starring Bing Crosby and Fred Astaire
- Blue Skies (2002 film), a Canadian short drama film directed by Ann Marie Fleming
- Blue Skies (1994 TV series), a sitcom starring Corey Parker and Matt Roth
- Blue Skies (1988 TV series), an American drama series

== Albums ==
- Blue Skies (Decca album), a 1946 album by Bing Crosby and Fred Astaire
- Blue Skies (Bing Crosby album) (1962), volume 10 of the Bing's Hollywood collection
- Blue Skies (Frank Ifield album), 1964
- Blue Skies (Stan Getz album), 1995
- Blue Skies (Cassandra Wilson album), 1988
- Blue Skies (Bryan Duncan album), 1996
- Blue Skies (Diana DeGarmo album), 2004
- Blue Skies (Virginians album), 2008
- Blue Skies (Seth MacFarlane album), 2022
- Blue Skies (Dehd album), 2022

== Songs ==
- "Blue Skies" (Irving Berlin song), 1926
- "Blue Skies" (BT song), 1996
- "Blue Skies" (Noah and the Whale song), 2009
- "Blue Skies" (Jamiroquai song), 2010
- "Blue Skies", by A-ha from the album Hunting High and Low
- "Blue Skies", by Blackpool Lights from the album This Town's Disaster
- "Blue Skies", by Bobby Vinton from the album Blue on Blue
- "Blue Skies", by Carly Rae Jepsen from the album Day and Night
- "Blue Skies", by Lenka from the album The Bright Side
- "Blue Skies", by Tom Waits from the album The Early Years Vol. 2

== Other uses ==
- Blue skies research
- Blue Skies, a 2023 novel by T. C. Boyle

== See also ==
- Big Sky (disambiguation)
- Blue Sky (disambiguation)
- Sky Blues (disambiguation)
- Sky blue
