= Sky Blu =

Sky Blu may refer to:

- Sky Blu (Antarctica), a British Antarctic Survey forward operating station in Antarctica
- Sky Blu (rapper) (born 1986), American rapper

== See also ==
- Skye Blue (born 1999), American wrestler
- Sky Blue (disambiguation)
