= Black sky =

Black sky may refer to:

- night sky
- outer space
- Black Sky (Spanish: Cielo negro), a 1951 Spanish drama film
- Black Sky: The Race For Space (2004), a documentary about the Ansari X-Prize and SpaceShipOne
- BlackSky Technology Inc., a division of Spaceflight Industries Inc. providing geospatial intelligence services
- Black Sky Aerospace, an Australian private aerospace company, founded in 2018
- "Black Sky", a 1992 song by Shakespears Sister from the album Hormonally Yours

== See also ==
- The Sky So Big and Black (2002 novel), science fiction novel by John Barnes
- Big Black Sky (2008 album) by Canadian rock band Prism
- Blackened Sky (2004 album), debut studio album by Scottish rock band Biffy Clyro
- Total eclipse, when the sky turns black
- Overcast, or grey sky; heavy overcast from clouds, smoke, dust or sand, can turn the sky black
- Blue Sky (disambiguation)
- Big Sky (disambiguation)
- Black (disambiguation)
- Sky (disambiguation)
