= Flower of Devotion =

Studio album by Dehd
- Released: July 21, 2020
- Length: 38:24
- Label: Fire Talk
- Producer: Dave Vettraino

Dehd chronology
Water (2019)	Flower of Devotion (2020)	Blue Skies (2022)

Singles from Flower of Devotion
- 1. "Letter" Released: October 10, 2019; 2. "Loner" Released: May 11, 2020; 3. "Flood" Released: June 17, 2020; 4. "Month" Released: July 8, 2020

Flower of Devotion is the third studio album by American indie rock band Dehd. The album was released on July 21, 2020, through Fire Talk.

== Critical reception ==
Professional ratings
Aggregate scores
Source	Rating
Metacritic	78/100
Review scores
Source	Rating
AllMusic	4/5 stars
Beats per Minute	75%
The Line of Best Fit	7/10
Paste	7.8/10
Pitchfork	8.3/10
Q	3/5 stars
Under the Radar	8/10

Critical reception to Flower of Devotion was largely favorable, with commentators taking note of the album's more refined production. Scott Russell of Paste noted it "Dehd's best album to date, a significant upgrade on their sound that finds their Windy City DIY scene-honed amalgam of surf rock, shoegaze and dream pop at its most melodic and expressive." Pitchfork's Steven Arroyo designated it with the publication's "Best New Music" tag, noting that "the Chicago DIY trio sound newly airy and lush, but no less direct and sincere. Their confidence in their concision is the best part."

== Accolades ==
=== Year-end lists ===
Critics' rankings for Flower of Devotion
Publication	Accolade	Rank	Ref.
Paste	The 50 Best Albums of 2020	48	
Pitchfork	The 50 Best Albums of 2020	39	
Pitchfork	The 35 Best Rock Albums of 2020	—	

== Track listing ==
No.	Title	Length
1.	"Desire"	3:14
2.	"Loner"	3:12
3.	"Haha"	2:11
4.	"Drip Drop"	2:43
5.	"Month"	3:03
6.	"Disappear"	2:23
7.	"Flood"	2:57
8.	"Letter"	3:15
9.	"Nobody"	2:47
10.	"No Time"	3:03
11.	"Moonlight"	3:24
12.	"Apart"	2:26
13.	"Flying"	3:46
Total length:		38:24
