= Accessory (musician) =

- Born: Jason Balla
- Origin: Chicago, Illinois
- Genres: Indie rock
- Years active: 2018–present
- Label: Fire Talk Records
- Member of: Dehd, NE-HI
- Website: acx.info/accessory/

Accessory is the stage name of American indie rock musician Jason Balla, who is a member of the bands Dehd and NE-HI.

== History ==
Balla began recording music under the name Accessory in 2018 with the release of a tape titled "Blue Tape". In 2020, Balla released a new song as Accessory called "Eyes for Berlin". In 2023, Balla released another song as Accessory titled "Wherever You Are Tonight". In 2025, Balla released the song "Chain Link". In 2026, Balla released his debut album under the Accessory moniker titled "Dust". Balla cites Astrid Sonne, Miles Davis and his mother's piano as influences for the album.

== Discography ==
Studio albums

- Dust (2026, Fire Talk Records)

EPs

- Blue Tape (2018, Fire Talk Records)
