= Donald Braben =

British physicist

Donald W. Braben
- Born: 29 May 1935; Liverpool, England
- Died: 23 February 2025 (aged 89)
- Citizenship: British
- Education: University of Liverpool
- Known for: Blue skies research
- Scientific career
- Fields: Physics
- Workplaces: University College London; University of Liverpool
- Thesis: Energy levels of Na 23 (1962)
- Website: www.ucl.ac.uk/planetary-sciences/people/dwbra04

Donald W. Braben was a British author and Honorary Professor in the Office of the Vice-Provost (Research), University College London.

== Life ==
Braben was educated at the University of Liverpool where he was awarded a PhD in 1962 for work on Isotopes of sodium. He gained a pilot licence with the University Air Squadron, which he maintained throughout his life.

At university he married Shirley, a fellow PhD; they later had three children. Braben died in 2025, aged 89.

== Research ==
Braben was a well-known critic of peer review and an advocate of blue skies research, scientific freedom and the culture of science. Braben was the author of To Be a Scientist: The Spirit of Adventure in Science and Technology, (OUP 1994), Pioneering Research: A Risk Worth Taking (Wiley 2004) Scientific Freedom: The Elixir of Civilization (Wiley 2008), and Promoting the Planck Club: How defiant youth, irreverent researchers and liberated universities can foster prosperity indefinitely (Wiley 2014). Scientific Freedom: The Elixir of Civilisation was republished by Stripe Press in 2020 with a new Introduction.

Braben tried to persuade universities to recreate the success he had with the BP-sponsored Venture Research Unit (1980–90), and later at University College London from 2009. Venture Research is research that has a good chance of radically changing the way we think in an important field and is selected in face-to-face discussion.
