= Mahan Air =

Iranian airline

Mahan Air هواپیمایی ماهان

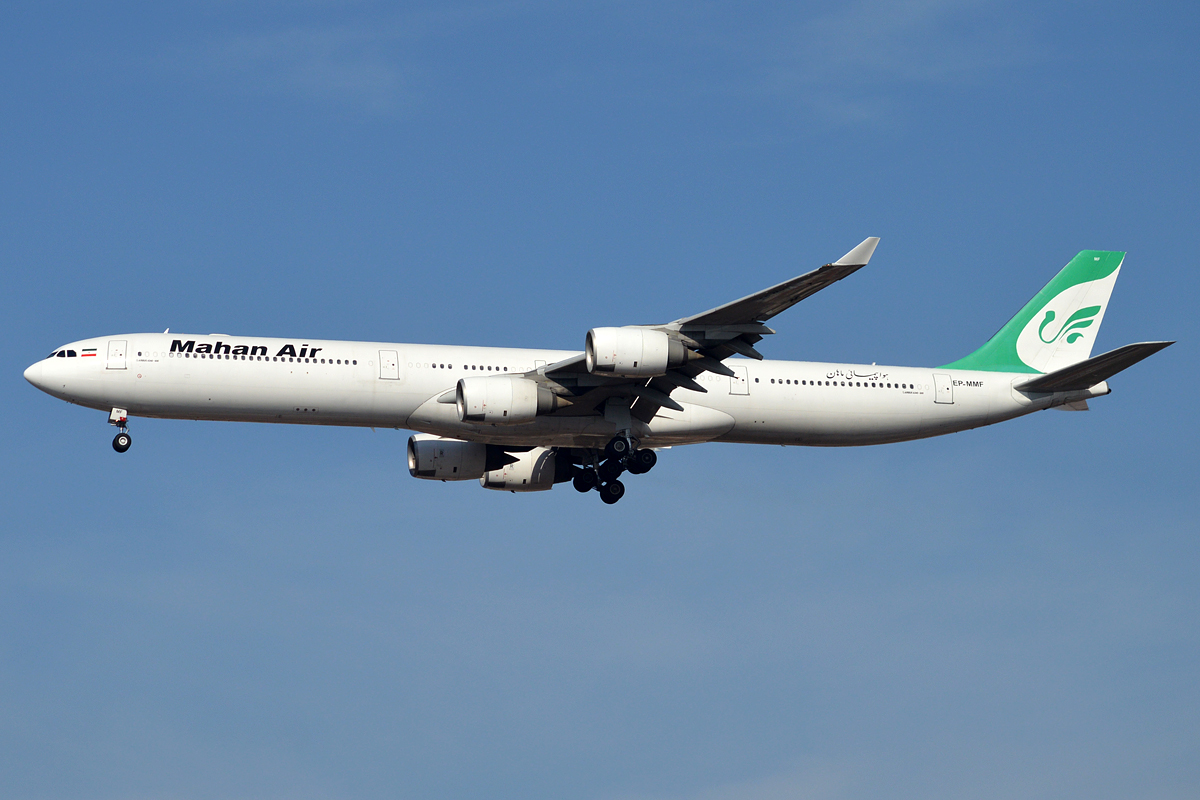
- A Mahan Air Airbus A340-600
| IATA | ICAO | Call sign |
|---|---|---|
| W5 | IRM | MAHAN AIR |
- Founded: 1991; 35 years ago
- Commenced operations: June 1992; 34 years ago
- Hubs: Tehran–Mehrabad; Tehran–Imam Khomeini
- Focus cities: Kerman; Mashhad
- Frequent-flyer program: Mahan and Miles
- Fleet size: 41
- Destinations: 48
- Parent company: Mol-Al-Movahedin Institute
- Headquarters: Sadeghiyeh, Tehran, Iran
- Key people: Hamid Arabnejad, chairman & CEO
- Employees: 4,000 (2025)
- Website: www.mahanair.co.ir/en

Mahan Airlines, operating under the name Mahan Air (Persian: هواپیمایی ماهان, romanized: Havâpeymâyi-ye Mâhân), is a privately owned Iranian airline based in Tehran, Iran. It operates scheduled domestic services and international flights to the Far East, Middle East, Central Asia, South Asia, Southeast Asia, East Asia and Europe. Its main home bases are Imam Khomeini International Airport and Mehrabad International Airport.

Mahan Airlines was banned between 2019 and 2020 from Germany, France, Italy and Spain due to its involvement with the Maduro government in Venezuela and the Assad regime in Syria. In 2024 the airline was sanctioned by the European Union for transporting weaponry to Russia during the Russo-Ukrainian War. It was also suspected of transferring money to Hezbollah in Lebanon. The airline is also sanctioned by the United States.

== History ==
=== Early developments ===
Mahan Air was established in 1991 as a Full-Service Carrier (FSC) and began operations in June 1992 as Iran's first private airline. The name of Mahan is taken from the city of Mahan in Kerman Province. The airline is wholly owned by the Mol-Al-Movahedin Charity Institute.

Three Airbus A300B4 passenger aircraft were acquired in 1999, and A310s and A320s joined the fleet in 2002. According to the British High Court, three Boeing 747-400s were unlawfully taken by Mahan Air from their real owner, Blue Sky Airlines, in 2008, using forged bills of sale. When ordered to bring the aircraft back to Europe, Mahan claimed it could not do so because it was being investigated by the Iranian authorities for fraud, and the aircraft had to be kept in Iran.

Since 2006 Boeing 747-400s, Airbus A300-600s, Avro RJ-100s, and Airbus A340-600s were gradually acquired.

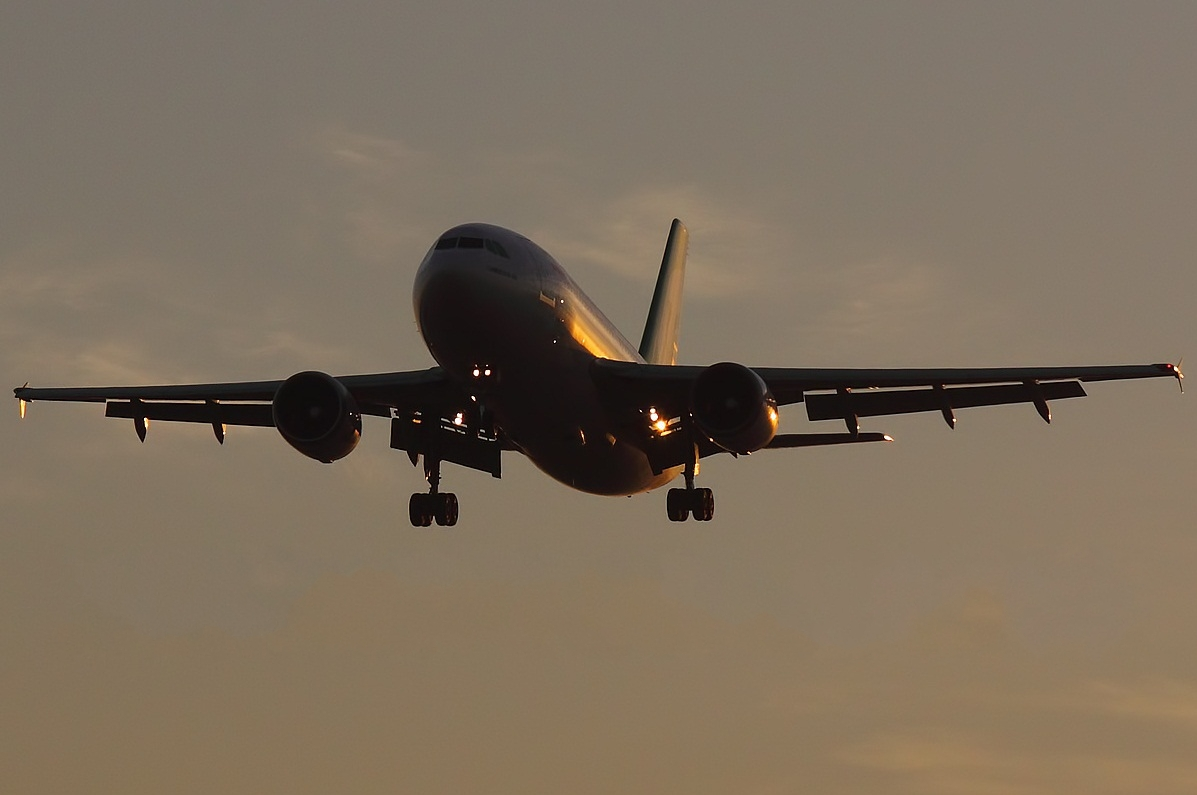
Mahan Air Airbus A310

The airline carried 5.4 million passengers in 2015 with an average load factor of 77%. In mid-2015, it had a fleet of 60 aircraft. It operates scheduled passenger services to international destinations in Europe, the Far East,and the Middle East. Mahan Air has a domestic route network.

Following the implementation of the Iran Nuclear Deal in 2015, the company signed deals with Boeing, Airbus, and other Western companies to buy over 100 planes. However following Donald Trump's withdrawal from the nuclear deal in 2018, the United States revoked Mahan Air's trade licenses.

The airline is affiliated with the Iranian Quds Force of the Iranian Revolutionary Guard, according to the U.S. Department of Justice and the U.S. Bureau of Industry and Security. Mahan Air was sanctioned by the United States Department of the Treasury in 2011; in 2020, two United Arab Emirates based companies were also sanctioned for supplying parts and services to Mahan Air.

=== Developments since 2011 ===
On 12 December 2011, the U.S. Department of Treasury announced the designation of Mahan Air as a material and transportation supporter of terrorism, "for providing financial, material and technological support to the Islamic Revolutionary Guard Corps-Quds Force (IRGC-QF). Based in Tehran, Mahan Air provides transportation, funds transfers, and personnel travel services to the IRGC-QF."

On 6 April 2016, Mahan Air was banned from flying over Saudi Arabian airspace.

In 2016, besides Germany and Denmark, Mahan Air started service to Milan and Athens, and to Barcelona the following year. It operated up to 15 weekly flights to China until late 2018.

During the Venezuelan presidential crisis, Mahan Air launched their direct Caracas-Tehran route in April 2019. In January 2019, the German government banned Mahan Air from landing in Germany, where it had formerly served Munich Airport and Düsseldorf Airport, citing Mahan's involvement in Syria and security concerns. France imposed the same ban on 25 March 2019, and Mahan Air was forced to cancel its 4-weekly service to Paris. On 1 November 2019, the Italian government also announced that it would ban Mahan Air flights to the country from 15 December 2019. The move came after United States Secretary of State Mike Pompeo's visit to Rome, during which he urged Italian officials to stop allowing Iranian airlines to use Italy's airspace. The remaining destinations within the European Union had been Barcelona and seasonally also Athens and Varna since then. However, in April 2020, the airline lost its traffic rights to Spain as well.

According to the BBC, after Iran officially suspended all flights to and from China in 2020, Mahan Air continued flying to China and elsewhere in February and March of that year. The data show that although six flights were used for aid, four others were used to evacuate Iranian citizens from China, and there were a total of 157 additional flights with China from 6 February 2020 to 31 March 2020. Mahan Air was widely blamed for spreading the Covid-19 virus in Iran.

In October 2024, the European Union imposed sanctions on Mahan Air for supplying missiles and drones to Russia for the war in Ukraine.

Throughout the Gaza war, Mahan Air was suspected to have facilitated the transfer of money from Iran to the Iranian proxy Hezbollah in Lebanon, culminating in at least one search by Lebanese authorities of a Mahan Air flight in Beirut on 2 January 2025.

In July 2025, Mahan Air acquired five Boeing 777-200ER aircraft, circumventing international sanctions by using a convoluted, year-long process involving front companies, a temporary registration under a Malagasy start-up called UDAAN Aviation, and off-radar ferry flights from Cambodia to Iran. The aircraft, previously with Singapore Airlines and its subsidiary NokScoot, are believed to be for Mahan Air, an Iranian carrier already under U.S. sanctions. UDAAN Aviation is allegedly linked to the Sodiat conglomerate, owned by Mamy Ravatomanga, according to the Malagasy press.

In 2026, Mahan Air expanded its fleet with five Boeing 777s previously operated by Saudia. These aircraft, which had been sold in 2023, were procured through a network of front companies, representing the airline's second acquisition of the 777 type.

== Corporate affairs ==
Mahan Air is headquartered in Tehran. Its current slogan is "The Spirit of Excellence." Mahan Air loyalty program, called the Mahan Club "Mahan & Miles", includes access to lounges and dedicated fast queues.

== Destinations ==
As of October 2023, Mahan Air operated flights to domestic destinations and international destinations in countries across Asia and Europe. Mahan Air served 45 destinations in 10 countries.

== Fleet ==
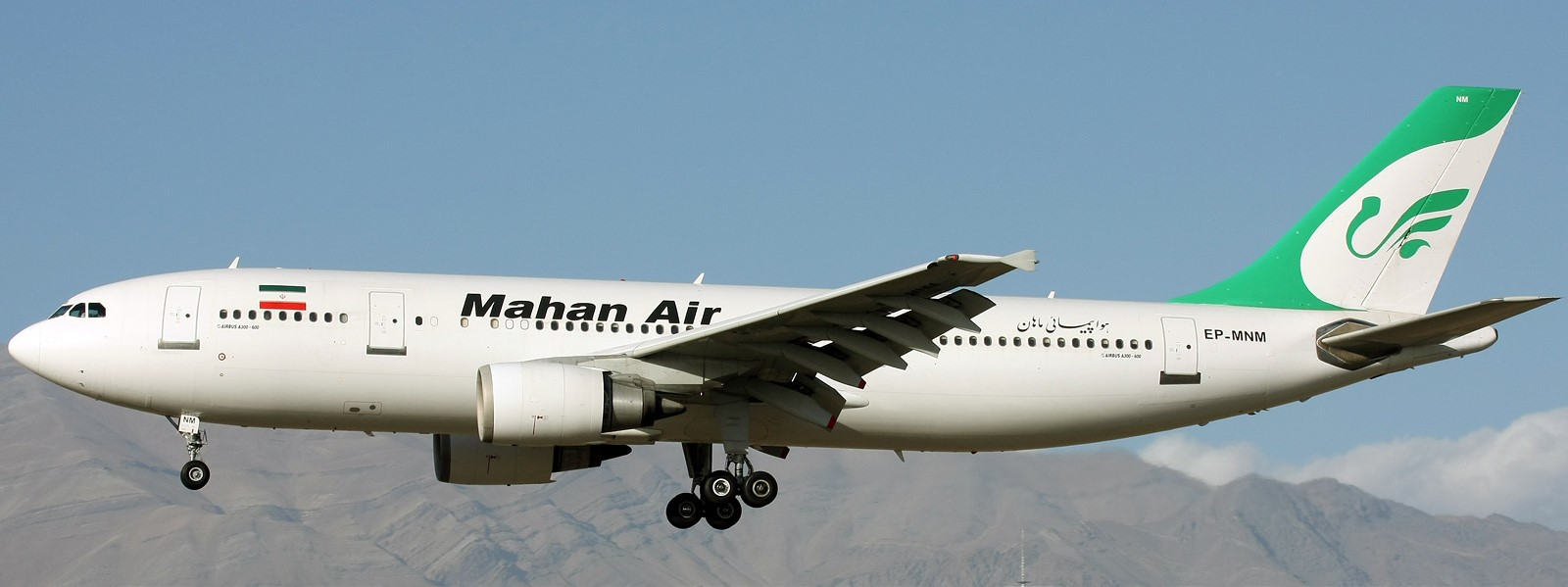
Mahan Air Airbus A300-600R

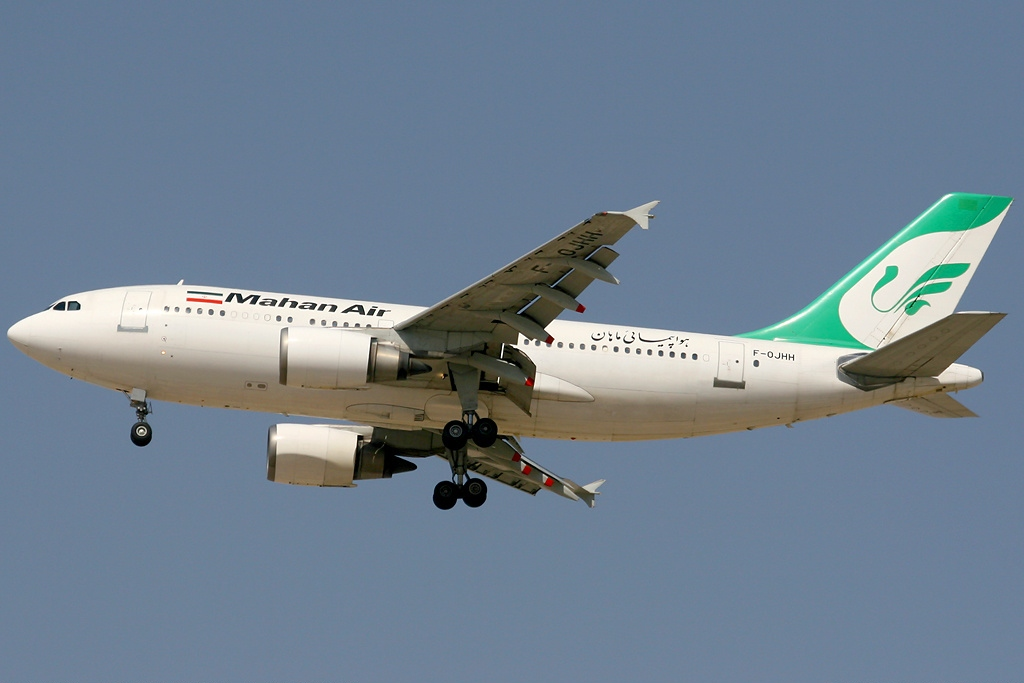
A former Mahan Air Airbus A310-300

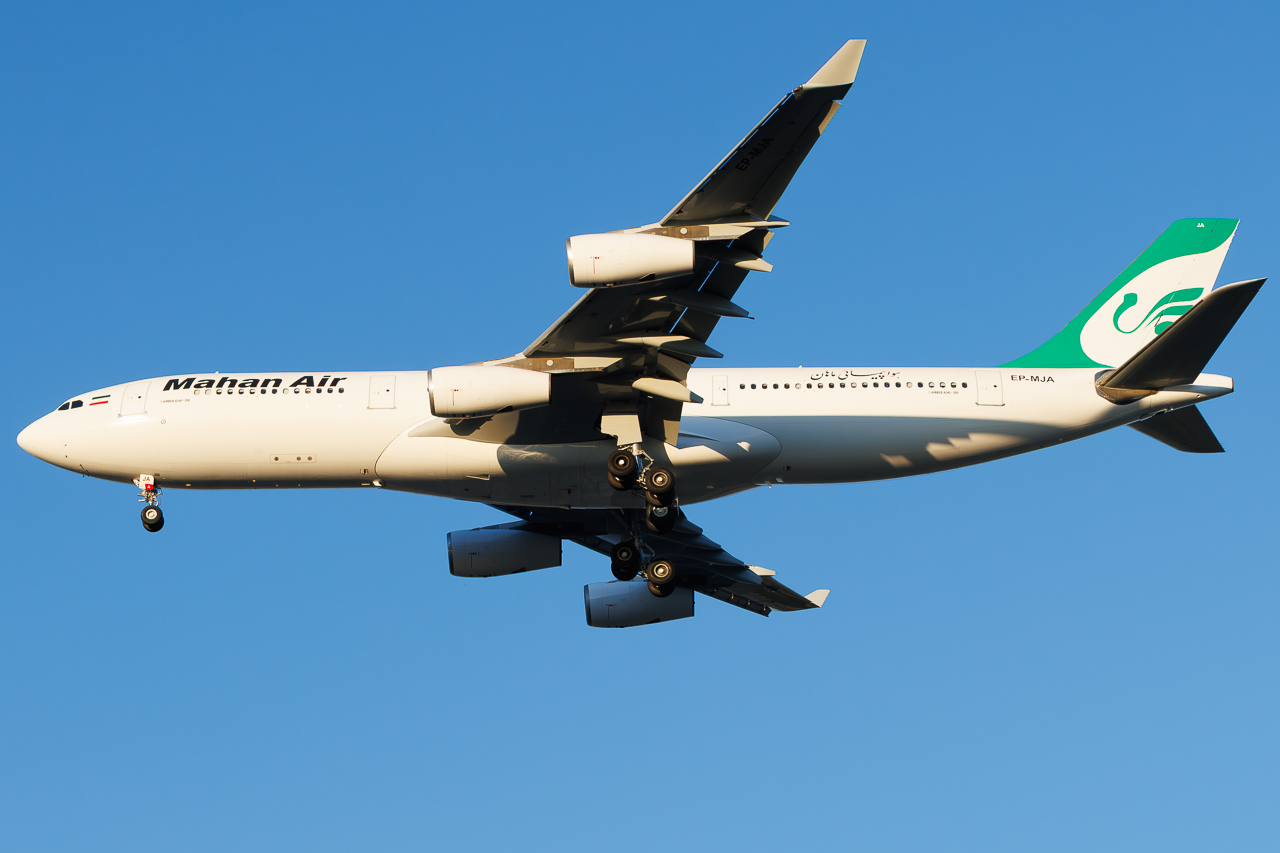
Mahan Air Airbus A340-211

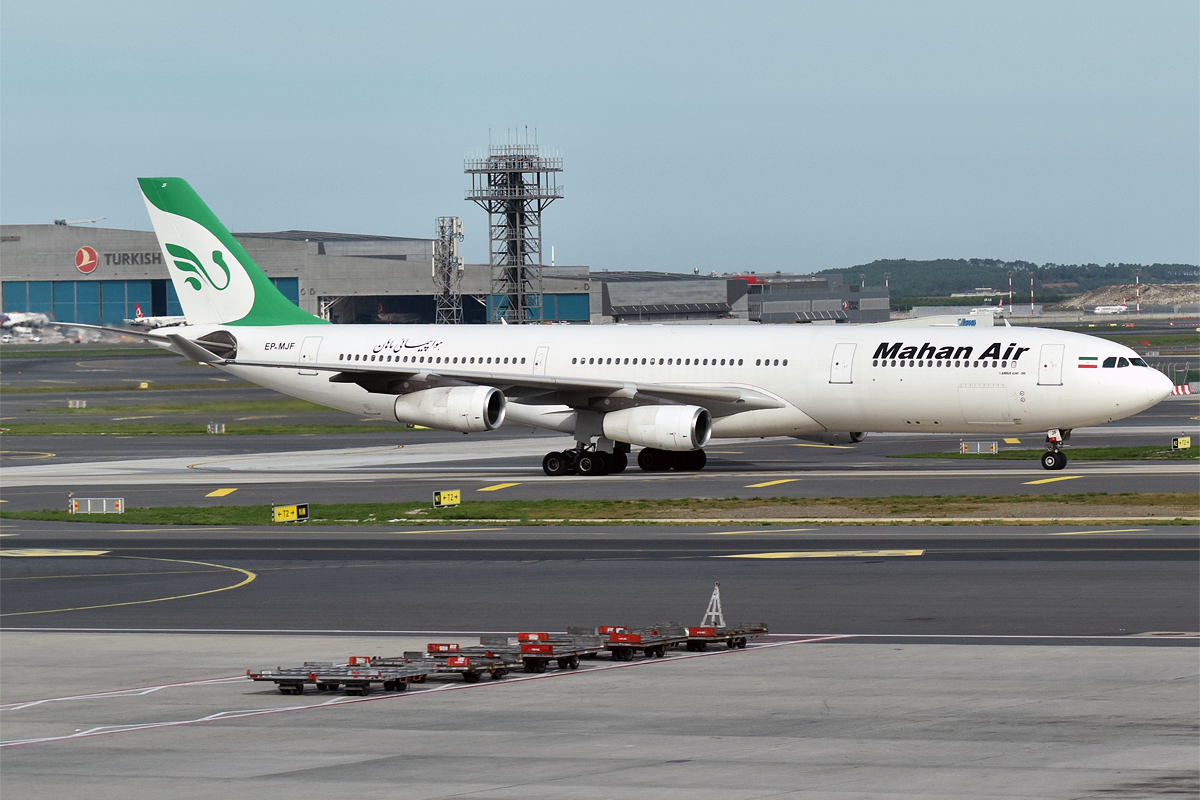
A Mahan Air Airbus A340-300

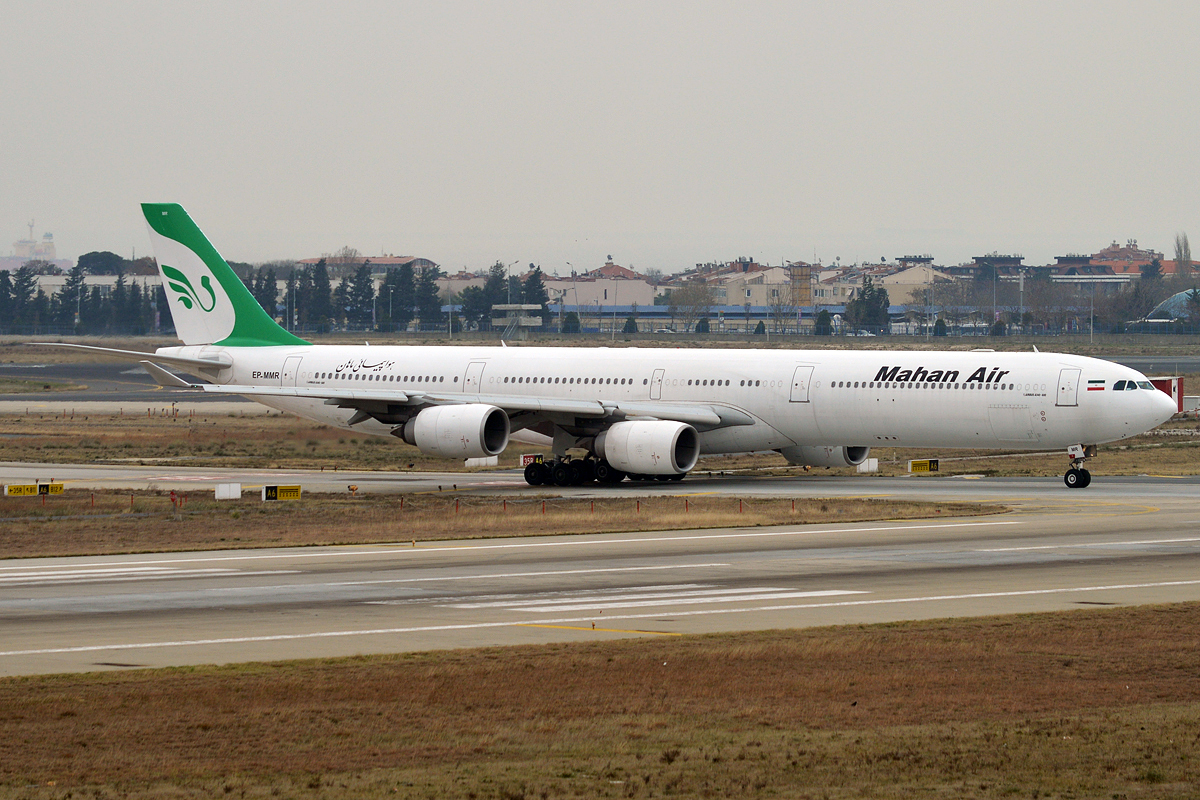
Mahan Air Airbus A340-600

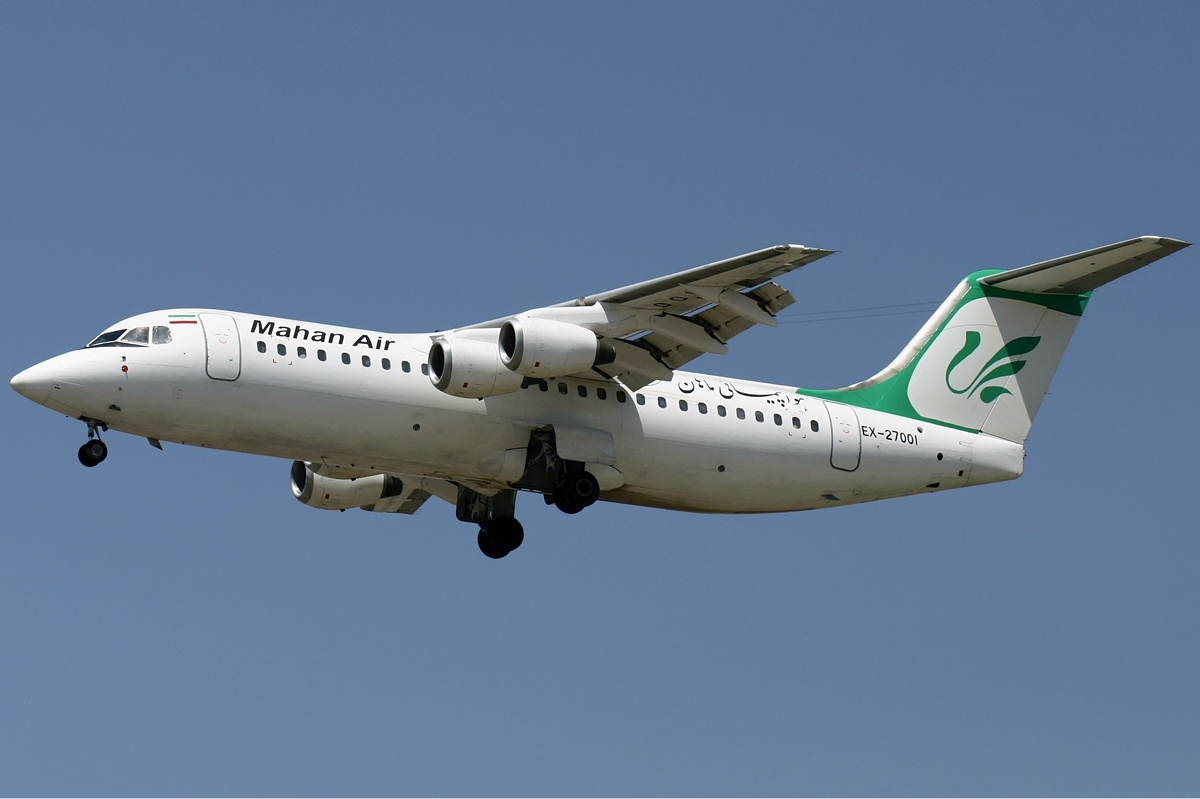
Mahan Air BAe 146-300

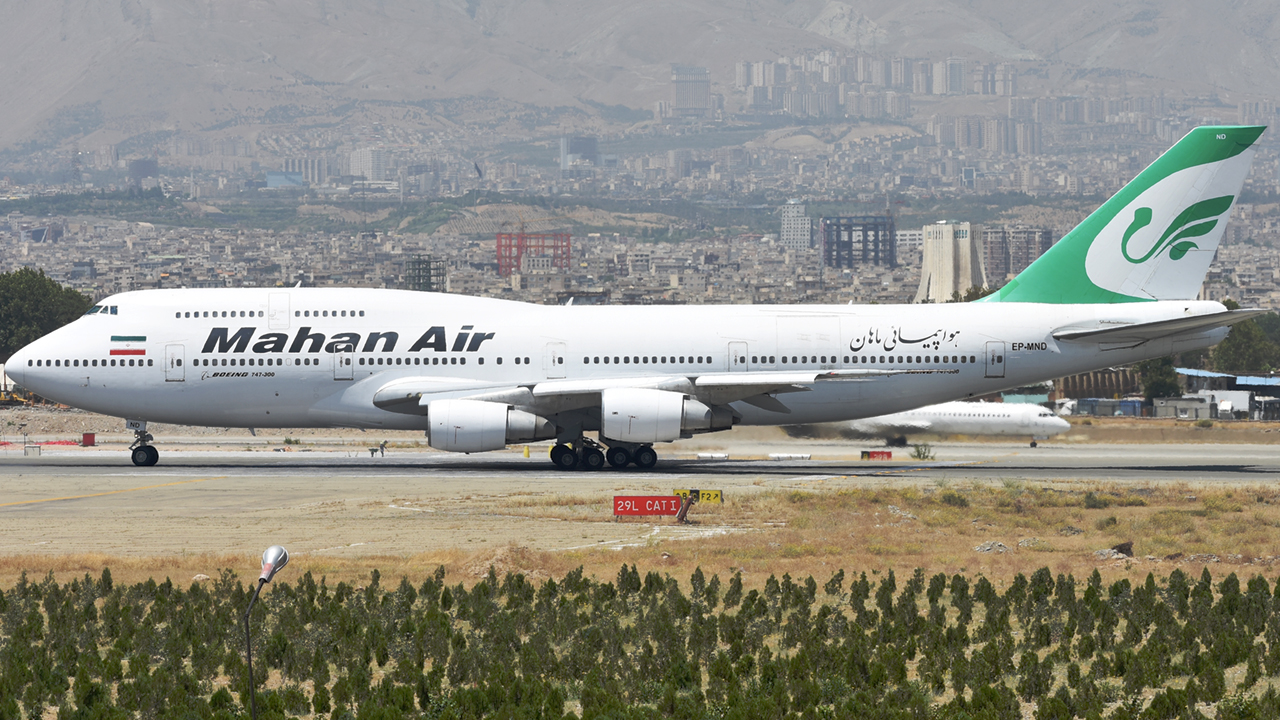
A former Mahan Air Boeing 747-300M at Tehran Mehrabad Airport

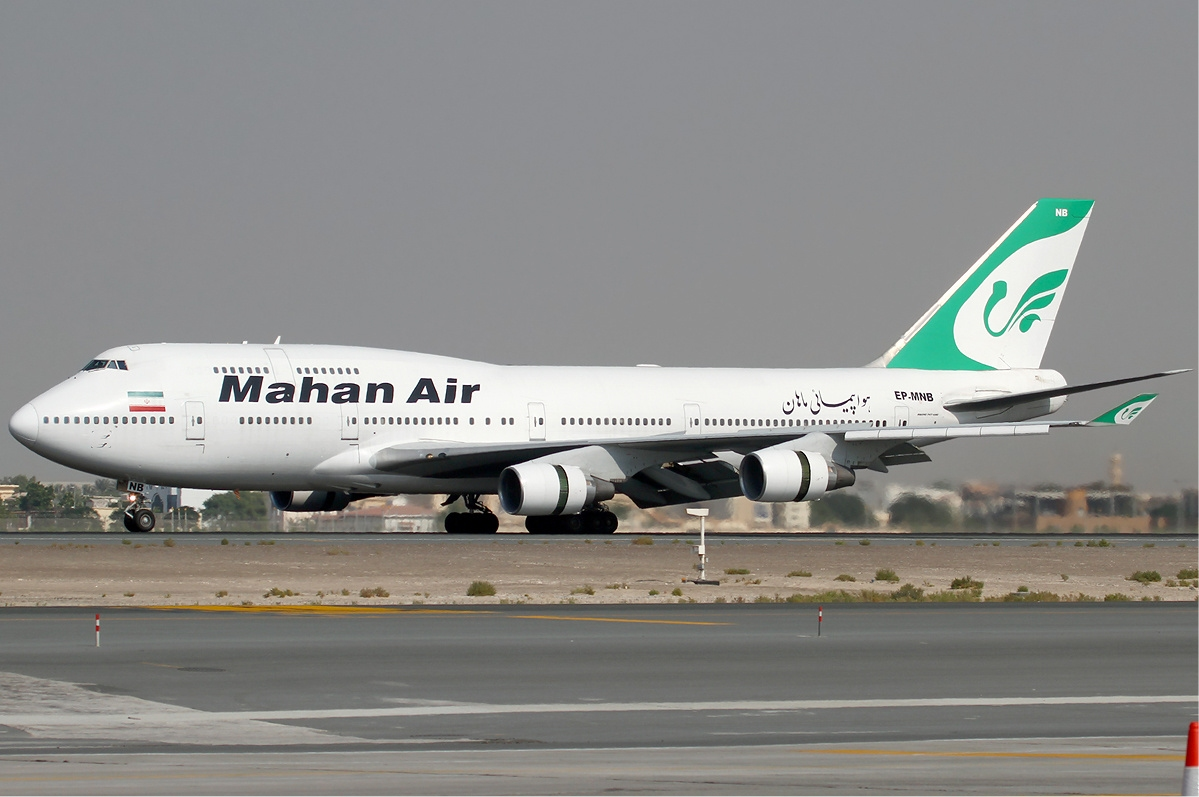
A Mahan Air Boeing 747-400

A Mahan Air Boeing 777-200ER

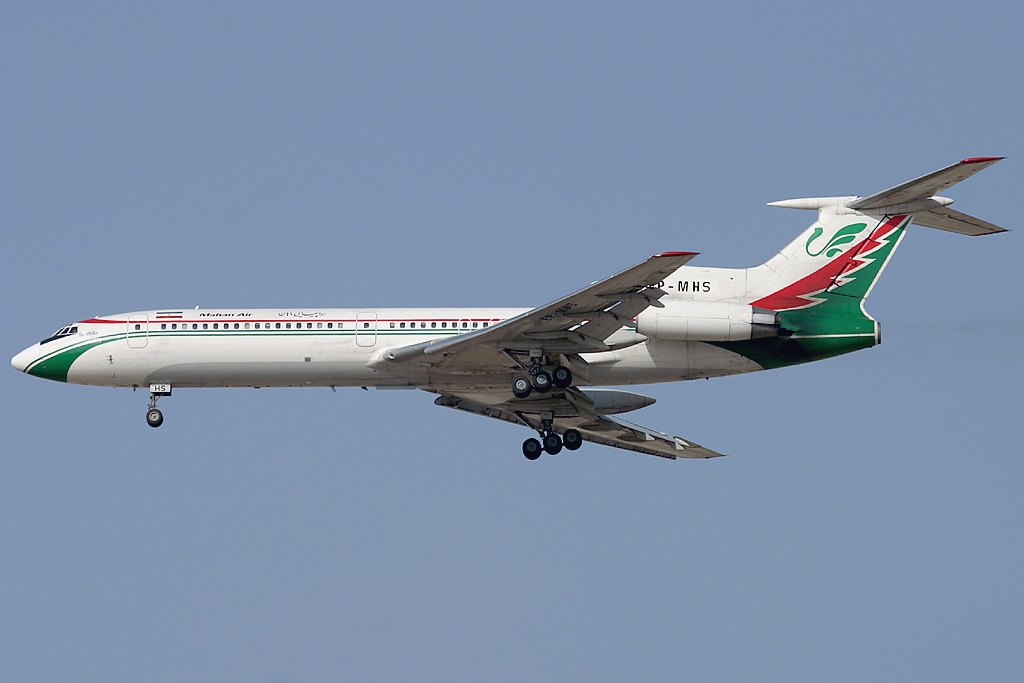
A former Mahan Air Tupolev Tu-154M

=== Current fleet ===
As of July 2026, Mahan Air operates the following aircraft:

Mahan Air fleet
| Aircraft | In service | Orders | Passengers | | | Notes |
| Aircraft | In service | Orders | J | Y | Total | Notes |
|---|---|---|---|---|---|---|
| Airbus A300-600R | 2 | — | 24 | 256 | 280 | |
| Airbus A310-300 | 2 | — | | | | |
| Airbus A340-200 | 1 | — | 30 | 247 | 277 | Acquired in September 2023. |
| Airbus A340-300 | 10 | — | 30 | 269 | 299 | Includes Deli Mike. |
| Airbus A340-600 | 4 | — | 42 | 276 | 318 | 1 damaged beyond repair in airstrikes in March 2026. |
| Boeing 747-400 | 1 | — | 28 | 436 | 460 | |
| Boeing 777-200ER | 2 | — | 24 | 391 | 415 | Acquired in July 2025, previously operated by NokScoot.1 destroyed in airstrikes in March 2026. 5 ex Saudia 777s brought in one year later |
| BAe 146 | 17 | — | — | 100 | 100 | |
| Fokker 50 | 2 | — | — | 50 | 50 | |
| Total | 41 | 0 | | | | |

== Incidents ==
- On 23 February 2006, a Mahan Air Airbus A310 operating a flight from Tehran, Iran, was involved in a serious incident while on approach to Birmingham International Airport. The aircraft descended to the published minimum descent altitude of 740 ft despite still being 11 nm from the runway threshold. At a point 6 nm from the runway, the aircraft had descended to an altitude of 660 ft, which was 164 ft above ground level. Having noticed the descent profile, Birmingham air traffic control issued an immediate climb instruction to the aircraft, however, the crew had already commenced a missed approach, having received a GPWS alert. The aircraft was radar-vectored for a second approach, during which the flight crew again initiated an early descent. On this occasion, the radar controller instructed the crew to maintain their altitude, and the crew completed the approach to a safe landing. The accident investigation determined that the primary cause was the use of the incorrect DME for the approach, combined with a substantial breakdown in Crew Resource Management. Three safety recommendations were made.
- On 23 September 2013, a Boeing 747-300 registered EP-MNE operating as Flight 5070 from Kerman to Medina aborted takeoff after V_{1} and excursed from the runway. All 443 people survived, and only 13 were injured. The aircraft was repaired and returned to service but would be involved in another accident two years later.
- On 13 June 2014, an Airbus A310 registered EP-MNX was struck by a passenger bus while parked at Tehran-Imam Khomeini International Airport. The aircraft was unoccupied at the time of the incident and was repaired.
- On 15 October 2015, the same aircraft involved in the Flight 5070 incident operating as Flight 1095 from Tehran to Bandar Abbas, experienced an engine failure after taking off from Tehran. The aircraft returned to Tehran and made an emergency landing with no injuries to the 441 people on board reported. The aircraft was almost damaged beyond repair. However, in April 2021, after being in a C-Check and being repaired for over six years, the plane was re-activated.
- On 24 December 2015, Mahan Air Flight 112, an Airbus A310 registered EP-MNP, rolled off the apron at Istanbul while taxiing at Istanbul Atatürk Airport. All 166 people survived, and the aircraft was repaired.
- On 19 June 2016, a British Aerospace BAe-146-300 registered EP-MOF operating as Flight 4525 from Ahvaz to Khark overran the runway after landing at Khark Airport and was substantially damaged. All 89 people on board survived with no injuries, but the aircraft was declared a hull loss.
- On 23 July 2020, it was reported that a Mahan Air Airbus A310-300 registered EP-MNF operating as Flight 1152 from Tehran to Beirut, was escorted by American fighter jets over Syrian airspace. The airplane landed in Beirut with three injuries reported.
- On 3 October 2022, a bomb threat on Mahan Air Flight 81, an Airbus A340, travelling from Tehran to Guangzhou caused the Indian Air Force to scramble fighter jets as the aircraft passed through Indian airspace. The threat was received at Delhi air traffic control from Lahore air traffic control when the aircraft was about 200 km west of Delhi. The flight made three circles as it waited to land in Delhi, but was denied. The flight then offered to land at other Indian airports, but the requests were not taken up. The bomb threat was later called a hoax on receiving information from Tehran and only then was the flight able to reach its destination.
- On 26 December 2022, Mahan Air (W5) Flight 63 from Tehran (IKA) to Dubai International Airport (DXB) made an abrupt diversion to Kish International Airport (KIH), as it was approaching Dubai over the Persian Gulf. The Airbus A340 was reportedly ordered to land by Iranian authorities to prevent the wife and daughter of Ali Daei, Iran's most famous footballer, from leaving the country.
