= Dehd =

American indie rock band

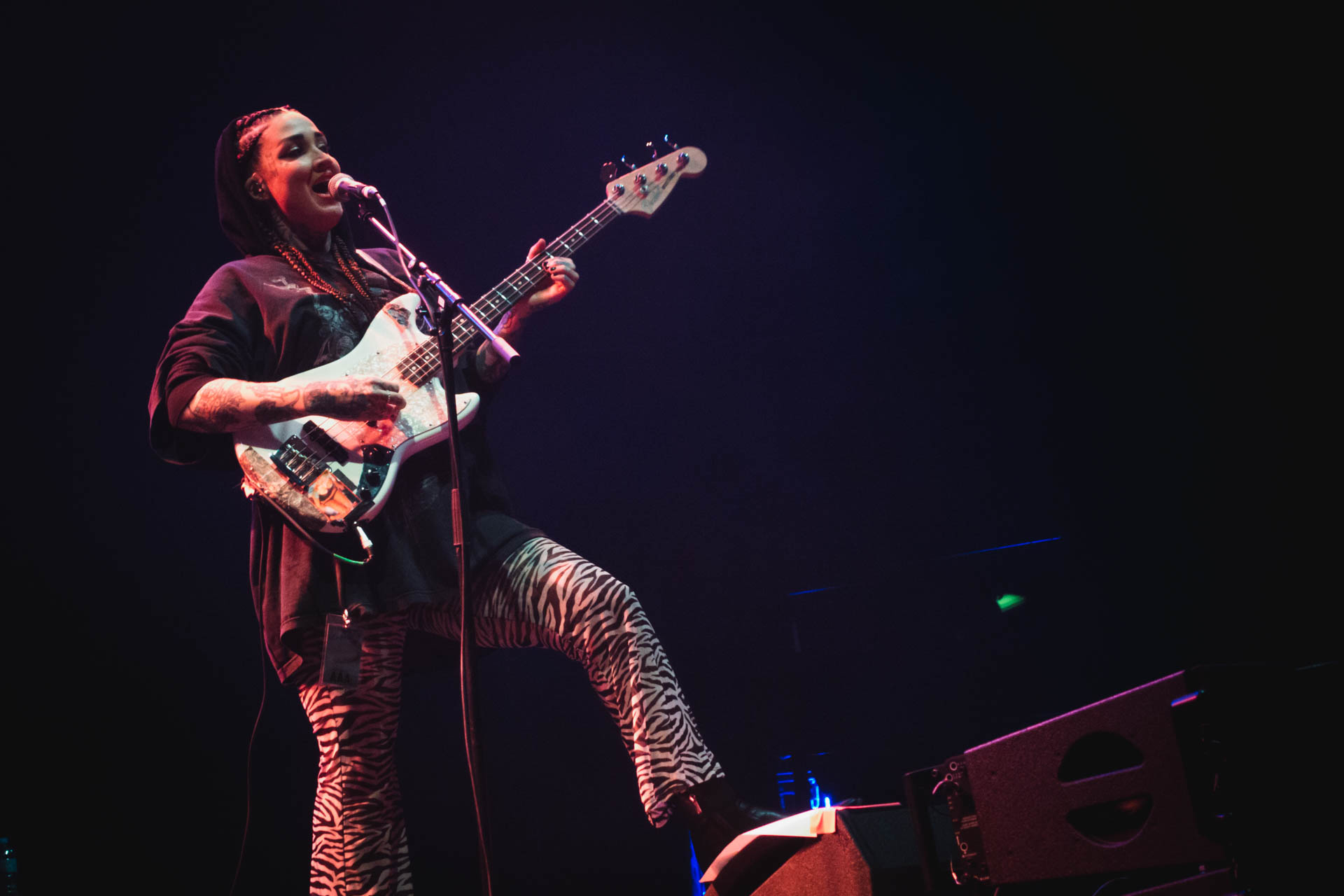
- in London in 2023

Background information
- Origin: Chicago, Illinois, U.S.
- Genres: Indie rock; post-punk; surf rock; garage rock
- Years active: 2015–present
- Labels: Fire Talk; Maximum Pelt; Fat Possum
- Members: Emily Kempf; Jason Balla; Eric McGrady
- Website: dehd.horse

Dehd is an American three-piece indie rock band from Chicago formed in 2015. The band consists of members Emily Kempf (bass guitar, vocals), Jason Balla (guitar, vocals), and Eric McGrady (drums).

== History ==
The band formed in 2015 initially as a side project between Jason Balla of the Dream Eagles and Emily Kempf of Heavy Dreams, under the combined name of Dream Eagles Heavy Dreams, which was quickly abbreviated to Dehd. In 2016, Dehd released a nine track self-titled album, via the label Maximum Pelt. This was followed by a six track EP, Fire of Love in 2017, via Infinity Cat Recordings. During the summer of 2017, the band self-recorded its release with borrowed gear in a room in an old Frank Lloyd Wright warehouse.

Dehd released their second LP Water on Fire Talk Records in May 2019. The track "Wild" from Water was featured in the third episode of season two of The CW series Charmed. Dehd toured the Netherlands, Germany, the United Kingdom, and France in October 2019, in support of fellow Chicago act Twin Peaks.

Flower of Devotion was released in July 2020, having been pushed back from a spring 2020 release date as a result of the COVID-19 pandemic. The album was met with widespread critical acclaim, with Pitchfork granting the release a "best new music" designation. On February 14, 2022, Dehd released a new single titled "Bad Love" on Fat Possum Records.

== Musical style and influences ==
"No Time"
16 second reduced quality sample of "No Time" from the album Flower of Devotion. The sample demonstrates Dehd's idiosyncratic use of vocal yelping and harmony."

Dehd's sound is characterized by reverb-heavy guitar, blunt drumming, and the use of idiosyncratic vocals, which include drawls, call-and response, yelping, and frequent use of counter-melody. Commentators have compared the resulting spareness of the sound to the genre of post-punk, but additional comparisons can be made to wall of sound, surf rock and dream pop.

Jason Balla has cited Cocteau Twins, Broadcast, and Cate Le Bon as influences, while Emily Kempf has referenced the works of James Brown, Roy Orbison, and Dolly Parton as having shaped their musical approach.

== Discography ==
- 2016: Dehd
- 2017: Fire of Love (EP)
- 2018: Dying For (Single)
- 2019: Water
- 2019: Letter (Single)
- 2020: Flower of Devotion
- 2021: Flower of Devotion Remixed
- 2022: Blue Skies
- 2024: Poetry
