= Sky Blues =

Sky Blues may refer to:

- Coventry City F.C., in the English football league
- Sydney FC, in the Australian A-League
- Magherafelt Sky Blues F.C., in the Ballymena & Provincial Intermediate League of Northern Ireland

== See also ==
- Sky Blue (disambiguation)
- Blue Skies (disambiguation)
