= NE-HI =

American musician

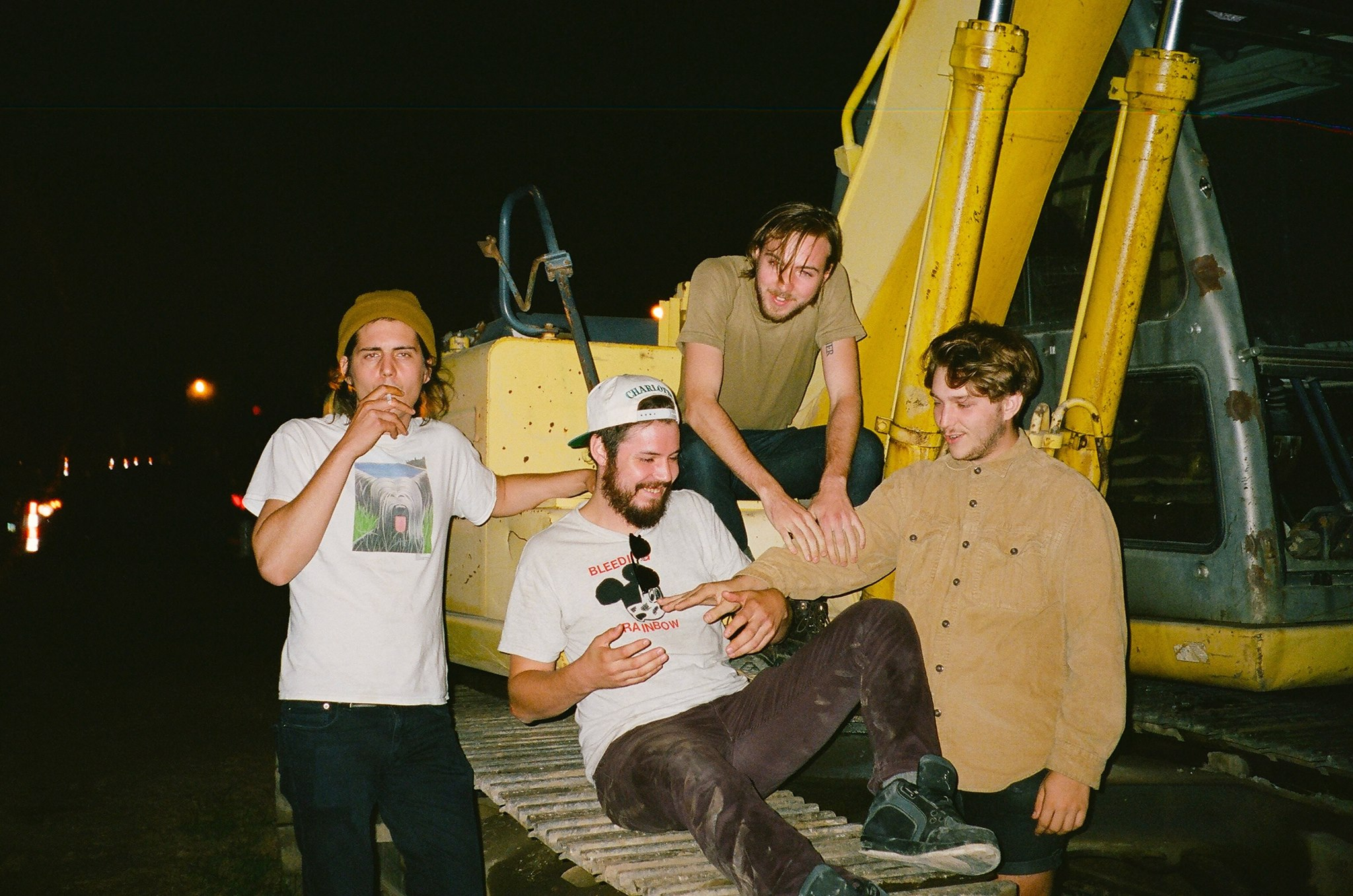

Background information
- Origin: Chicago, Illinois
- Genre: Rock
- Years active: 2013–2019
- Labels: Grand Jury Music, Manic Static
- Members: Jason Balla, Alex Otake, Michael Wells, James Weir
- Website: nehimusic.com

NE-HI was a four-piece rock band from Chicago. NE-HI formed to score a friend's film in the summer of 2013, the foursome—made up of Alex Otake, James Weir, Jason Balla and Mikey Wells—recognized the chemistry between its four members and chose to continue making music. Between that time and their breakup in 2019, the foursome toured the Midwest and East Coast, including a set at the Pitchfork Music Festival. They proved to be a group of promising musicians.

Known for their energetic stage presence, NE-HI opened for Car Seat Headrest and the American Wrestlers. NE-HI's self-titled debut album was released in 2014 on Manic Static. In the Chicago Tribune, Greg Kot listed Ne-Hi as #4 in his top ten local indie albums list of the year. Despite being a fairly new band, sites like Noisey, Stereogum, and Paste have taken notice and consider the band to be "the best of what's next".

The band's second album Offers was released February 24, 2017 on Grand Jury Music. To help promote their second album, OFFERS, the band toured with Whitney, Chad VanGaalen, Twin Peaks, The Drums, as well as performed in the Pitchfork Music Festival and at SXSW. The second album has also garnered a lot of buzz from various media outlets, Dan Hyman writing for the Chicago Mag praised the band's ability to "balance the turbulent and the tranquil". With the increasing popularity of the indie band, members continued to perfect their sound, while staying true to their roots, as noted when the album was reviewed as part of Bandcamp's "Album of the Day" report. The lead single, Stay Young, has been a favorite of reviewers, due to its liveliness and accompanying music video, a feature guitarist Jason Balla says was an intentional allusion to Chicago, "With our city's reputation for wind, it only seemed fitting that we bring some winds of change to the video." Paste Magazine's Zach Blumenfeld also points out the noticeable evolution of NE-HI's sound from the first to second album, comparing the first to "cookie dough" and the second to "a delectable batch of baked goods". On the song, "Sisters", David Anthony from The AV Club admires the band's "attention to detail" when composing their "tightly constructed" yet "effervescent" songs.

== Discography ==
=== LPs ===
- 2014: NE-HI
- 2017: OFFERS

=== Singles ===
- 2017: Stay Young
- 2015: Turncoat
- 2015: Drag
- 2014: Since I've Been Thinking
