= Blue Cloud =

Blue Cloud may refer to:

== Places ==
- Blue Cloud Lake, Foster County, North Dakota, USA; a lake

=== Facilities and structures ===
- Blue Cloud Abbey, Grant County, South Dakota, USA; a Benedictine monastery
- Blue Cloud Bridge (Korean: 청운교), Bulguksa, Tohamsan, Jinhyeon-dong, Gyeongju, North Gyeongsang Province, South Korea; a bridge
- Blue Cloud Movie Ranch, Santa Clarita, California, USA; a movie ranch
- Blue Cloud Wind Farm, Bailey, Lamb, Texas, USA; see List of power stations in Texas
- Saint Blue Cloud's House, Nashville, Indiana, USA; the home of Onya La Tour

=== Location types ===
- Blue cloud galaxy, a galaxy type deriving from the galaxy color–magnitude diagram
- Blue cloud alley, a type of cold alley in Lingnan architecture

== People and characters ==
- Peter Blue Cloud (1933–2011, surname: Blue Cloud), a Mohawk poet

=== Characters ===
- Master Blue Cloud, a fictional character from the story Blood and Plum Blossoms
- Mrs. Blue Cloud, a fictikonal character from the 2002 U.S. film Skins (2002 film)
- Blue Cloud, a fictional character from the 2017 Taiwanese film The Village of No Return
- Blue Cloud, a mythological figure from the Navajo creation myth Diné Bahaneʼ

== Plants and animals ==
- Blue Cloud, a cultivar of the flower Nemesia (plant)
- Blue Cloud, a cultivar of the Geranium flower
- Blue Cloud (horse), a racehorse that won the 1999 Prix Imprudence

== Music ==
- "Blue Cloud" (song), a 1955 song by Billy Taylor off the album A Touch of Taylor
- "Blue Cloud" (song), former name of the 1967 Billy Strayhorn tune "Blood Count"
- "Blue Cloud" (song), a 1983 song by Daniel Johnston off the album More Songs of Pain
- "Blue Cloud" (song), a 2007 single by Ghost (2004 band)
- "Blue Cloud" (song), a 2016 song by Tomasz Stanko off the album December Avenue (Stańko album)
- "Blue Cloud" (song), a 2017 song by Wand off the album Plum (album)

== Other uses ==
- Blue Cloud (icon,), a shell icon overlay; see List of shell icon overlay identifiers
- Blue Cloud Ventures, a U.S. venture capital firm
- Ateneo Blue Cloud, an online platform and virtual campus for Ateneo de Manila University, Quezon City, Philippines
- Blue Cloud, an annual festival in August at Poços de Caldas, Brazil; a car gathering for Auto Union 1000
- Yokosuka R1Y Seiun (Japanese: Blue Cloud); see List of aircraft (Y)

== See also ==
- Blue Sky (disambiguation)
- Blue smoke (disambiguation)
- Cloud (disambiguation)
- Blue (disambiguation)
