= STS-103 =

1999 American crewed spaceflight to the Hubble Space Telescope

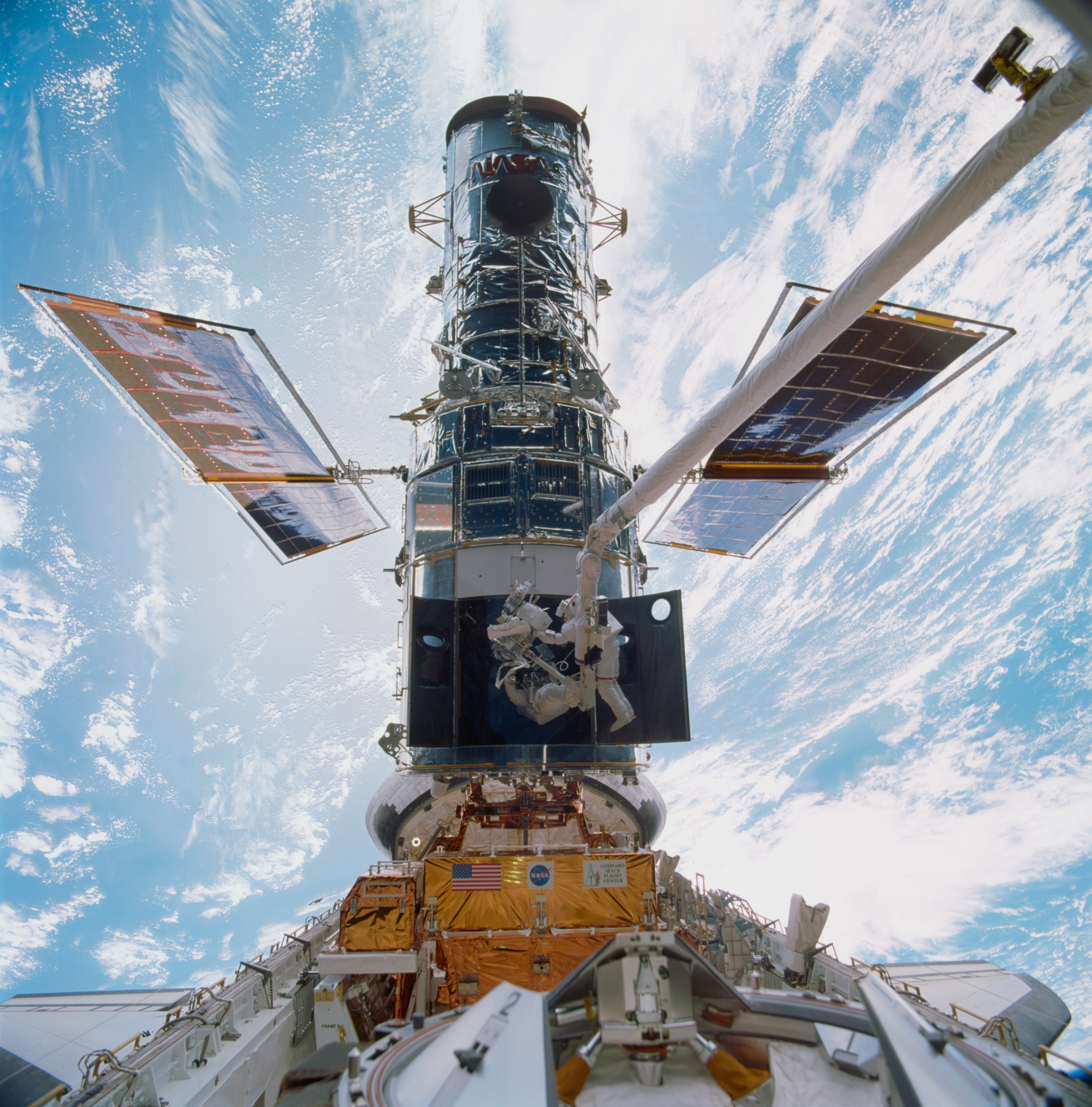
- Grunsfeld and Smith replacing gyroscopes on Hubble during the mission's first EVA
- Names: Space Transportation System-103
- Mission type: Hubble Space Telescope servicing
- Operator: NASA
- COSPAR ID: 1999-069A
- SATCAT no.: 25996
- Mission duration: 7 days, 23 hours, 11 minutes, 34 seconds
- Distance travelled: 5,230,000 kilometres (3,250,000 mi)

Spacecraft properties
- Spacecraft: Space Shuttle Discovery
- Launch mass: 112,493 kilograms (248,005 lb)
- Landing mass: 95,768 kilograms (211,132 lb)

Crew
- Crew size: 7
- Members: Curtis L. Brown Jr.; Scott J. Kelly; John M. Grunsfeld; Jean-François Clervoy; C. Michael Foale; Steven L. Smith; Claude Nicollier
- EVAs: 3
- EVA duration: 24 hours, 33 minutes

Start of mission
- Launch date: 20 December 1999 00:50:00 UTC
- Launch site: Kennedy, LC-39B

End of mission
- Landing date: 28 December 1999 00:01:34 UTC
- Landing site: Kennedy, SLF Runway 33

Orbital parameters
- Reference system: Geocentric
- Regime: Low Earth
- Perigee altitude: 563 kilometres (350 mi)
- Apogee altitude: 609 kilometres (378 mi)
- Inclination: 28.45 degrees
- Period: 96.4 minutes

Capture of Hubble
- RMS capture: December 22, 1999; 26 years ago, 00:34 UTC
- RMS release: December 25, 1999; 26 years ago, 11:03 UTC
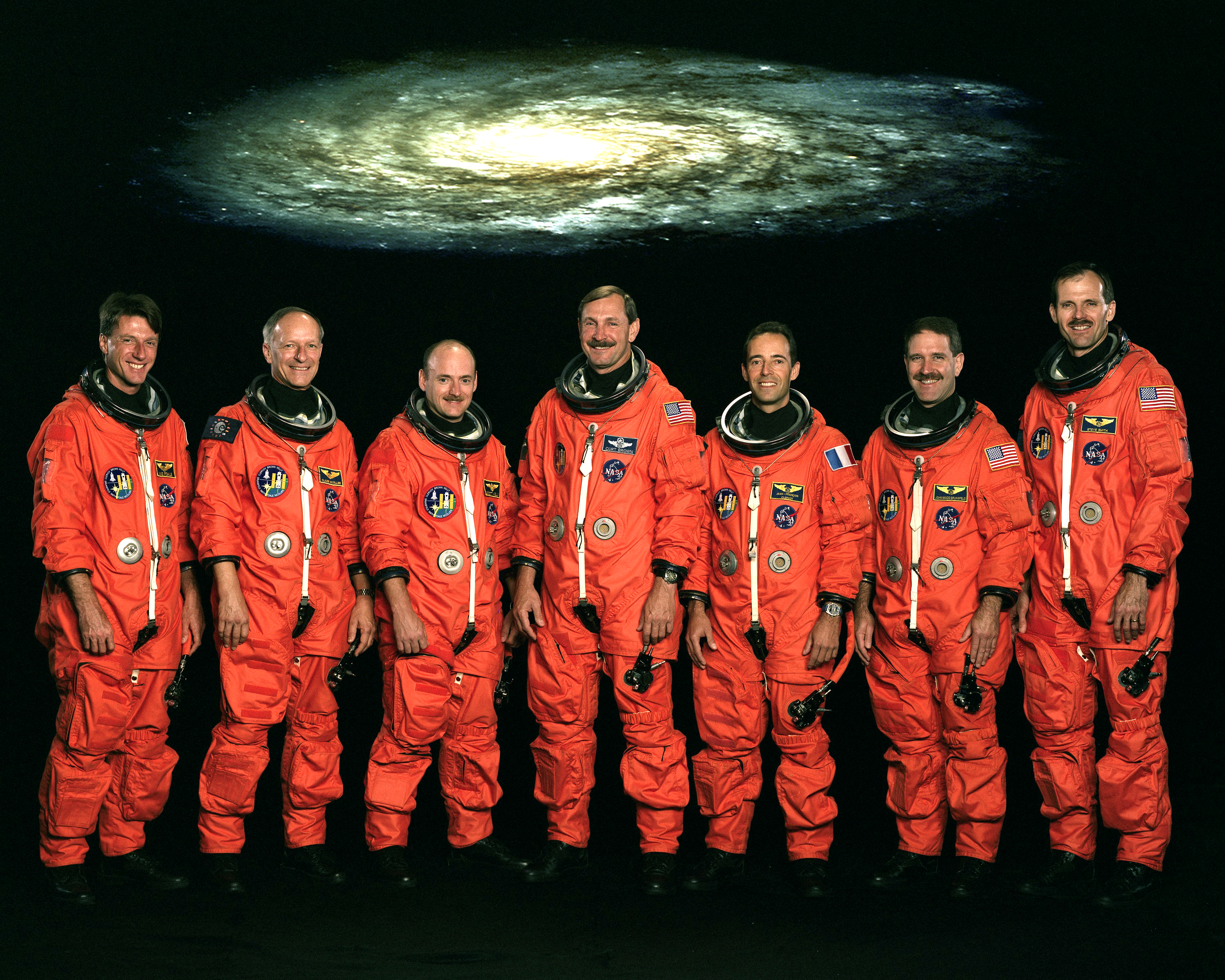
- Left to right; C. Michael Foale, Claude Nicollier, Scott J. Kelly, Curtis L. Brown Jr., Jean-Francois Clervoy, John M. Grunsfeld and Steven L. Smith Space Shuttle program Hubble Space Telescope missions

STS-103, the 96th launch of the Space Shuttle and the 27th launch of Space Shuttle Discovery, was Hubble Space Telescope Servicing Mission 3A ('SM3A'). It launched from Kennedy Space Center, Florida, on 19 December 1999 and returned on 27 December 1999 and was the last Shuttle mission of the 1990s. It was the only mission to span Christmas after being delayed by 13 days for technical and weather reasons.

== Crew ==
Position	Astronaut
Commander	(United States) Curtis L. Brown Jr. Sixth and last spaceflight
Pilot	(United States) Scott J. Kelly; First spaceflight
Mission Specialist 1	(United States) John M. Grunsfeld; Third spaceflight
Mission Specialist 2 Flight Engineer	(France) Jean-François Clervoy, ESA; Third and last spaceflight
Mission Specialist 3	(United States) / (United Kingdom) Michael Foale; Fifth spaceflight
Mission Specialist 4	(United States) Steven L. Smith; Third spaceflight
Mission Specialist 5	(Switzerland) Claude Nicollier, ESA; Fourth and last spaceflight

=== Space walks ===
- Smith and Grunsfeld – EVA 1
- EVA 1 start: 22 December 1999 – 18:54 UTC
- EVA 1 end: 23 December 1999 – 03:09 UTC
- Duration: 8 hours, 15 minutes
- Foale and Nicollier – EVA 2
- EVA 2 start: 23 December 1999 – 19:06 UTC
- EVA 2 end: 24 December 1999 – 03:16 UTC
- Duration: 8 hours, 10 minutes
- Smith and Grunsfeld – EVA 3
- EVA 3 start: 24 December 1999 – 19:17 UTC
- EVA 3 end: 25 December 1999 – 03:25 UTC
- Duration: 8 hours, 8 minutes

=== Crew seat assignments ===
Seat	Launch	Landing	Seats 1–4 are on the flight deck. Seats 5–7 are on the mid-deck.
1	Brown		Seats 1–4 are on the flight deck. Seats 5–7 are on the mid-deck.
2	Kelly		Seats 1–4 are on the flight deck. Seats 5–7 are on the mid-deck.
3	Grunsfeld	Foale	Seats 1–4 are on the flight deck. Seats 5–7 are on the mid-deck.
4	Clervoy		Seats 1–4 are on the flight deck. Seats 5–7 are on the mid-deck.
5	Foale	Grunsfeld	Seats 1–4 are on the flight deck. Seats 5–7 are on the mid-deck.
6	Smith		Seats 1–4 are on the flight deck. Seats 5–7 are on the mid-deck.
7	Nicollier		Seats 1–4 are on the flight deck. Seats 5–7 are on the mid-deck.

== Mission highlights ==
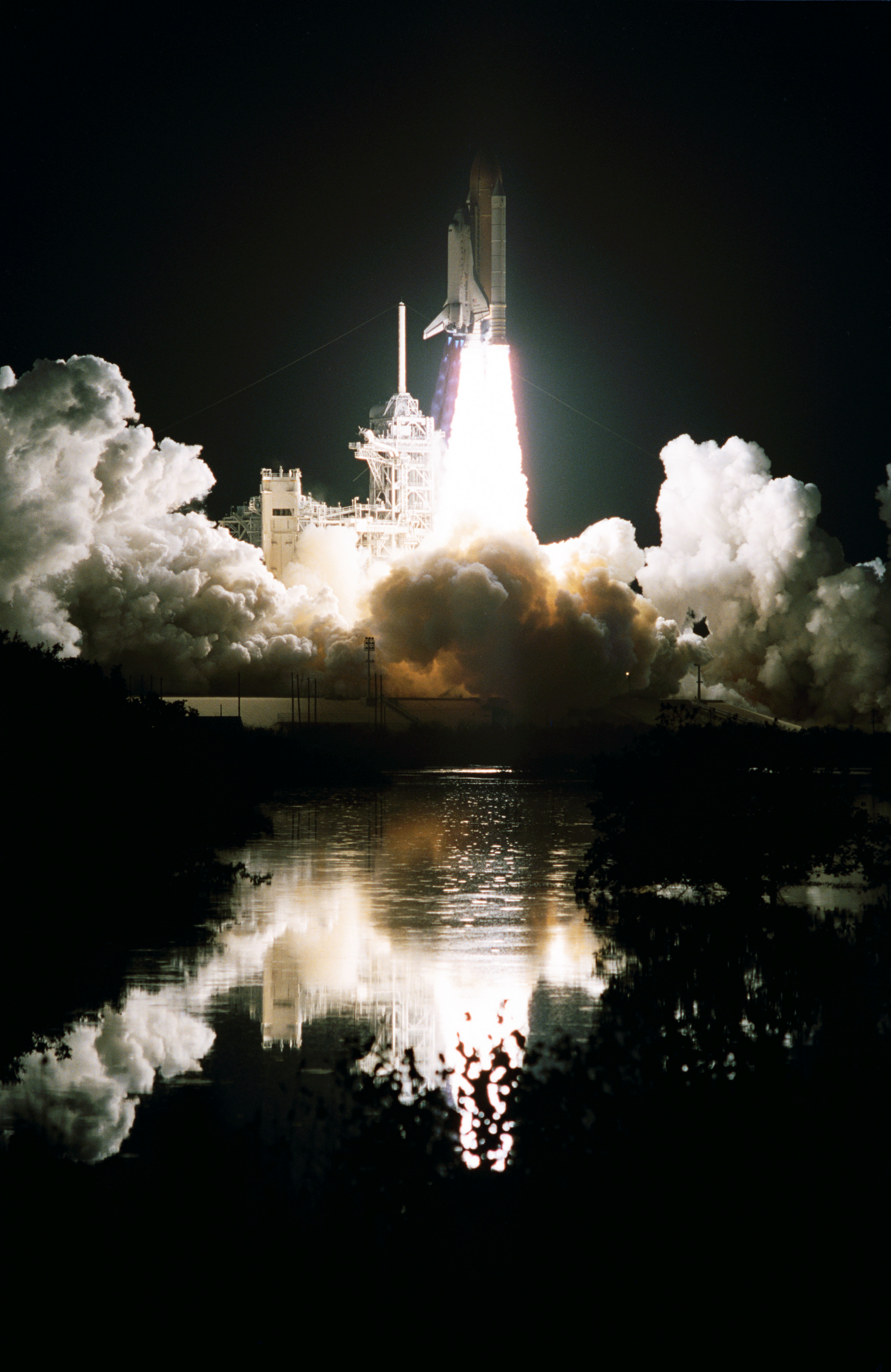
STS-103 launch

The primary objective of STS-103 was the Hubble Servicing Mission 3A. STS-103 had four scheduled Extravehicular Activity (EVA) days where four crew members worked in pairs on alternating days to renew and refurbish the telescope.

NASA officials decided to move up part of the servicing mission that had been scheduled for June 2000 after three of the telescope's six gyroscopes failed. Three gyroscopes must be working to meet the telescope's very precise pointing requirements, and the telescope's flight rules dictated that NASA consider a "call-up" mission before a fourth gyroscope failed. Four new gyros were installed during the first servicing mission (STS-61) in December 1993 and all six gyros were working during the second servicing mission (STS-82) in February 1997. Since then, a gyro failed in 1997, another in 1998 and a third in 1999. The Hubble team believed they understood the cause of the failures, although they could not be certain until the gyros were returned from space. Having fewer than three working gyroscopes would have precluded science observations, although the telescope would have remained safely in orbit until a servicing crew arrived.

Hubble's gyros spin at a constant rate of 19,200 rpm on gas bearings. This wheel is mounted in a sealed cylinder, which floats in a thick fluid. Electricity is carried to the motor by thin wires (approximately the size of a human hair). It is believed that oxygen in the pressurized air used during the assembly process caused the wires to corrode and break. The new gyros were assembled using nitrogen instead of oxygen. Each gyroscope is packaged in a Rate Sensor assembly. The Rate Sensors are packaged in pairs into an assembly called a Rate Sensor Unit (RSU). It is the RSUs that the STS-103's astronauts changed. The RSUs each weigh 11.0 kilograms (24.3 lb) and are 12.8 by 10.5 by 8.9 inches (325 by 267 by 226 mm) in size.

In addition to replacing all six gyroscopes on the December flight, the crew replaced a Fine Guidance Sensor (FGS) and the spacecraft's computer. The new computer reduced the burden of flight software maintenance and significantly lowered costs. The new computer was 20 times faster and had six times the memory of the DF-224 computer previously used on Hubble. It weighs 32.0 kilograms (70.5 lb) and is 18.8 by 18 by 13 inches (478 by 457 by 330 mm) in size. The FGS installed was a refurbished unit that was returned from Servicing Mission 2. It weighs 217 kilograms (478 lb) and is 5.5 by 4 by 2 feet (1.68 by 1.22 by 0.61 m) in size.

A voltage/temperature improvement kit (VIK) was also installed to protect spacecraft batteries from overcharging and overheating when the spacecraft goes into safe mode. The VIK modifies the charge cutoff voltage to a lower level to prevent battery overcharging and associated overheating. The VIK weighs about 1.4 kilograms (3.1 lb).

The Mars flag

The repair mission also installed a new S-Band Single Access Transmitter (SSAT). Hubble has two identical SSATs onboard and can operate with only one. The SSATs send data from Hubble through NASA's Tracking Data Relay Satellite System (TDRSS) to the ground. The new transmitter replaced one that failed in 1998. The SSAT weighs 3.9 kilograms (8.6 lb) and is 14 by 8 by 2 3/4 inches (356 by 203 by 70 mm).

A spare solid state recorder was also installed to allow efficient handling of high-volume data. Prior to the second servicing mission, Hubble used three 1970s-style reel-to-reel tape recorders. During the second servicing mission, one of these mechanical recorders was replaced with a digital solid state recorder. During this mission a second mechanical recorder was replaced by a second solid state recorder. The new recorder could hold approximately 10 times as much data as the old unit (12 gigabytes instead of 1.2 gigabytes). The recorder weighs 11.3 kilograms (25 lb) and is 12 by 9 by 7 inches in size.

Finally, the EVA crew replaced the telescope's outer insulation that had degraded. The insulation is necessary to control the internal temperature on the Hubble. The New Outer Blanket Layer (NOBL) and Shell/Shield Replacement Fabric (SSRF) help protect Hubble from the harsh environment of space. It protects the telescope from the severe and rapid temperature changes it experiences during each 90 minute orbit as it moves from sunlight to darkness.

STS-103 also carried hundreds of thousands of student signatures as part of the Student Signatures in Space (S3) program. The unique project provided elementary schools (selected on a rotating basis) with special posters to be autographed by students, then scanned onto disks and carried aboard a NASA Space Shuttle mission.

It was the Discovery's last solo spaceflight. All later missions by Discovery were International Space Station missions.

Astronaut John Grunsfeld, who was one of the mission specialists on this mission, brought a "Planet Mars Flag" aboard Discovery.

Attempt	Planned	Result	Turnaround	Reason	Decision point	Weather go (%)	Notes
1	16 Dec 1999, 9:18:00 pm	Scrubbed	—	Technical	16 Dec 1999, 4:30 pm (T−06:00:00 hold)	90	Concern about fuel line welds.
2	17 Dec 1999, 8:47:00 pm	Scrubbed	0 days 23 hours 29 minutes	Weather	17 Dec 1999, 8:52 pm (T−00:09:00 hold)	20	Low cloud ceiling and rain.
3	18 Dec 1999, 8:21:00 pm	Scrubbed	0 days 23 hours 34 minutes	Weather	18 Dec 1999, 12:30 pm (T−06:00:00 hold)	20	Lightning in KSC area.
4	19 Dec 1999, 7:50:00 pm	Success	0 days 23 hours 29 minutes			60	

== Wake-up calls ==
NASA began a tradition of playing music to astronauts during the Gemini program, which was first used to wake up a flight crew during Apollo 15. Each track is specially chosen, often by their families, and usually has a special meaning to an individual member of the crew, or is applicable to their daily activities.

Flight day	Song	Artist/composer
Day 2	"Takin' Care of Business"	Bachman–Turner Overdrive
Day 3	"Rendezvous"	Bruce Springsteen
Day 4	"Hucklebuck"	Beau Jocque and the Zydeco Hi-Rollers
Day 6	"Magic Carpet Ride"	Steppenwolf
Day 7	"I'll Be Home for Christmas"	Bing Crosby
Day 8	"We're So Good Together"	Reba McEntire
Day 9	"The Cup of Life"	Ricky Martin

== See also ==
- List of human spaceflights
- List of Space Shuttle missions
- Outline of space science
