= Deli Mike =

Airbus A340 aircraft with strange unreliability

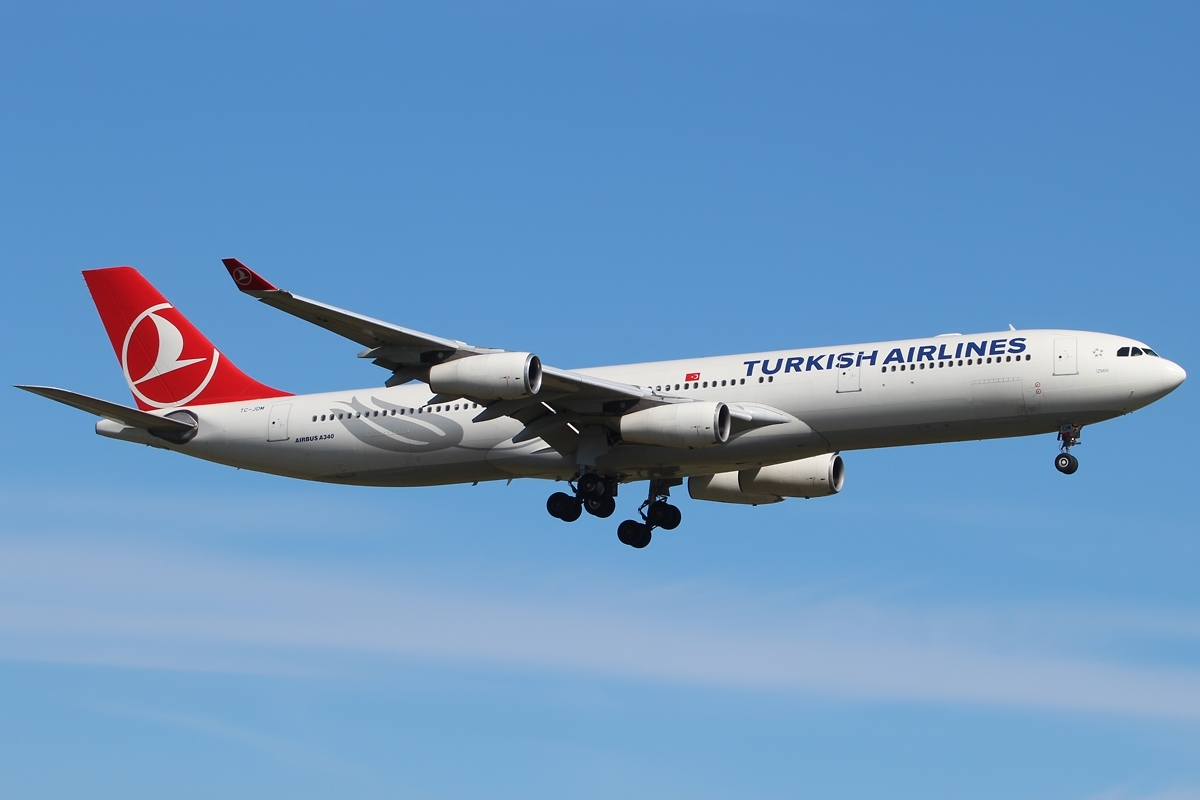
- Deli Mike in 2013

General information
- Other names: Deli Mayk; İzmir
- Type: Airbus A340-300
- Manufacturer: Airbus
- Owners: Turkish Airlines; Mahan Air
- Construction number: 115
- Registration: TC-JDM; 2-AVRA; XT-AKK; EP-MJC

History
- Manufactured: 1996
- First flight: 27 February 1996
- In service: 1996–2019; 2024–

Deli Mike or Deli Mayk (lit. 'Crazy Mike') is a nickname given to an Airbus A340-300 previously operated by Turkish Airlines with civil registration TC-JDM. The aircraft joined the Turkish Airlines fleet in 1996 to replace the McDonnell Douglas DC-10s of the airline and was used to operate long-haul flights out of Turkey. During its operation, Deli Mike had a record of having minor and strange technical failures such as its lights illuminating differently. This unreliability gave the aircraft its nickname, which is a wordplay on the ICAO spelling alphabet. In its late use, the aircraft operated both long-haul and short-haul flights. It was re-configured in 2016 to only have economy class seats and was solely used to carry pilgrims to Hajj.

Deli Mike was removed from the Turkish Airlines fleet in early 2019 and was flown to O. R. Tambo International Airport later that year and re-registered as 2-AVRA. After being stored at Johannesburg for almost 4 years, the aircraft was flown to Mehrabad International Airport in December 2022. The aircraft was allegedly acquired by a Burkinabe subsidiary of Iranian carrier Mahan Air in order to evade sanctions placed on the airline and country. The aircraft commenced operations with the airline in March 2024 as EP-MJC.

== Background ==
In the late 1980s, Turkish Airlines wanted to expand to North America and East Asia. The McDonnell Douglas DC-10s operated by the airline during that time were in the process of being phased out, leaving the Airbus A310 as the only option for these routes. However, the Airbus A310 did not have the range to fly to these destinations and would have had to make a stopover to refuel. In January 1990, after examining two possible aircraft types that were still in their design phase—the Airbus A340 and McDonnell Douglas MD-11—an internal commission unanimously voted to opt for the Airbus A340 as the replacement of McDonnell Douglas DC-10s due to its technical advantages and cost benefits over its competitor. On 27 March 1990, Turkish Airlines ordered five Airbus A340-300 aircraft, which included an option for a further five. TC-JDM, with serial number 115, rolled out of the production line on 27 February 1996 and joined the fleet of Turkish Airlines in April, becoming the fourth A340 to do so. The aircraft was given the name "İzmir".

== Technical failures and nickname ==
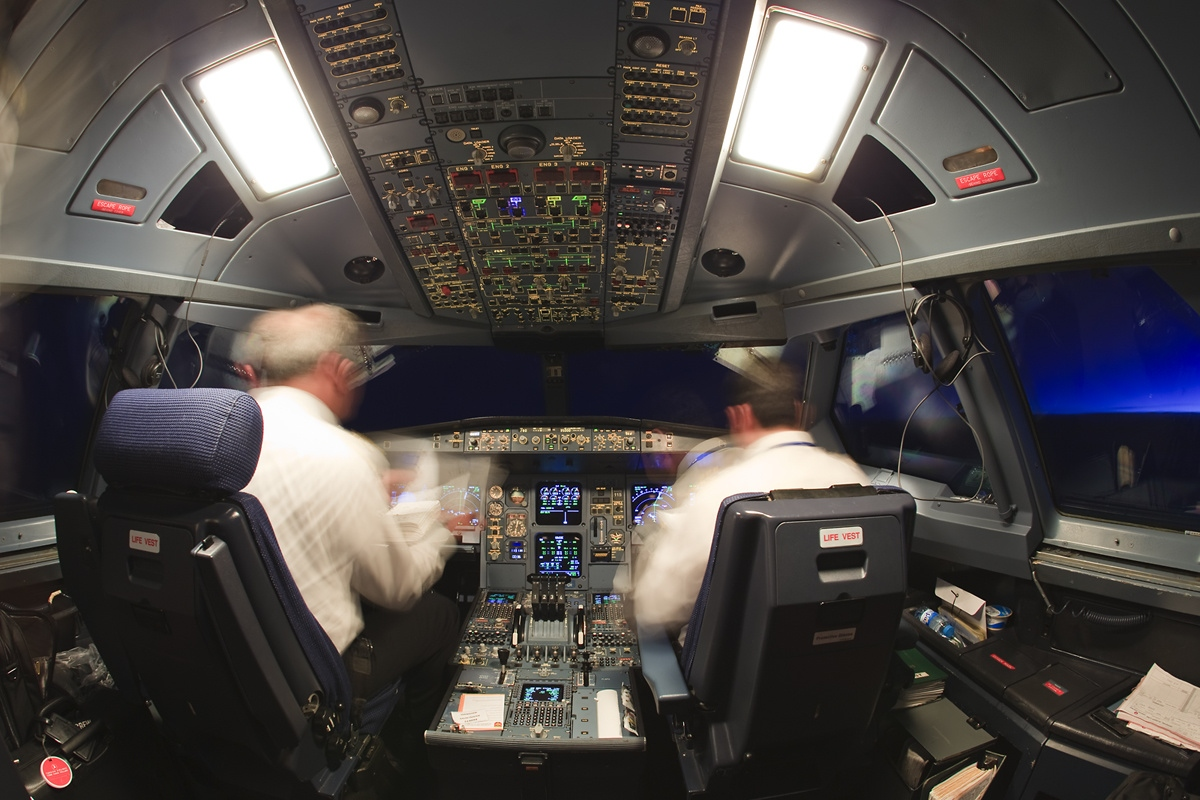
The cockpit of TC-JDM in-flight

Shortly after delivery, the aircraft started to have strange technical issues and failures. Sometimes, the aircraft would turn its external lights on by itself and then back off when someone tried to intervene. Occasionally, the lights of the emergency exits would turn on one by one from front to back "like a Mexican wave", not all at the same time, which according to the cabin crew meant that Deli Mike "was in a good mood". The aircraft also made "small jokes" to passengers and crew. On one occasion, the aircraft started sounding the master caution alarm in the cockpit, causing one of the inexperienced cabin crew members to panic. Frequent problems with the aircraft included the reading light of a completely different passenger turning on when the button is pressed, and the same issue occurring with the button used to call a crew member. One popular story among technical staff states that a senior employee fixed the faulty flight instruments of the aircraft simply by patting its door and saying "what happened to you big man?"

In the ICAO spelling alphabet used in aviation, the spelling of D and M, the final two letters of the civil registration of the aircraft, is "Delta Mike". Following the technical problems surrounding the aircraft, technicians of Turkish Airlines have swapped "Delta" to "Deli"—meaning "crazy" in Turkish—to reflect the characteristics of the aircraft, which resulted in the nickname "Deli Mike". (Note: Some sources use Turkified Mayk as an alternative to Mike.) According to technicians of Turkish Technic, the aircraft maintenance subsidiary of Turkish Airlines, "Deli Mike can fly to the other side of the world without any problems if she wants to. If she doesn't feel like it, she won't move even one metre on the ground." The technicians also removed and reinstalled all systems on-board and reset the software of the aircraft in an attempt to solve the issues, without any success.

== Subsequent history ==
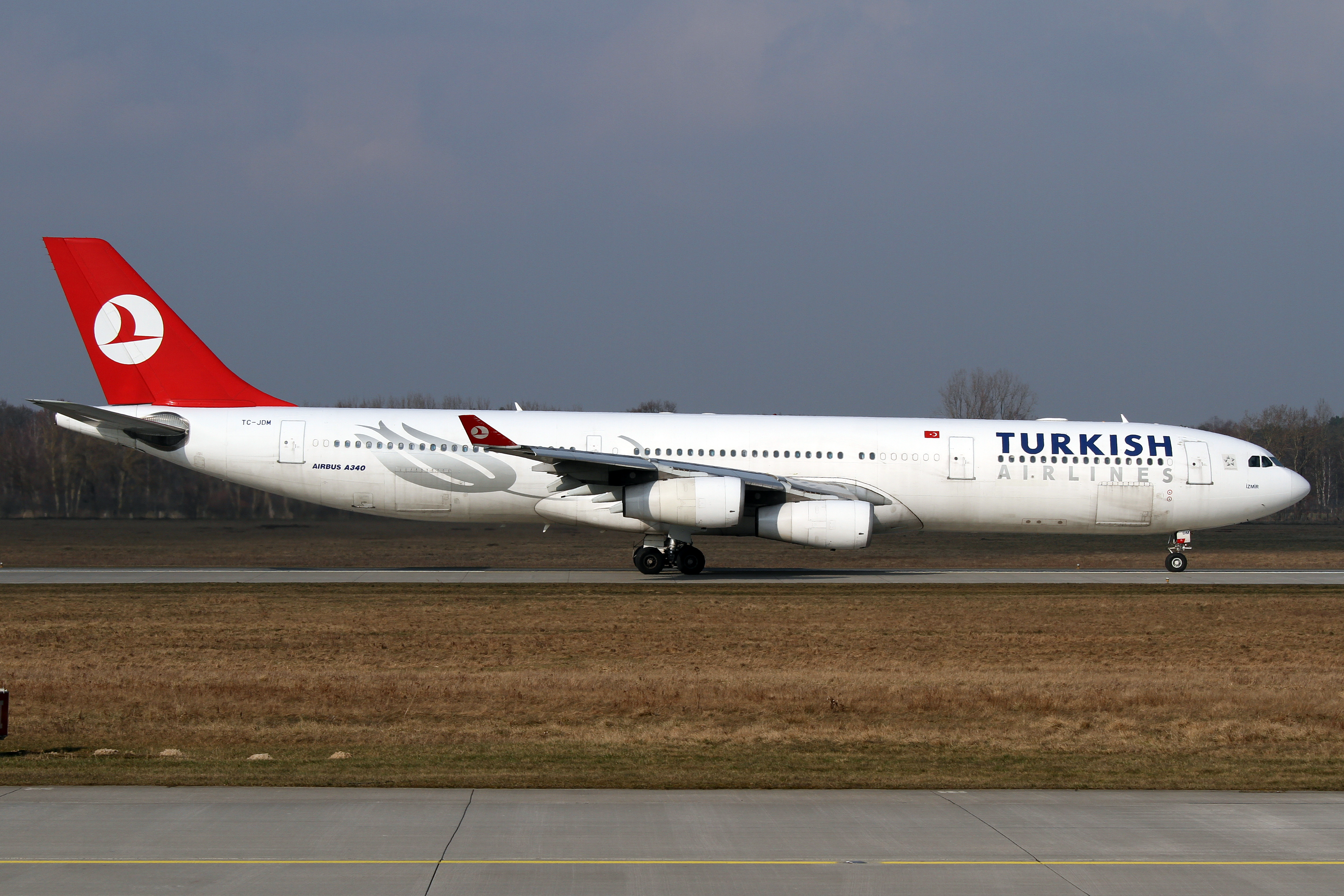
The aircraft in 2011 with the old livery

Despite their age, Airbus A340's were used as "jokers" in the 2010s, flying both short domestic and long-haul flights. On 2 September 2011, Deli Mike had a runway excursion while landing at Chhatrapati Shivaji Maharaj International Airport in Mumbai. The 93 passengers on-board were evacuated safely and none of the occupants were injured in the incident. The aircraft only received some minor damage. Turkish Airlines pulled its Airbus A340 aircraft from scheduled flights in May 2016. From July 2016 onward, TC-JDM and other A340 aircraft in the Turkish Airlines fleet were used on charter flights to carry passengers to Hajj. The aircraft was reconfigured to have an all-economy class layout, without any business class seats. During the winter period of 2016, a heavy downfall in traffic caused the airline to temporarily ground dozens of aircraft, including Deli Mike. In August 2017, Hürriyet reported that Turkish Airlines expected to maintain its Airbus A340 aircraft and use them for the Hajj flights until 2021 "thanks to good maintenance". Deli Mike was the oldest aircraft of the Turkish Airlines fleet as of September 2017. While criticizing Turkish Airlines in February 2018 for ordering new aircraft while many others were grounded in the meantime, Bora Erdin of pro-opposition newspaper Sözcü also added that the airline made "no clarification as to why the problematic plane [Deli Mike] was used persistently while unproblematic ones were on the ground" and highlighted the frequent issue of the landing gear not retracting after takeoff, causing the aircraft to return to the origin airport.

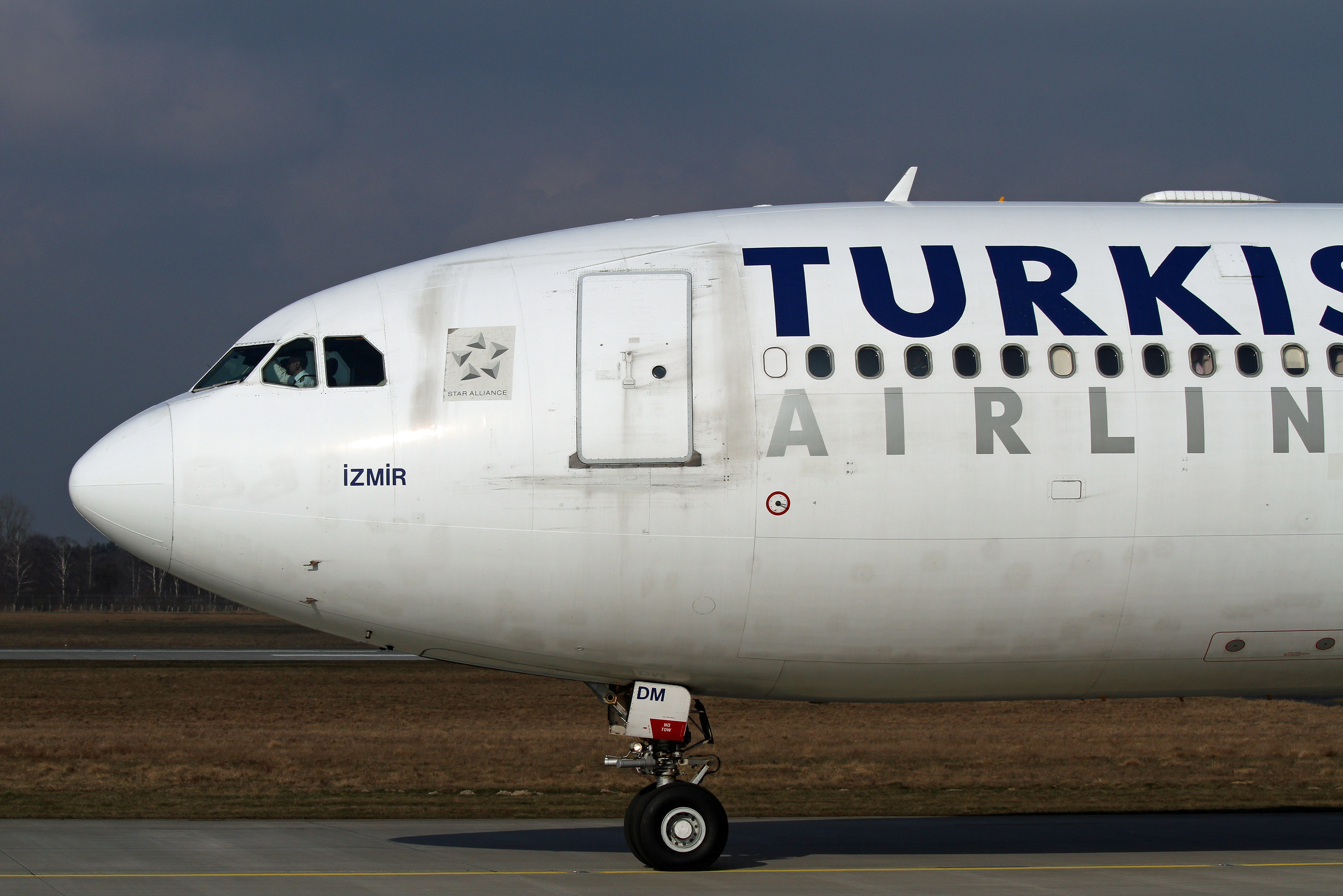
Close-up of the landing gear that frequently fails to retract after takeoff

On 22 October 2018, Turkish Airlines grounded TC-JDM alongside her sister aircraft TC-JDN at Istanbul Atatürk Airport. The aircraft was retired from the fleet in early January 2019; the livery of the airline was removed from the aircraft later that month. There was initial speculation about the plane being turned into a restaurant, as had previously happened to three sister aircraft. In March 2019, the aircraft was ferried to O. R. Tambo International Airport in Johannesburg, South Africa. Subsequently, the aircraft was sold to a Hong Kong-based company to be used by Africa Charter Airline and stored in Johannesburg where it was re-registered as 2-AVRA.

In December 2022, Deli Mike and three other former Turkish Airlines Airbus A340's flew again for the first time in years. The planes departed Johannesburg back to back on 24 December toward Uzbekistan, but all declared an emergency mid-flight, turned off their Automatic Dependent Surveillance–Broadcast systems and made an emergency landing at Mehrabad International Airport in Tehran. The airplane was transferred to a Mahan Air subsidiary based in Burkina Faso, through which it got the registration prefix of the country. (Note: The four aircraft were re-registered as XT-AHH, XT-AKB, XT-AKK and XT-ALM.) Shortly after it was alleged that the operation was carried out to evade sanctions placed on Iran, the Civil Aviation Organization confirmed the purchase of four Airbus A340 aircraft. The aircraft was later painted with the Mahan Air livery and received its Iranian registration, EP-MJC. It entered service with the airline on 19 March 2024 and was used in flights to Turkey.
