= Blue smoke =

Blue smoke may refer to:

== Technology ==
- Blue smoke (electronics), a smoke coming out of malfunctioning electronic circuits
- Aerogel or blue smoke, a synthetic porous ultralight material derived from a gel
- Bluesmoke (Linux), the former name of a set of Linux kernel modules for handling hardware-related errors

== Music ==
- "Blue Smoke", a 1949 song by Pixie Williams, written by Ruru Karaitiana
- "Blue Smoke", a 2013 song by Stone Sour from House of Gold & Bones – Part 2
- Blue Smoke (album), a 2014 album by Dolly Parton

== Other uses ==
- Blue Smoke (2007 film), an American romantic drama television film
- Blue Smoke (book), a 2011 book by Chris Bourke
- Blue Smoke (1935 film), a British sports film

== See also ==
- Blue (disambiguation)
- Smoke (disambiguation)
- Blue Sky (disambiguation)
- Blue Cloud (disambiguation)
