= Sky Blue (disambiguation) =

Sky blue is the name of a colour.

Sky Blue may also refer to:

- RAL 5015 Sky blue, a RAL color
- Sky Blue (film), a 2003 animated South Korean film
- Sky Blue (Maria Schneider album), released in 2007
- Sky Blue (Townes Van Zandt album), a 2019 posthumous album
- Sky Blue FC, a former name for a women's soccer team based in New Jersey, United States
- "Sky Blue" (song), by Peter Gabriel, 2002
- Sky Blue, the first half of Devin Townsend's 2014 double album Z²

== See also ==
- Sky Blu (Antarctica), a British Antarctic Survey station in Antarctica
- Sky Blu (rapper), stage name of Skyler Austen Gordy (born 1986)
- Skye Blue, professional wrestler
- Sky Blues (disambiguation)
- Blue Sky (disambiguation)
