= Blue Sky (airline) =

Armenian airline

Blue Airways
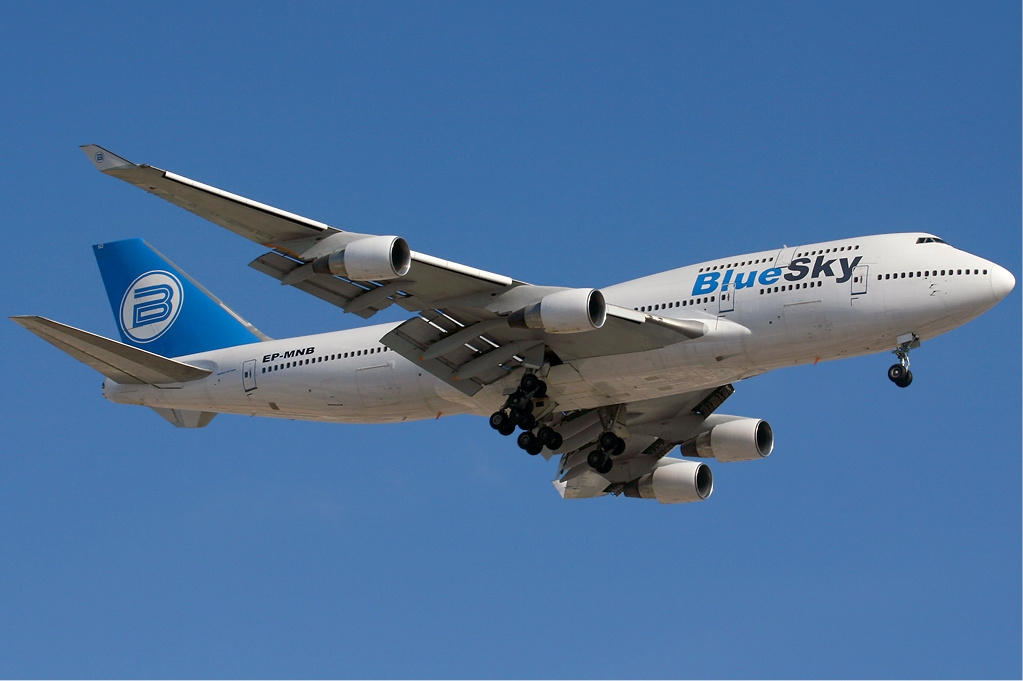
- Boeing 747-400
| IATA | ICAO | Call sign |
|---|---|---|
| - | BLM | BLUE ARMENIA |
- Founded: 2003
- Ceased operations: 2008
- Hubs: Yerevan, Armenia
- Headquarters: Yerevan, Armenia

Blue Sky was the trading name of Blue Airways, a charter airline from Armenia based in Yerevan. It was established in 2003 and started operations two years later. It mostly operated for Mahan Air of Iran. Operations were halted in 2008.

== Fleet ==
- 3 Boeing 747-400 (operated for Mahan Air, all stored in Iran)
- 1 Boeing 747-300 combi (operated for Mahan Air, stored in Iran)
- 1 Airbus A310-300 (operated for Mahan Air stored in Iran)
