= Blue Skies (Dehd album) =

Studio album by Dehd
- Released: May 27, 2022
- Studio: Fat Possum

Dehd chronology
Flower of Devotion (2020)	Blue Skies (2022)

Blue Skies is the fourth studio album by the band Dehd. The album was released on May 27, 2022, by Fat Possum.

== Background and recording ==
Dehd announced the new album in February 2022. The first single, "Bad Love" was released when the album was announced. In an interview with Nylon, band members Emily Kempf and Jason Balla respectively expressed agreement and disagreement that the album was similar to their previous album, Flower of Devotion.

== Critical reception ==
Professional ratings
Aggregate scores
Source	Rating
Metacritic	84/100
Review scores
Source	Rating
Pitchfork	7.7/10

In a review published by Pitchfork, Jayson Greene praised Dehd for remaining stylistically consistent with their previous album, Flower of Devotion. Greene wrote that "it can take a peculiar kind of nerve to stay the course". In a review for The Guardian, Ben Beaumont-Thomas referred to each song as individually "catchy and evocative" and the album as a whole as "casually masterly".

== Track listing ==
No.	Title	Length
1.	"Control"	1:45
2.	"Bad Love"	2:30
3.	"Bop"	1:30
4.	"Clear"	3:03
5.	"Hold"	1:53
6.	"Memories"	3:58
7.	"Window"	2:58
8.	"Palomino"	2:15
9.	"Waterfall"	2:25
10.	"Dream On"	2:43
11.	"Empty in My Mind"	2:52
12.	"Stars"	2:43
13.	"No Difference"	1:53
Total length:		32:34
