= Blue Sky Aviation Services =

Kenyan airline

IATA	ICAO	Call sign
-	SBK	MAWINGU
- Founded: 1996
- Hubs: Moi International Airport, Mombasa
- Secondary hubs: Wilson Airport, Nairobi
- Fleet size: 3
- Destinations: Amboseli, Lamu, Malindi, Mombasa, Nairobi, Ukunda, several airfields within Maasai Mara
- Headquarters: Nairobi
- Key people: Peter Ndavu, director Peter Mwaura, director of operations and safety
- Website: https://www.blueskyaviation.co.ke

Blue Sky Aviation Services is a domestic airline in Kenya. It has offices in Nairobi and Mombasa. The airline began operation in 1996 with a single Cessna 402. Their operating fleet consists of three Let L-410 Turbolet, model E9s and E20s. The Let 410 aircraft seats 19 passengers.

== Destinations ==
The destination list includes several airfields and cities throughout Kenya, including Nairobi, Lamu, Malindi, Mombasa, Ukunda and destinations in the interior of interest to tourists, such as several airfields within Maasai Mara and the Amboseli Airport.
