= Blue Sky Network =

Blue Sky Network, LLC
- Type: Private Limited Company
- Industry: Flight tracking, Fleet, Asset, GPS Satellite Tracking, Management, AFF
- Founded: 2001
- Headquarters: San Diego, California
- Products: SkyRouter, D1000A, D1000C, HawkEye 5200, HawkEye 5300, HawkEye 7200, HawkEye PT, HawkEye PT Plus, ACH1000, HawkEye Link]
- Number of employees: 11-50
- Website: www.blueskynetwork.com

Blue Sky Network, LLC, is a global satellite technology company headquartered in San Diego, California. Founded in 2001, Blue Sky Network offers satellite tracking solutions to support fleet managers and operators monitoring their assets on land, sea, and in the air. Blue Sky Network solutions use the satellite network from Iridium Communications to provide customers with 100 percent global coverage. The company has also been an authorized Tier 1 Iridium Communications partner since 2002.

== SkyRouter ==
SkyRouter is Blue Sky Network's fleet tracking and communications cloud-based web portal and mapping system. The SkyRouter web portal serves as a centralized command center for operators to track, view, communicate with and manage single field devices, or large global fleets. Features of SkyRouter include SMS support, customizable email subject formatting, alert information, and alert previews. The SkyRouter alerting system allows fleet managers to customize pertinent asset information directly to smart phones and tablets as necessary.

SkyRouter communicates with Blue Sky Network hardware to provide a secure web interface that displays positions on various overlay maps. It also handles, events, alerts, and telematic data.

SkyRouter also enables pilots and operators to communicate by sending two-way messages. Both the communications solutions and global tracking are made possible by transceivers that are installed in the asset. The transceivers both transmit and receive data signals, constantly updating the position and events associated with the assets. In aviation applications, Automated Flight Following via SkyRouter allows the transmission of satellite messages from aircraft to dispatchers on the ground in the form of special events reports, such as updates on take-offs and landings, as well as telemetric data reports, and emergency location.

== Mobile App ==
In 2014, Blue Sky Network announced the launch of the SkyRouter Mobile App for iOS. The app allows authorized users to view, track, and communicate with any Blue Sky Network equipped aircraft, vehicle, ship, or person in their organization. Through the app, users can track assets, communicate via email, and send/receive user defined forms including trip plans. Other features of the SkyRouter Mobile App include map options and overlays, QPOS push notifications, and breadcrumbs.

== Blue Sky Network Brazil ==
In 2010, Blue Sky Network became an official service partner of Iridium Serviçios de Satellites S.A., a subsidiary of Iridium Communications Inc. The following year, Blue Sky Network Brazil Comunicação por Satélite obtained a Non Geostationary Satellite Global Mobile Service (SMGS) license in Brazil, enabling the company to provision Iridium-based satellite services in Brazil.

In order to run the daily operations in Brazil, sister company Blue Sky Network Brazil Comunicação por Satélite was established in Alphaville, just outside São Paulo. The company currently provides GPS tracking and satellite communication services to civilian and government aviation operations. In 2008, Lider Taxi Aereo, the country's largest provider of helicopter and executive aviation services, outfitted its 40-aircraft offshore helicopter fleet with Blue Sky Network technology.

Under Brazilian regulations, telecommunications products that are sold and used in Brazil must have a Certificate of Conformity issued by a Designated Certification Body, indicating that they comply with Brazilian regulatory requirements. Products must also be approved and homologated by Anatel, the Brazilian National Telecommunications Agency. In 2013, Blue Sky Network announced that its HawkEye 5300 received Homologation Certification from Anatel, and in 2015 for its HawkEye 7200 portable Iridium satellite tracking solution.

== Products ==
Blue Sky Network's line of products includes fixed-install, portable and handheld satellite tracking and SATCOM solutions. Installed and tracking devices include the D1000A, D1000C, ACH1000, HawkEye Link, HawkEye 5200, and HawkEye 5300. Among Blue Sky Network's portable products are the HawkEye PT, HawkEye PT Plus, and HawkEye 7200
