= Blue skies research =

Curiosity-driven scientific research, without a clear practical goal

Blue skies research, also called blue sky science, is scientific research in domains where "real-world" applications are not immediately apparent. It has been defined as "research without a clear goal" and "curiosity-driven science". Proponents of this mode of science argue that unanticipated scientific breakthroughs are sometimes more valuable than the outcomes of agenda-driven research, heralding advances in genetics and stem cell biology as examples of unforeseen benefits of research that was originally seen as purely theoretical in scope. Because of the inherently uncertain return on investment, blue-sky projects are sometimes politically and commercially unpopular and tend to lose funding to research perceived as being more reliably profitable or practical.

== Terminology ==
The term blue sky research comes from a 1976 retrospective of research done in 1869 on why the sky is blue. This research was initially thought to be of no value but led to many other discoveries of much more direct use. Blue skies research is sometimes used interchangeably with the term "basic research".

== History ==
Support for blue skies research has varied over time, ultimately becoming subject to the political process, in countries such as the United States, the United Kingdom, and India. Vannevar Bush's 1945 report, Science: The Endless Frontier, made the argument for the value of basic research in the postwar era, and was the basis for many appeals to the federal funding of basic research. The 1957 launch of Sputnik prompted the United States Air Force Office of Scientific Research to sponsor blue skies research into the 1960s. By the 1970s, financial strains brought pressure on public expenditure on the sciences, first in the UK and the Netherlands, and by the 1990s in Germany and the United States.

In 1980, BP established a blue skies research initiative called the Venture Research Unit, headed by particle physicist Donald Braben. Braben controversially challenged peer review as the mechanism for establishing funding, emphasizing the selection of researchers whose proposals "could radically change the way we think about something important."

In 2005, Mark Walport, director of the Wellcome Trust and former Professor of Medicine at Imperial College, London, warned that excessive emphasis on agenda-driven research could jeopardise serendipitous advances in science:

The Government is right to recognise the importance of science and technology, but I think it is a mistake to try to ring-fence funds. There is a serious danger that we will spend money on projects that are less good. It is absolutely key that funding is used to support the best scientists with the best ideas.

When UK research councils introduced a requirement that grant applications include a 2-page statement on the economic impact of the proposed work, 20 scientists, including 1996 Nobel laureate Sir Harold Kroto, wrote a public letter to Times Higher Education condemning the requirement and calling for peer reviewers to ignore the additional documentation.

== Grants and conferences ==
Until 2020 The Royal Society granted up to 1 million pounds sterling annually in Theo Murphy Blue Skies awards. The award was to fund "research which is considered to be original and exciting but lacks a sufficient evidence base in the literature to be supported by traditional grant schemes."

The UK-based Engineering and Physical Sciences Research Council (EPSRC) operates a program called the IDEAS Factory, intended to promote "blue sky, curiosity-led research."

The international Organisation for Economic Co-operation and Development (OECD) holds a "Blue Sky Forum" every decade.

== Subjects ==
Owing to its radical nature, blue sky science may challenge accepted scientific paradigms and introduce entirely new fields of study. It has been the inspiration for numerous works of science fiction. It has sometimes been concerned with topics such as unexplained phenomena and the impact of future technologies upon society, asking questions such as "How would a spacecraft traverse a black hole and where would it arrive upon leaving it?" and "Will the universe end, or will it just expand ever outwards for eternity?"

== See also ==
- Applied science
- Instrumentalism
- Pure mathematics
- Applied mathematics

== Sources ==
- Balaram, P. (January 10, 1999). "Editorial: Blue sky research" (PDF). Current Science. 76 (1): 1.

== Bibliography ==
- Braben, Donald W. (2014). Promoting the Planck Club: How defiant youth, irreverent researchers and liberated universities can foster prosperity indefinitely. John Wiley and Sons Inc. ISBN 978-1-118-54642-0.
- Braben, Donald W. (2004). Pioneering Research: A Risk Worth Taking. John Wiley and Sons Inc. ISBN 978-0-471-48852-1.
- Braben, Donald W. (2008). Scientific Freedom: The Elixir of Civilization. John Wiley and Sons Inc. ISBN 978-0-470-22654-4.
