= Big Sky =

Big Sky may refer to:

== Arts and entertainment ==
=== Films ===
- Big Sky (film), a 2015 film directed by Jorge Michel Grau
- The Big Sky (film), a 1952 film by Howard Hawks, adapted from the novel

=== Music ===
==== Albums ====
- Big Sky, a 2000 album by Highway 101
- Big Sky (Brett Garsed album), a 2002 album by Brett Garsed
- Big Sky (One More Girl album), a 2009 album by One More Girl
- Big Sky (The Warratahs album), a 1993 album by The Warratahs

==== Songs ====
- "Big Sky" (song), from the Kinks' 1968 studio album The Kinks Are the Village Green Preservation Society
- "Big Sky", a 2004 song by Probot, from their self-titled debut album
- "Big Sky", a 1999 song by Runrig, from their album In Search of Angels
- "The Big Sky" (song), a 1986 song by Kate Bush

=== Other arts and entertainment ===
- Big Sky (Australian TV series), an Australian televised drama that ran from 1997 to 1999
- Big Sky (American TV series), a 2020 American procedural drama
- Big Sky (novel), a 2019 novel by Kate Atkinson
- The Big Sky (novel), a 1947 novel by A. B. Guthrie Jr.

== Businesses ==
- Big Sky Airlines, an American regional airline from 1978 to 2008
- Big Sky Brewing Company, a brewery in Missoula, Montana, United States
- Big Sky Credit Union, an Australia-based credit union
- Big Sky Resort, a ski resort in Big Sky, Montana

== People ==
- Big Sky, nickname of Tye Fields (born 1975), professional boxer
- Big Sky, a ring name, along with Tyler Mane, of Canadian actor and professional wrestler Daryl Karolat

== Other uses ==
- Big Sky, Montana, United States, a census-designated place
- Big Sky Airport, a general aviation airport near Ennis, Montana
- Big Sky Conference, an American collegiate athletic conference
- Big Sky High School, Missoula, Montana

== See also ==
- Big sky theory of transport
