= November 30 =

November 30 this year in various calendars
- Monday, 30 November 2026
Akan	Monodwo
Armenian	13 Kʿaloch 1476
Aztec	Tlacaxipehualiztli 19, 13 Malīnalli
Babylonian	19 Arakhsamna, 2337 SE
Balinese pawukon	Luang, Pepet, Kajeng, Laba, Umanis, Maulu, Coma of Taulu, Brahma, Dadi, Raksasa
Bengali	15 Ogrohayon, BS 1433
Chinese	Yang Earth Monkey・Net Mansion; Fire Horse Year, Month 10, Day 22 (Xiaoxue, 7 days until Daxue)
Common Era	30 November 2026 CE
Coptic	21 Hathor, AM 1743
Egyptian	18 Pharmuthi, 2775 NE
Ethiopian	21 H̱edār, 2019 Amätä Məhrät
French Republican	Décade I, Nonidi de Frimaire de l'Année 235 de la République
Gregorian	30 November, AD 2026
Hebrew	20 Kislev, AM 5787
Hindu	Āśleṣā・Indra; Solar: 14 Mārgaśīrṣa, 1948 SE; Lunisolar: Ṣaṣṭhī, Kṛishna pakṣa of Kārtika, 2083 VE; Rāudra・5127 KY・1,872,909
Icelandic	Mánudagur, 8 Ýlir 2026
Islamic	19 Jumada al-thani, AH 1448 (using tabular method)
ISO week date	2026-W49-1
Japanese	22 Kannazuki, Reiwa 8 (Shōsetsu, 7 days until Taisetsu)
Julian	17 November, AD 2026 (AM 7535)
Julian day	2461375
Korean	22 Dwaejidal, 4359 DE
Maya	13.0.14.2.12; 5 Mac, 13 Eb
Roman	ante diem XV Kalendas Decembres, MMDCCLXXIX AUC
Solar Hijri	9 Azar, SH 1405
Tibetan	22 smin drug, me pho rta 2153 or 1772 or 1000

<<	November					>>
Su	Mo	Tu	We	Th	Fr	Sa
1	2	3	4	5	6	7
8	9	10	11	12	13	14
15	16	17	18	19	20	21
22	23	24	25	26	27	28
29	30
2026

November 30 in recent years
2025 (Sunday)
2024 (Saturday)
2023 (Thursday)
2022 (Wednesday)
2021 (Tuesday)
2020 (Monday)
2019 (Saturday)
2018 (Friday)
2017 (Thursday)
2016 (Wednesday)

November 30 is the 334th day of the year (335th in leap years) in the Gregorian calendar; 31 days remain until the end of the year.

== Events ==
=== Pre-1600 ===
- 883 – Abu al Abbas celebrates a victory parade in Bagdhad following the suppression of the Zanj Rebellion, the largest slave revolt in the Arab world.
- 978 – Franco-German war of 978–980: Holy Roman Emperor Otto II lifts the siege of Paris and withdraws.

=== 1601–1900 ===
- 1707 – Queen Anne's War: The second Siege of Pensacola comes to end with the failure of the British Empire and their Creek allies to capture Pensacola, Spanish Florida.
- 1718 – Great Northern War: King Charles XII of Sweden dies during a siege of the fortress of Fredriksten in Norway.
- 1782 – American Revolutionary War: Treaty of Paris: In Paris, representatives from the United States and Great Britain sign preliminary peace articles (later formalized as the 1783 Treaty of Paris).
- 1786 – The Grand Duchy of Tuscany, under Pietro Leopoldo I, becomes the first modern state to abolish the death penalty (later commemorated as Cities for Life Day).
- 1803 – The Balmis Expedition starts in Spain with the aim of vaccinating millions against smallpox in Spanish America and Philippines.
- 1803 – In New Orleans, Spanish representatives officially transfer the Louisiana Territory to the French First Republic.
- 1853 – Crimean War: Battle of Sinop: The Imperial Russian Navy under Pavel Nakhimov destroys the Ottoman fleet under Osman Pasha at Sinop, a sea port in northern Turkey.
- 1864 – American Civil War: The Confederate Army of Tennessee led by General John Bell Hood suffers heavy losses in an attack on the Union Army of the Ohio under General John Schofield in the Battle of Franklin.
- 1872 – The first-ever international football match takes place at Hamilton Crescent, Glasgow, between Scotland and England.

=== 1901–present ===
- 1916 – Costa Rica signs the Buenos Aires Convention, a copyright treaty.
- 1936 – In London, the Crystal Palace is destroyed by fire.
- 1939 – World War II: The Soviet Red Army crosses the Finnish border in several places, bombing Helsinki and several other Finnish cities, starting the Winter War.
- 1940 – World War II: Signing of the Sino-Japanese Treaty of 1940 between the Empire of Japan and the newly formed Wang Jingwei-led Reorganized National Government of the Republic of China. This treaty was considered so unfair to China that it was compared to the Twenty-One Demands.
- 1941 – The Holocaust: The SS-Einsatzgruppen round up roughly 25,000 Jews from the Riga Ghetto and kill them in the Rumbula massacre.
- 1942 – World War II: Battle of Tassafaronga; A smaller squadron of Imperial Japanese Navy destroyers led by Raizō Tanaka defeats a U.S. Navy cruiser force under Carleton H. Wright.
- 1947 – Civil War in Mandatory Palestine begins, leading up to the creation of the State of Israel and the 1948 Arab–Israeli War.
- 1953 – Edward Mutesa II, the kabaka (king) of Buganda is deposed and exiled to London by Sir Andrew Cohen, Governor of Uganda.
- 1954 – In Sylacauga, Alabama, United States, the Hodges meteorite crashes through a roof and hits a woman taking an afternoon nap; this is the only documented case in the Western Hemisphere of a human being hit by a rock from space.
- 1962 – Eastern Air Lines Flight 512 crashes at Idlewild Airport, killing 25 people.
- 1966 – Decolonization: Barbados becomes independent from the United Kingdom.
- 1967 – The People's Republic of Southern Yemen gains its independence from the United Kingdom
- 1967 – The Pakistan Peoples Party is founded by Zulfikar Ali Bhutto, who becomes its first chairman.
- 1967 – Pro-Soviet communists in the Philippines establish Malayang Pagkakaisa ng Kabataan Pilipino as its new youth wing.
- 1971 – Iran seizes the Greater and Lesser Tunbs from the Emirates of Sharjah and Ras Al Khaimah.
- 1972 – Vietnam War: White House Press Secretary Ron Ziegler tells the press that there will be no more public announcements concerning American troop withdrawals from Vietnam because troop levels are now down to 27,000.
- 1981 – Cold War: In Geneva, representatives from the United States and the Soviet Union begin to negotiate intermediate-range nuclear weapon reductions in Europe. (The meetings end inconclusively on December 17.)
- 1995 – Official end of Operation Desert Storm.
- 1995 – U.S. President Bill Clinton visits Northern Ireland and speaks in favor of the "Northern Ireland peace process" to a huge rally at Belfast City Hall; he calls IRA fighters "yesterday's men".
- 1999 – Exxon and Mobil sign a US$73.7 billion agreement to merge, thus creating ExxonMobil, the world's largest company.
- 1999 – In Seattle, United States, demonstrations against a World Trade Organization meeting by anti-globalization protesters catch police unprepared and force the cancellation of opening ceremonies.
- 1999 – British Aerospace and Marconi Electronic Systems merge to form BAE Systems, Europe's largest defense contractor and the fourth largest aerospace firm in the world.
- 2000 – NASA launches STS-97, the 101st Space Shuttle mission.
- 2004 – A McDonnell Douglas MD-82, operating as Lion Air Flight 538, overran the runway at Adisoemarmo Airport and crashed, killing 25 people.
- 2005 – John Sentamu becomes the first black archbishop in the Church of England with his enthronement as the 97th Archbishop of York.
- 2007 – Atlasjet Flight 4203 crashes in Keçiborlu while on approach to Isparta Süleyman Demirel Airport, killing 57.
- 2018 – A magnitude 7.1 earthquake with its epicenter only 24 km from Anchorage, Alaska causes significant property damage but no deaths.
- 2021 – Barbados becomes a republic.
- 2021 – A 15-year-old gunman murders four students and injures seven people, including a teacher, in a mass shooting at Oxford High School in Oxford Township, Michigan.
- 2022 – The generative AI chatbot ChatGPT is launched by OpenAI.

== Births ==
=== Pre-1600 ===
- 539 – Gregory of Tours, French bishop and saint (probable; (died 594)
- 1310 – Frederick II, Margrave of Meissen (died 1349)
- 1340 – John, Duke of Berry (died 1416)
- 1364 – John FitzAlan, 2nd Baron Arundel, Scottish soldier (died 1390)
- 1426 – Johann IV Roth, Roman Catholic bishop (died 1506)
- 1427 – Casimir IV Jagiellon, King of Poland (died 1492)
- 1459 – Mingyi Nyo, founder of Toungoo dynasty of Burma (died 1530)
- 1466 – Andrea Doria, Italian admiral (died 1560)
- 1485 – Veronica Gambara, Italian poet and stateswoman (died 1550)
- 1508 – Andrea Palladio, Italian architect and theoretician, designed the Church of San Giorgio Maggiore and Teatro Olimpico (died 1580)
- 1549 – Sir Henry Savile, English scholar and mathematician (died 1622)
- 1554 – Philip Sidney, English soldier, courtier, and poet (died 1586)
- 1573 – Aubert Miraeus, Belgian historian (died 1640)
- 1594 – John Cosin, English bishop and academic (died 1672)
- 1599 – Andrea Sacchi, Italian painter (died 1661)

=== 1601–1900 ===
- 1614 – William Howard, 1st Viscount Stafford (died 1680)
- 1625 – Jean Domat, French scholar and jurist (died 1696)
- 1637 – Louis-Sébastien Le Nain de Tillemont, French historian and author (died 1698)
- 1642 – Andrea Pozzo, Jesuit Brother, architect and painter (died 1709)
- 1645 – Andreas Werckmeister, German organist, composer, and theorist (died 1706)
- 1667 – Jonathan Swift, Irish satirist and essayist (died 1745)
- 1670 – John Toland, Irish philosopher and author (died 1722)
- 1683 – Ludwig Andreas von Khevenhüller, Austrian field marshal (died 1744)
- 1699 – King Christian VI of Denmark (died 1746)
- 1719 – Princess Augusta of Saxe-Gotha, Princess of Wales (died 1772)
- 1723 – William Livingston, American lawyer and politician, 1st Governor of New Jersey (died 1790)
- 1729 – Samuel Seabury, First Episcopal Bishop in America (died 1796)
- 1748 – Joachim Albertini, Italian-Polish composer (died 1838)
- 1756 – Ernst Chladni, German physicist and author (died 1827)
- 1764 – Franz Xaver Gerl, Austrian singer and composer (died 1827)
- 1768 – Jędrzej Śniadecki, Polish physician, chemist, and biologist (died 1838)
- 1781 – Alexander Berry, Scottish surgeon, merchant, and explorer (died 1873)
- 1791 – Count Franz Philipp von Lamberg, Austrian field marshal and politician (died 1848)
- 1796 – Carl Loewe, German singer, composer, and conductor (died 1869)
- 1810 – Oliver Winchester, American businessman and politician, founded the Winchester Repeating Arms Company (died 1880)
- 1813 – Louise-Victorine Ackermann, French poet and author (died 1890)
- 1813 – Charles-Valentin Alkan, French pianist and composer (died 1888)
- 1817 – Theodor Mommsen, German jurist, historian, and scholar, Nobel Prize laureate (died 1903)
- 1821 – Frederick Temple, English archbishop and academic (died 1902)
- 1825 – William-Adolphe Bouguereau, French painter and educator (died 1905)
- 1832 – James Dickson, English-Australian politician, 13th Premier of Queensland (died 1901)
- 1835 – Mark Twain, American novelist, humorist, and critic (died 1910)
- 1836 – Lord Frederick Cavendish, Anglo-Irish soldier and politician, Chief Secretary for Ireland (died 1882)
- 1840 – Henry Birks, Canadian businessman, founded Birks & Mayors (died 1928)
- 1843 – Martha Ripley, American physician (died 1912)
- 1847 – Afonso Pena, Brazilian lawyer and politician, 6th President of Brazil (died 1909)
- 1857 – Bobby Abel, English cricketer (died 1936)
- 1858 – Jagadish Chandra Bose, Indian physicist, biologist, botanist, and archaeologist (died 1937)
- 1863 – Andrés Bonifacio, Filipino activist and politician, co-founded Katipunan (died 1897)
- 1866 – Andrey Lyapchev, Bulgarian politician, Prime Minister of Bulgaria (died 1933)
- 1869 – Gustaf Dalén, Swedish physicist and engineer, Nobel Prize laureate (died 1937)
- 1869 – James Hamilton, 3rd Duke of Abercorn, English lawyer and politician, Governor of Northern Ireland (died 1953)
- 1872 – Maurice de la Taille, French Jesuit priest (died 1933)
- 1872 – John McCrae, Canadian physician, soldier, and poet (died 1918)
- 1873 – Božena Benešová, Czech author and poet (died 1936)
- 1874 – Winston Churchill, English colonel, journalist, and politician, Prime Minister of the United Kingdom, Nobel Prize laureate (died 1965)
- 1874 – Lucy Maud Montgomery, English-Canadian author and poet (died 1942)
- 1875 – Myron Grimshaw, American baseball player (died 1936)
- 1875 – Otto Strandman, Estonian lawyer and politician, 2nd Prime Minister of Estonia (died 1941)
- 1883 – Gustav Suits, Estonian-Swedish poet and politician (died 1956)
- 1887 – Andrej Gosar, Slovenian economist, lawyer, and politician (died 1970)
- 1887 – Beatrice Kerr, Australian swimmer and diver (died 1971)
- 1888 – Harry Altham, English cricketer and coach (died 1965)
- 1889 – Edgar Adrian, 1st Baron Adrian, English physiologist and academic, Nobel Prize laureate (died 1977)
- 1889 – Reuvein Margolies, Ukrainian-Israeli author and scholar (died 1971)
- 1898 – Firpo Marberry, American baseball player and manager (died 1976)

=== 1901–present ===
- 1904 – Clyfford Still, American painter and educator (died 1980)
- 1906 – John Dickson Carr, American author and playwright (died 1977)
- 1906 – Andrés Henestrosa, Mexican poet, linguist, and politician (died 2008)
- 1907 – Jacques Barzun, French-American historian and author (died 2012)
- 1909 – Robert Nighthawk, American singer and guitarist (died 1967)
- 1911 – Carle Hessay, German-Canadian painter (died 1978)
- 1911 – Jorge Negrete, Mexican singer and actor (died 1953)
- 1912 – Jaan Hargel, Estonian flute player, conductor, and educator (died 1966)
- 1912 – Gordon Parks, American photographer and director (died 2006)
- 1915 – Brownie McGhee, American folk-blues singer and guitarist (died 1996)
- 1915 – Henry Taube, Canadian-American chemist and academic, Nobel Prize laureate (died 2005)
- 1916 – Dena Epstein, American musicologist and author (died 2013)
- 1916 – Michael Gwynn, English actor (died 1976)
- 1918 – Efrem Zimbalist, Jr., American actor (died 2014)
- 1919 – Jane C. Wright, American oncologist and cancer researcher (died 2013)
- 1920 – Virginia Mayo, American actress (died 2005)
- 1924 – Elliott Blackstone, American police officer and activist (died 2006)
- 1924 – Shirley Chisholm, American activist, educator and politician (died 2005)
- 1924 – Allan Sherman, American actor, comedian, singer, producer, and screenwriter (died 1973)
- 1925 – Maryon Pittman Allen, American journalist and politician (died 2018)
- 1925 – William H. Gates, Sr., American lawyer and philanthropist (died 2020)
- 1926 – Teresa Gisbert Carbonell, Bolivian architect and art historian (died 2018)
- 1926 – Richard Crenna, American actor, director, and producer (died 2003)
- 1926 – Andrew Schally, Polish-American endocrinologist (died 2024)
- 1927 – Robert Guillaume, American actor and singer (died 2017)
- 1928 – Takako Doi, Japanese scholar and politician 68th Speaker of the House of Representatives of Japan (died 2014)
- 1928 – Joe B. Hall, American basketball player and coach (died 2022)
- 1928 – Steele Hall, Australian politician, 36th Premier of South Australia (died 2024)
- 1928 – Andres Narvasa, Filipino lawyer and jurist, 19th Chief Justice of the Supreme Court of the Philippines (died 2013)
- 1928 – Elmira Nazirova, Azerbaijani composer (died 2014)
- 1929 – Dick Clark, American television host and producer, founded Dick Clark Productions (died 2012)
- 1929 – Joan Ganz Cooney, American screenwriter and producer, co-created Sesame Street
- 1930 – G. Gordon Liddy, American lawyer, radio host, television actor and criminal (died 2021)
- 1931 – Vivian Lynn, New Zealand artist (died 2018)
- 1931 – Bill Walsh, American football player and coach (died 2007)
- 1931 – Margot Zemach, American author and illustrator (died 1989)
- 1932 – Bob Moore, American bassist (died 2021)
- 1932 – Cho Nam-chul, South Korean Go player (died 2006)
- 1933 – Norman Deeley, English footballer and manager (died 2007)
- 1933 – Sam Gilliam, American painter and educator (died 2022)
- 1934 – Marcel Prud'homme, Canadian politician (died 2017)
- 1935 – Woody Allen, American actor, director, and screenwriter
- 1936 – Dmitri Anosov, Russian mathematician and academic (died 2014)
- 1936 – Abbie Hoffman, American activist and author, co-founded the Youth International Party (died 1989)
- 1937 – Jimmy Bowen, American record producer, songwriter, and pop singer
- 1937 – Praveen Chaudhari, Indian-American physicist and academic (died 2010)
- 1937 – Frank Ifield, English-Australian singer and guitarist (died 2024)
- 1937 – Luther Ingram, American R&B/soul singer-songwriter (died 2007)
- 1937 – Ridley Scott, English director, producer, and production designer
- 1937 – Tom Simpson, English cyclist (died 1967)
- 1937 – Adeline Yen Mah, Chinese-American physician and author
- 1938 – Jean Eustache, French director, producer, and screenwriter (died 1981)
- 1938 – John M. Goldman, English haematologist and oncologist (died 2013)
- 1940 – Kevin Phillips, American political analyst and author (died 2023)
- 1940 – Dan Tieman, American basketball player and coach (died 2012)
- 1941 – Phil Willis, Baron Willis of Knaresborough, English politician
- 1943 – Norma Alarcón, American author and professor
- 1943 – Terrence Malick, American director, producer, and screenwriter
- 1944 – George Graham, Scottish footballer and manager
- 1945 – Hilary Armstrong, Baroness Armstrong of Hill Top, English academic and politician, Chancellor of the Duchy of Lancaster
- 1945 – Roger Glover, Welsh bass player, songwriter, and producer
- 1945 – Vani Jairam, Indian playback singer (died 2023)
- 1945 – John R. Powers, American author and playwright (died 2013)
- 1946 – George Duffield, English jockey and trainer
- 1947 – Sergio Badilla Castillo, Chilean-Swedish poet and translator
- 1947 – David Mamet, American playwright, screenwriter, and director
- 1949 – Jim Chones, American basketball player
- 1949 – Matthew Festing, 79th Prince and Grand Master of the Sovereign Military Order of Malta (died 2021)
- 1949 – Jimmy London, Jamaican singer-songwriter
- 1949 – Matti Caspi, Israeli singer-songwriter (died 2026)
- 1950 – Patricia Ann Tracey, American Naval Vice Admiral
- 1950 – Paul Westphal, American basketball player and coach (died 2021)
- 1951 – Daniel Petrie, Jr., American director, producer, and screenwriter
- 1952 – Semyon Bychkov, Russian-American conductor
- 1952 – Mandy Patinkin, American actor and singer
- 1953 – Shuggie Otis, American singer-songwriter and musician
- 1953 – June Pointer, American singer and actress (died 2006)
- 1953 – David Sancious, American rock and jazz keyboard player and guitarist
- 1954 – Wayne Bartholomew, Australian surfer
- 1954 – Lawrence Summers, American economist and academic
- 1955 – Michael Beschloss, American historian and author
- 1955 – Richard Burr, American businessman, academic, and politician
- 1955 – Kevin Conroy, American actor (died 2022)
- 1955 – Andy Gray, Scottish footballer and sportscaster
- 1955 – Billy Idol, English singer-songwriter, guitarist, and actor
- 1957 – John Ashton, English guitarist, songwriter, and producer
- 1957 – Richard Barbieri, English keyboard player and songwriter
- 1957 – Robert Alan Beuth; American actor, playwright, and sculptor
- 1957 – Joël Champetier, Canadian author and screenwriter (died 2015)
- 1957 – Thomas McElwee, Irish Republican died on hunger strike (died 1981)
- 1957 – Patrick McLoughlin, English miner and politician, Secretary of State for Transport
- 1957 – Colin Mochrie, Scottish-Canadian comedian, actor, producer, and screenwriter
- 1957 – Margaret Spellings, American educator and politician, 8th United States Secretary of Education
- 1958 – Stacey Q, American pop singer-songwriter, dancer and actress
- 1959 – Cherie Currie, American singer-songwriter, musician, and actress
- 1959 – Lorraine Kelly, Scottish journalist and actress
- 1959 – Hugo Swire, English soldier and politician, Minister of State for Foreign Affairs
- 1960 – Bill Halter, American scholar, activist, and politician, 14th Lieutenant Governor of Arkansas
- 1960 – Gary Lineker, English footballer and sportscaster
- 1960 – Michael O'Connor, Australian rugby player
- 1960 – Bob Tewksbury, American baseball player and coach
- 1960 – Ron Simons, American theatre producer and actor (died 2024)
- 1961 – Innocent Egbunike, Nigerian sprinter and coach
- 1961 – Ian Morris, Trinidadian footballer and sprinter
- 1962 – Jimmy Del Ray, American wrestler and manager (died 2014)
- 1962 – Bo Jackson, American football and baseball player
- 1962 – Daniel Keys Moran, American computer programmer and author
- 1964 – Jushin Thunder Liger, Japanese wrestler and mixed martial artist
- 1965 – Aldair, Brazilian footballer
- 1965 – Fumihito, Prince Akishino, Japanese royal (younger brother of Emperor Naruhito and first in line to the Chrysanthemum Throne)
- 1965 – David Laws, English banker and politician, Chief Secretary to the Treasury
- 1965 – Ben Stiller, American actor, director, producer and screenwriter
- 1966 – Nigel Adams, English businessman and politician
- 1966 – David Berkoff, American swimmer
- 1966 – John Bishop, English comedian, presenter, and actor
- 1966 – Philippe Bozon, French ice hockey player
- 1966 – David Nicholls, English author and screenwriter
- 1966 – Mika Salo, Finnish racing driver
- 1967 – Joseph Corré, English fashion designer and businessman, co-founded Agent Provocateur
- 1967 – Rajiv Dixit, Indian author and activist (died 2010)
- 1967 – Richard Harry, Australian rugby player
- 1968 – Des'ree, English R&B singer-songwriter
- 1968 – Laurent Jalabert, French cyclist and sportscaster
- 1969 – Marc Forster, German-Swiss director, producer, and screenwriter
- 1969 – Marc Goossens, Belgian racing driver
- 1969 – Chris Weitz, American actor, director, producer, and screenwriter
- 1970 – Phil Babb, English footballer and manager
- 1970 – Walter Emanuel Jones, American actor and dancer
- 1970 – Natalie Williams, American basketball player and executive
- 1971 – Ray Durham, American baseball player
- 1972 – Christophe Beck, Canadian television and film score composer and conductor
- 1972 – Dan Jarvis, English soldier and politician
- 1972 – Stanislav Kitto, Estonian footballer
- 1972 – Abel Xavier, Portuguese footballer and manager
- 1973 – Christian Cage, Canadian wrestler, actor, and podcaster
- 1975 – Mark Blount, American basketball player
- 1975 – Mindy McCready, American singer-songwriter (died 2013)
- 1975 – Ben Thatcher, English footballer
- 1976 – Marta Burgay, Italian astronomer
- 1976 – Marco Castro, Peruvian-American director and cinematographer
- 1976 – Andres Lacson, Filipino politician
- 1976 – Josh Lewsey, English rugby player
- 1976 – Paul Nuttall, British politician
- 1977 – Richard Elias Anderson, Canadian basketball player and coach
- 1977 – Steve Aoki, American DJ and producer, founded Dim Mak Records
- 1977 – Iván Guerrero, Honduran footballer and manager
- 1977 – Kazumi Saito, Japanese baseball player and coach
- 1977 – Olivier Schoenfelder, French ice dancer and coach
- 1978 – Clay Aiken, American singer
- 1978 – Gael García Bernal, Mexican actor and producer
- 1978 – Benjamin Lense, German footballer
- 1979 – Chris Atkinson, Australian racing driver
- 1979 – Andrés Nocioni, Italian-Argentine basketball player
- 1980 – Cem Adrian, Turkish singer-songwriter, producer, and director
- 1980 – Jamie Ashdown, English footballer
- 1980 – Shane Victorino, American baseball player
- 1981 – Rich Harden, Canadian baseball player
- 1982 – Elisha Cuthbert, Canadian actress
- 1982 – Jason Pominville, Canadian-American ice hockey player
- 1983 – Adrian Cristea, Romanian footballer
- 1983 – Vladislav Polyakov, Kazakhstani swimmer
- 1984 – Nigel de Jong, Dutch footballer
- 1984 – Alan Hutton, Scottish footballer
- 1984 – Olga Rypakova, Kazakhstani triple jumper
- 1984 – Francisco Sandaza, Spanish footballer
- 1985 – Kaley Cuoco, American actress
- 1985 – Hikari Mitsushima, Japanese actress and singer
- 1985 – Chrissy Teigen, American model
- 1985 – Luis Valbuena, Venezuelan baseball player (died 2018)
- 1986 – Jordan Farmar, American basketball player
- 1986 – Evgenia Linetskaya, Israeli tennis player
- 1987 – Vasilisa Bardina, Russian tennis player
- 1987 – Christel Khalil, American actress
- 1987 – Naomi, American wrestler, model, and dancer
- 1987 – Daniel Noboa, Politician and businessman, President of Ecuador
- 1987 – Dougie Poynter, English singer-songwriter and bass player
- 1988 – Phillip Hughes, Australian cricketer (died 2014)
- 1988 – Vitaliy Polyanskyi, Ukrainian footballer
- 1988 – Rebecca Rittenhouse, American actress
- 1988 – Tomi Saarelma, Finnish footballer
- 1989 – Adelaide Clemens, Australian actress
- 1989 – Vladimír Weiss, Slovak footballer
- 1990 – Magnus Carlsen, Norwegian chess player
- 1990 – Antoine N'Gossan, Ivorian footballer
- 1991 – Agnatius Paasi, Tongan rugby league player
- 1994 – Sofia Araújo, Portuguese tennis player
- 1994 – Marko Daňo, Austrian-Slovak ice hockey player
- 1995 – Lancey Foux, British rapper and singer
- 1998 – Grant Williams, American basketball player
- 2000 – Jane Paknia, American musician

== Deaths ==
=== Pre-1600 ===
- 1016 – Edmund Ironside, English king (born 993)
- 1204 – Emeric, King of Hungary
- 1276 – Kanezawa Sanetoki, Japanese member of the Hōjō clan (born 1224)
- 1283 – John of Vercelli, Master General of the Dominican Order (born c. 1205)
- 1378 – Andrew Stratford, English verderer and landowner
- 1525 – Guillaume Crétin, French poet (born c. 1460)
- 1526 – Giovanni dalle Bande Nere, Italian captain (born 1498)
- 1580 – Richard Farrant, English playwright and composer (born 1530)
- 1600 – Nanda Bayin, Burmese king (born 1535)

=== 1601–1900 ===
- 1603 – William Gilbert, English scientist (born 1544)
- 1623 – Thomas Weelkes, English organist and composer (born 1576)
- 1647 – Bonaventura Cavalieri, Italian mathematician and astronomer (born 1598)
- 1647 – Giovanni Lanfranco, Italian painter (born 1582)
- 1654 – John Selden, English jurist and scholar (born 1584)
- 1675 – Cecil Calvert, 2nd Baron Baltimore, English lawyer and politician, Lieutenant Governor of Newfoundland (born 1605)
- 1694 – Marcello Malpighi, Italian physician and biologist (born 1628)
- 1703 – Nicolas de Grigny, French organist and composer (born 1672)
- 1718 – Charles XII of Sweden (born 1682)
- 1760 – Friederike Caroline Neuber, German actress (born 1697)
- 1761 – John Dollond, English optician and astronomer (born 1706)
- 1765 – George Glas, Scottish merchant and explorer (born 1725)
- 1863 – Kamehameha IV, Hawaiian King (born 1834)
- 1864 – Patrick Cleburne, Irish-American general (born 1828)
- 1892 – Dimitrios Valvis, Greek judge and politician, 69th Prime Minister of Greece (born 1814)
- 1900 – Oscar Wilde, Irish playwright, novelist, and poet (born 1854)

=== 1901–present ===
- 1901 – Edward John Eyre, English explorer and politician, Governor of Jamaica (born 1815)
- 1907 – Ludwig Levy, German architect (born 1854)
- 1908 – Nishinoumi Kajirō I, Japanese sumo wrestler, the 16th Yokozuna (born 1855)
- 1920 – Vladimir May-Mayevsky, Russian general (born 1867)
- 1923 – John Maclean, Scottish educator and revolutionary socialist activist (born 1879)
- 1930 – Ponnambalam Ramanathan, Sri Lankan lawyer and politician, 3rd Solicitor General of Sri Lanka (born 1851)
- 1930 – Mary Harris Jones, American Labor organizer (born 1837)
- 1931 – Henry Walters, American art collector and philanthropist (born 1848)
- 1933 – Arthur Currie, Canadian general (born 1875)
- 1934 – Hélène Boucher, French pilot (born 1908)
- 1935 – Fernando Pessoa, Portuguese poet, philosopher, and critic (born 1888)
- 1942 – Anthony M. Rud, American journalist and author (born 1893)
- 1943 – Etty Hillesum, Dutch author (born 1914)
- 1944 – Paul Masson, French cyclist (born 1876)
- 1949 – Frank Cooper, Australian politician, 25th Premier of Queensland (born 1872)
- 1953 – Francis Picabia, French painter and poet (born 1879)
- 1954 – Wilhelm Furtwängler, German conductor and composer (born 1886)
- 1955 – Josip Štolcer-Slavenski, Croatian composer and educator (born 1896)
- 1958 – Hubert Wilkins, Australian pilot, ornithologist, geographer, and explorer (born 1888)
- 1966 – Salah Suheimat, Jordanian lawyer and politician (born 1914)
- 1967 – Patrick Kavanagh, Irish poet and author (born 1904)
- 1972 – Compton Mackenzie, English-Scottish actor, author, and academic (born 1883)
- 1977 – Terence Rattigan, English playwright and screenwriter (born 1911)
- 1979 – Laura Gilpin, American photographer (born 1891)
- 1979 – Zeppo Marx, American actor and comedian (born 1901)
- 1987 – Simon Carmiggelt, Dutch journalist and author (born 1913)
- 1988 – Pannonica de Koenigswarter, English-American singer-songwriter (born 1913)
- 1989 – Ahmadou Ahidjo, Cameroonian lawyer and politician, 1st President of Cameroon (born 1924)
- 1989 – Alfred Herrhausen, German banker (born 1930)
- 1990 – Fritz Eichenberg, German-American illustrator and arts educator (born 1901)
- 1992 – Peter Blume, American painter and sculptor (born 1906)
- 1993 – David Houston, American singer-songwriter (born 1938)
- 1994 – Guy Debord, French theorist and author (born 1931)
- 1994 – Lionel Stander, American actor (born 1908)
- 1995 – Til Kiwe, German actor and screenwriter (born 1910)
- 1996 – Tiny Tim, American singer and ukulele player (born 1932)
- 1997 – Kathy Acker, American author, poet, and playwright (born 1947)
- 1998 – Janet Lewis, American novelist and poet (born 1899)
- 1998 – Margaret Walker, American author and poet (born 1915)
- 2000 – Eloise Jarvis McGraw, American author (born 1915)
- 2000 – Scott Smith, Canadian bass player (born 1955)
- 2003 – Gertrude Ederle, American swimmer (born 1905)
- 2004 – Pierre Berton, Canadian journalist and author (born 1920)
- 2004 – Seungsahn, South Korean spiritual leader, founded the Kwan Um School of Zen (born 1927)
- 2005 – Jean Parker, American actress (born 1915)
- 2006 – Elhadi Adam, Sudanese poet and songwriter (born 1927)
- 2006 – Rafael Buenaventura, Filipino banker (born 1938)
- 2006 – Shirley Walker, American composer and conductor (born 1945)
- 2007 – Engin Arık, Turkish physicist and academic (born 1948)
- 2007 – Evel Knievel, American motorcycle rider and stuntman (born 1938)
- 2008 – Munetaka Higuchi, Japanese drummer and producer (born 1958)
- 2010 – Rajiv Dixit, Indian author and activist (born 1967)
- 2010 – Garry Gross, American photographer (born 1937)
- 2012 – Rogelio Álvarez, Cuban-American baseball player (born 1938)
- 2012 – I. K. Gujral, Indian lawyer and politician, 12th Prime Minister of India (born 1919)
- 2012 – Munir Malik, Pakistani cricketer (born 1931)
- 2012 – Susil Moonesinghe, Sri Lankan lawyer and politician, 4th Chief Minister of Western Province (born 1930)
- 2012 – Merv Pregulman, American football player and businessman (born 1922)
- 2012 – Homer R. Warner, American cardiologist and academic (born 1922)
- 2012 – Mitchell Cole, English footballer (born 1985)
- 2013 – Paul Crouch, American broadcaster, co-founded Trinity Broadcasting Network (born 1934)
- 2013 – Jean Kent, English actress (born 1921)
- 2013 – Tabu Ley Rochereau, Congolese-Belgian singer-songwriter (born 1937)
- 2013 – Doriano Romboni, Italian motorcycle racer (born 1968)
- 2013 – Paul Walker, American actor (born 1973)
- 2014 – Qayyum Chowdhury, Bangladeshi painter and academic (born 1932)
- 2014 – Jarbom Gamlin, Indian lawyer and politician, 7th Chief Minister of Arunachal Pradesh (born 1961)
- 2014 – Martin Litton, American rafter and environmentalist (born 1917)
- 2014 – Anthony Dryden Marshall, American CIA officer and diplomat (born 1924)
- 2014 – Go Seigen, Chinese-Japanese Go player (born 1914)
- 2014 – Kent Haruf, American novelist (born 1943)
- 2015 – Pío Caro Baroja, Spanish director and screenwriter (born 1928)
- 2015 – Minas Hatzisavvas, Greek actor and screenwriter (born 1948)
- 2015 – Marcus Klingberg, Polish-Israeli physician and biologist (born 1918)
- 2015 – Fatema Mernissi, Moroccan sociologist and author (born 1940)
- 2015 – Shigeru Mizuki, Japanese author and illustrator (born 1922)
- 2015 – Eldar Ryazanov, Russian director and screenwriter (born 1927)
- 2015 – Nigel Buxton, British travel writer and wine critic (born 1924)
- 2017 – Jim Nabors, American actor and comedian (born 1930)
- 2017 – Surin Pitsuwan, Thai politician and diplomat (born 1949)
- 2017 – Marina Popovich, Soviet pilot, engineer and military officer (born 1931)
- 2017 – Alfie Curtis, British actor (born 1930)
- 2018 – George H. W. Bush, American politician, 41st President of the United States and 43rd Vice President of the United States (born 1924)
- 2020 – Irina Antonova, Russian art historian (born 1922)
- 2022 – Jiang Zemin, Chinese politician, former General Secretary of the Chinese Communist Party (paramount leader) and President of China (born 1926)
- 2022 – Christine McVie, English singer-songwriter and keyboard player (born 1943)
- 2023 – Alistair Darling, British Politician and Chancellor of the Exchequer (born 1953)
- 2023 – Shane MacGowan, Irish singer-songwriter and frontman of The Pogues (born 1957)
- 2024 – Lou Carnesecca, American basketball player and coach (born 1925)

== Holidays and observances ==
- Bonifacio Day (Philippines)
- Christian feast day:
  - Andrew and its related observances.
  - Joseph Marchand (one of Vietnamese Martyrs)
  - Cuthbert Mayne
  - Thaddeus Liu
  - November 30 (Eastern Orthodox liturgics)
- Commemoration Day (United Arab Emirates)
- Day to Mark the Departure and Expulsion of Jews from the Arab Countries and Iran (Israel)
- Independence Day, celebrates the independence of Barbados from the United Kingdom in 1966
- National Day (Benin)
- Regina Mundi Day (South Africa)
- Saint Andrew's Day (Scotland)
- Day of Remembrance for All Victims of Chemical Warfare (United Nations)
