= Zagrosjet =

Airline in Erbil, Kurdistan Region, Iraq

Zagrosjet زاگرۆس جێت
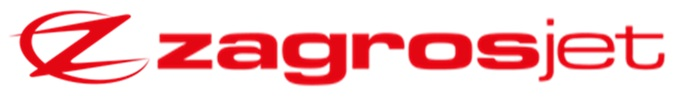
IATA	ICAO	Call sign
Z4	GZQ	ZAGROSJET
- Founded: October 2005 (as Zagros Air)
- Ceased operations: March 2018
- Operating bases: Erbil
- Fleet size: 4
- Destinations: 7
- Headquarters: Erbil, Kurdistan Region
- Website: zagrosjet.com

Zagrosjet was an airline headquartered in Erbil, capital of the Kurdistan Region, Iraq, which operated scheduled and chartered international passenger and cargo flights. The airline suspended all flight operations due to blockade on Erbil International Airport post 2017 Kurdistan Region independence referendum period.

== History ==
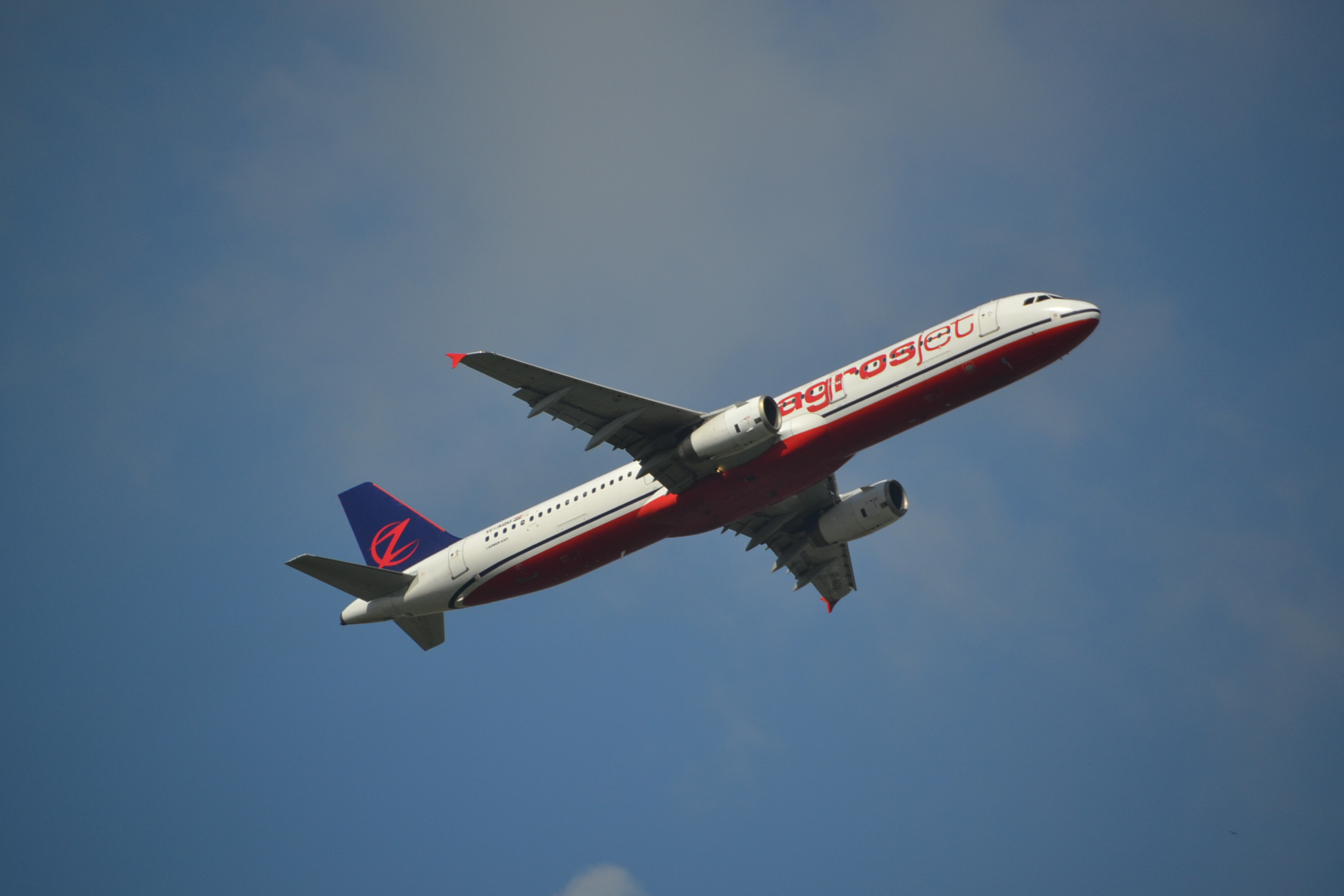
Zagrosjet Airbus A321-200

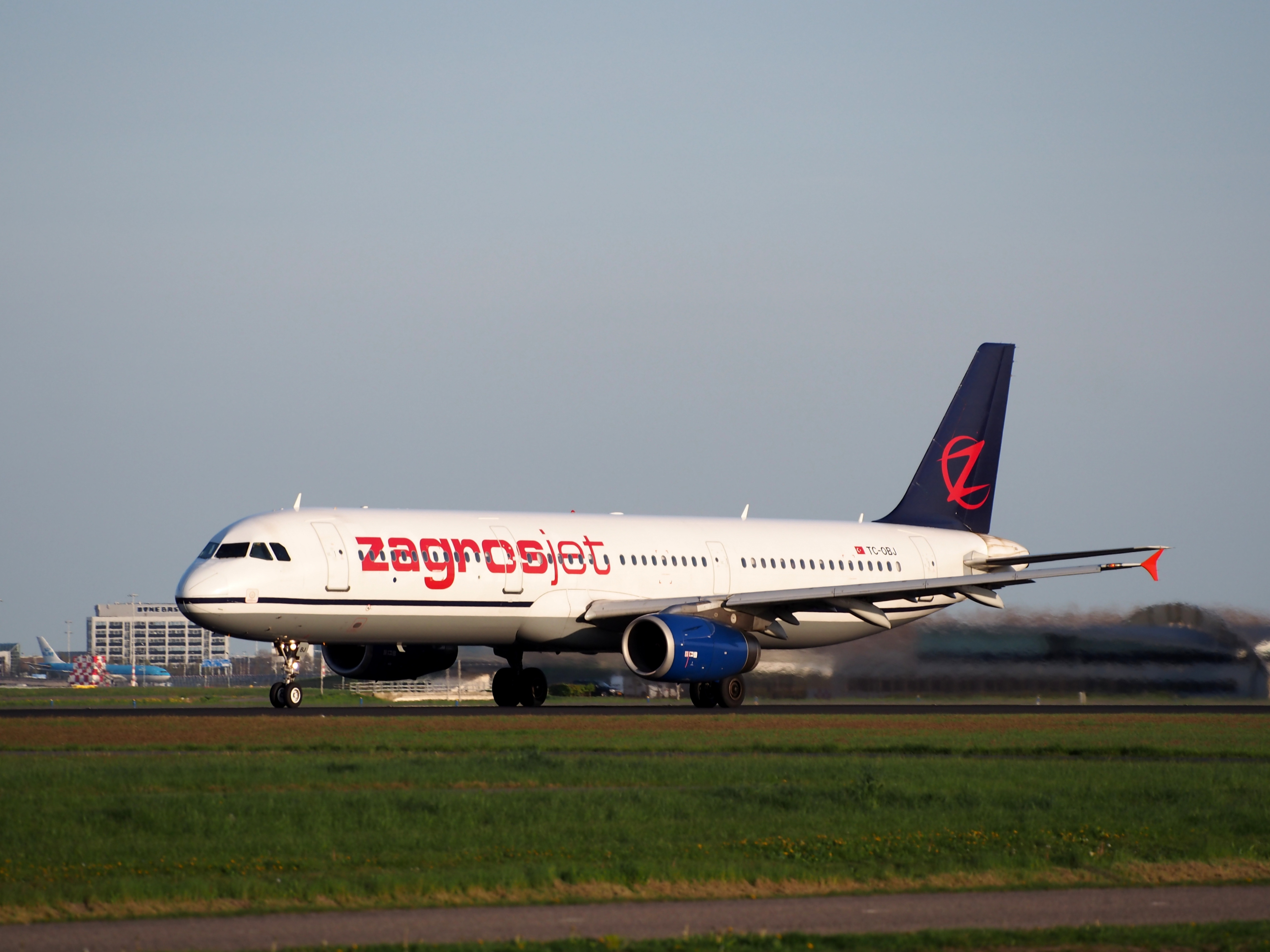
A Zagrosjet Airbus A321-200 taxiing at Amsterdam Airport Schiphol, Netherlands in 2015.

The Airline takes its name from the Zagros Mountains. Zagrosjet was established in October 2005 by Zagros Group under the name Zagros Air. It was licensed as an Air Carrier by Ministry of Transportation – Iraq in June 2013 to perform scheduled and unscheduled flights for passenger and cargo. In August 2013 the airline changed its name to Zagrosjet to avoid confusion with Zagros Airlines of Iran. Zagrosjet launched its flight operations in 2013 with a network covering Middle East destinations, Europe and Turkey.

== Destinations ==
As of February 2016 Zagrosjet offers scheduled flights to the following destinations:

Country	City	Airport	Notes
Azerbaijan	Baku	Heydar Aliyev International Airport	
Iraq	Baghdad	Baghdad International Airport	
Iraq	Erbil	Erbil International Airport	Hub
Norway	Oslo	Oslo Airport	
Netherlands	Amsterdam	Amsterdam Airport Schiphol	
Turkey	Ankara	Esenboğa International Airport	
Turkey	Istanbul	Atatürk International Airport	

== Fleet ==
Zagrosjet operated the following aircraft during operations (as of July 2021):

Zagrosjet Fleet
Aircraft	Total	Notes
Airbus A320-200	2	1 leased from Atlasjet; 1 operated by Atlasjet Ukraine
Airbus A321-200	2	1 leased from Onur Air
Total	4	
