= World Focus (disambiguation) =

World Focus, or Worldfocus, is an American newscast.

World Focus or Worldfocus may also refer to:

- Ankair, an airline
- A British newscast by Independent Television News
