= Ankair =

Turkish charter airline

| IATA | ICAO | Call sign |
|---|---|---|
| - | VVF | WORLDFOCUS |
- Founded: 2005
- Ceased operations: 2008
- Hubs: Istanbul Airport
- Fleet size: 2
- Parent company: Dünyaya Bakış Hava Taşımacılığı A.Ş.
- Headquarters: Istanbul, Turkey
- Key people: Yavuz Cizmeci
- Website: http://www.ankair.com/

Anka Air, stylised as Ankair, was a charter airline headquartered in Istanbul, Turkey, and based at Atatürk Airport. Founded in 2005 as World Focus Airlines, the company changed its corporate image to its current form in February 2008 as a result of publicity surrounding the crash of Atlasjet Flight 4203 on 30 November 2007.

The airline operated charter flights to Europe and the Middle East.

== History ==
World Focus Airlines logo

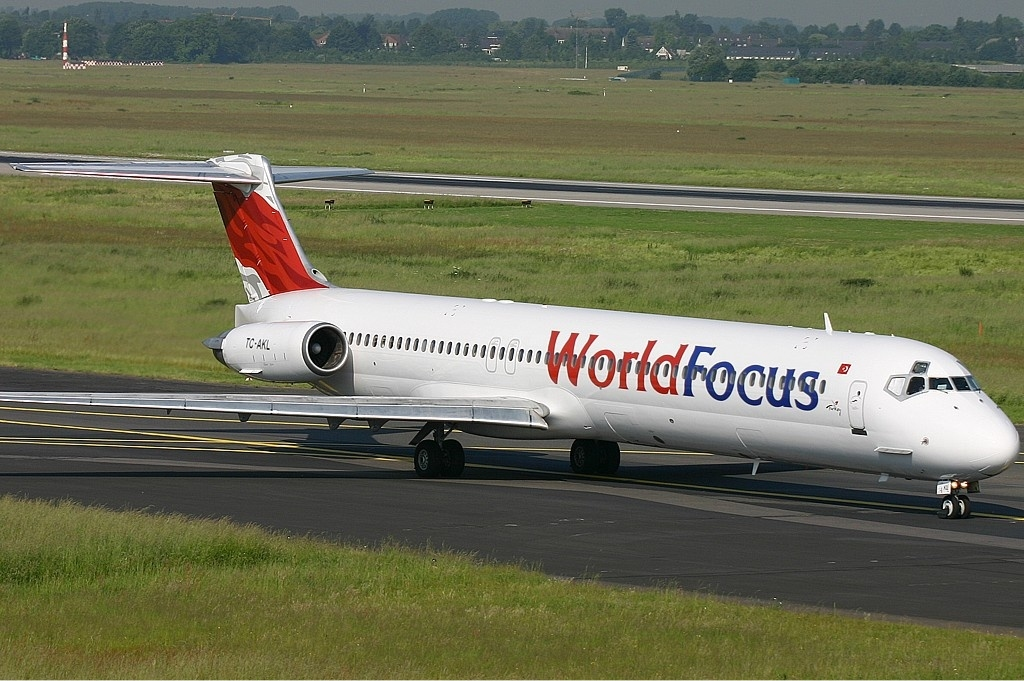
World Focus Airlines McDonnell Douglas MD-83

The airline was established as World Focus Airlines on 27 September 2005, beginning operations with two Airbus A310 aircraft. Due to negative publicity after the crash of Atlasjet Flight 4203 on 30 November 2007, which was operated by World Focus Airlines, the company changed its name to Anka Air and branding to Ankair in February 2008. Anka is in reference to the Turkish word for phoenix, anka kuşu.

== Accidents and incidents ==
- An MD-83 which the company leased to and operated for AtlasJet crashed on 30 November 2007 shortly before landing at Süleyman Demirel Airport in Isparta. The crash of Atlasjet Flight 4203 killed all 57 people on board. The cause of the accident is still undetermined.

== Suspension of operations ==
In July 2008, the airline was forced to suspend operations after it lost its operating certificate. Turkish aviation regulations require a minimum of three aircraft per carrier to retain an air operator certificate and Ankair only operated two MD-83s.

== Fleet ==
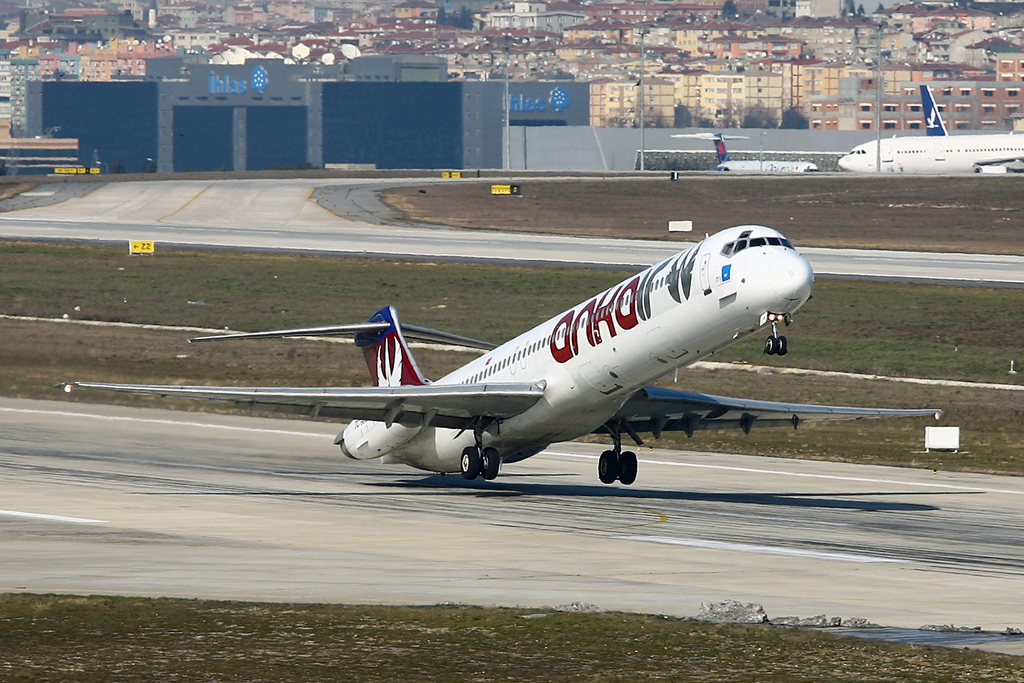
Ankair McDonnell Douglas MD-83 tail-striking/taking off at Atatürk International Airport (February 2008)

Ankair's fleet consisted of:

- 2 McDonnell Douglas MD-83
- 1 Boeing 747-200 (leased from Iran Air Cargo)
