= Osman Pasha (naval officer) =

Ottoman Navy vice-admiral

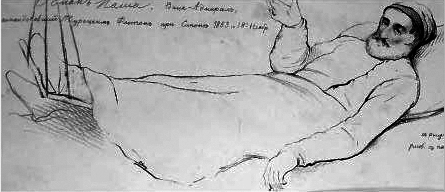
Osman Pasha as POW (with wounded foot) in Russian captivity in Sevastopol (1854)

Patrona (Vice Admiral) Osman Pasha (c. 1792; – c. 1860) was an Ottoman naval officer who led Ottoman forces in the Battle of Sinop and became a prisoner of war until being released in 1855.

== Biography ==
He was born in Rize. Osman started his career in the Egyptian Navy. He commanded a brig in the Battle of Navarino (1827) and an Egyptian frigate after 1830. During the Egyptian–Ottoman War (1839–41) he joined the Ottoman Navy, commanded an Ottoman ship of line in the Bombardment of St. Acre (1840) and with regard to that he became Vice Admiral (Patrona).

When the Russo-Ottoman Crimean War started he was sent out with a small flotilla to bring troops and material to Batumi. Because of stormy weather he decided to stop and wait in Sinope, where he was attacked by Russian Admiral Pavel Nakhimov on November 30 of 1853. Osman's flotilla was destroyed, he himself was wounded in the foot and taken prisoner. He was released in 1855, and although the Patrona rank had been abolished in the meantime, he remained a member of the Admiralty.

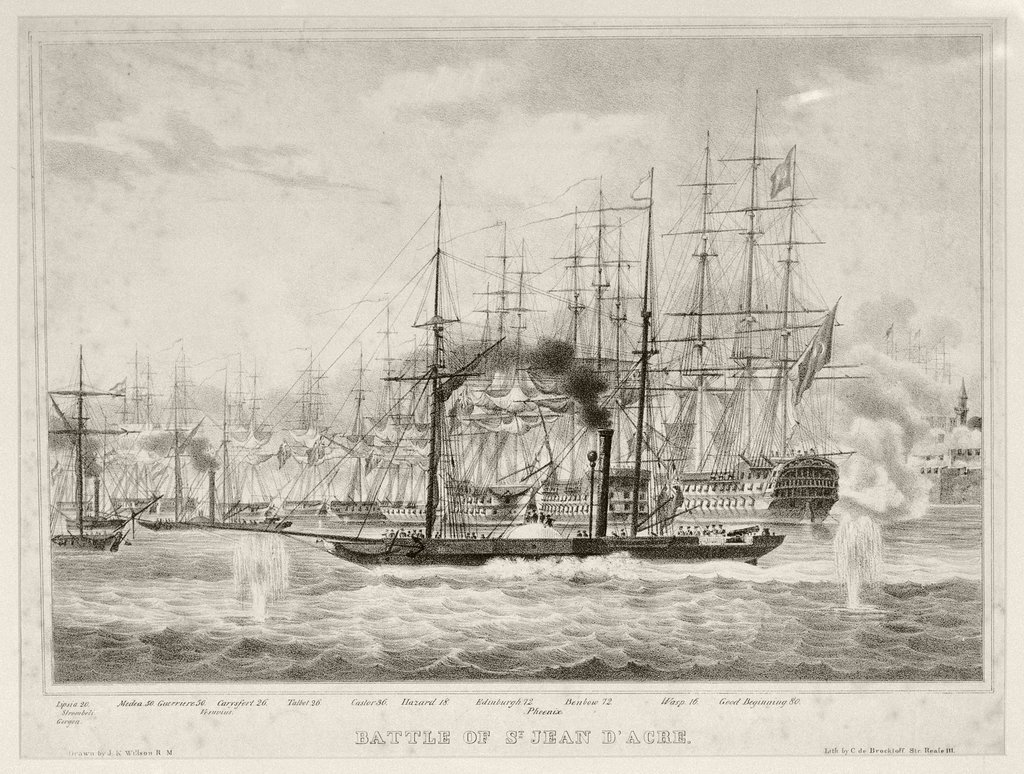
Ottoman ship of line (in the background) during the Bombardment of Acre (1840)

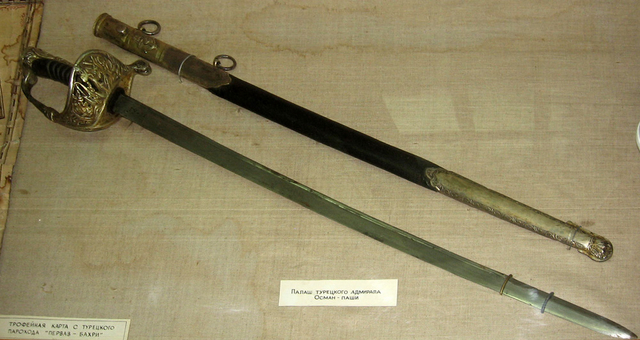
Osman Pasha's sabre remained in Russian hands after the Battle of Sinop (1853)
