= AtlasGlobal =

Turkish airline (2001–2020)

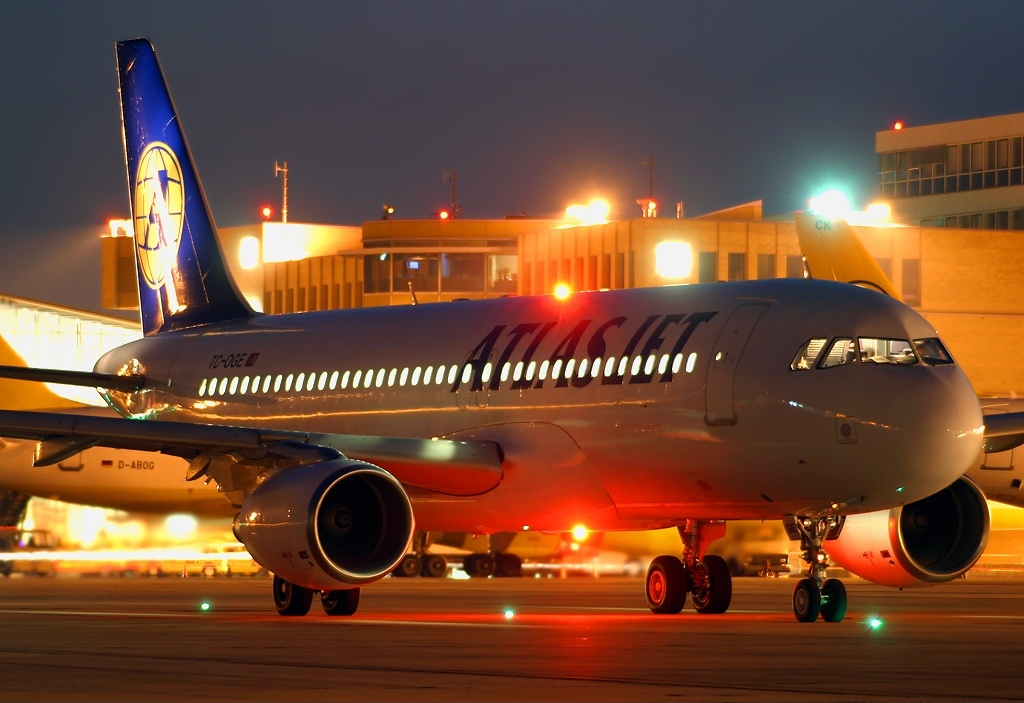
IATA	ICAO	Call sign
KK	KKK	ATLASGLOBAL
- Founded: 2001; 25 years ago
- Ceased operations: 12 February 2020
- Operating bases: Istanbul Airport
- Secondary hubs: Antalya Airport
- Frequent-flyer program: Atlasmiles
- Subsidiaries: Atlasholidays; AtlasGlobal Ukraine
- Fleet size: 2 (time of closure)
- Destinations: 12 (time of closure)
- Headquarters: Istanbul, Turkey
- Key people: Ali Murat Ersoy (Chairman); Sermed Temizkan (CEO)
- Website: www.atlasglbs.com

AtlasGlobal, named Atlasjet until 31 March 2015, was a Turkish airline headquartered in Istanbul, which operated scheduled domestic and international passenger services as well as charter flights, mostly out of its base at Istanbul Airport. The airline filed for bankruptcy on 12 February 2020, and ceased operations permanently after that date.

== History ==
=== Early years ===
The airline was established on 14 March 2001 and started operations on 1 June 2001. Formerly known as Atlasjet International Airlines, it was set up as a subsidiary of Öger Holdings. As of 1 February 2006, Öger's 45% share at Atlasglobal was taken over and Ali Murat Ersoy became the president of the board of directors at Atlasglobal. The company is led by its CEO Sermed Temizkanhad 730 employees (as of 2017).

In August 2012, AtlasGlobal Airlines contracted Ryan International Airlines, a US airline, to operate religious pilgrimage flights to cities such as Medina and Tel Aviv. In January 2013, AtlasGlobal failed to fulfill the payments to Ryan International, which prompted the termination of the co-operation without advance notice. Ryan International Airlines, already in a bankruptcy reorganization process, was not able to recover from the loss and therefore faced impending financial difficulties, which led to its liquidation.

=== Operational issues and end of operations ===
On 26 November 2019, AtlasGlobal announced a temporary suspension of all flights due to a restructuring of the airline. It was further announced that all ticket sales would be suspended until 16 December 2019 with flights planned to resume by 21 December.

On 16 December 2019, Atlasglobal resumed scheduled flight operations, five days ahead of its previously announced return. Throughout the suspension it had maintained charter services, with two A321s serving domestic Turkish destinations as well Tehran and Baghdad. In a statement to the Saba news agency, Atlasglobal said its revised business plan will see it focus more on charters as opposed to scheduled flights. It did not disclose which routes would be dropped as part of the adjustment.

On 7 January 2020, the airline announced it would be suspending operations again, until 9 February 2020. On 29 January 2020, it has been announced that AtlasGlobal returned their sole two Airbus A330-200s to their lessors. On 12 February 2020, Atlasglobal filed for bankruptcy and halted its operations immediately.

== Destinations ==
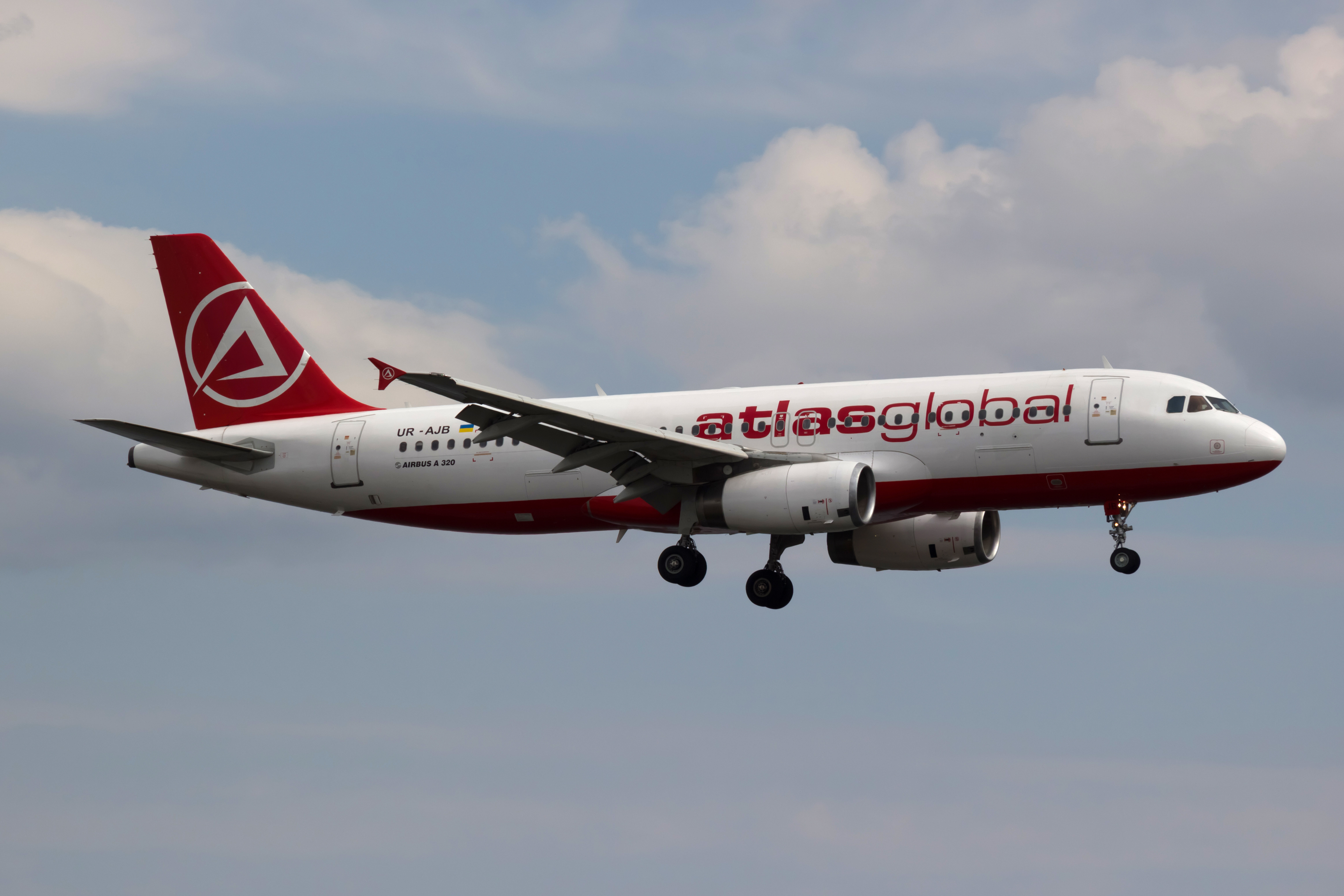
AtlasGlobal Airbus A320-200 wearing an older livery

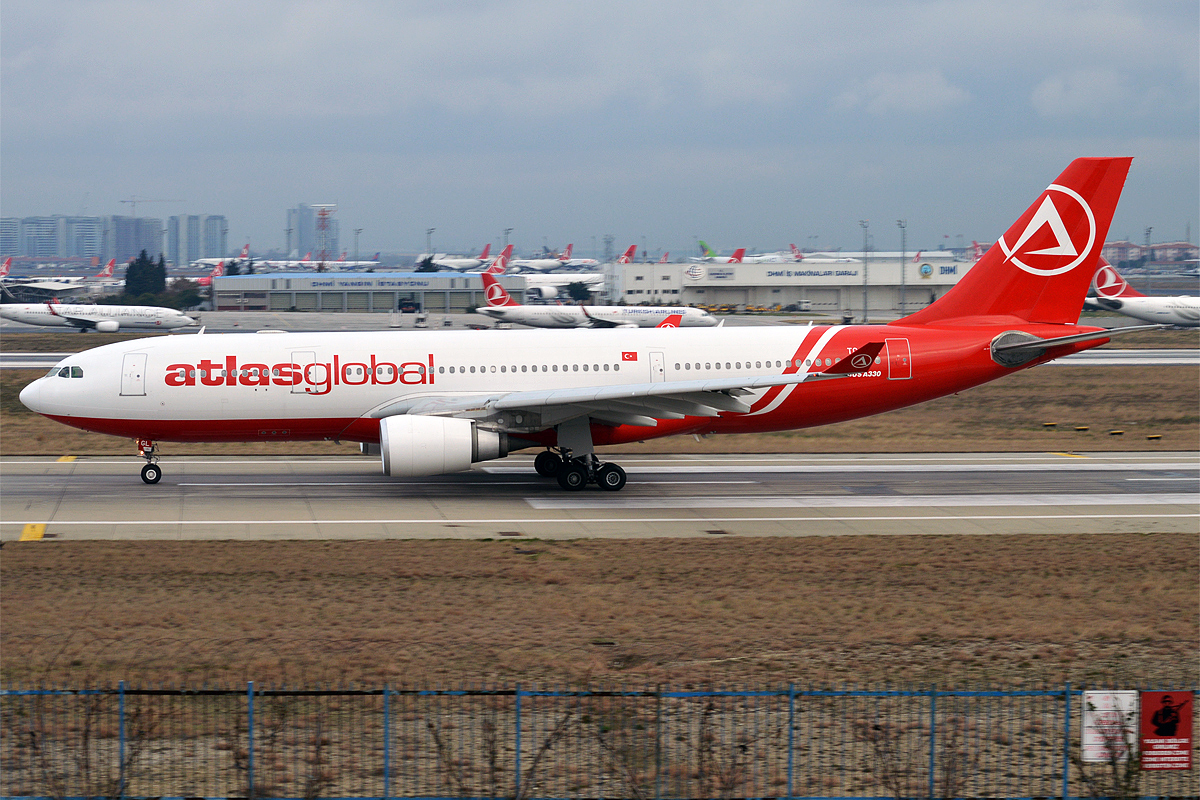
A former AtlasGlobal Airbus A330-200 at the airline's former home base, Istanbul Atatürk Airport

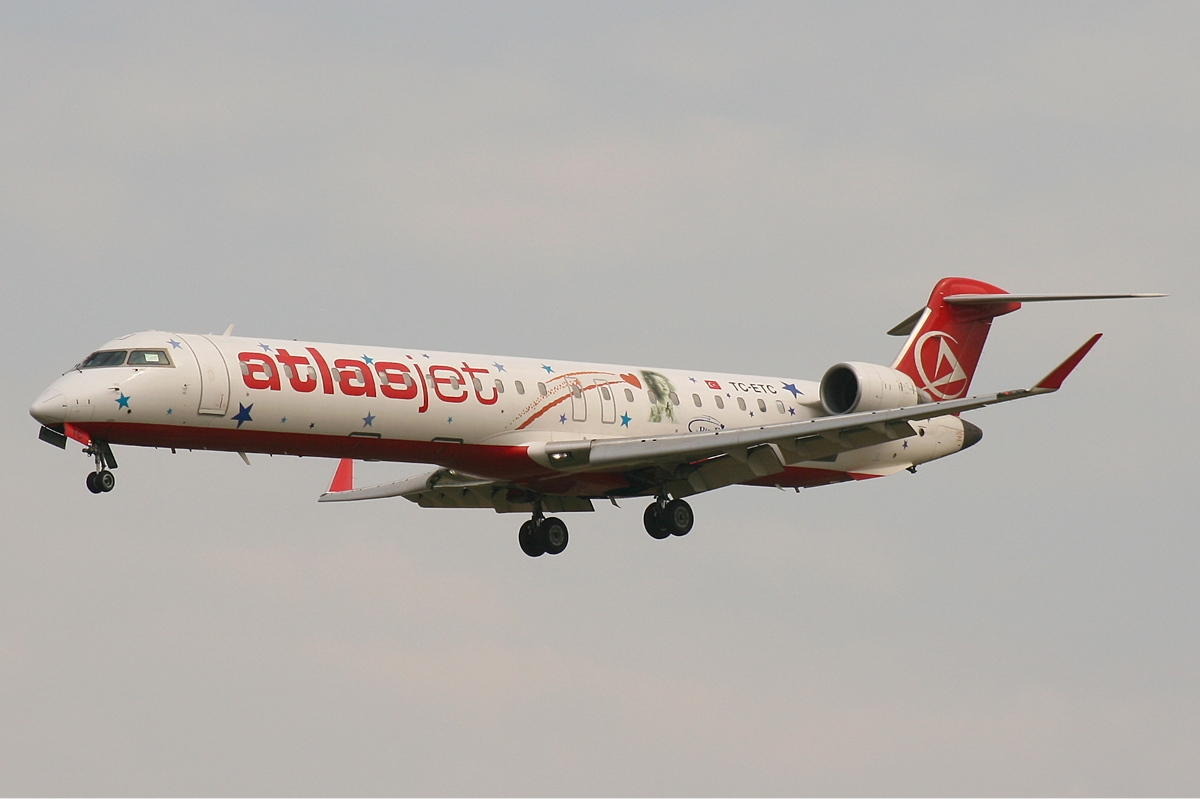
A former Atlasjet Bombardier CRJ900 which has been retired in 2010

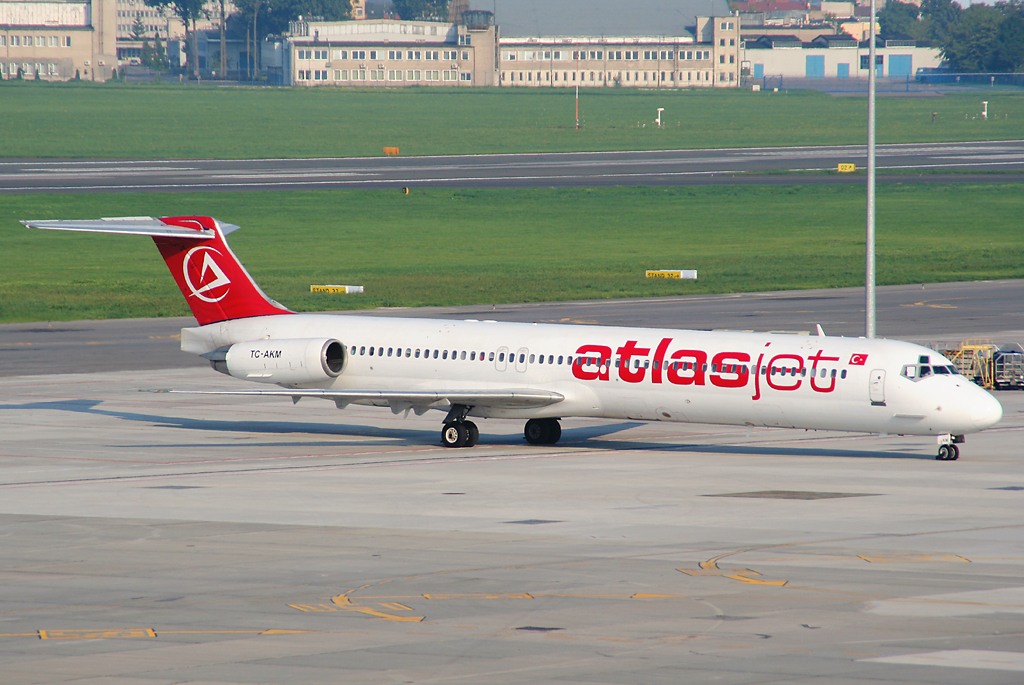
TC-AKM, the McDonnell Douglas MD-83 destroyed in the accident of Atlasjet Flight 4203 in 2007

As of 19 January 2020, before suspending all flights, AtlasGlobal offered scheduled flights (excluding charter flights) to the following destinations:

Country	City	Airport	Notes	Refs
France	Paris	Charles de Gaulle Airport		
Georgia	Tbilisi	Tbilisi International Airport		
Iran	Tehran	Tehran Imam Khomeini International Airport		
Iraq	Baghdad	Baghdad International Airport		
Iraq	Sulaimaniyah	Sulaimaniyah International Airport		
Armenia	Yerevan	Zvartnots International Airport		
Israel	Tel Aviv	Ben Gurion Airport		
Lebanon	Beirut	Beirut–Rafic Hariri International Airport		
Netherlands	Amsterdam	Amsterdam Airport Schiphol		
North Cyprus	North Nicosia	Ercan International Airport		
Turkey	Antalya	Antalya Airport		
Turkey	Istanbul	Istanbul Airport	Hub	
United Kingdom	London	London Stansted Airport		

== Historic fleet ==
Over the years, the following aircraft types were operated:

Aircraft	Introduced	Retired
Airbus A330-200	2018	2019

== Accidents and incidents ==
- On 18 August 2007, Atlasjet Flight 1011 from Ercan, Northern Cyprus to Istanbul, Turkey, which was operated by a McDonnell Douglas MD-83 (registered TC-AKN), was hijacked by two passengers shortly after take-off. The perpetrators claimed to be members of Al Qaeda carrying explosives, and demanded the pilots divert the aircraft to Tehran, Iran. Instead, the aircraft landed at Antalya Airport in Turkey at 08:15 local time, officially in order to refuel. Negotiations with the local authorities began, during which all females and children on board were allowed to leave. A ruckus occurred when other passengers and crew tried to flee, during which the hijackers surrendered. There were no notable injuries among the 138 other passengers and 5 crew members on board.
- On 30 November 2007, Atlasjet Flight 4203 from Istanbul to Isparta crashed upon approaching Isparta Süleyman Demirel Airport, killing all 50 passengers and 7 crew members on board. The aircraft that operated this flight was wet-leased from World Focus Airlines.

== See also ==
- List of defunct airlines of Turkey
