= Patrona =

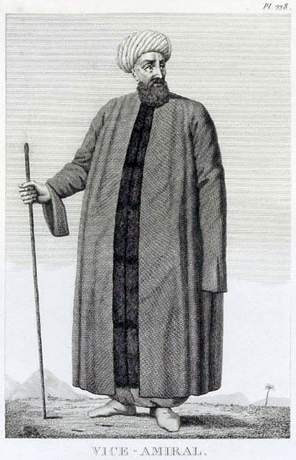
Vice Admiral (Patrona) of the Ottoman Empire, around 1800.

Patrona was a military rank of the Ottoman Navy equivalent to a Vice admiral or modern Turkish Tümamiral. The word Patrona was originally Italian as term for the Admiral's galley. The Ottoman Patrona was the second commander of the Ottoman fleet, junior to the Kapudan Pasha (Admiral).

The rank was used since 17th century but abolished in 1855 and replaced by Ferik Amiral.

The Patrona's flag was the red Ottoman flag (including white crescent and star) with a silver cannon on the red ground.

== Sources ==
- Ernst von Skork: Das Volk und Reich der Osmanen, in besonderer Darstellung ihrer Kriegsverfassung und Kriegswesens, p. 262ff. Friese, Pirna 1829
- First Encyclopaedia of Islam (1913–1936), Vol. VI, p. 1164. Brill, Leiden 1938/93
- Candan Badem: Ottoman Crimean War (1853 - 1856), p. 113. Brill, Leiden 2010
- A. Y. Al-Hassan: Science and Technology in Islam, p. 230. UNESCO, Beirut 2001
- Turkish Navy Homepage: Türk Denizci Kıyafet ve Unvanları
- Turkish Language Association: Patrona
