= Atlasjet Flight 4203 =

2007 aviation accident

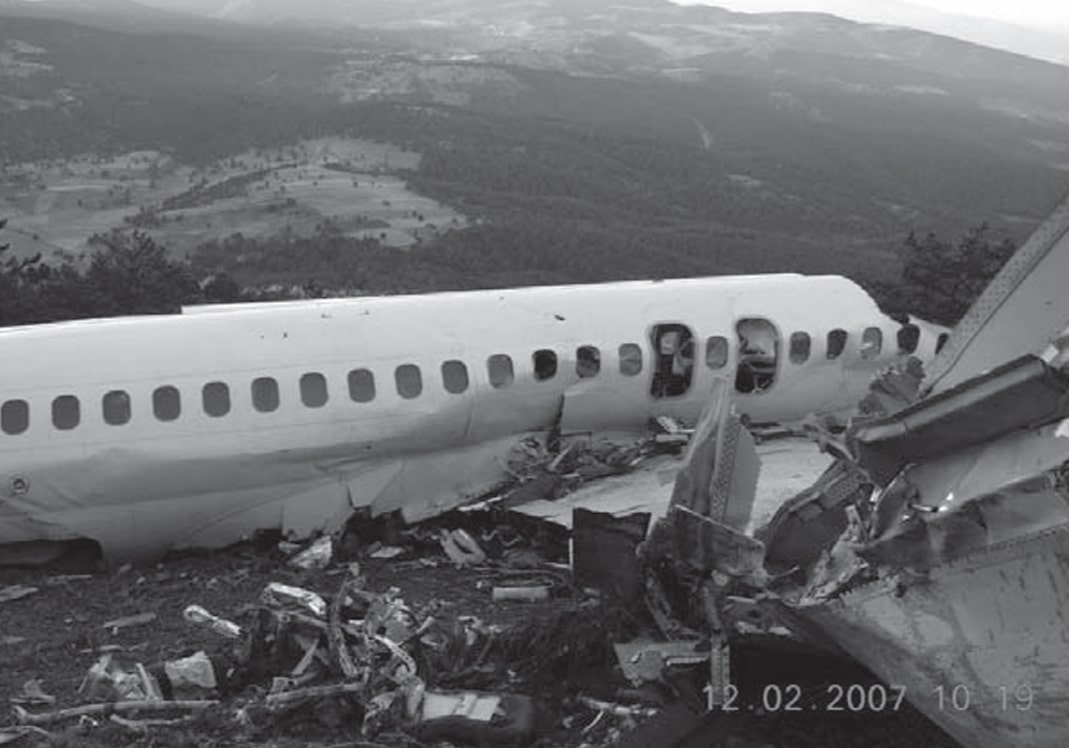
- Wreckage of the aircraft at the crash site

Accident
- Date: 30 November 2007
- Summary: Controlled flight into terrain due to pilot error
- Site: Türbetepe, Keçiborlu, Isparta Province, Turkey; 37°52′24″N 30°12′07″E

Aircraft
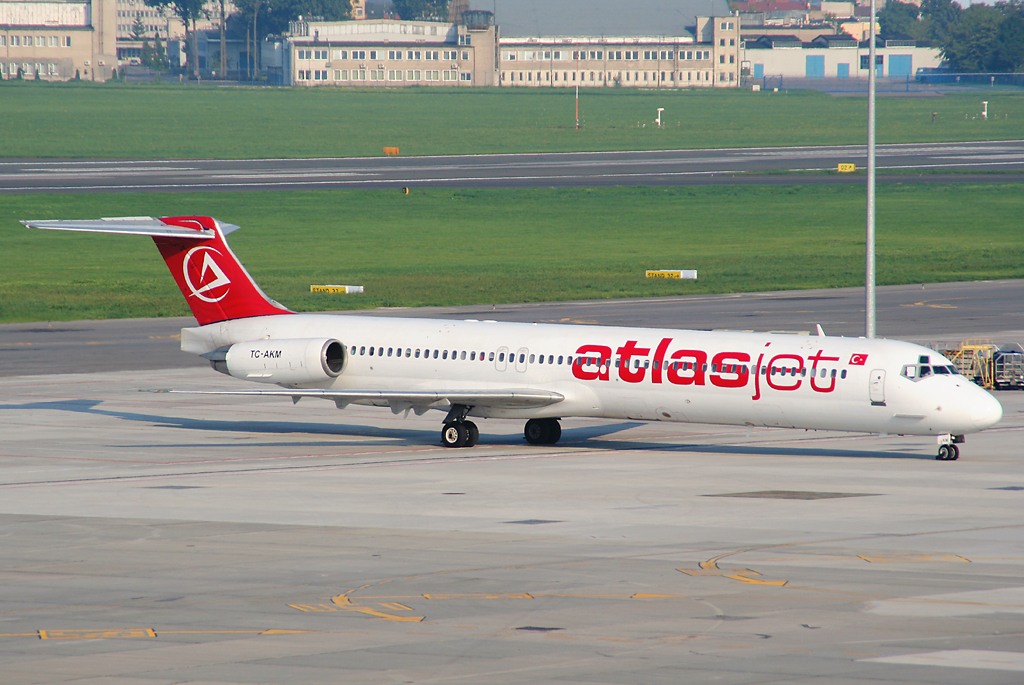
- TC-AKM, the aircraft involved in the accident, pictured in August 2007
- Aircraft type: McDonnell Douglas MD-83
- Operator: World Focus Airlines on behalf of Atlasjet
- IATA flight No.: KK4203
- ICAO flight No.: KKK4203
- Call sign: ATLASJET 4203
- Registration: TC-AKM
- Flight origin: Istanbul Atatürk Airport
- Destination: Isparta Süleyman Demirel Airport
- Occupants: 57
- Passengers: 50
- Crew: 7
- Fatalities: 57
- Survivors: 0

Location of departure (LTBA) and destination (LTFC) airports

Atlasjet Flight 4203 was a scheduled domestic passenger flight from Istanbul Atatürk Airport in Istanbul to Isparta Süleyman Demirel Airport in Isparta Province, Turkey. On 30 November 2007, the aircraft operating the flight – a McDonnell Douglas MD-83 which Atlasjet had leased from World Focus Airlines just five months before – crashed in the vicinity of Keçiborlu between the villages of Yenitepe and Çukurören while on approach, approximately 12 kilometres (7.5 mi) west of the destination airport. The flight had taken off from Istanbul at 00:51 EET with 50 passengers and 7 crew members on board. All 57 occupants perished in the accident.

== Background ==
=== Aircraft ===
The aircraft that operated flight 4203 was a McDonnell Douglas MD-83 manufactured in August 1994 with serial number 53185. It was equipped with two Pratt & Whitney JT8D-219 turbofan engines.

The aircraft had initially been deployed to service at Reno Air in September 1994 where it was operated until August 1999, until its merger with American Airlines where it then served until March 2001. Subsequently, Turkish charter airline Freebird Airlines had purchased the aircraft and operated it until May 2005. Finally, World Focus Airlines acquired the aircraft and registered it as TC-AKM in May 2005. The MD-83 was leased to Turkish Airlines in late November the same year and was returned seven months later in June 2006. Eventually, World Focus Airlines sub-leased the aircraft to Atlasjet in late June 2007 for a five-month period.

=== Crew ===
The aircrew consisted of two pilots, one technician and four flight attendants. Captain Muhammet Serhat Özdemir, aged 48, was the pilot flying the aircraft. Mehmet Tahir Aksoy, aged 55, was a former Turkish Air Force pilot, and served as the first officer. He had joined World Focus Airlines just three months prior to the crash and had accumulated around 14 hours on the MD-83, well below the minimum 100 hours required by Turkish regulations. Of the seven crew members, three flight attendants were Atlasjet employees, both pilots, the technician and one flight attendant were employed by World Focus Airlines.

=== Passengers ===
All 50 passengers, one of whom was a six-week-old baby, were Turkish citizens. Among those on board was nuclear physicist Engin Arık. She was accompanied by five other scientists traveling to attend a conference at Süleyman Demirel University in Isparta regarding the Turkish Accelerator Center Project. The six scientists were employed at different universities across Turkey and had decisive roles in the project. Prof. Arık was also working for the European Organization for Nuclear Research (CERN) in the ATLAS and CAST experiments.

All passengers and crew members on board were killed in the accident.

== Crash ==
Flight 4203 took off from Istanbul Atatürk Airport in Istanbul in the early hours of 30 November 2007 at 00:51 Eastern European Time (EET) (22:51 UTC on 29 November) bound for Isparta Süleyman Demirel Airport in Isparta Province in southwestern Turkey. The takeoff and climb out from Istanbul were uneventful.
Twenty-seven minutes into the flight, Captain Özdemir told air traffic control (ATC) that they were approaching Isparta airport using VHF omnidirectional range, which is a type of short-range radio navigation system that enables aircraft to determine their position and stay on course; the rather small airport which serves mainly domestic flights was not equipped with the more sophisticated instrument landing system.
At 01:36 EET, the crew made its last routine contact with ATC – absent of any abnormalities – saying that they "are inbound." The air traffic controller acknowledged the message, which constituted the last exchange of words between the crew and the ATC. Further attempts to contact the crew were futile.

=== Immediate response ===
After the estimated time of arrival of Flight 4203 had passed and without a sign of the aircraft's fate, the air traffic controller decided to establish contact with other aircraft in the area, requesting them to look out for the doomed flight. This however returned no results, and the ATC officially declared the aircraft missing and search and rescue efforts led by the Turkish Gendarmerie were initiated. Due to the prevalent darkness and the mountainous terrain, initial ground operations proved difficult so the Turkish Air Force dispatched a helicopter equipped with thermal cameras in order to scour the presumed crash site and locate the aircraft. In the early morning hours shortly past 06:00 EET, the wreckage was located by the helicopter on the 1,830-metre-tall (6,000 ft) Türbetepe hill, some 12 kilometres (7.5 mi) west of the airport and 6 kilometres (3.7 mi) southwest of the town of Keçiborlu. All other search and rescue teams including a police helicopter and an ambulance were immediately directed to that site.
Upon arrival however, there were no survivors among the 57 occupants. The debris field spanned across a 5,000 square metres (54,000 ft^{2}) area.

Initial remarks by the Governor of Isparta Şemsettin Uzun drew the attention to the site where the aircraft came to rest, which he declared did not correspond with the official flight path implying that the flight should never actually have been anywhere near the site where it came down.

Immediately after the crash, Atlasjet's CEO Tuncay Doğaner assured in a press conference that "the accident was caused by a pilot error, there was no technical fault with the aircraft." DGCA general manager Ali Arıduru shared Doğaner's opinion and declared that "there was no problem with the technical maintenance of aircraft, it is evident that the aircraft crashed because of pilot error." These statements were widely criticized in the media and by experts, since they were made at a time when it was impossible to know so quickly what happened without being able to properly assess the situation or know the facts.

== Investigation ==
The investigation into the accident was led by Turkey's Directorate General of Civil Aviation (DGCA, Turkish: Sivil Havacılık Genel Müdürlüğü, SHGM) which immediately deployed a team of four investigators to the crash site. Feridun Seren was appointed as the head of the investigation team responsible for establishing the cause of the crash.

=== Flight recorders ===
Both flight recorders, the cockpit voice recorder (CVR) and the flight data recorder (FDR) were recovered in the afternoon following the crash and were subsequently sent to the Lufthansa Technik laboratories in Germany for analysis.

However, according to an investigative report by the Turkish daily Sabah in February 2012, citing internal correspondence, the flight recorders were never actually handed over to Lufthansa Technik. Instead, the flight recorders were consigned to the German Federal Bureau of Aircraft Accident Investigation (BFU), where they were opened and investigated by Feridun Seren and his team himself. The BFU is said to have stated that the Turkish investigation panel has conducted the investigation itself and that the BFU has not interfered with the process.

Contrary to initial news reports, which stated that both flight recorders had been successfully read out, the investigation team determined that the flight recorders could not be analyzed because the CVR had been inoperative for nine days leading up to the crash and the FDR was mysteriously found to have only recorded the first 14 minutes of the flight.

=== Wet-lease contract ===
In another investigative report brought up by Sabah, it was claimed that the aircraft had been flying without permission on the day of the accident. The sub-lease contract between World Focus Airlines and Atlasjet for the operation of the MD-83 was signed on 25 June 2007 for a five-month period, which ended on 25 November 2007, five days prior to the crash. In a press conference however, Atlasjet refuted the claim that the aircraft was flying without permission, assuring that a short-term contract lasting for three days was signed on 29 November 2007, one day prior to the crash.

=== Faulty aircraft components ===
Although the aircraft was equipped with a ground proximity warning system (GPWS) which alerts the pilots if the aircraft is in immediate danger of flying into the ground or an obstacle, the investigators determined that it had been malfunctioning during at least 85 of the last 234 flights of the aircraft. The unit was previously fitted in Atlasjet's other MD-83 aircraft (registered TC-AKN) but it had been switched a week prior to the accident. Although the malfunction of the GPWS unit was known to the airline and the DGCA, it was not properly logged in the maintenance records in order to go undetected.

Since analysis of the CVR and FDR was impossible, investigators turned their attention to radar recordings which indicated that the doomed flight was approaching Isparta Airport at its intended flight path heading southwest, south of the airport and parallel to the runway and descended to 2,600 metres (8,500 ft). After this stage, the aircraft was supposed to turn around 180 degrees to the right and align with runway 05 for the final approach. However, as it turned towards the runway, the aircraft deviated from its flight path by 30 degrees and ended up flying away from the runway towards the north instead of northeast. Assuming they were on course, the crew descended further but a short time later struck the 1,830 metres (6,000 ft) tall Türbetepe hill.

Weather was instantly ruled out as a possible cause as the weather conditions were good and visibility was not limited at the time of the accident. Investigators also determined that the engines were operating at the time of the collision with terrain, that the landing gear and flaps were deployed properly, that there was no fire, neither pre-crash nor post-crash, and that the crew's alcohol and drug tests returned negative results.
So many uncertainties arose as to what may have contributed to or caused the accident. Because the site where the aircraft came to rest did verifiably not correspond with the official flight path – the flight ended up to the northwest of the airport whereas it was approaching it from the south – and the air traffic controller's account that the crew neither requested a deviation nor declared any other inconvenience such as an emergency, it was determined that there was some kind of navigational error by the fault of the crew.

=== Final report ===
The final report was released in November 2008, one year after the crash. It was determined that the accident was caused by a navigation error by the pilots. The Turkish Transport minister Binali Yıldırım stated that the crash was a "normal controlled flight into terrain by the fault of the crew." The report states that the GPWS was not able to produce audible alarms due to a defect. Both the captain and the first officer were rather inexperienced and it was their first approach to Isparta. They failed to enter either the Standard Instrument Departure of Istanbul or the Standard Terminal Arrival Route and approach procedure of Isparta into the flight management system.

== Aftermath ==
On 3 December 2007, the provincial council of Isparta decided to erect a mausoleum near the crash site to honour the victims.

In February 2008, World Focus Airlines changed its corporate image to "Ankair" as a result of publicity surrounding the crash. Its operating license was suspended by Turkish authorities a short time later.

In October 2011, the head of the investigation team, Feridun Seren, was arrested along with six other defendants in connection with the disputed 2009 Medair Bell 206 crash which killed BBP leader Muhsin Yazıcıoğlu – in whose investigation he was also involved – on grounds of allowing the flight recorders to be tampered with, obscuring evidence and creating bogus protocols.

=== Lawsuit ===
The lawsuit into the crash was launched in December 2009 at the Isparta 1st Heavy Penal Court. The court announced its final decision in January 2015: World Focus Airlines' owner Yavuz Çizmeci was found guilty of negligent homicide for allowing an aircraft unfit to fly and with known maintenance faults to be leased out, and World Focus Airlines' chief executive officer Aydın Kızıltan and technical chief İsmail Taşdelen were found guilty of negligent homicide for the same reason. All three defendants were each sentenced to 11 years and 8 months in prison for negligent homicide. World Focus Airlines' maintenance chief Fikri Zafer Dinçer was also sentenced with 5 years and 10 months in prison for negligent homicide. Former DGCA general manager Ali Arıduru and assistant general manager Oktay Erdağı were sentenced to 1 year and 8 months in prison for malpractice.

The Court of Cassation's 12th Criminal Chamber ratified the Heavy Penal Court's decision in March 2016.

== See also ==
- 2009 Aviastar British Aerospace 146 crash
- Eastern Air Lines Flight 401
