= AtlasGlobal Ukraine =

IATA	ICAO	Call sign
UH	UJX	ATLAS UKRAINE
- Founded: 2013
- Ceased operations: 2019
- Operating bases: Odesa International Airport
- Fleet size: 2
- Destinations: 1
- Parent company: AtlasGlobal
- Headquarters: Lviv, Ukraine
- Website: atlasglb.com.ua

AtlasGlobal Ukraine (Ukrainian: АтласГлобал Україна), branded as atlasglobal UA, was the Ukrainian subsidiary of AtlasGlobal headquartered in Lviv. Its main base was at Kyiv Zhuliany Airport, though the airline only flew one regularly scheduled route out of Odesa International Airport.

== History ==
Founded in 2013, AtlasGlobal - Ukraine was set up as the Ukrainian division of Turkish parent company AtlasGlobal.

On 29 November 2019, it has been reported that lessors took in both of the airline's Airbus A320-200s in the wake of the financial struggle of parent company AtlasGlobal, leaving AtlasGlobal Ukraine without any aircraft.

In March 2020, the Ukrainian aviation authority permanently revoked the airline's operating license.

== Destinations ==
As of November 2019, AtlasGlobal operated a single scheduled route:

City	Country	Airport	Notes
Istanbul	Turkey	Istanbul Airport	
Odesa	Ukraine	Odesa International Airport	

== Fleet ==
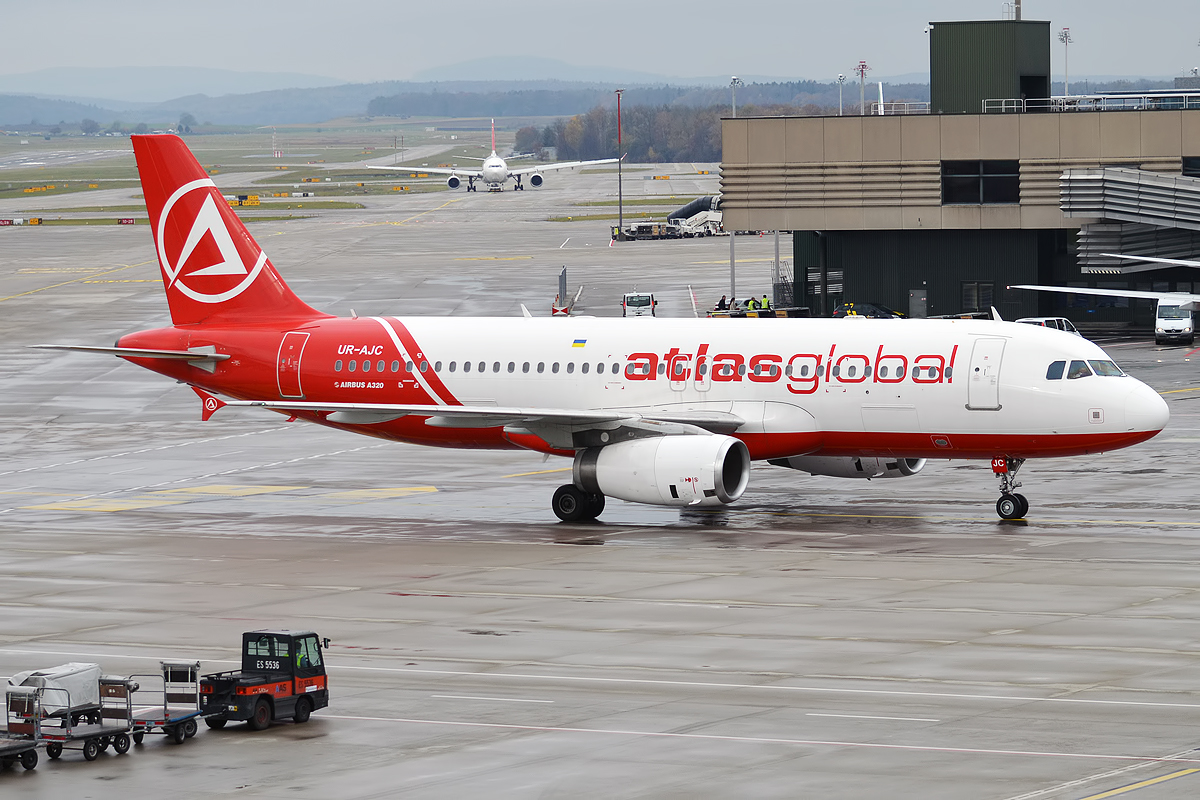
Atlas Global Ukraine Airbus A320-200 at Zürich Airport

The AtlasGlobal Ukraine fleet included the following aircraft as of November 2019:

AtlasGlobal Ukraine fleet
Aircraft	In Service	Orders	Passengers			Notes
Aircraft	In Service	Orders	C	Y	Total	Notes
Airbus A320-200	2	—	8	156	164	returned to lessors
Total	2	—				
