= Engin Arık =

Turkish particle physicist (1948–2007)

- Born: October 14, 1948
- Died: 30 November 2007 (aged 59); Türbetepe, Keçiborlu, Isparta Province, Turkey
- Education: Istanbul University (BS); University of Pittsburgh (MS, PhD)
- Scientific career
- Workplaces: Brookhaven National Laboratory; Westfield College; Rutherford Appleton Laboratory; Boğaziçi University

Engin Arık (October 14, 1948 – November 30, 2007) was a Turkish particle physicist and professor at Boğaziçi University. She led the Turkish participation in a number of experiments at CERN. Arık was a prominent supporter of Turkey's membership to CERN and the founding of a national particle accelerator center as a means to utilize thorium as an energy source. She has also represented Turkey at the Comprehensive Nuclear Test Ban Treaty Organization for a number of years. She died in the Atlasjet Flight 4203 crash on November 30, 2007.

== Education ==
Arık graduated from Istanbul University in 1969 with a BSc in physics and mathematics. As a graduate student, Arik attended University of Pittsburgh where she earned a master's degree in 1971 and a PhD in 1976 in experimental high energy physics, where she worked on the E583 experiment at Brookhaven National Laboratory. Arık's thesis was titled "Inclusive lambda production in sigma minus - proton collisions at 23 GeV/c." Following her PhD, Arık went to University of London, Westfield College for postdoctoral work. Here she worked in high energy physics research being carried out at the Rutherford Laboratory and later at the CERN Laboratory. While working as a postdoctoral researcher, she contributed to the "measurement of observables in $\Pi^+p\rightarrow\Kappa^+\Sigma^+$."

== Career ==
In 1979, Arık returned to Turkey and joined the Department of Physics at Boğaziçi University, first as a lecturer, then in 1981 as an associate professor. In 1983, Arık briefly left her position at the university to work in industry with Control Data Corporation. Arık would return to Boğaziçi University in 1985 and in 1988, she received a full professorship.

While teaching at Boğaziçi University, Arık performed research in the field of high energy physics. Her work faced limitations due to a scarcity of resources in Turkey available for this area of research. In the early 1990s she joined experiments at CERN as a collaborator. Experiments she was a part of include: CHARM II, CHORUS, Spin Muon Collaboration (SMC), ATLAS, and CERN Axion Solar Telescope (CAST). During her career Arık supported a movement for Turkey to become a full member of CERN as opposed to an associate member. A supporter of women in science, she was amongst the founders of the ATLAS Women's Network.

From 1997 to 2000 Arık was appointed to represent Turkey at the Comprehensive Nuclear Test Ban Treaty Organization, which was held at the headquarters of the International Atomic Energy Agency (IAEA) in Vienna, Austria. During this time, Arık commuted between Geneva, Istanbul and Vienna. Arık spoke often about the use of thorium as an energy source in a new generation of Nuclear Power Plants, calling it "the most strategic material of the 21st century."

Throughout her career, Arık published more than 100 studies in the fields of experimental high energy physics (HEP), detectors, applications of nuclear physics, and mathematical physics. She was the vice president of the Turkish Physical Society between 2001 and 2003. After she died she was described as a "bannerbearer" for HEP in her country, and "one of the engin(es)" for the HEP community.

== Death and legacy ==
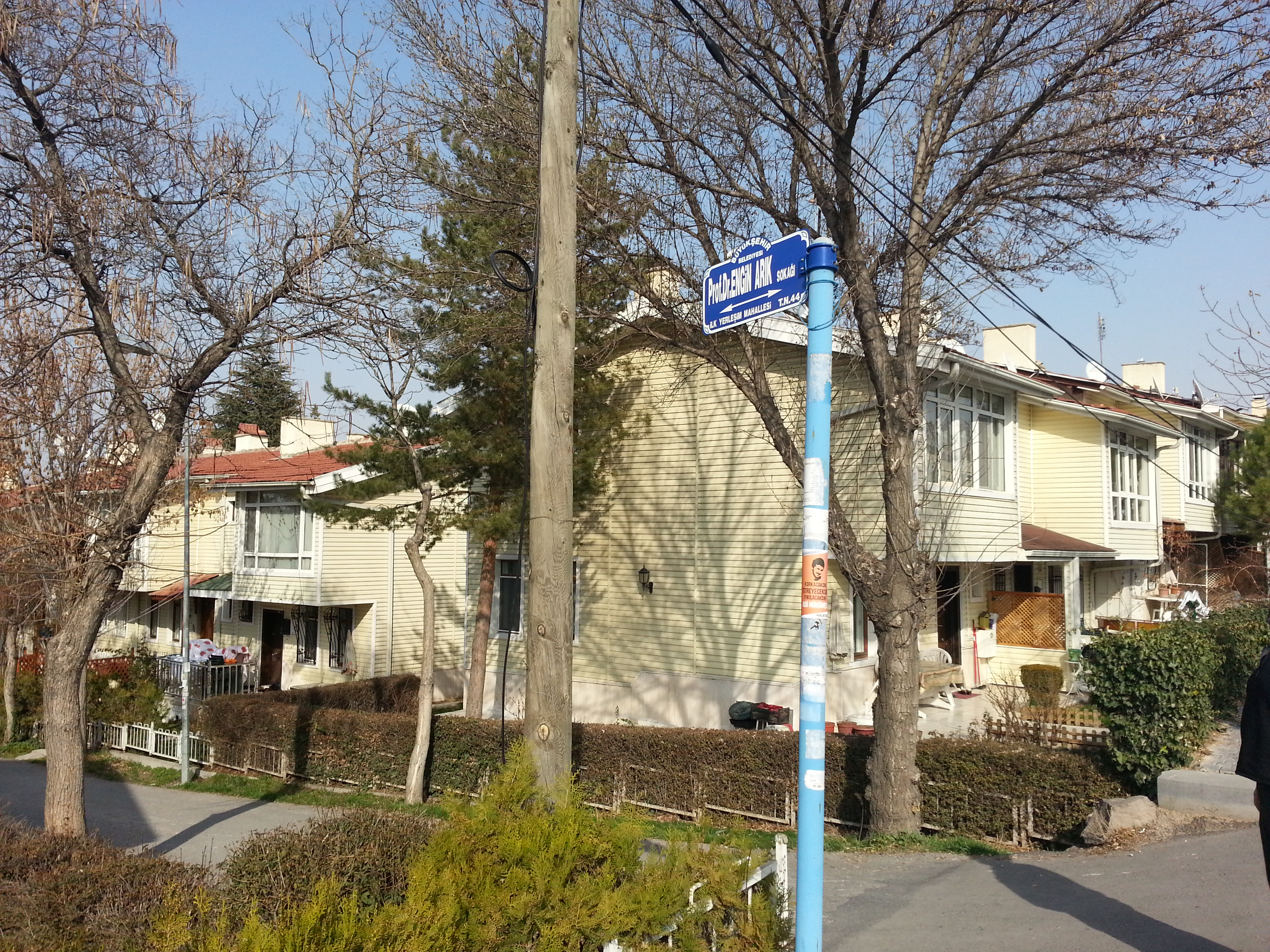
Street Sign named after Engin Arik

Arık died in the Atlasjet Flight 4203 crash on November 30, 2007. She was traveling with two students and three colleagues to Isparta, Turkey for the fourth workshop on a potential Turkish particle accelerator design.

After she died a fellowship at CERN was established in her memory. Until 2015, the fellowship supported a total of 45 Turkish students so that they could attend CERN's Summer Student Program. Funding for the fellowship was provided by institutes, individuals, and private businesses.

An international conference was held at Boğaziçi University in İstanbul on October 27–31, 2008 in memory of Arık and her colleagues. Another iteration was held three years later, organized jointly by the Doğuş and Boğaziçi Universities, with support from CERN and the Turkish Academy of Sciences. In 2013, her name was given to the main conference room at the accelerator institute building she helped found. The building is now part of TARLA, the Turkish Accelerator Radiation Laboratory.

A street has been named after Arık in the İlkyerleşim neighborhood of the Yenimahalle district in Ankara, Turkey. A monument at the Süleyman Demirel University commemorating the six scientists who died at the plane crash has a bust of Arık specifically.

== Assassination allegations ==
There are various assassination allegations about Engin Arık's death. After the plane crash, some groups claimed that it was an assassination and that the accident was preplanned. An investigation has been opened on this issue and is still ongoing.
