= Isparta Süleyman Demirel Airport =

Isparta Süleyman Demirel Airport Isparta Süleyman Demirel Havalimanı
- IATA: ISE; ICAO: LTFC

Summary
- Airport type: Public
- Operator: DHMİ (State Airports Administrations)
- Serves: Isparta, Turkey
- Location: Keçiborlu, Isparta, Turkey
- Opened: 21 July 1997; 28 years ago
- Elevation AMSL: 2,835 ft / 864 m
- Coordinates: 37°51′54″N 30°22′55″E
- Website: DHMİ

Map
- Location of airport in Turkey ISE (Europe)

Runways
Direction	Length		Surface
Direction	ft	m	Surface
05/23	9,842	3,000	Concrete

Statistics (2025)
- Annual passenger capacity: 1,500,000
- Passengers: 68,639
- Passenger change 2024–25: ▼9%
- Aircraft movements: 28,920
- Movements change 2024–25: ▲9%

Isparta Süleyman Demirel Airport (IATA: ISE, ICAO: LTFC) (Turkish: Isparta Süleyman Demirel Havalimanı), inaugurated on July 21, 1997, is an airport serving the city of Isparta in south-western Turkey. Located in the Keçiborlu district, it is 28 km from the city. The airport is named after the 9th President of Turkey, Süleyman Demirel, who was a native of Isparta.

== Facilities ==
The airport's passenger terminal which can also serve international flights, covers an area of 5,400 m^{2} and has an annual capacity of 600,000 passengers.

== Airlines and destinations ==
The following airlines operate regular scheduled and charter flights at Isparta Airport:

Airlines	Destinations
Turkish Airlines	Istanbul

== Statistics ==
Isparta–Süleyman Demirel Airport passenger traffic statistics
Year (months)	Domestic	% change	International	% change	Total	% change
2025	58,237	▲1%	10,402	▼42%	68,639	▼9%
2024	57,871	▲5%	17,863	▼34%	75,734	▼8%
2023	55,347	▲22%	27,201	▲1%	82,548	▲14%
2022	45,479	▲14%	26,931	▲189%	72,410	▲48%
2021	39,742	▲8%	9,326	▲75%	49,068	▲16%
2020	36,917	▼54%	5,330	▼92%	42,247	▼72%
2019	79,866	▼9%	69,771	▼18%	149,637	▼13%
2018	87,971	▲3%	85,010	▼17%	172,981	▼8%
2017	85,615	▲11%	102,594	▼19%	188,209	▼8%
2016	77,225	▲0%	126,982	▼23%	204,207	▼15%
2015	77,139	▲22%	164,228	▲35%	241,367	▲31%
2014	63,030	▲200%	121,899	▼4%	184,929	▲25%
2013	21,043	-	126,617	▼153%	147,660	▲195%
2012	-	▼100%	50,062	▲5895%	50,062	▲132%
2011	20,724	▼20%	835	▼89%	21,559	▼35%
2010	25,848	▲710%	7,563	▼43%	33,411	▲103%
2009	3,192	-	13,269	▼12%	16,461	▲9%
2008	-	▼100%	15,053	▼59%	15,053	▼68%
2007	11,166	Steady	36,398	Steady	47,564	Steady

== See also ==
- Atlasjet Flight 4203
