= Çağatay Akman =

Turkish singer

- Born: 31 July 1998 (age 27); Korgun, Çankırı, Turkey
- Occupations: Singer, Streamer
- Musical career
- Instruments: Guitar
- Years active: 2016–present
- Labels: 2645 Records; DMC

Çağatay Akman (born 31 July 1998) is a Turkish singer and songwriter. Akman became famous with the release of his song "Gece Gölgenin Rahatına Bak" on 12 June 2016. On 8 June 2017, another single, "Sensin Benim En Derin Kuyum", was released. It was followed by "Bizim Hikâye" on 14 September. The latter was used on the soundtrack of the TV series Bizim Hikaye. On 15 February 2018, another song, titled "Yüreğim Davacı", was released. Akman, who also plays guitar, has tried acting by appearing on the 12th episode of Bizim Hikaye in a supporting role. He was nominated for the "Best Newcomer" award at the 44th Golden Butterfly Awards.

== Early life ==
Çağatay Akman was born on 31 July 1998 in Korgun, Çankırı. For failing his classes twice, he was thrown out of high school.

== Career ==
Under the direction of Zeo Jaweed, Akman's new song was released by 2645 Records on 12 December 2016, titled "Gece Gölgenin Rahatına Bak". Its lyrics were written by Çağatay Akman and Koray Albayrak. The song was viewed 14 million times in one week on YouTube. After a month, its number of views reached 106 million. The video later passed 240 million views on the platform.

The Israeli music group Anna RF accused Akman of copyright violation and took "Gece Gölgenin Rahatına Bak" off YouTube. Akman said that the song was made and composed by Mehmet Ali Sezer, who had also composed the song "Seni Rüyamda Görsem", and claimed that it was in fact Anna RF who had stolen a Turkish piece and said that he had already bought the copyright of the song from Mehmet Ali Sezer. Commenting on the subject, Anna RF claimed that the original composition of the song belonged to them and that there was no connection between their song and Mehmet Ali Sezer. On 19 June 2017, the song was again restored on YouTube.

Akman revealed on his Instagram the release date for his new song "Sensin Benim En Derin Kuyum", which was set to be published on 9 June. On 9 June 2017, the song's music video was released and was watched more than 100 thousand times in one hour. The song, which was written and composed by Çağatay Akman and Ahmet Hatipoğlu, was turned into a music video by Yekta Özbilen. "Sensin Benim En Derin Kuyum" became one of the most-watched videos on YouTube in 2017.

In the same year he composed the main theme song for the TV series Bizim Hikaye, also titled "Bizim Hikâye" after the series, and it was released on 14 September 2017. Its music video was released by 2645 Records on YouTube. It was again written by Çağatay Akman and Abdullah Özdoğan and its music video was directed by Yekta Özbilen. Akman was nominated for the "Best Newcomer" award at the 44th Golden Butterfly Awards.

Akman's 4th single, "Yüreğim Davacı", was prepared for the 22nd episode of Bizim Hikaye. On 15 February 2018, the song's music video was released on YouTube. It was written by Ahmet Hatipoğlu, and Ahmet Can Tekin served as the music video director for the song.

On 17 July 2018, Akman announced on his Instagram account that his new single "Çek Silahını Daya Göğsüme" would be released on digital platforms on 21 July. It was released in accordance with his plans on 21 July 2018 by 2645 Records on YouTube. Its lyrics were written by İlyas Ertürk, and Kemal Başbuğ directed its music video.

On 27 November 2018, Akman released the single "Ben Ne İnsanlar Gördüm". It was originally performed by İbrahim Tatlıses for Ahmet Selçuk İlkan's album Unutulmayan Şarkılar Vol 2. The music video for the single was directed by Kubilay Kasap and shot over the course of 20 hours at a hotel in Levent.

== Artistry ==
I am making universal music. Everyone calls it rap but it's not rap. [It's] rhythmic music, I do not rap, and I can use my voice. Rhythmic songs turn straight in rap. They call it rap because it's a bit smoothing. I can sing in any style. I try to sing in all styles as far as I can.

— Çağatay Akman

Çağatay Akman, who can play guitar, is described as a rap music artist, but he states what he does is fluid and his style is not necessarily rap. Akman, who said that he tries to create his own style, believes that no one has the same style of music as his.

== Reception ==
Sabah's author Meltem Fıratlı wrote in her article "High schoolers reached the top" on 24 December 2016, that Akman "is a musician who has brought his fans to the peak. With his music, he reaches out to a large number of people, and has become the voice of a quiet majority."

On 19 January 2017, Mevlüt Tezel from Sabah published an article titled "Çağatay Akman deception" and claimed that Akman's song, in fact, had fake views on YouTube and gave spurious social messages, and that Akman's only desire was to become famous.

In his article for Hürriyet, published on 8 March 2017, Cengiz Semerciğlu argued that Çağatay Akman was an 18-year-old guy with great talent who had emerged from the difficult conditions in Zeytinburnu.

Kâmuran Akdemir from Gecce wrote the article "Çağatay Akman's success!" that was published on 26 October 2017. He said the artist was able to become famous with only one song and he would not be able to have the same success in music in the future. He also argued that his supporters were being slipped up by his songs on Bizim Hikaye.

Ali Eyüboğlu from Milliyet saw the success of the artist due to the power of internet and to the issues addressed by him in the song "Gece Gölgenin Rahatına Bak".

In his article for Milliyet, titled "Turkish Films in Mexican TV" which was published in May 2018, Sina Koloğlu discussed the song "Bizim Hikaye" by Akman and wrote: "The piece was nice and he did the job well. I liked his words and style, and with his use of the verse 'We are Zeytinburnu street children', I wish him all the best."

Writing for Milliyet, Andaç Üzel criticized Akman in his article, titled "At the age of 20 he wrote about himself: What is 'Being Çağatay Akman'?", and questioned his decision for publishing an autobiography.

== Discography ==
Compilation albums

- Yirmi - Bir (2019)

EPs

- Zor (2023)

Singles

- "Gece Gölgenin Rahatına Bak" (2016)
- "Sensin Benim En Derin Kuyum" (2017)
- "Bizim Hikaye" (2018)
- "Yüreğim Davacı" (2018)
- "Çek Silahını Daya Göğsüme" (2018)
- "Ben Ne İnsanlar Gördüm" (Ahmet Selçuk İlkan Unutulmayan Şarkılar, Vol. 2) (2018)
- "Hiç Bıkmadan" (feat. Ahmet Hatipoğlu) (2019)
- "Özgür Dünya" (Özgür Dünya movie soundtrack) (2019)
- "Can Havli" (2019)
- "Bul Beni Çıkar Bu Çukurdan" (2020)
- "Kül" (2021)
- "Derde Döktüğüm Saçlarım" (2022)
- "Gökyüzü Mavi" (2022)
- "Porselen" (2022)
- "Unuttum Yalnızlığı" (2022)
- "Ayaz" (2023)
- "Köz" (2023)
- "C Takımıı" (2023)
- "Yine Kendi Başımda" (2024)

== Filmography ==
Film
Year	Title	Role	Notes
2019	Kuşatma Yedi Uyuyanlar	Kubilay	

Television
Year	Title	Role	Notes
2017	Bizim Hikaye	Çağatay	with Burak Deniz & Hazal Kaya
2019	Benimle Söyle	Himself	judge

== Books ==
- Nasıl Çağatay Akman Oldum

== Awards ==
Year	Organization	Award	Result
2017	44th Golden Butterfly Awards	Best Newcomer	Nominated
