= Hazal (name) =

- Gender: Female

Origin
- Region of origin: Turkey

Hazal is a Turkish female given name that means dried tree leaves and autumn flower.

== Arabic ==
Ghazal or Ğazal also Arabic for gazelle.

== Kurdish ==
Hazal or Xezal means also gazelle or deer.

== Notable people ==
- Hazal Kaya (born 1990), Turkish actress
- Hazal Sarıkaya (born 1996), Turkish swimmer
- Hazal Türesan (born 1985), Turkish actress
- Hazal Selin Uygur, Turkish volleyball player
- Hazal Filiz Küçükköse, Turkish actress
- Hazal Subaşı, Turkish actress and model
- Hazal Adıyaman, Turkish actress

== See also ==
- Chazal
