= Hande Erçel =

Turkish actress (born 1993)

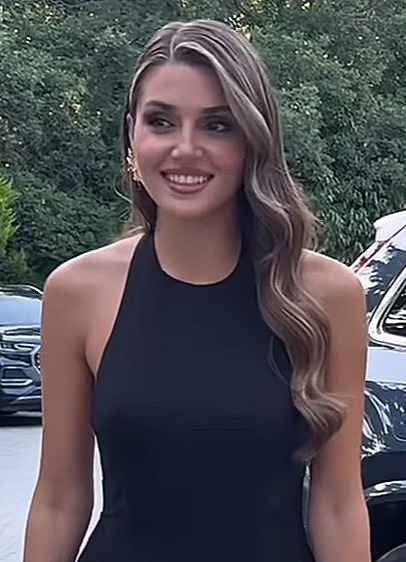
- Hande Erçel in 2025
- Born: 24 November 1993 (age 32); Bandırma, Turkey
- Education: Mimar Sinan Fine Arts University
- Occupation: Actress
- Years active: 2014–present
- Known for: Güneşin Kızları; Aşk Laftan Anlamaz; Sen Çal Kapımı; Bambaşka Biri
- Height: 1.70 m (5 ft 6.93 in)

Hande Erçel (born 24 November 1993) is a Turkish actress, known for her work in television and films such as Güneşin Kızları (2015–16), Aşk Laftan Anlamaz (2016–17), Sen Çal Kapımı (2020–21) and Bambaşka Biri (2023–24). She made her film debut in the historical drama Intoxicated by Love (2024) which broke box-office records and starred in the Netflix romance Chasing the Wind (2025).

== Early life ==
She was born in 1993 in Bandırma, the daughter of Aylin (who died from cancer in 2019) and her father Kaya Erçel; she has an older sister, Gamze. She studied at Mimar Sinan Fine Arts University in the Department of Traditional Turkish Arts. In 2012, she participated in a beauty pageant held in Azerbaijan, where she placed second.

== Career ==
Between 2015 and 2016, she portrayed the character Selin Yılmaz Mertoğlu in the television series Güneşin Kızları, aired on Kanal D. Subsequently, from 2016 to 2017, she played the role of Hayat Uzun in the series Aşk Laftan Anlamaz, broadcast on Show TV. Her performance in this series earned her the Best Female Comedy Actress award at the Golden Butterfly Awards.

In 2019, she appeared as Müjde Akay in the series Halka on TRT 1 and as Azize Aksu Günay in the series Azize on Kanal D. From 2020 to 2021, she portrayed Eda Yıldız in the series Sen Çal Kapımı, aired on Fox. From 2023 to 2024, she played Leyla Gediz in the series Bambaşka Biri, also broadcast on Fox.

== Endorsement ==
Erçel was the face of personal care brand L'Oréal Turkey and the oral care brand Signal. In 2017, she was selected as the face of DeFacto's 2017-2018 Fall collection campaign called "Velvet". In 2020, she was named global ambassador for clothing brand Nocturne and headlined multiple campaigns for the brand. In 2025, after years of collaborating, the brand launched a collection designed by Erçel named "Inspired By Her". In December 2021, Erçel was selected as the newest face of renowned Turkish jewelry brand Atasay Jewellery.

In May 2022, Disney+ picked her as its new ambassador. In August 2023, she become the face of Saudi perfume house Laverne's "Miss Laverne". In that year, she was also named the new face of deodorant brand Emotion and become the newest ambassador for ice cream brand Magnum, attending the Cannes Film Festival as the advertising model of the brand. In April 2025, Italian luxury jewelry brand Pomellato announced Erçel as its new global brand ambassador.

== Influence ==
Erçel is among the highest-paid actresses in Turkey and is the most-followed Turkish actress on Instagram. She was the only Turkish actress to be featured on IMDb's World's Most Beautiful Actresses list. Fillgab, a global website, ranked her first on its "10 Most Beautiful Muslim Women in The World" list. Erçel is the first and only Turkish actor to appear on the cover of Marie Claire Spain, The Hollywood Magazine and Grazia. The Hollywood Magazine called her "one of the most influential public figures in Turkey and the wider region" and "producers are calling her “the next Penélope Cruz meets Zendaya” — a rare blend of grace, cultural depth, and magnetic screen presence." She appeared on other magazines such as Vogue Turkey, Vogue Arabia, Elle Turkey, HELLO Turkey, Harper Bazaar Turkey and InStyle Turkey to promote various brands.

== Filmography ==
=== Film ===
Year	Title	Role	Notes
2024	Intoxicated by Love	Kimia Khatoon	Supporting role
2025	Chasing the Wind	Asli Mansoy	Leading Role

=== Television ===
Year	Title	Role	Notes
2014	The Wren	Zahide	Supporting role
2014	Çılgın Dersane Üniversitede	Meryem	Supporting role
2014	Hayat Ağacı	Selen Karahanlı	Supporting role
2015–2016	Güneşin Kızları	Selin Yılmaz	Leading role
2016–2017	Aşk Laftan Anlamaz	Hayat Uzun Sarsılmaz	Leading role
2017–2018	Siyah İnci	Hazal Şulabı/Naz Demiroğlu	Leading role
2019	Halka	Müjde Akay	Leading role
2019	Azize	Azize Günay/Melek Aydın	Leading role
2020–2021	Sen Çal Kapımı	Eda Yıldız	Leading role
2023-2024	Bambaşka Biri	Leyla Gediz	Leading role
2025	Aşk ve Gözyaşi	Meyra Aksel	Leading role

=== Web TV ===
Year	Title	Role	Platform	Production
2025	Reminder (Aşkı Hatırla)	Güneş Gülner	Disney+	O3 Medya
2025	Two Worlds, One Wish	Bilge Tanil	Prime Video	Taff Pictures

=== Music video ===
Year	Singer	Song	Notes
2017	Demir Yağmur	"Canın Sağ Olsun"	with Rıza Kocaoğlu

== Awards and nominations ==
Year	Award	Category	Work	Result
2012	Miss Civilization of Turkey	First	Herself	Won
2012	Miss Civilization of World	Second	Herself	Won
2015	42nd Golden Butterfly Awards	Rising Star	Güneşin Kızları	Won
2016	İTÜ EMÖS Success Awards	Most Successful Actress	Güneşin Kızları	Won
2016	Turkey's Youth Awards	Best Actress	Güneşin Kızları	Won
2016	KTÜ Media Awards	New Rising Star	Güneşin Kızları	Won
2016	İMK Social Media Awards	Best Actress	Aşk Laftan Anlamaz	Nominated
2017	Müzikonair Awards	Best Actress in Television Series	Aşk Laftan Anlamaz	Nominated
2017	Yeditepe University 5.Dilek Awards	Best Actress in Comedy	Aşk Laftan Anlamaz	Won
2017	Turkey's Children Awards	Best Actress in Drama Series	Aşk Laftan Anlamaz	Nominated
2017	İstanbul Moda Rehberi Awards	Best Actress	Aşk Laftan Anlamaz	Won
2017	44th Golden Butterfly Awards	Best Actress in Comedy	Aşk Laftan Anlamaz	Won
2018	Marketing Turkey: The One Awards	Best Actress	Siyah İnci	Won
2021	Golden Wings Awards	Best Actress of the Year	Sen Çal Kapımı	Won
2021	Öğrencilere Sorduk Project	The Best Duo	Sen Çal Kapımı	Won
2021	Güzel Awards	Best Actress	Sen Çal Kapımı	Won
2021	Güzel Awards	Best Couple	Sen Çal Kapımı	Won
2021	Ayakli Gazete TV Stars Awards	Best Actress in Romantic Comedy	Sen Çal Kapımı	Won
2021	Ayakli Gazete TV Stars Awards	Best TV Series Couple	Sen Çal Kapımı	Won
2021	47th Golden Butterfly Awards	Best Couple	Sen Çal Kapımı	Won
2021	47th Golden Butterfly Awards	Best Actress in Romantic Comedy	Sen Çal Kapımı	Nominated
2021	10th KTÜ Media Awards	Most Admired TV Series Couple	Sen Çal Kapımı	Won
2022	Elle Style Awards	Elle Cover Girl of the Year	Herself	Won
2023	49th Golden Butterfly Awards	Best Actress	Bambaşka Biri	Nominated
2023	49th Golden Butterfly Awards	Best Couple (with Burak Deniz)	Bambaşka Biri	Nominated
2024	Elle Style Awards	Fashion Collaboration of the Year	Nocturne	Won
2024	American Turkish Society Annual Gala	Honorary Award for Contribution to Turkish Television	Herself	Won
2024	Women of the Year 2024 - Harper's Bazaar	Digital Star of the Year	Herself	Won
2025	BMag	Best Female Fashion Icon of the Year	Herself	Won
2026	Elle Style Awards	Stylish Actress of the Year	Herself	Won
