= Burak Deniz =

Turkish actor and model (born 1991)

- Born: Burak Deniz; 17 February 1991 (age 35); Istanbul, Turkey
- Education: Çanakkale Onsekiz Mart University
- Occupation: Actor
- Years active: 2011–present
- Known for: Aşk Laftan Anlamaz; Bambaşka Biri; Bizim Hikaye
- Height: 1.77 m (5 ft 10 in)
- Awards: Tap for full list

Burak Deniz (born 17 February 1991) is a Turkish actor and model who works in films and television. He is known for portraying Murat Sarsılmaz in the popular rom-com Aşk Laftan Anlamaz series, Barış Aktan in the drama series Bizim Hikaye and Kenan Öztürk/Doğan Kaya in the murder mystery drama Bambaşka Biri.

In 2021, he went on to star as the titular character in hit series Maraşlı, followed by playing Asaf in Disney+ series The Ignorant Angels (2022) and Maran in the Netflix series Şahmaran (2023). Deniz is also known for playing Ozan in the films Arada (2018) and Semih in the Netflix original Kal (2022).

== Early life ==
Deniz was born on 17 February 1991, in Istanbul, and grew up in İzmit. He graduated from İzmit 50 Yıl Cumhuriyet Primary School, and Gazi High School. He attended acting workshops while he was still in high school, and was discovered by the casting director Gökçe Doruk Erten, who helped him start his career. Deniz studied History of Art at Çanakkale 18 Mart University.

== Career ==
=== Early beginnings (2011–2015) ===
Deniz began his career with the series Kolej Günlüğü, where he played the leading role of Onur. In 2012, he starred as Tarık in Sultan. In 2013, he portrayed Burak Topçuoğlu in the series Kaçak; the popular series would go on to air on Netflix. In 2015, Deniz essayed Aras in the series Medcezir; an adaptation of the American television series The O.C..

In 2015, Deniz starred as Toprak in the series Tatlı Küçük Yalancılar which is inspired by American TV show Pretty Little Liars. It also co-starred Şükrü Özyıldız, Bensu Soral, Büşra Develi, Melisa Şenolsun, Dilan Çiçek Deniz and Beste Kökdemir. In 2016, he played Mert in Gecenin Kraliçesi alongside Meryem Uzerli and Murat Yıldırım.

=== Aşk Laftan Anlamaz and rise to fame (2016–2019) ===
From 2016 to 2017, he portrayed the role of Murat Sarsılmaz opposite Hande Erçel in the widely popular rom-com series Aşk Laftan Anlamaz. Set in Istanbul, the show follows a workplace romance at a multinational fashion company, Sarte. Deniz's character, Murat is the crown prince of the textile empire. The series became an international phenomenon and won the leading duo several awards.

In 2017, he starred as Barış Aktan alongside Hazal Kaya in the series Bizim Hikaye. It is an adaptation of the UK series Shameless. In 2018, he made his film debut with Arada, which is about a punk singer wanting to leave Turkey who ends up in a nightmarish, hallucinatory trip through Istanbul.

=== Variation, web series, and more (2020–present) ===
In 2020, Deniz reunited with Dilan Çiçek Deniz to star in the web series Yarım Kalan Aşklar. It revolves around Ozan, a journalist who loses his life in an accident, only to get resurrected in a new body, with Burak Deniz playing the role of the resurrected body. He then starred as Celal "Maraşlı" Kün in the award-winning series Maraşlı opposite Alina Boz the following year.

During 2022, he once again came together with Dilan Çiçek Deniz to star in the Netflix movie Kal, and portrayed Asaf in the Italian series The Ignorant Angels from the fourth episode after Can Yaman turned it down due to scheduling conflicts. Deniz travelled to Italy and even spoke Italian for the role. He starred in the Netflix series Şahmaran the following year.

In 2023, Deniz reunited with Erçel for the crime drama series Bambaşka Biri. He portrayed Kenan Öztürk, a popular journalist grappling with the effects of dissociative personality disorder. His alter-ego Doğan Kaya is an avenging murderer. The series topped commercial demographics and became most watched in all categories.

In 2024-2025, he starred in the award-winning series Bir Gece Masali as an organized crime unit commissioner alongside Su Burcu Yazgı Coşkun and Gürkan Uygun, the former had previously worked in Bizim Hikaye while the latter previously starred in Kaçak; the show concluded with 35 episodes within one season. The same year, he starred in the Disney+ movie Umami and the NOW series Sahtekarlar; the latter ended in 2026 due to low ratings.

== Personal life ==
He was in relationship with Büşra Develi from 2015 to 2018; the two starred together in Tatlı Küçük Yalancılar and Arada. Deniz was then in a relationship with Turkish model Didem Soydan from 2020 to 2022; the breakup was surrounded by rumors.

In addition to his mother tongue, Turkish, he can speak and understand English.

== Filmography ==
=== Television ===
Year	Show	Role	Network	Ref(s)
2011	Kolej Günlüğü	Onur	Teve2	
2012	Sultan	Tarik	Kanal D	
2012	Böyle Bitmesin	Fedat	TRT 1	
2013–2015	Kaçak	Burak Topcuoğlu	ATV	
2015	Medcezir	Aras	Star TV	
2015	Tatlı Küçük Yalancılar	Toprak Kaynak	Star TV	
2016	Gecenin Kraliçesi	Mert Alkan	Star TV	
2016–2017	Aşk Laftan Anlamaz	Murat Sarsılmaz	Show TV	
2017–2019	Bizim Hikaye	Savaş "Barış" Aktan	Fox	
2021	Maraşlı	Celal "Maraşlı" Kün Mehmet İnce	ATV	
2023–2024	Bambaşka Biri	Kenan Öztürk Doğan Kaya	FOX	
2024-2025	Bir Gece Masali	Mahir Yılmaz	ATV	
2025-2026	Sahtekarlar	Ertan Aydın	NOW	

=== Films ===
Year	Title	Role	Platform	Ref(s)
2018	Arada	Ozan	—N/a	
2022	Kal	Semih	Netflix Turkey	
2025	Umami	Chef Sina	Disney+	

=== Web series ===
Year	Title	Role	Network
2020	Yarım Kalan Aşklar	Mehmet Kadir Bilmez Ozan	BluTV
2022	The Ignorant Angels	Asaf	Disney+
2023–	Şahmaran	Maran Yaloğlu	Netflix Turkey

=== Music videos ===
Year	Song	Singer	Ref
2017	Bizim Hikaye	Çağatay Akman	
2018	Bir Beyaz Orkide	Cihan Mürtezaoğlu	

== Awards and nominations ==
Year	Award	Category	Work	Result	Reference
2017	Golden Butterfly Awards	Best Male Actor In Comedy & Romantic Comedy Series	Aşk Laftan Anlamaz	Nominated	
2018	GQ Awards	Man of the Year	—N/a	Won	
2019	Latina Turkish Awards	Best Actor	Bizim Hikaye	Won	
2019	Latina Turkish Awards	Best Couple (with Hazal Kaya)	Bizim Hikaye	Won	
2019	Latina Turkish Awards	Best Kiss (with Hazal Kaya)	Bizim Hikaye	Won	
2019	Golden Butterfly Awards	Best Couple (with Hazal Kaya)	Bizim Hikaye	Nominated	
2019	Golden Butterfly Awards	Best Actor	Bizim Hikaye	Nominated	
2021	City's Best Brands Awards	Best Actor	Maraşlı	Won	
2021	Yeditepe Dilek Awards	Best Couple (with Alina Boz)	Maraşlı	Won	
2023	Distinctive International Arab Festivals Awards	Best International Actor	Bambaşka Biri	Won	
2023	Golden Butterfly Awards	Best Actor	Bambaşka Biri	Nominated	
2023	Golden Butterfly Awards	Best Couple (with Hande Erçel)	Bambaşka Biri	Nominated	
2023	MevcutBilgi Bests of the Year Awards	Best Couple (with Hande Erçel)	Bambaşka Biri	Nominated	
2023	Eurexpo Festiculture	Most Popular Actor of the Year	Bambaşka Biri	Won	
2024	GQ Awards	Screen Star of the Year	—N/a	Won	
2024	İTÜ İMK Social Media Awards	Best Actor	—N/a	Won	
2024	Golden Butterfly Awards	Best Actor	Şahmaran	Nominated	
2024	Golden Butterfly Awards	Best Couple (with Serenay Sarıkaya)	Şahmaran	Nominated	
2024	Golden Butterfly Awards	Best Actor	Bir Gece Masali	Nominated	
2025	Jury's Special Award	Best Couple (with Su Burcu Yazgı Coşkun)	Bir Gece Masali	Won	
