= Bambaşka Biri =

Turkish romantic drama television series

- Also known as: Another Love
- Genre: Romance; Drama; Mystery
- Screenplay by: Tolga Aydın; Lokman Maral
- Story by: Ethem Özışık
- Directed by: Neslihan Yeşilyurt
- Starring: Burak Deniz; Hande Erçel
- Country of origin: Turkey
- Original language: Turkish
- No. of seasons: 1
- No. of episodes: 16

Production
- Executive producers: Burak Sağyaşar; Timur Savcı
- Production location: Istanbul
- Running time: 120 minutes
- Production companies: Tims&B

Original release
- Network: Fox
- Release: September 11, 2023 – January 13, 2024

Bambaşka Biri (transl. A Completely Different Person) is a Turkish romantic mystery drama television series directed by Neslihan Yeşilyurt. Produced by Tims&B Production, it stars Burak Deniz and Hande Erçel as Kenan Öztürk and Leyla Gediz. The series aired on Fox Turkey from September 11, 2023 to January 13, 2024.

== Synopsis ==
The murder of Hamdi Atılbay in the forest brings together the paths of young prosecutor Leyla Gediz, who wants to leave her complicated past behind and establish a new order, and Kenan Ozturk, a journalist and news bulletin presenter who has an orderly and famous life. However, this murder heralds the destruction of not only their love, but also the truth they know about their lives.

== Cast ==
=== Main ===
- Burak Deniz as
  - Kenan Öztürk: a successful and popular news bulletin anchor and journalist; former employee of TVR; Leyla's fiancé
  - Doğan Kaya: Kenan's alter-ego and second personality due to dissociative identity disorder; a murderer who takes revenge by killing criminals
    - Sarp Kaan Altınçapa as young Kenan Öztürk/Doğan Kaya/Yusuf Karacabey
- Hande Erçel as Leyla Gediz: a skilled public prosecutor at justice court; Kenan's fiancée

=== Recurring ===
- Cem Davran as Turan Öztürk: Deputy chief prosecutor at justice court; Nevin's husband; Kenan's adoptive father; Leyla's superior
- Berrin Arısoy as Nevin Öztürk: Turan's wife; Kenan's adoptive mother
- Gülçin Hatıhan as Şahinde Gediz: Ekrem's wife; Leyla and Tahir's mother
- Muttalip Müjdeci as Ekrem Gediz: Sahinde's husband; Leyla and Tahir's father
- Begüm Akkaya as Yasemin Arca: a lawyer; Leyla's best friend; Tahir's former girlfriend; Murat's fiancée
- Ferit Aktug as Murat Erden: Former news director at TVR; Kenan's best friend; Yasemin's fiancé
- Uğur Uzunel as Tahir Gediz: Sahinde and Ekrem's son; Leyla's brother; Yasemin's former boyfriend; Nuray's husband
- Polen Emre as Nuray Gediz: Tahir's wife
- Menderes Samancılar as Idris Tashly: Sadiq's brother; Kenan's uncle; Dogan's accomplice
- Asli Orcan as Nükhet Arslan: Head and owner of TVR; Kenan's one-sided lover
- Yeşim Gül as Müşerref Karaca: Kenan's mother
- Koray Karaca as Refik: Leyla's subordinate officer; commissioner at justice court
- Yunus Narin as Ozgür: a businessman; Leyla's one-sided pursuer
- Yasar Gündem as Dr. Süheyl: Kenan's doctor
- Bahadir Vatanoglu as Gökhan: Tahir's friend
- Özhan Carda as Hamdi Atilbay: a rapist; Sedef's father; murdered by Doğan
- Gonca Vuslateri as Sedef Atilbay: Hamdi's daughter
- Birgül Ulusoy as Nurgül: Nuray's maternal aunt
- Dilsah Demir as Pelin: Kenan's assistant
- Buse Altıntaş as Buse: Murat's cousin; Samet's girlfriend
- Burak Dumanoğlu as Refik's subordinate
- Egemen Ulutaş as Mert: Leyla's assistant
- Yasemin Akyüz as Hajer: Gediz family's househelp
- Kirkor Dinckayikçi as Reşat: Gediz family's househelp

== Episodes ==
=== List of episodes ===
No.	Title	Directed by	Written by	Original release date
1	TBA	Neslihan Yeşilyurt	Ethem Özışık	11 September 2023
Leyla Gediz, the prosecutor, has recently returned to Istanbul and is unaware of how the case she was given on the first day and the guy she met that day will alter her life. In a murder investigation that rocked Turkey as a country, Leyla becomes the lead. Turan, the top prosecutor in the case against Leyla, is the father of Turkey's most popular news presenter, Kenan Öztürk, who is also heavily engaged. In order to resist their desire and go together on the path of inquiry, Kenan and Leyla, whose fates frequently collide, must overcome their attraction to one another. They don't realise the murderer is so near, though.
2	TBA	Neslihan Yeşilyurt	Ethem Özışık	18 September 2023
As Leyla's trust circle shrinks, the body count rises. Turan, desperate to save his son, becomes a prosecutor defending the killer. Kenan faces a choice.
3	TBA	Neslihan Yeşilyurt	Ethem Özışık	25 September 2023
Leyla suspects a connection between Kenan and Doğan, and he went too far. When Kenan regained consciousness and learned what he had done, he tried to forgive himself, but softening Leyla's anger was not easy. Kenan, whose memory lapses were becoming more frequent, began to doubt his sanity, and he wasn't the only one who noticed this. Doğan, who failed to kill his last victim, took unexpected risks to prevent İrfan from talking. As Kenan's trust eroded, Leyla and Commissioner Refik played a dangerous game to confirm the killer's connection to Kenan. This time, it was Doğan's turn to fall into the trap.
4	TBA	Neslihan Yeşilyurt	Ethem Özışık	2 October 2023
Despite İrfan being silenced at the last moment, some will not stay quiet in the face of cruelty. Leyla, unaware her own father is involved, seeks the truth behind murders from September 7, 1995. She teams up with Kenan, discovering a new side to him. Ekrem, unaware he's on Doğan's radar, faces escalating pressure and dangerous involvement. Turan, preoccupied with his own worries, faces a greater concern than his son's imprisonment. As Ekrem tries to shield his kids from the truth, he overlooks imminent danger. Kenan, dealing with repressed pain, turns to an unusual path for answers.
5	TBA	Neslihan Yeşilyurt	Ethem Özışık	9 October 2023
Leyla and Kenan are caught in a fierce battle between those trying to cover up a fire at the orphanage and those trying to expose it. They realize their enemies are unafraid and their past lives are threatened. An unexpected emotional confession complicates matters. Turan tries to protect his son while Nevin learns disturbing information about Kenan's mental health. Doğan, determined to reclaim what's his, takes extreme measures. İdris, unable to control Doğan's impulsiveness, resorts to harsh methods, making Ekrem Doğan's prime target.
6	TBA	Neslihan Yeşilyurt	Ethem Özışık	16 October 2023
After all the things that happened to them, Kenan can no longer hide his love for Leyla. However, Leyla struggles to open up about her love that she has accepted within herself. The suppressed intensity of emotions leads the two to inevitable confessions.
7	TBA	Neslihan Yeşilyurt	Ethem Özışık	23 October 2023
After a disaster occurs at the courthouse, Leyla takes one step away from reality again. However, a clue found after the incident determines the new target of the investigation. Nevin, who reveals the facts to the wrong person, begins to think that she has no choice but to accept Doğan as her son. Turan, who, unlike his wife, cannot accept Doğan, has a striking confrontation with Idris.
8	TBA	Neslihan Yeşilyurt	Ethem Özışık	30 October 2023
For the first time, Leyla stops resisting her love for Kenan. The couple thinks they will enjoy their love. Until their fate takes a dark turn...
9	TBA	Neslihan Yeşilyurt	Ethem Özışık	6 November 2023
Leyla, devastated by her father's murder, relentlessly pursues Ekrem's killers. Doğan, accused of the crime, confronts İdris, while Nevin and Turan grapple with a crucial decision. As the criminal organization targets Leyla, Elif's courage unveils their schemes. Meanwhile, Tahir, emotionally affected, seeks solace at Yasemin's door, and familial power struggles ensue.
10	TBA	Neslihan Yeşilyurt	Ethem Özışık	13 November 2023
Kidnapped Leyla gets closer to solving her father's murder. Doğan risks exposure to help her, bringing victory within reach. Şahinde juggles threats and family pressures. Tahir takes charge amid chaos. Doğan's bold move exposes family betrayal, leaving Turan and Nevin to deal with the aftermath. Kenan takes a significant step in his relationship with Leyla, unaware of impending complications.
11	TBA	Neslihan Yeşilyurt	Ethem Özışık	20 November 2023
Kenan disappears for treatment, leaving a trail of heartbreak. Leyla seeks answers for the sudden abandonment. Yasemin advises moving on, but a new person wants to join Leyla's journey. Misunderstandings strain Yasemin and Murat. Tahir faces crises in personal and professional life, while Nuray plays games to keep him. An unexpected return changes the narrative, and a new presence is set to forever alter Kenan and Leyla's lives.
12	TBA	Neslihan Yeşilyurt	Ethem Özışık	27 November 2023
Kenan tries not to lose Leyla amid her anger, while Leyla attempts to move on without him. A familiar face ensures their paths cross again. An unwanted guest adds tension in the Gediz household, revealing new challenges. Müşerref searches for her lost son, unaware he's closer than she thinks. Turan's honest move to reveal the past's truths has unforeseen consequences, pushing Nevin into a dark path when she doesn't find the understanding she seeks from her husband.
13	TBA	Neslihan Yeşilyurt	Ethem Özışık	8 December 2023
A third person try to propose Leyla that making jealous to kenan. Leyla accepted a formal date with him for making kenan jealous. Kenan went into the date. At the end of date night Leyla answered no him politely. Kenan observed it. Next day Leyla found out from a plumber that the house which she is living in, it’s actually belong to Kenan Ozturk. This made Leyla furious that kenan told me lie since beginning but kenan tried to change her mind. Leyla back to her father home. Kenan reached there with a woman's case who is asking help to find her lost kid yusuf.
14	TBA	Neslihan Yeşilyurt	Ethem Özışık	15 December 2023
Kenan started to investigate about the yusuf case. He went to the women house & felt a strange attachment with her. Another side Turan told navin that kenan real mother finding him. Navin became sick for the fear of losing kenan. Kenan went to met navin to the hospital & Leyla also appeared there. Navin said to Leyla that how much kenan love her .leyla felt her words but still remain angry that makes kenan depressed & he went to leyla’s parents home & asked sorry & tried to hear her inside voice that “ she still love him so much “ but Leyla told you can’t love me as your wish again leave me as your wish. kenan don’t hearing so she locked him into the jail for one night. Next day Leyla order to let kenan out from jail. Kenan went to home and started to search in the home where Leyla was staying. He understood that Dogan was making this home for his hidden treasure. Kenan got a phone in Dogan phone & he learned a man called idris was in trap.
15	TBA	Neslihan Yeşilyurt	Ethem Özışık	15 December 2023
Kenan went to the place where they trapped idris. Kenan didn’t recognise idris but started to argument with the gang & suddenly they hit him on head and instantly Dogan back. He started fight with the gang & saved idris life. Another side Leyla got a pen drive through jail control room because they knew that kenan Ozturk is their madam boyfriend so the control room told Leyla that we got the pen drive from mr kenan last night but he forgot to take it back before leaving the place.Leyla took the pen drive, suddenly she thought May be she can get hints in the pen drive why suddenly kenan left her. when she open the pen drive she got the statement of Dogan. Leyla became shocked knowing about kenan personality disorder. She immediately went to a doctor appointment. Doctor discussed with her briefly that kenan doesn’t know anything but Dogan is culprit. Leyla started to feel dizzy but she controlled herself. Leyla immediately make an arrest warrant in the name of Dogan & order to arrest kenan while Dogan was planning to kill his uncle who kidnapped him in childhood with the help of idris. Leyla caught him up .
16	TBA	Neslihan Yeşilyurt	Ethem Özışık	15 December 2023
In the recording cells Dogan accepted that yes he killed them because they were criminals, nobody could stop them Because they used their power for crime so he killed them while she was sleeping on kenan bed .what you will do now, kenan love you a lot. Leyla don’t understand what she will do she went out from the recording room .Dogan asleep. After a few minutes later kenan wake up & don’t understand what is happening with him. Leyla came back & realised that now in front of her it’s kenan. She became emotional. Suddenly Turan came with permission of high authorities for discharged kenan. Leyla couldn’t stop him because he is senior officer. Dogan was making to kill his uncle where navin & kenan real mother planned to let kenan go away. They made a plan & hired a delivery van. They both kissed their son & let him put into the van asked the driver to cross him the river so he could escape from Leyla but Dogan had another plan after a few minutes he put off from the van & took a motorcycle went back to his uncle house for killing him who ordered idris to kill yusuf aka kenan aka him but idris just kidnapped him & left him in a orphanage which was buried by Leyla’s criminal father. By the way Dogan successfully killed him even after a tight security. Leyla took the car behind Dogan bike & She shot his leg. Dogan talked with kenan (himself) that my work is done, i don’t know how to handle her. Kenan come to sense but he was in fear that if Dogan back then he will kill Leyla so he put off all the bullet from guns then he come out in front of Leyla. Here the most emotional conversation between them. Leyla told “ i don’t care you Dogan or kenan just slander, after that I will always with you every second every hours I will be with you, just slander “Kenan said “ leyla Dogan is right, what Dogan did after that do you think they will let me release. In my story is like that I actually never was there, there was always a hole. But in between if anything was truth that is I love you very much .According his plan he showed Leyla that he was going to shoot her but actually he didn’t. he knew that Leyla can’t handle the game & he was right. Leyla shoot in panic thinking that kenan is shooting him “Kenan slipped his legs & fall into the river. Leyla shouted with the name of kenan. Later she realised that kenan put off his all bullets. She realised first time in life the truth of law that laws hand and eyes are blind, they can’t give justice. she thought always that she is righteous but actually she didn’t catch the right in search of giving justice to criminal. Most importantly she didn’t believe her love that he never will harm her. She realised that into her love was boundaries right or wrong etc but kenan love her with whole of her. He loves for who she is. He accepted her as she is. He accepted her with her short temper, he accepted her with her all flows which she never able to see into herself. She realised actually “ what is true love ?”Story sifted four five months later where Leyla looking devastated, she came to check up with a woman therapist. Leyla confessed that she left her loving job (which is no more valuable for her) soon after that day & now she doesn’t want to live, she want to go only beside kenan. She want to love kenan. She want only one kenan. Now this Leyla is the one who actually love kenan from her heart & soul but she is dying in search of him. She is becoming sick in the pain of losing kenan .Doctor asked take medicine that will make you help to forget kenan. Leyla rejected and said that I never ever want to forget him and left the camber.She brought a ticket of newZealand. Before leaving Istanbul last time she came to the place where Leyla confessed her love toward kenan suddenly somebody passed beside her and left a folded note. She took the note & tried to look him but she just looked back of a man wearing a hoodie running out fast. She opened the note & started smiling again after months. Into the note kenan messaged her that “ we will never ever be two strangers “

== Production ==
=== Casting ===
Hande Erçel and Burak Deniz reunited onscreen for Bambaşka Biri, marking their second collaboration after Aşk Laftan Anlamaz (2016). Deniz and Cem Davran had previously worked in Yarım Kalan Aşklar (2020), making their second collaboration onscreen too.

=== Development ===
Initially titled İki Yabancı, which means Two Strangers in English, the series was launched with the title Bambaşka Biri.

Fox Turkey announced that Neslihan Yeşilyurt would be directing it and that it would star Hande Erçel and Burak Deniz.

=== Filming ===
Bambaşka Biri is primarily filmed in Istanbul, Turkey. Certain scenes are shot in locations such as Beşiktaş and Galata.

== Reception ==
=== Ratings ===
The series has trended on Twitter with more than 300,000 tweets. Episode seven of the show increased in the commercial demo by 8%.

== Awards and nominations ==
Bambaşka Biri is the first Turkish series to receive an award at the Rose d'Or Awards. It was selected from more than 700 projects in 13 different categories.

Year	Award	Category	Nominee	Result	Reference
2023	Rose d'Or Awards	Best Telenovela	Bambaşka Biri	Won	
2023	Distinctive International Arab Festivals Awards	Best International Actor	Burak Deniz	Won	
2023	Eurexpo Festiculture	Most Popular Actor of the Year	Burak Deniz	Won	
2023	Golden Butterfly Awards	Best Actor	Burak Deniz	Nominated	
2023	Golden Butterfly Awards	Best Actress	Hande Erçel	Nominated	
2023	Golden Butterfly Awards	Best Couple	Burak Deniz and Hande Erçel	Nominated	
2023	Golden Butterfly Awards	Best Series	Bambaşka Biri	Nominated	
2023	Golden Butterfly Awards	Best Director	Neslihan Yeşilyurt	Nominated	
2023	Golden Butterfly Awards	Best Screenwriter	Ethem Özışık	Nominated	
2023	Mevcut Bilgi Yilin En'leri Ödülleri	Best Actor of the Year	Burak Deniz	Nominated	
2023	Mevcut Bilgi Yilin En'leri Ödülleri	Best Actress of the Year	Hande Erçel	Nominated	
2023	Mevcut Bilgi Yilin En'leri Ödülleri	Best Couple of the Year	Burak Deniz and Hande Erçel	Nominated	
2023	Mevcut Bilgi Yilin En'leri Ödülleri	Best Series of the Year	Bambaşka Biri	Nominated	
2023	Mevcut Bilgi Yilin En'leri Ödülleri	Best Screenwriter of the Year	Ethem Özışık	Nominated	
2023	Mevcut Bilgi Yilin En'leri Ödülleri	Best Music of the Year	Bambaşka Biri	Nominated	
2024	Seoul International Drama Awards	Best Series	Bambaşka Biri	Won	

== See also ==
- Television in Turkey
- List of Turkish television series
- Turkish television drama
