= Rojda Demirer =

Turkish actress of Kurdish origin (born 1980)

- Born: 12 August 1980 (age 45); Ankara, Turkey
- Occupations: Movie, TV and voice actress
- Years active: 2002–present

Rojda Demirer (born 12 August 1980) is a Turkish actress of Kurdish origin.

== Early years ==
Demirer was born in Ankara to a Kurdish family originally from Diyarbakır; her father was a descendant of Sheikh Said from the Raman tribe. Her cousin is actress Belçim Bilgin. Her father died of cancer when she was seven years old, after which she was raised by her mother alongside her older sister, Ruken Demirer, who is also an actress. While her first name means "sunrise" in Kurdish.

At the age of eight, Demirer began performing in children's programming for the state-owned TRT Radio Ankara. She later attended the Hacettepe University Ankara State Conservatory, graduating with a degree in drama in 2001.

== Career ==
Following her university graduation, Demirer joined the Trabzon State Theatre, performing there from 2003 to 2008.

In 2010, she won the "Best Supporting Actress in a Youth Television Series" accolade at the İsmail Cem Television Awards for her role in the Show TV youth drama series Melekler Korusun.

In addition to her acting career, Demirer co-founded a boutique chocolate brand, "Marie-Antoinette Chocolate," alongside her sister Ruken Demirer. Located in the Nişantaşı neighborhood of Istanbul, the establishment was named in memory of the French queen.

== Filmography ==
Movies
Year	Title	Role	Notes
2002	Gönderilmemiş Mektuplar	Ceren	Leading actress
2012	KAOS - Örümcek Ağı	Meltem	Leading actress
2019	Geniş Aile Komşu Kızı	Zeynep	Leading actress
Television series
2022–2023	O Kız	Melek	Channel : Kanal D
2022	Son Nefesime Kadar	Gökçe	Channel : FOX
2021	Maraşlı	Firuzan Türel	Channel: ATV
2020	Saygı	Hasret Yakar	Network: BluTV
2018–2019	Çarpışma	Belma	Channel: Show TV
2017	Adı Efsane	Seçil	Channel: Kanal D
2016	Kördüğüm	Neslihan	
2015	Acil Aşk Aranıyor	Ayla	Supporting actress, Channel: Show TV
2014	Yedikule Hayat Yokuşu	Süreyya / Sultan	
2012–2013	Alev Alev	Alev	Leading actress, Channel: ATV
2011–2012	Elde Var Hayat	Elif	Leading actress, Channel: TRT 1
2010–2011	Geniş Aile	Zeynep Meyveli	Leading actress, Channel: Kanal D and Star TV
2009–2010	Melekler Korusun	Esin Kömürcü Tülek	Leading actress, Channel: Show TV
2007	Sevgili Dünürüm	Ayperi	Leading actress, Channel: Star TV
2006	Hisarbuselik	Sema	Supporting actress, Channel: TRT 1
2006	Yaşanmış Şehir Hikayeleri	Zeynep	Leading actress, Channel: Kanal D
2006	Candan Öte	Görkem	Leading actress, Channel: Star TV
2005	Tadımız Kaçmasın	Eda	Leading actress, Channel: Kanal D
2004	Ağa Kızı	Biricik	Leading actress, Channel: Kanal D
2004	Canım Benim	Demet	Leading actress, Channel: ATV
2003	Aşk Olsun	Ebru	Leading actress, Channel: Kanal D
2002	Eyvah Hamiyet Teyze		
