= Çağiran =

Çağıran is a surname of Turkish origin. Notable with the surname include:

- Evren Çağıran (born 1993), Turkish compound archer
- Merve Çağıran (born 1992), Turkish actress
- Musa Çağıran (born 1992), Turkish footballer
- Rahman Buğra Çağıran (born 1995), Turkish footballer
