= Alina Boz =

Russian-Turkish actress (born 1998)

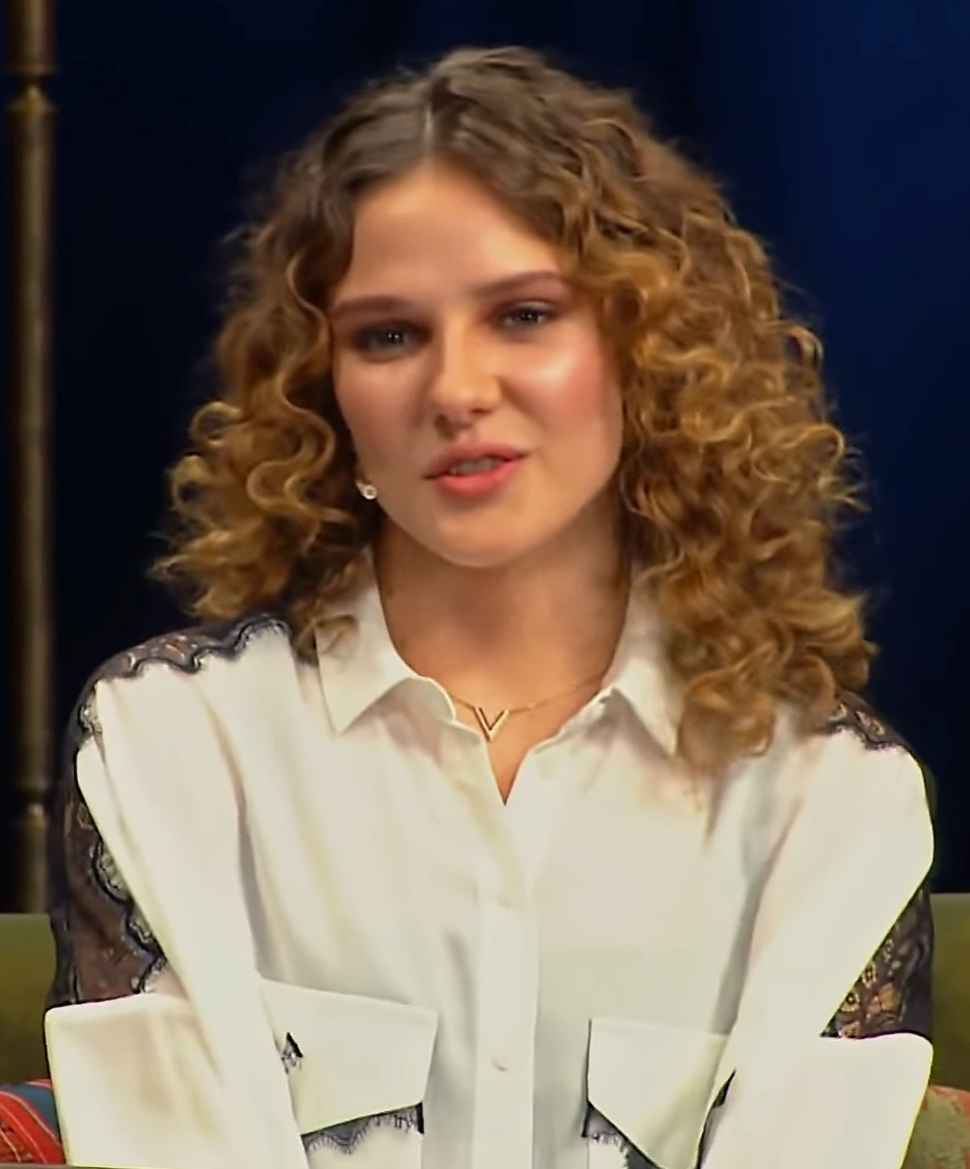
- Boz on Tolga Çevik's Tolgshow in 2018
- Born: 14 June 1998 (age 28); Moscow, Russia
- Occupation: Actress
- Years active: 2013–present
- Spouse: Umut Evirgen (m. 2023)
- Awards: 2020 Shining Star – Golden Butterfly Awards

Alina Boz (Russian: Алина Боз; born 14 June 1998) is a Russian-Turkish actress. She gained recognition for her work as Eda in the Netflix series Aşk 101 and Mahur Türel in the TV series Maraşlı.

== Early life ==
Alina Boz was born on 14 June 1998 in Moscow, Russia, to Turkish father and Russian mother. Her paternal grandparents were among the Turkish minority in Bulgaria and then immigrated from Bulgaria to Turkey (also known as Bulgarian Turk). Boz was seven when her family moved to Turkey due to her father's new job. There she learned Turkish and attended primary school. She speaks Turkish, Russian and English. She studied at Private Gökjet Aviation High School. She began her dance career in the dance theatre. Before starting her acting career, Boz worked as a model on commercials and magazines.

== Career ==
Before commencing her acting career, Boz worked in several commercials. She started her acting career at the age of fifteen in the 2013 series Cesur Hemşire as Canan. In 2014, she starred in the series Paramparça and depicted the character of Hazal along with actress Nurgül Yeşilçay. In 2016, she appeared in the movie Kaçma Birader and portrayed the character of Melis Kahvaci. In 2017, Boz had a role in the movie Böluk and also worked in the series Sevdanın Bahçesi as Defne. In 2018, she was cast in the series Vatanım Sensin as Princess Anastasia Romanova, and in the same year she had a leading role as Azra Güneş in the series Elimi Bırakama.

Boz had a leading role in the Netflix original series Aşk 101 and portrayed the character of "Eda". In 2021, she starred as Mahur Türel opposite Burak Deniz in the television series Maraşlı. In 2021, she signed a contract for the brand Duru, she received 1 million Turkish lira for the deal. The commercial was shot in Bursa. Simultaneously, Boz starred in the sequel of Aşk 101, which premiered on 30 September 2021 on Netflix.

In 2021, she was cast in the movie Bandırma Füze Kulübü and depicted the leading female role of Leyla, the movie was set in the late 1950s and focused on a group of qualified students who began constructing missiles. In 2022, Boz starred in the short film Babamın Öldüğü Gün and depicted the character of Hale, who was the coping the death of her father, with her sister Sema, portrayed by Nur Fettahoğlu. She later joined Bir Zamanlar Istanbul, as Seher Nazar, a Bozdağ Film Production on TRT1 opposite Ali Tuna which ran for 19 episodes. In December 2025, Boz joined Turkish historical fiction TV series Kuruluş: Orhan, in the leading role of Asporça Hatun, one of the wives of Orhan Gazi opposite actor Mert Yazıcıoğlu.

== Personal life ==
On 2 December 2023, Alina married her longtime partner film producer Umut Evirgen in Istanbul. One of the witnesses and wedding guest was Turkish actress Özge Özpirinçci. In August 2026, it was revealed that she was pregnant with the couple's first child, a girl.

== Filmography ==
Film
Year	Title	Role
2016	Kaçma Birader	Melis Kahvaci
2017	Bölük	Eylül
2022	Bandırma Füze Külübü	Leyla
2022	Yılbaşı Gecesi	Ada
Short film
Year	Title	Role
2022	Babamın Öldüğü Gün	Hale
Web series
Year	Title	Role
2020–2021	Aşk 101	Eda Karacaoğlu
TV series
Year	Title	Role
2013	Cesur Hemşire	Canan
2014–2017	Paramparça	Hazal Gürpınar
2017	Vatanım Sensin	Princess Anastasia Romanova
2017	Sevda'nın Bahçesi	Defne
2018–2019	Elimi Bırakma	Azra Güneş/Azra Çelen
2021	Maraşlı	Mahur Türel
2022	Bir Peri Masalı	Zeynep/Melis
2025	Bir Zamanlar Istanbul	Seher Nacar
2025–2026	Kuruluş: Orhan	Asporça Hatun
