= Serra Pirinç =

Turkish actress

- Born: Aleyna Serra Pirinç; 19 June 1997 (age 29); Istanbul, Turkey
- Occupation: Actress
- Years active: 2017–present

Serra Pirinç (born 19 June 1997) is a Turkish actress.

== Life and career ==
Serra Pirinç was born on 19 June 1997 in Istanbul, Turkey as Aleyna Serra Pirinç. After completing her High school education, she focused on her acting career, and studied from Theater Terrace. Today, it continues its activities under the agency of Rezzan Çankır Acting agency. In 2017, she started her acting career, she portrayed the character of Müjde in the serial Bizim Hikaye, which was broadcast on FOX. She got fame from her very first project. In 2018, she made her second debut in the series Vuslat as depicting the character of Ceylan Çağlar. In 2019, she made minor appearance in the series Mucize Doktor. The show starred Taner Ölmez, Reha Özcan and others. On April 9 2026, she was detained as part of a public figures named in a drug investigation, and although she tested positive, she was later released.

== Filmography ==
Television
Year	Title	Role	Notes
2017-2018	Bizim Hikaye	Müjde	Supporting Role
2018-2019	Vuslat	Ceylan Çağlar	Supporting Role
2020	Mucize Doktor	Nil	Guest Star
2021	Öğrenci Evi	Ceyda	Leading Role
2021	Kağıt Ev	Ela	Supporting Role
2021	Saklı	Su	Supporting Role
2022	Tozluyaka	Zeyno Sarı	Leading Role
2023	Benim Güzel Ailem	Damla Akyol	Leading Role
2024	Yalan	Hazal	Leading Role
