= Maraşlı (TV series) =

Turkish TV action series

- Also known as: The Trusted
- Genre: Action
- Written by: Ethem Özışık; Hakan Bonomo; Ercan Uğur
- Directed by: Arda Sarigun
- Starring: Burak Deniz; Alina Boz
- Country of origin: Turkey
- Original language: Turkish
- No. of seasons: 1
- No. of episodes: 26

Production
- Producers: Timur Savcı; Burak Sağyaşar
- Production location: Istanbul
- Production companies: TIMS & B Productions

Original release
- Network: ATV
- Release: January 11 – July 13, 2021

Maraşlı is a Turkish action series by TIMS & B Productions that premiered on ATV in January 2021, starring Burak Deniz and Alina Boz.

== Plot ==
Maraşlı is a retired soldier turned bookstore owner. For Maraşlı, life changed drastically after his daughter, Zeliş, was shot. One day, a photographer named Mahur enters Maraşlı's bookstore, and on that same day, she involuntarily gets involved in an incident involving the mafia. Maraşlı saves her life and from that day onwards, their fates become linked. Maraşlı saves Mahur's life several times. He discovers that the operation in which his daughter was shot was orchestrated by someone from the Türel family. As a result, he intentionally helps save Mahur's life from Savaş, one of the main villains of the drama. Mahur begins to fall in love with Maraşlı. At first, Maraşlı shows no sign of affection for Mahur, but as time goes on, he finds himself falling in love with her. The Türel family faces danger, and Maraşlı helps them escape the threat. However, Mahur's father and younger brother are eventually killed, and Maraşlı is arrested for it.

Mahur's older brother, Necati, portrays himself as a drunk who is only interested in books. However, he secretly runs a criminal organization. He believes he is the son of Ömer, the lover of Mahur's mother, and the father of Savaş. In the past, Necati shot Ömer, and since then, he has believed he killed his real father, Ömer. For this reason, he seeks revenge on the Türels and helps Savaş. Necati was the real mastermind behind the operation in which Zeliş was shot. He was also assigned to carry out the operation to kill Mehmet İnce by Hurdacı. Later, it is revealed that Necati is the true son of Aziz, Mahur's father. Learning this truth shocks Necati, and he becomes mentally unstable.

After being released from jail, Maraşlı continues to investigate who was really behind the operation. In the end, he discovers that Hurdacı, the real father of Mehmet İnce, ordered the killing of Mehmet İnce, during which Zeliş was shot. It is also revealed that Maraşlı is an imaginary persona created to uncover the truth. Mehmet İnce, who had taken on the identity of Maraşlı, now struggles with dissociative identity disorder. As Mahur loves Maraşlı, he chooses to remain Maraşlı and forgets who Mehmet İnce is. In the end, Mahur's strong love helps Maraşlı rediscover his real identity as Mehmet İnce.

Mahur falls in love with Mehmet İnce again, and they continue to enjoy their happy life together.

== Cast ==
Actor	Character	Episodes	Description
Burak Deniz	Celâl "Maraşlı" Kün/Mehmet İnce	1-26	He is a retired non-commissioned officer from special forces. He is secretly working for National Intelligence Organization. He is the ex-husband of Hilal and the father of Zeliş. He saved Mahur Türel and her family members' life many times. Gradually, he fell in love with Mahur Türel.
Alina Boz	Mahur Türel	1-26	She is the daughter of the rich businessman Aziz Türel. She studied photography outside of her career. She is a photographer.
Serhat Kılıç	Necati Türel	1-26	He is the son of Aziz Türel. Ilhan and Mahur's brother. He is a graduate of philosophy. He is an alcoholic.
Kerem Atabeyoğlu	Aziz Türel	1-18	He is the father of Mahur, Necati and İlhan. He is the owner of plane company Türel Air. He married Firuzan after his wife died. Savaş killed him and İlhan by knife.
Rojda Demirer	Firuzan Türel	1-18	She is the wife of Aziz Türel.
Saygın Soysal	Savaş Yıldırım	1-26	He is an EPP patient. He is the enemy of the Türel family. He knows how to use people's weaknesses.
Cemil Büyükdöğerli	İlhan Türel	1-18	He is the son of Aziz Türel. He is the brother of Mahur and brother of Necati. He is Dilşad's husband and father of Oghuz. He runs his father's company. He's a workaholic. Savaş killed him and his father Aziz Türel by knife.
Melis İşiten	Dilşad Türel	1-18	She is Ilhan's wife. She is the mother of Oguz. He has a secret relationship with the Ozan.
Hakan Altıner	Müdür	1-	He is the police chief.
Cihan Yenici	Ozan	1-10	He is Ilhan's childhood friend. He is Mahur's ex. He has a secret relationship with Dilşad. He is working for Savaş. He wants to replace İlhan. İlhan Killed him after learning of his relationship with his wife Dilşad.
Cengiz Sezgin	Sadık	1-26	He is the driver of the Türel Family.
Nesrin Yılmaz	Nuran	1-26	She is the maid of the Türel Family. She is Sadık's wife..
Türkü Su Demirel	Behiye	1-26	She is the daughter of Sadık and Nuran. Servant of the Türel Family. She is interested in Necati.
Muhammad Abdullah	Ali	1-	He is the Victim of Savaş.
Bedriye Rosa Çelik	Zeliş	1-26	She is the daughter of Maraşlı.
Nihal Dinçel	Şirin	1-11	She looks after Maraşlı's housework and Zeliş.
Mert Ateş	Oğuz Türel	1-18	He is the son of İlhan and Dilşad.
Sinem Akyol	Hilal	1-26	The commissioner who helped Maraşlı in the concert attack.She is Maraşlı's Ex-wife and mother of Zeliş.
Neslihan Acar	Sedef	1-19	Ömer's lover is Aziz Türel's wife. Sedef is the mother of Necati, İlhan and Mahur.
Gizem Kala	Ecem	1-26	She is Mahur's friend from her workplace.
Özgür Koç	Nevzat	1-26	He is one of the soldiers of Marasli. He helps Marasli in daily life.

== Episodes ==
First Season (2021)

Order in the series	Title	Director	Release date
1	1 Episode	Arda Sarıgün	11 January 2021
2	2 Episode	Arda Sarıgün	18 January 2021
3	3 Episode	Arda Sarıgün	25 January 2021
4	4 Episode	Arda Sarıgün	1 February 2021
5	5 Episode	Arda Sarıgün	8 February 2021
6	6 Episode	Arda Sarıgün	15 February 2021
7	7 Episode	Arda Sarıgün	22 February 2021
8	8 Episode	Arda Sarıgün	1 March 2021
9	9 Episode	Arda Sarıgün	8 March 2021
10	10 Episode	Arda Sarıgün	15 March 2021
11	11 Episode	Arda Sarıgün	22 March 2021
12	12 Episode	Arda Sarıgün	29 March 2021
13	13 Episode	Arda Sarıgün	12 April 2021
14	14 Episode	Arda Sarıgün	19 April 2021
15	15 Episode	Arda Sarıgün	26 April 2021
16	16 Episode	Arda Sarıgün	3 May 2021
17	17 Episode	Arda Sarıgün	10 May 2021
18	18 Episode	Arda Sarıgün	17 May 2021
19	19 Episode	Arda Sarıgün	24 May 2021
20	20 Episode	Arda Sarıgün	31 May 2021
21	21 Episode	Arda Sarıgün	7 June 2021
22	22 Episode	Arda Sarıgün	14 June 2021
23	23 Episode	Arda Sarıgün	21 June 2021
24	24 Episode	Arda Sarıgün	29 June 2021
25	25 Episode	Arda Sarıgün	5 July 2021
26	26 Episode (Final)	Arda Sarıgün	12 July 2021
