= Yağız Can Konyalı =

Turkish film actor

- Born: 20 September 1991 (age 34); Istanbul, Turkey
- Education: Mimar Sinan University State Conservatory
- Occupation: Actor
- Years active: 2006–present

Yağız Can Konyalı (born 20 September 1991) is a Turkish actor. He is mainly known for his role as Rahmet Elibol in the television series Bizim Hikaye.

== Filmography ==
Year	Title	Type	Role
2006	İlk Aşk	Film	Alp
2010	Öyle Bir Geçer Zaman ki	TV series	Aydın
2013	Kor	Short film	
2015	Adı Mutluluk	TV series	Zeki
2015	Takım: Mahalle Aşkına	Film	Turgay
2016	Ateş	Film	Ayaz Yılmaz
2017–2019	Bizim Hikaye	TV series	Rahmet Elibol
2019	Aşk Ağlatır	TV series	Rüzgâr Özben
2020–2021	Arıza	TV series	Mert Altay
2020	AV The Hunt	Film	Aziz
2021	Fatma	Web series	Berkan
2022	Erkek Severse	Web series	Cenk
2022	Hakim	TV series	Metehan Demirkıran
2022	Tuzak	TV series	Mete Gümüşay

== Awards ==
Year	Award	Category	Work	Result
2015	Antalya Golden Orange Film Festival	Behlül Dal Jury Special Award	Takım: Mahalle Aşkına	Won
2019	Latina Turkish Awards	Best Supporting Actor	Bizim Hikaye	Won
