= Your Eyes Tell =

2020 Japanese film

- Directed by: Takahiro Miki
- Screenplay by: Yūichi Toyone
- Based on: the 2011 South Korea film Always, which was inspired by the 1931 American film City Lights
- Starring: Yuriko Yoshitaka; Ryusei Yokohama; Kyōsuke Yabe; Ryōsei Tayama; Tōru Nomaguchi; Yoshinori Okada; Keita Machida; Jun Fubuki
- Cinematography: Mitsuru Komiyama
- Edited by: Tatsuya Yanagisawa
- Music by: Mio-sotido
- Production companies: Dragonfly Entertainment, Hachinoji
- Distributed by: Gaga
- Release date: October 23, 2020 (Japan)
- Running time: 123 minutes
- Country: Japan
- Language: Japanese

Your Eyes Tell (Japanese: きみの瞳が問いかけている, Hepburn: Kimino mega toikaketeiru) is a 2020 Japanese drama romance film, being a remake of the 2011 South Korean film Always. It is directed by Takahiro Miki and written by Yuichi Toyone.

== Plot ==
A car accident leads to Akari going blind, and in the same accident, she loses her parents. However, she continues life and learns to adapt. She accidentally meets Rui Shinozaki, a former kick boxer, who works in a car park. He is a talented kickboxer, who has a dark past associated with crime, and has chosen to remain distant from society because of it. He returns to the kickboxing world, and starts to train. Meanwhile, they start a relationship, but Rui soon learns that he was connected to the reason that Akari goes blind. He endeavours to make amends, through the kickboxing world, and reconnects with his dark past. Akari's sight has complications, and she needs surgery she cannot afford. Eventually he fights in a match to get the prize money to pay for the operation that will cure her blindness.

== Cast ==
- Yuriko Yoshitaka as Akari Kashiwagi
- Ryusei Yokohama as Rui Shinozaki
- Kyōsuke Yabe as Jin Harada
- Ryōsei Tayama as Chairman Ouchi
- Tōru Nomaguchi as Takafumi Ozaki
- Yoshinori Okada as Susumu Sakamoto
- Eita Okuno as Mitsuru Kuji
- Hannya as Kanai
- Akane Sakanoue as Keiko Tsunomori
- Kanna Moriya as Maiko
- Keita Machida as Kyōsuke Sakuma
- Jun Fubuki as Mieko Ooura

== Production ==
The film was shot in Japan. Music was contributed by the band BTS. Production of the film commenced in October 2019. The film was distributed by the Gaga Corporation and released on 23 October 2020.

== See also ==
- List of films about boxing
