= Bizim Hikaye =

Turkish drama serial

- Written by: Hatice Meryem; Banu Kiremitçi Bozkurt; Ebru Hacıoğlu; Verda Pars
- Directed by: Serdar Gözelekli (1–37); Koray Kerimoğlu (38–70)
- Starring: Burak Deniz; Hazal Kaya; Reha Özcan
- Country of origin: Turkey
- Original language: Turkish
- No. of seasons: 2
- No. of episodes: 70 (in Slovakia 200)

Production
- Producer: Fatih Aksoy
- Production location: Istanbul
- Running time: 120 minutes
- Production company: Med Yapım

Original release
- Network: Fox
- Release: 14 September 2017 – 23 May 2019

Bizim Hikaye (English: Our Story) is a Turkish drama series starring Hazal Kaya as Filiz, a young woman who takes care of her siblings after her mother leaves them, and Burak Deniz as Barış, a mysterious man, who appears in Filiz's life. It is an adaptation of the British original series Shameless. Its first episode (in September 2017) received more than 20 million views. The show was shot in Istanbul and ran for 70 episodes. The series is currently popular in Turkey.

== Plot ==
Season 1

Filiz, 20, is a young woman in a lower-class Turkish family, forced to take care of her five younger siblings after her mother leaves and as her father, Fikri, is an alcoholic. Filiz believes that there is no place for love in her life until she meets Barış, a young man who cares for both Filiz and her family.

Meanwhile, Cemil, a police officer who is also in love with Filiz, finds out that Barış is a car thief and threatens to expose him to Filiz unless he leaves. Fikri reports the fact that his children are living without parental supervision to social services, resulting in her siblings being taken from Filiz, forcing her to marry Cemil.

Barış has a strained relationship with his father, who dislikes Filiz because she comes from a poor background. Ömer, a mafia leader, is revealed to be the husband of Yeliz, Filiz's older sister. Ömer secretly loves Filiz, but he comes to the neighborhood to find diamonds that Yeliz stole. Ömer and Servet join forces and send Filiz to jail. Filiz and Barış fall in love with each other, but their relationship faces a lot of challenges due to Barış's mysterious past and secretive life.

Season 2

Filiz is released from prison and is shocked to see that Barış has disappeared. She refuses to believe this, as Barış had written her letters, but her younger brothers reveal to her that they were the ones who wrote them so that she would not worry. Filiz finds Barış in a hospital where she finds out he has a son, Savaş Junior, and a wife. Barış tells her he used her because he was tired of married life and never really loved her. Filiz is heartbroken and gets drunk. Her lawyer Selim, who is secretly in love with her, escorts her home.

Filiz starts a business that is coincidentally right next to Barış's office. Both of them argue as Filiz does not want to leave the area, and Barış is disturbed because of the construction in her shop. Tulay loses her twins. Meanwhile, Hikmet is in love with a pregnant girl named Zeynep. He marries her and decides to raise the child as his own. He keeps her secret when Cicek, living with Filiz after coming out of prison, finds his marriage papers, and the family finds out. Tulay decides to keep Zeynep and has a soft spot for her because she is pregnant.

Savaş Junior gets a heart transplant, and Barış tells Filiz the truth that he only went back to his first wife Nihal because his son was sick; Filiz and Barış reconcile. Fikri marries a rich woman named Melek, who is dying of cancer. She spoils Kiraz and Feco badly and does not monitor them at all. Kiraz starts to act spoiled and is rude to Filiz, telling her to get out of her life. Melek goes to her mother in Switzerland and later dies. Fikri and his kids are kicked out of the house, and Filiz takes them into her own home. Kiraz stands on the roof of a construction building to enter a friend's club. Filiz, who is high with fever and tired, faints. Barış proposes to her in the hospital and she accepts. Nihal threatens to imprison Filiz if Barış does not return to her but Barış fakes his death in front of Nihal and marries Filiz. Hikmet leaves the house, as he does not want Barış to live there. Merve, Barış's sister, shows up and decides to help Barış by spying on Nihal by acting as Savaş Junior's babysitter. Hikmet kidnaps a woman's child, and Barış reveals him to be bipolar. Hikmet is put in the hospital. Filiz is revealed to be pregnant. Meanwhile, Nihal discovers Barış is alive and imprisons him as Merve betrays Barış. Nihal has a brain hemorrhage, and when she gets better, she repents and moves aboard with her son.

Neslihan is introduced as Barış's colleague and former girlfriend. Rahmet sees Baris carrying Neslihan to a hotel and accuses him of cheating on Filiz. Filiz tells Barış to divorce her, and he agrees. Later Rahmet finds out it was a misunderstanding, and Barış carried Neslihan to her room because she was drunk, and he did not sleep with her. Filiz asks Barış to forgive her, but he refuses. Filiz goes to Barış's office to find out her baby's sex, and they welcome the news that they are having a girl. Fikri has a heart attack and claims Hikmet and his granddaughter saved him from death. He vows to become a super father. Hikmet is released from the hospital and comes to live with the Elibols. A month later, Cemil and Cicek get married as well as Rahmet and Deniz. Filiz gives birth to a baby girl. Fikri buys them all apartments for his granddaughter's arrival. A baby is left at their doorstep, which turns out to be Fikri's eighth child.

== Cast and characters ==
=== Main ===
Actor	Character	Episodes	Description
Hazal Kaya	Filiz Elibol Aktan	1–70	Barıș's wife and Fikri Elibol and Şükran's eldest child. When her mother abandons the family, Filiz is left with her younger siblings Rahmet, Hikmet, Fikret, Kiraz, and Ismet. When she goes to a neighbor's wedding, Barış almost crashes into her with a car. After Barış recovers Filiz's bag, he asks her to have dinner with him. She initially refuses his offer, but later accepts it. She first marries Cemil to save her four younger siblings from the social welfare department. After divorcing Cemil, she marries Barış and gives birth to a girl.
Burak Deniz	Savaş "Barış" Aktan	1–70	Filiz's husband. The son of Servet Aktan and Ayla Angın. Barış is an intelligent, hard-headed, and confident man. His real name is Savaş. He is a mysterious young man who entered Filiz's life unexpectedly. He starts off as a leader of a car theft gang but later pursues a career as a doctor. He is known to some people as Barış as he uses his younger brother's name to honor his memory. He belongs to a very rich family, but tricks Filiz into believing that he is poor in order to gain sympathy from her. He meets Filiz and falls in love with her and is affected by her strong character. Baris tries to gain her trust, but all his lies cause him to lose Filiz. He manages everything perfectly and, due to his extreme love for Filiz, she forgives him, and they continue their relationship on a good note.
Reha Özcan	Fikri Elibol	1–70	Şükran's husband. Father of Filiz, Rahmet, Kiraz, Fikret, and İsmet. Instead of working, he becomes an alcoholic. He leaves his house and children and begins to live in Şeyma's house. He contracts cirrhosis due to his alcoholism and needs a liver transplant. Filiz and Rahmet are tested to be donors for their father, but they are incompatible. Fikri later brings his daughter Yeliz, who is from another woman to their house. However, Yeliz's tissue does not match either, and she takes Fikri to another doctor, saying she can find a liver on the black market. Yeliz's doctor steals Fikri's right kidney during the surgery. The ambulance takes him to the hospital, and he is diagnosed with multiple organ failure. A dying patient in the same hospital asked that his body parts be donated after his death. The deceased patient's liver is successfully given to Fikri. In season two, he tries to be a good father to his children. In the end, he has another child.
Yağız Can Konyalı	Rahmet Elibol	1–70	Rahmet is a high school student, he is the older brother of the house. He is a successful and intelligent teenager who doesn't take his studies seriously. He uses the school and his friends to make money. Filiz worries that he will "waste away". He supports his sister in everything and is fond of his brothers. He later works at a university. Rahmet marries Deniz.
Nejat Uygur	Hikmet Elibol	1–27 / 38–56 / 70	Hikmet is a high school student, younger than Rahmet. He is an introverted, emotional, and shy boy. He works at the market and contributes to the home during his extended stay. Because he is the most similar to his mother, he is exposed the most to his father's anger. He is in love with Esra. He does not trust himself, does not like his physical appearance, and is quiet and introverted.
Zeynep Selimoğlu	Kiraz Elibol	1–70	Kiraz is a secondary school student. Kiraz's place for Fikri is separate, believing that he is the only one who loves her. Kiraz distances herself from her previous life when she goes to live with Melek, believing that her poor life brings disgrace to her.
Alp Akar	Fikret Elibol (Fiko)	1–70	Fikret is a secondary school student. After Fikri takes him with Kiraz and Ismet to Melek's house, he leaves his previous lifestyle and house, though he changes his attitude later on.
Ömer Sevgi	İsmet Elibol (İsmo)	1–70	The youngest boy in the house.
Nesrin Cavadzade	Tülay Sertkaya	1-53	The Elibols' neighbor and Filiz's best friend. She works part-time at a nursing home. She marries her lover, Tufan Şahin. She goes to Germany. Later she divorces Tufan because of his unexpected relation with Ferda
Mehmet Korhan Fırat	Tufan Şahin	1–70	Tülay's husband, who runs a coffee shop. He becomes a good friend of Barış. And again marries Ferda.
Mehmetcan Minciözlü	Cemil Engin	1–70	A police officer who has known Filiz since childhood. He likes Filiz and hates Barış. Filiz marries him to save her siblings from the social welfare department. Cemil did not want to divorce Filiz because he loved her, but he does as he realizes that Filiz only loves Barış and cannot compromise with Cemil. In season two, his character is portrayed as a good person. He and Barış then get along well, and he even helps Barış cover up some of his small crimes, which causes him to lose his job as a police officer. He marries Çiçek.
Evrim Doğan	Şeyma	1–37	Müjde's mother, a patient with agoraphobia. When Fikri rejects her and expresses his love for Şükran, Şeyma moves to Ankara with her daughter.
Serra Pirinç	Müjde	1–37	Rahmet's former girlfriend. Rahmet helps her in her studies. She moves to Ankara with her mother.
Sahra Şaş	Çiçek	38–70	Çiçek is Filiz's friend. After leaving prison, she lives with Filiz, whom she motivates to start a business. Çiçek marries Cemil.
Murat Bölücek	Cücü (Cüneyt)	1–70	Fikri's friend who is a street alcoholic.
Melisa Döngel	Deniz Elibol	38–70	an intelligent but unpredictable rebel of the university. She initially harasses and threatens Rahmet, but eventually marries him.
Hazal Adıyaman	Derin Çelik	38–61	She is Deniz's younger sister, she is the exact opposite of Deniz. Derin motivates Rahmet to pursue mathematics.

=== Supporting ===
Actor	Character	Episode(s)	Description
Ayşen Gruda	Aysel Elibol	32–37	Fikri's mother, grandmother of the children. She saves her grandchildren from social welfare.
Esra Bezen Bilgin	Şükran Elibol	1–20 / 27–35	The mother who left the children. She occasionally returns to the house.
Beren Gökyıldız	Ayşe	30–37	Fiko's school friend. Ayşe acts like a bully at her school, while Fiko tries to impress her.
İsmail Karagöz	Haşim	1–14	Şeyma's ex-husband, Müjde 's father.
Berkay Akın	Asım Korkmaz	1–27	Hikmet's boss who runs the market. He constantly physically abuses his wife Esra, which Hikmet cannot tolerate.
Pınar Töre	Esra	1–24	Asim's wife who is constantly abused by her husband.
Pınar Çağlar Gençtürk	Ferda	20–25/64–70	Tufan's first wife, who came back into his life.
Nilay Duru	Yeliz Elibol	21–37	Fikri's eldest daughter who lives away from the Elibol family. She is involved in illegal activities and is Zeynap's mother. The Elibol siblings have no knowledge about Yeliz's existence until Fikri calls her to their house.
Cemal Toktaş	Ömer Duraner	26–37	A mafia leader who comes to the neighborhood after Yeliz's diamonds go missing, and he buys the place where Filiz works. Ömer seems to be interested in Filiz.
Irmak Güneş	Zeynep	20–37	Yeliz's and Ömer's daughter. She loves her father despite him not initially realizing that she is his daughter.
Murat Kocacık	Murtaza	60–64	The man Barış saved in prison.
Metin Büktel	Servet Aktan	9–37 / 57–60	Barış's father and Ayla's ex-husband. He is complicit in the death of Savaş's (Barış's) younger brother, who was actually Barış. It is revealed that Ömer works for him.
Sema Atalay	Ayla Angın	9–37	Barış's mother.
Nur Berfin Çiroğlu	Merve Aktan	54–61	Barış's sister.
Olcay Yusufoğlu	Nihal	37–61	Barış's ex-wife and prosecutor, whom Barış marries again because of their child while Filiz is imprisoned. She creates a lot of problems for Elibol as she loves Barış and tries to get him.
Kemal Yavuz	Savaş Aktan	38–61	Barış's son who needs a heart transplant. He and his illness are the reasons for Barış and Nihal's reunion.
Murat Danacı	Selim Tekin	38–54	Filiz's lawyer, who takes an interest in Filiz. After Filiz's reconciliation with Barış, he sides with Nihal to destroy them both.
Can Kolukısa	Recai Hasipoğlu	59–60	Hikmet's grandfather.
Elvan Boran	Hatun	52–55	Fikri's friend and the mother of Fikri's child
Şebnem Kösten	Meral Sezgin	53–57	She is the boss of the establishment where Filiz works.
Miray Akay	Zeynep	38–54	A pregnant girl from Hikmet's school. It is decided that Zeynap's child will be adopted by Tufan and Tulay. She goes to Germany with Tulay.
Müge Su Şahin	Muzi (Muazzez)	15–28	Hikmet's girlfriend. She is in love with Hikmet.
Serap Önder	Gülsüm	40–53	Barış's assistant.
Emir Wooden Yellow	Emre	40–45	Gülsüm's nephew. He is also a thief.
Atilla Pekdemir	Lawyer	60–61	Barış's lawyer.
Yiğit Celebi	Lawyer Necati	40–53	Selim's partner and friend, a lawyer. He tips off Nihal when Selim changes his side to Barış.
Feray Darıcı	Melek	37–45	Fikri's new rich wife. She is a cancer patient. She leaves for Switzerland as her mother calls her, who later kicks Fikri and Minibols out of the big mansion. She dies due to her illness.
Başak Güröz	Hülya	24–29	Doctor, Barış's college classmate. She goes crazy in love with Barış.
Sive Senozen	Neslihan	64–70	Assistant doctor of Barış. She helps deliver Filiz and Barış's baby.

== Episodes ==
Seasons	Episodes	Start date	End date
1	1–37	September 14, 2017	June 7, 2018
2	38–70	September 13, 2018	May 23, 2019

== Production ==
=== Development ===
The idea for the project was first discussed in 2015 and its name was announced as Utanmazlar, an adaptation of the American TV series Shameless. Milliyet columnist Sina Koloğlu published an article on 16 January 2017 in which he wrote that after asking the question "How our ‘Shameless’ is going to be?" from the producer, he responded by giving examples of other Turkish adaptations and asked "Americans do it this way, well, how is it going to be for us?" The series' name was later confirmed to be Bizim Hikaye. Director Serdar Gözelekli later stated that the series would be adapted for a Turkish audience. Bizim Hikaye's script was written by Hatice Meryem and Banu Kiremitçi Bozkurt.

Gözelekli was replaced by Koray Kerimoğlu as the series' director. Banu Kiremitçi Bozkurt, who wrote the script for the first season, left the crew, and Seray Şahiner became the series' main scriptwriter.

=== Filming ===
Principal photography began on 24 July 2017 in Sarıyer, Istanbul.

=== Casting ===
In January 2017, the first actor confirmed to join the cast was Hazal Kaya, who played Filiz Elibol. On 16 June 2017, Burak Deniz was officially cast as Savaş "Barış" Aktan. On 24 July 2017, the names of all cast members were announced; Reha Özcan joined the series in the role of family's father, Fikri Elibol, while the family's mother Şükran, was said to be portrayed by Esra Bezen Bilgin. Yağız Can Konyalı, Nejat Uygur, Zeynep Selimoğlu, Alp Akar, and Ömer Sevgi joined the cast as Fikri and Şükran's children Rahmet, Hikmet, Kiraz, Fikret, and İsmet respectively. Nilay Duru joined the series as Yeliz on episode 21. Cemal Toktaş started portraying the character Ömer from episode 26. In April 2018, Beren Gökyıldız was confirmed to join the cast in episode 29 as Ayşe. It was later announced that Ayşen Gruda would also be starring in the series from episode 32 as Yedi Bela Aysel.

In the second season, Sahra Şaş, Miray Akay, Murat Danacı, Melisa Döngel and Hazal Adıyaman joined the cast as Çiçek, Zeynep, Selim, Deniz and Derin respectively.

== Broadcast ==
On 5 August 2017, the first teaser for the series was released, followed by another teaser on 22 August 2017. The first episode was broadcast on 14 September 2017 on Fox. The second season premiered on 13 September 2018.

== Reception ==
Writing for Vatan, Oya Doğan praised Gözelekli for his work on the first episode of the series, adding that he succeeded in "creating a cinematographic atmosphere." She also reacted positively to Hazal Kaya's acting, stating "While watching Filiz on the screen, I forgot [the existence of] Hazal and went deep into the story."

== International broadcasting ==
- Pakistan - The show was aired on Urdu1 being dubbed in Urdu with the title Hamari Kahani (ہماری کہانی) (The title is a translation of the original Turkish title), and the show became very popular there, leading to both Hazal Kaya and Burak Deniz especially praising the Pakistani audience via their social media accounts.
- India - The series is available on an Indian OTT Platform, called MX Player dubbed in Hindi with the English title Our Story (आवर स्टोरी).
- Bangladesh - The show began airing on Deepto TV in 2022 under the name of Our Story (আমাদের গল্পঃ). This show has been very popular since.
- Bosnia and Herzegovina on Hayat TV in 2019 as Naša Priča.
- Tanzania - This show was aired on Azam TV, azam two channel with an English title "OUR STORY". It was broadcast in a Swahili translation.
- Vietnam - The series premiered on August 4, 2023, on VTV3 as Câu chuyện tình yêu (Love Story), then re-broadcast on VTV1 from October 2, 2024.
- Slovakia - The series premiered on January 6, on TV Markíza Doma as Príbeh našej rodiny (The Story of the our family)
