= Shahmaran (TV series) =

Turkish television series

- Turkish: Şahmaran
- Genre: Fantasy; Adventure; Drama
- Based on: Şah-ı Mar by Emine Buzkan Kaynak
- Written by: Pınar Bulut
- Directed by: Umur Turagay
- Starring: Serenay Sarıkaya; Burak Deniz
- Composer: Hakan Ozer
- Country of origin: Turkey
- Original language: Turkish
- No. of seasons: 2
- No. of episodes: 14

Production
- Executive producers: Timur Savcı; Burak Sağyaşar
- Producers: Tamer Basaran; Suzan Güverte
- Production locations: Adana; Tarsus; Datça
- Cinematography: Yon Thomas
- Editors: Erhan Acar Jr.; Murat Basören; Korhan Koryurek; Aylin Tinel; Can Tumerk
- Running time: 60 minutes
- Production companies: Tims & B Productions

Original release
- Network: Netflix
- Release: 20 January 2023

Shahmaran (Turkish: Şahmaran) is a Turkish fantasy-drama Netflix series directed by Umur Turagay and written by Pınar Bulut. The show, which stars Serenay Sarıkaya and Burak Deniz in the lead roles, was released on 20 January 2023.

The show's second season was released on 8 August 2024.

== Synopsis ==
Şahsu, a psychology lecturer from Istanbul, goes to Adana for work and decides to confront her grandfather, who abandoned her mother many years ago. While there, she becomes involved with a community that worships Şahmaran, a mythical creature that is half woman, half snake, who are waiting for the completion of a historical prophecy. Her life is transformed when she meets a mysterious man named Maran.

== Cast and characters ==
- Serenay Sarıkaya as Şahsu
  - Almina Günaydın as young Şahsu
- Burak Deniz as Maran
- Mustafa Uğurlu as Davut
- Mahir Günşiray as Ural
- Mert Ramazan Demir as Cihan
- Hakan Karahan as Lakmu
- Elif Nur Kerkük as Medine
- Mehmet Bilge Aslan as Salih
- Berfu Halisdemir as Diba
- Nilay Erdönmez as Hare
- Nil Sude Albayrak as Bike
- Öznur Serçeler as Gül
- Ebru Özkan as Çavgeş
- Saadet Aksoy as Lilith (season 2)

== Episodes ==
Series	Episodes	Originally released
1	8	20 January 2023
2	6	8 August 2024

=== Season 1 (2023) ===
No. overall	No. in season	Title	Original release date
1	1	"Throes of the Earth (Dünya Sancısı)"	20 January 2023
2	2	"Things Rain Says (Yağmurun Söyledikleri)"	20 January 2023
3	3	"Unstable Equilibrium (Kararsız Denge)"	20 January 2023
4	4	"Unbearable Lightness of Believing (İnanmanın İnanılmaz Hafifliği)"	20 January 2023
5	5	"Future Changes (Gelecek Değişir)"	20 January 2023
6	6	"The Turmoil That Is Life (Hayat Gürültüsü)"	20 January 2023
7	7	"The Recurrence of Love (Aşkın Tekerrürü)"	20 January 2023
8	8	"The Snake Inside Me (İçimdeki Yılan)"	20 January 2023

=== Season 2 (2024) ===
No. overall	No. in season	Title	Original release date
9	1	"Those Who Sleep Within (Icimizde uyuyanlar)"	8 August 2024
10	2	"Festina Lente"	8 August 2024
11	3	"Love Doesn't Kill (Sevmek oldurmez)"	8 August 2024
12	4	"About Love and Death (Aska ve olume dair)"	8 August 2024
13	5	"Judgement Day (Hukum vakti)"	8 August 2024
14	6	"Cycle (Dongu)"	8 August 2024

== Reception ==
Three days after its release, the series had been watched a total of 17 million hours worldwide.

A critic at Cumhuriyet praised the cinematography and actors but was disappointed with the "dissonance" between the "reality of the region" and the characters' behaviour, citing excessive nudity and out-of-context scenes that do not match the old Turkish traditions of the region they were filmed in. The critic also likened Maran's family to the Cullens in Twilight.
