= Barış Arduç =

Turkish film actor (born 1987)

- Born: 9 October 1987 (age 38); Münsterlingen, Scherzingen, Switzerland
- Occupation: Actor
- Years active: 2011–present
- Spouse: Gupse Özay (m. 2020)
- Children: 1

Barış Arduç (born 9 October 1987) is a Swiss-Turkish television and film actor.

Born and raised in Scherzingen, Switzerland, Arduç later moved permanently to Turkey with his family. He completed his primary and secondary education in Turkey. After meeting theater artist Ayla Algan, he began his professional acting career.

He first appeared in television series such as Küçük Hanımefendi (2011), Dinle Sevgili (2011), and Pis Yedili (2011), followed by roles in Benim İçin Üzülme (2012), Bugünün Saraylısı Marisa (2013–2014), and Racon: Ailem İçin (2015).

He gained widespread recognition for his role in the series Kiralık Aşk (2015–2017). He later starred in Kuzgun and Çukur, and most recently played the lead role in the TRT 1 series Alparslan: Büyük Selçuklu (2021–2023).

== Early life ==
Bartheory Barış Arduç was born in 1987 in Scherzingen, Switzerland, to Gülay and Erol Arduç, who worked in real estate. He is of Albanian descent on his father's side. His family hails from Fatsa, Ordu, on his father's side, and Artvin on his mother's side. The middle child of three brothers, with an older brother, Onur, and a younger brother, Mert, Arduç moved to Turkey permanently at the age of eight. He completed primary school in Sakarya and Gölcük. Due to the 1999 Gölcük earthquake, his family relocated to Bolu. He attended middle school and the first year of high school in Bolu before moving to Istanbul, where he completed his secondary education.

After enrolling at Erciyes University Sports Academy in Kayseri, he returned to Istanbul after his first year, unable to adjust to university life. Arduç was actively involved in sports, including swimming, diving, football, basketball, and handball. He also worked as a lifeguard in Şile for eight years under the Turkish Underwater Sports Federation. After meeting Ayla Algan, he trained in acting at Ekol Drama and later joined the Sadri Alışık Theater, marking the start of his professional acting career.

== Career ==
=== 2011–2014: Benim İçin Üzülme, Bugünün Saraylısı and cinema movies ===
Arduç first got supporting roles in 2011 in the series Küçük Hanımefendi based on novel for fourth time, daily series Dinle Sevgili, and youth comedy Pis Yedili. Later in 2012, he portrayed the character of Ahmet Avcıoğlu in ATV's series Benim İçin Üzülme which was written and directed by Mahsun Kırmızıgül and shot in Hopa, Artvin. Arduç's character, a young person who is a sports enthusiast and wants to play soccer in Trabzonspor, only appeared on the first episode and then in the flashbacks in the remaining episodes, but the character was so liked that after his death in the series a 10-meter banner was put on Trabzonspor's tribunes in his memory.

In 2013, he joined the cast of Bugünün Saraylısı from its 5th episode, a series based on the classic novel of Refik Halid Karay for second time and directed by Kudret Sabancı. For two seasons, he portrayed the character of businessman Selim Bayraktar, who manages the assets and companies of a young girl named Ayşen Kaya, the sole survivor of a group of companies and played by Küçük Hanımefendi's co-star Cansu Tosun. The first season of Bugünün Saraylısı finished with 31 episodes, and its second season ended after 5 episodes due to low ratings. Barış Arduç had his first cinematic debut in Hakan Yonat's 2014 movie Sadece Sen in which he played the character Emin on the last scene.

In November 2014, the movie Deliha was directed by Hakan Algül, and Arduç played the role of Şirinceli Cemil, a handsome photographer.

=== 2015–2018: Racon: Ailem İçin, Kiralık Aşk and Mutluluk Zamani ===
Arduç had his first leading role in January 2015 alongside Mehmet Aslantuğ, Seçkin Özdemir, Hande Doğandemir, and Tomris İncer in ATV's series Racon: Ailem İçin in which he portrayed Tekin Atan, the adopted son and confidant of Mehmet Aslantuğ's character Kenan Korhan. Due to low ratings, the series finished after 4 episodes.

In June 2015, Arduç was cast in a leading role opposite Elçin Sangu in Star TV Romantic Comedy series Kiralık Aşk, which was directed by Metin Balekoğlu, Barış Yöş and Şenol Sönmez and written by Meriç Acemi. Arduç, who portrayed a young and renowned successful shoe designer and business man named Ömer İplikçi, earned a great fan base in the Middle East and won many awards. Kiralık Aşk which started airing in the summer months, quickly became one of the most popular series and achieved tremendous success within social media. The series' teasers on YouTube have millions of views. Arduç met Seçkin Özdemir once again in the second season of the series.

Barış Arduç became the advertising face of Derimod company in 2015. The advertisement clip which showed Arduç with 6 different women in a casino, was directed by Ömer Faruk Sorak, prepared by Alametifarika, and produced by Böcek Productions. Nihat Odabaşı took the photograph for the advertisement campaign which was launched under the slogan "Derimod on my feet". The advertising campaign took its place on television, billboards, internet sites and magazines in October 2015.

In November 2017, Arduç was cast in a leading role opposite Elçin Sangu again in the romantic comedy movie Time of Happiness / Mutluluk Zamanı, which was directed by Şenol Sönmez.

=== 2019–present: Kuzgun, Çukur, Kulüp and Alparslan: Büyük Selçuklu ===
In February 2019, Arduç was cast in a leading role in Star TV drama series Kuzgun as the titular character Kuzgun which is directed by Bahadır İnce. He portrayed the story of a man that returned for revenge after being away for 20 years.

On 12 March 2020, it was confirmed that Arduç had been cast in Show TV's drama series Çukur, starring Aras Bulut İynemli. Joining the series in its 3rd season, Arduç played the role of Arik Boke Erdenet, the younger brother of the main character's enemy.

Barış Arduç portrayed Fıstık İsmail in the Netflix series, Kulüp (The Club) in 2021. In July 2021, Akli Film, the producer of Uyanış: Büyük Selçuklu, announced that Barış Arduç is involved in the second season of Uyanış: Büyük Selçuklu that is based on lives of Seljuk sultans. Arduç portrays the leading role of Alp Arslan in Alparslan: Büyük Selçuklu.

== Philanthropy ==
Known for his commitment to social responsibilityiranno responsibility projects, Barış Arduç has supported numerous charitable initiatives. On 19 September 2015, he participated in a rowing event organized by the Cancer-Free Life Association as part of the "Sports Angels Project" in Istanbul’s Haliç.

In December 2015, he posed for the 2016 Haçiko (Animal Protectionをし Protection and Care Association) calendar alongside other celebrities, with proceeds benefiting stray animal welfare. For the calendar, he posed with a dog under the care of the association and stated, "Owning a pet and treating it like a child are equivalent." The calendar, sold at D&R stores, raised HXNUM with proceeds donated to stray animal welfare.

On 20 December 2015, Arduç performed in a charity concert for the Turkish Education Volunteers Foundation (TEGV) titled "20th Anniversary" at Kanal D, alongside numerous celebrities. During the live broadcast, which raised significant funds, he sang "Nayino" and received widespread acclaim. The event, attended by many prominent figures, supported educational initiatives for children.

On 29 March 2016, Arduç attended the third annual "Shop and Live" event organized by the Cancer-Free Life Association in Istanbul, where he interacted with children suffering from cancer. Proceeds from the event were used to support the treatment and quality of life for children with Lill with cancer. He also designed a "Peace Pillow" for the Şişli Etfal Hospital’s pediatric oncology ward, which was offered for sale to raise funds for the hospital’s renovation.

On 25 May 2016, Arduç, as the association’s goodwill ambassador, attended a charity ball at the Four Seasons Hotel in Istanbul, joined by prominent figures from the arts, business, and media sectors. Proceeds from the event supported the renovation of the Şişli Etfal Hospital’s pediatric oncology ward.

== Filmography ==
Movies
Year	Title	Role	Director	Notes
2014	Sadece Sen	Emin	Hakan Yonat	Supporting role
2014	Deliha	Cemil	Hakan Algül	Leading role
2017	Mutluluk Zamanı	Mert Sönmez	Şenol Sönmez	Leading role
2024	Chasing the Wind	Ege Yazici	Engin Erden	Leading role
2026	Soy	Can		Leading role
Web Series
Year	Title	Role	Director	Notes
2021–2022	Kulüp	Fıstık İsmet	Seren Yüce, Zeynep Günay Tan	Leading role
Television
Year	Title	Role	Director(s)	Notes
2011	Küçük Hanımefendi	Cenk	Özer Kızıltan	
2011	Dinle Sevgili	Hakan	Irmak Çığ, Fulya Yavuzoğlu, Mehtap Köroğlu	
2011	Pis Yedili	Sinan	Süleyman Seçik	Supporting role (season 1, episode 5)
2012–2014	Benim İçin Üzülme	Ahmet Avcıoğlu	Mahsun Kırmızıgül, Serkan Birinci	Supporting role (season 1, episode 5)
2013–2014	Bugünün Saraylısı	Selim Bayraktar	Kudret Sabancı	Supporting role (season 1, episode 5)
2015	Racon: Ailem İçin	Tekin Atan	Mehmet Ada Öztekin	Leading role
2015–2017	Kiralık Aşk	Ömer İplikçi	Metin Balekoğlu, Barış Yöş, Şenol Sönmez	Leading role
2019	Kuzgun	Kuzgun Cebeci	Bahadır İnce	Leading role
2020	Çukur	Arık Böke Erdenet	Sinan Öztürk	Leading role
2021–2023	Alparslan: Büyük Selçuklu	Alp Arslan	Sedat İnci	Leading role
2025	Reminder (Aşkı Hatırla)	Deniz Demirtaş	Özgür Önürme	Leading role
2025	Aşk ve Gözyaşi	Selim Keskin	Engin Erden	Leading role

== Discography ==
Soundtrack
Year	Title	Voiced by	Movie	Notes
2017	Bu Su Hiç Durmaz	Baris Arduc & Elçin Sangu	Mutluluk Zamanı	
