= Always (2011 film) =

- Film poster
- Hangul: 오직 그대만
- Lit.: Only You
- RR: Ojik geudaeman
- MR: Ojik kŭdaeman
- Directed by: Song Il-gon
- Written by: Song Il-gon; Roh Hong-jin
- Story by: Jang Hyun-sung
- Produced by: Kim Jeong-hui; Moon Bo-mi
- Starring: So Ji-sub; Han Hyo-joo
- Cinematography: Hong Kyung-pyo
- Edited by: Nam Na-yeong
- Music by: Choe Cheol-su; Bang Jun-seok
- Production companies: HB Entertainment; 51K
- Distributed by: Showbox/Mediaplex
- Release date: October 20, 2011
- Running time: 106 minutes
- Country: South Korea
- Language: Korean
- Box office: US$6.9 million

Always (Korean: 오직 그대만; lit. 'Only You') is a 2011 South Korean romantic action drama film directed by Song Il-gon and stars So Ji-sub and Han Hyo-joo in the lead roles. The film is about a romance between an ex-boxer, who has closed his heart to the world, and a telemarketer, who remains spirited despite slowly going blind.

It was released in theaters on October 20, 2011. In South Korea, the film had a total of 1,027,614 admissions nationwide. With online tickets selling out a 2,000-seat outdoor movie theater in a record seven seconds, Always was the opening film of the 2011 Busan International Film Festival.

== Cast ==
- So Ji-sub as Jang Cheol-min / Jang Marcelino
- Han Hyo-joo as Ha Jung-hwa
- Yoon Jong-hwa as Min Tae-sik
- Kang Shin-il as Choi (boxing gym manager)
- Park Chul-min as Coach Bang
- Jo Sung-ha as section chief Choi
- Jin Goo as pottery store owner
- Oh Kwang-rok as Park Chang-soo (man wanted by loan sharks)
- Shin Cheol-jin as Elder in rehab
- Kim Jeong-hak as team leader Ma
- Kim Mi-kyung as Sister Joanna
- Wie Seung-bae as martial arts champion
- Jung Jae-jin as shift old man
- Min Kyeong-jin as janitor
- Yeom Hye-ran as beauty parlor owner
- Ahn Se-ho as broker
- Choi Gyo-sik as real estate agent

== Remake ==
The film was officially remade in 2014 in Turkish as Sadece Sen. It has also been remade in Kannada in 2015 as Boxer and in Hindi in 2016 as Do Lafzon Ki Kahani. A Japanese remake, titled Your Eyes Tell, starring Ryusei Yokohama and Yuriko Yoshitaka, was released on October 23, 2020. A Filipino remake, titled Always, starring Kim Chiu and Xian Lim was released on September 28, 2022.

Year	Film	Country	Director
2014	Sadece Sen	Turkey	Hakan Yonat
2015	Boxer	India (Kannada)	Preetham Gubbi
2016	Do Lafzon Ki Kahani'	India (Hindi)	Deepak Tijori
2020	Your Eyes Tell	Japan	Takahiro Miki
2022	Always	Philippines	Dan Villegas

== See also ==
- List of films about boxing
- Thullatha Manamum Thullum, 1999 Indian film with a similar premise
