= Kilomètre Zéro =

- American version DVD cover
- Directed by: Hiner Saleem; Robert Alazraki
- Written by: Hiner Saleem
- Produced by: Hiner Saleem; Fabrice Guez; Kamal Hamarash; Production Companies; Hiner Saleem Production; La Cinefactre; Memento Films Production
- Starring: Nazmi Kirik; Eyam Ekrem; Belcim Bilgin; Ehmed Qeladizehi; Nezar Selami
- Edited by: Anna Ruiz
- Music by: Nikos Kipourgos; Freddy Loth
- Distributed by: Memento Films Distribution
- Release dates: 14 September 2005 (France); 15 November 2007 (U.S.)
- Running time: 91 minutes
- Countries: France; Iraq
- Languages: Kurdish; Arabic; French
- Budget: $2,300,000 US

Kilomètre Zéro (Sorani Kurdish: کیلۆمەتری سفر; French for "Kilometer Zero") is a 2005 film written, produced and co-directed by Kurdish director Hiner Saleem. Kilomètre Zéro is the first Iraqi film chosen for the official Cannes competition.

== Plot ==
The story begins with a road trip story set in Iraqi Kurdistan during the Iran–Iraq War in 1988. The radio announcer is describing the events happening.

The scene then switches to a Kurdish village a few weeks before the Halabja poison gas attack where Ako, a young Kurdish man, is forced to join the Iraqi Army, while he is dreaming of escaping the country. A few dramatic scenes follow, some of them being flashbacks of home. Ako is sent to the frontline with a few Kurdish comrades and is subject to abuse by the other Iraqi soldiers, due to his Kurdish background.

There are other scenes depicting abuse also. In one, a man is beaten for refusing to run laps with the others. In another, a firing squad is seen in executing captured Kurdish guerillas.

When Ako is given a mission to escort the coffin of a dead Iraqi soldier to his family, an unexpected opportunity for escaping comes up. His driver turns out to be an Arab with strong feeling against the Kurds. They are given a small car with the coffin draped in an Iraqi flag, strapped to the top. The two set out for the long journey across the Iraqi landscape, and encounter a few happenings along the way. In one, they are confronted by a screaming Iraqi woman who is convinced that the dead soldier is her husband. In another, the two men are sitting together as they take a break, and the driver refuses to let Ako look at a picture of his wife.

As the journey goes on, Ako does his best to trick the driver into heading toward Kurdistan. He eventually finds his village, now destroyed and abandoned. However, he finds his wife, but their reunion is cut short by an Iraqi bombardment.

The setting switches to Ako and his wife in 2003. They discuss how much they lost during the war, and hear the news that Baghdad has fallen to Coalition troops. They are overjoyed, and celebrate their newfound freedom.

== Cast ==
- Nazmi Kirik
- Eyam Ekrem
- Belçim Bilgin
- Ehmed Qeladizeni
- Nezar Selami
