= Belçim Bilgin =

Turkish actress

- Born: 31 January 1983 (age 43); Ankara, Turkey
- Occupation: Actress
- Spouse: Yılmaz Erdoğan (m. 2006; div. 2018)
- Children: 1

Belçim Bilgin (born 31 January 1983) is a Turkish actress of Kurdish origin.

== Life ==
She was born in Ankara, Turkey on 31 January 1983. She is the great grand niece of Sheikh Said who is known for the Sheikh Said Rebellion. According to her statement, Sheikh Said is the elder brother of her father's grandfather. Her cousin is actress Rojda Demirer. She studied at Mehmet Emin Resulzade Anatolian High School and graduated in 1999. In 2002, she started to study at the Information and Document Management Department of Hacettepe University in Ankara, Turkey. While studying at the university, Bilgin, who wanted to be a theater actor since high school years, met famous actor Yılmaz Erdoğan through a friend. She married Yılmaz Erdoğan in August 2006. She gave birth to a baby boy in 2010. The couple moved to the United States in 2014, where they settled in Beverly Hills. The couple divorced in 2018.

== Career ==
She joined in hit period series Hatırla Sevgili. She had leading role in series Keşanlı Ali Destanı based from classic play. With İbrahim Çelikkol, she played in series Kördüğüm and film Sadece Sen. She played the leading role in Iraqi Kurdish director Hiner Saleem's film Kilomètre Zéro and attended the Cannes Film Festival. In 2011 she played in the movie Kurtuluş Son Durak, Aşk Tesadüfleri Sever. In 2013 she played in the movie Kelebeğin Rüyası directed by Yılmaz Erdoğan. Belçim Bilgin works with the Uçan Süpürge, a women's communication and research association, to prevent child marriage.

== Filmography ==
- Babamın Kemanı (2022)
- Buluşma Noktası (2021)
- Hekimoğlu (2020) – Selin Kurt
- Uzak Ara Eğlence (2020) – Herself (judge)
- Room 5 (2020) (short film) – Filiz
- Acı Kiraz (2020) – Dr. Panova
- Rüzgar (2019) – Ece
- Backstabbing for Beginners (2018) – Nashim
- Cebimdeki Yabancı (2018)
- Çember (2017)
- Annemin Yarası (2016) – Nerma
- Limanlardan Çağrı (2016) Yvette Kedabdar
- Kördüğüm (2016) – Naz
- Çalsın Sazlar (2014)
- Sadece Sen (2014) – Hazal
- Kelebeğin Rüyası (2013) – Suzan Özsoy
- Sessiz (2012)
- Fasle Kargadan (2012)
- Gergedan Mevsimi (2012)
- Kurtuluş Son Durak (2011) – Eylem
- Keşanlı Ali Destanı (2011) – Zilha
- Aşk Tesadüfleri Sever (2011) – Deniz Usman
- Güldünya (2009)
- Yol Arkadaşım (2008–2009) – Figen
- Güz Sancısı (2008) – Nemika
- Dol (2007) – Taman
- Hatırla Sevgili (2006) – Defne Gürsoy
- Sıfır Kilometre (2005) – Selma
