= My Father's Violin =

- Turkish: Babamın Kemanı
- Directed by: Andaç Haznedaroğlu
- Starring: Gülizar Nisa Uray; Engin Altan Düzyatan; Belçim Bilgin
- Distributed by: Netflix
- Release date: 21 January 2022
- Country: Türkiye
- Language: Turkish

My Father's Violin (Turkish: Babamın Kemanı) is a 2022 Turkish film directed by Andaç Haznedaroğlu and starring Gülizar Nisa Uray, Engin Altan Düzyatan and Belçim Bilgin. The film was released on January 21, 2022, on Netflix.

== Cast ==
- Engin Altan Düzyatan as Mahir Mehmet
- Belçim Bilgin as Suna
- Gülizar Nisa Uray as Özlem
- Selim Erdoğan as Ali Riza
- Ayfer Dönmez
- Yiğit Çakir
- Yener Sezgin
- Erdem Baş
