= Hazal Adıyaman =

Turkish actress (born 1989)

- Born: 6 August 1989 (age 36); Adapazarı, Turkey
- Occupation: Actress
- Years active: 2013–present
- Height: 172 cm (5 ft 8 in)

Hazal Adıyaman (born 6 August 1989) is a Turkish actress best known for her roles as 'Gül' in Muhteşem Yüzyıl, 'Derin Çelik' in Bizim Hikaye, and 'Princess Adelfa' in Kuruluş: Osman.

== Life and career ==
Adıyaman has a bachelor's degree in physics from Marmara University. She started her career as an actress in 2013 when she played a recurring role as Gül on the series Muhteşem Yüzyıl. She then played the role of Melek on an episode of the series Aşkın Bedeli in the same year. Adıyaman gained attention when she starred in the drama series Bizim Hikaye by playing the role of Derin Çelik, the younger sister of Deniz Çelik (portrayed by Melisa Döngel). In 2020, she appeared as Princess Adelfa in Kuruluş: Osman. Adıyaman is also known in the Turkish media for her natural beauty.

== Filmography ==
=== Television series ===
| Year | Title | Role | Channel | Notes | Episodes |
|---|---|---|---|---|---|
| 2013 | Bir Yusuf Masali | Yasemin | | | |
| 2013 | Cost of Love | Melek | | | |
| 2013 | The Magnificent Century | Gül | | | |
| 2014 | Cherry Season | Arzu | | | |
| 2014 | Gönül Isleri | | | | |
| 2016 | Hanim Koylu | Gulgun | | | |
| 2016 2018 | Deniz Inside My Heart | Ece Öztuna | | | |
| 2018 2019 | Bizim Hikaye | Derin | | | |
| 2020 | Kurulus: Osman | Adelfa | | | |
| 2021 | Uzak Sehrin Masali | | | | |
| 2022 | Yalniz Kurt | Kübra | | | |

=== Film ===
| Year | Title | Role | Notes |
|---|---|---|---|
| 2013 | Muhteşem Yüzyıl | Gül | |
| 2013 | Aşkın Bedeli | Melek | |
| 2014 | Bir Yusuf Masali | Yasemin | |
| 2014–2015 | Kiraz Mevsimi | - | Guest appearance |
| 2016 | Hanım Köylü | Gülgün | |
| 2017 | Kalbimdeki Deniz | Ece | |
| 2018–2019 | Bizim Hikaye | Derin Çelik | Main character |
| 2020 | Kuruluş: Osman | Princess Adelfa | Guest appearance |
