= Chasing the Wind (film) =

2025 film by Engin Erden

- Turkish: Rüzgara Bırak
- Directed by: Engin Erden
- Screenplay by: Ceylan Naz Baycan
- Produced by: Yağmur Ayar; Cahit Ceylan; Cengiz Çağatay
- Starring: Hande Erçel; Barış Arduç
- Cinematography: Muratcan Gökçe
- Edited by: Deniz Kayık
- Music by: Oğuz Kaplangı; Serkan Celikoz
- Production company: Lanistar Media
- Distributed by: Netflix
- Release date: February 14, 2025
- Running time: 96 minutes
- Country: Turkey
- Language: Turkish
- Box office: est. $3,168,272–3,434,882

Chasing the Wind (Turkish: Rüzgara Bırak) is a 2025 Turkish romance film directed by Engin Erden and written by Ceylan Naz Baycan. Produced by Lanistar Media, and stars Hande Erçel and Barış Arduç.

Principal photography commenced in June 2024 at Istanbul and took 25 working days to complete. The film premiered worldwide on February 14, 2025 on Netflix.

== Cast ==
- Hande Erçel as Asli Mansoy
- Barış Arduç as Ege Yazici
- Barış Aytaç as Yaman
- Gözde Mutluer as Yasemin
- Deniz Balkanli as Gamze
- Olimpia Ahenk as Sirma
- Serhat Nalbantoglu as Nazmi
- Ahmet Saraçoglu as Arif Mansoy
- Tugrul Tulek as Cenk
- Kevork Türker as Korkmaz
- Sebnem Sönmez as Ferzan

== Production ==
=== Development ===
The film was developed under the working title Another Love (Turkish: Bir Başka Aşk) and produced by Lanistar Media. In June 2024, the title of the film was changed to Rüzgara Bırak.

=== Casting ===
In 2024, Barış Arduç and Hande Erçel were reportedly cast to appear marking their first collaboration.

=== Filming ===
Pre-production began in May 2024. The script reading was held on June 14, 2024. Principal photography of the film commenced in June 2024, and filming ended in July 2024. The filming took place in Istanbul and İzmir.

== Music ==
Chasing the Wind

Soundtrack album by Oğuz Kaplangı and Serkan Celikoz
- Released: February 14, 2025
- Genre: Soundtrack
- Length: 43:01
- Language: Turkish
- Label: Elec-Trip Records

The soundtrack for Chasing the Wind is composed by Oğuz Kaplangı and Serkan Celikoz.

Tracklisting
No.	Title	Length
1.	"Reflections"	00:39
2.	"Club"	01:00
3.	"Company"	00:34
4.	"Çeşme"	01:25
5.	"Shots"	02:07
6.	"Surf School (Part 1)"	01:39
7.	"Surf School (Part 2)"	00:41
8.	"Company Bay"	00:54
9.	"Crabby Morning"	00:50
10.	"Pots and Peril"	01:08
11.	"The Palette"	00:40
12.	"Surfing the Calm"	00:26
13.	"Catch the Gremmie"	02:48
14.	"Party on the Rocks"	04:21
15.	"Sneaking in"	00:51
16.	"Corporate Grounds"	01:18
17.	"Tangled in the Bed"	01:43
18.	"Too Shy to Try"	02:58
19.	"Surfing the Tide"	00:39
20.	"The Gift"	01:30
21.	"Leave It to the Wind"	02:45
22.	"Waking to Love"	01:48
23.	"The Gallery"	01:20
24.	"Secret Files"	02:10
25.	"Torn Apart"	02:21
26.	"Confrontations"	04:13
Total length:		43:01

== Release ==
The film was made available to stream exclusively on Netflix on February 14, 2025.

== Reception ==
Ygor Monroe from Caderno Pop awarded the film 3/5 stars. Abhi Singhal of The Pioneer rated the film three stars out of five.
