= Hazal Kaya =

Turkish actress (born 1990)

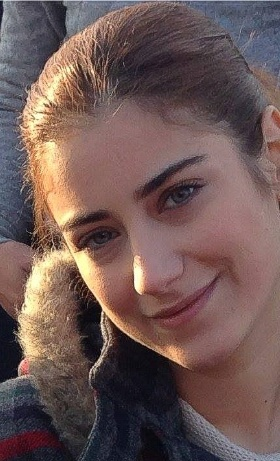
- Kaya in 2020
- Born: Leyla Hazal Kaya; 1 October 1990 (age 36); Konya, Turkey
- Education: Istanbul Bilgi University
- Occupation: Actress
- Years active: 2006–present
- Spouse: Ali Atay (m. 2019)
- Children: 2
- Website: hazalkaya.com.tr

Leyla Hazal Kaya (born 1 October 1990) is a Turkish actress best known for her leading roles in Aşk-ı Memnu (2008–2010), Adını Feriha Koydum (2011–2012) and Bizim Hikaye (2017–2019).

Kaya is one of Turkey's highest-paid actresses. She received several accolades and was the only Turkish recipient of the "Lebanon Awards 2015" award. She made her acting debut with a guest role in Acemi Cadı. Kaya gain popularity for Nihal Ziyagil in a modern-day adaptation of the novel Aşk-ı Memnu, written by Halit Ziya Uşaklıgil.

She is best known for playing the role of Feriha Sarrafoglu, Adını Feriha Koydum (2011–2012) and won 2nd Crystal Mouse Media Awards for Best Actress. The series had one of the highest TV ratings in Turkey. She further known for playing Filiz Elibol in Bizim Hikaye (inspired by the British TV show Shameless) (2017–2019) for which she received highly acclaimed and Latina Turkish Awards for Best Actress respectively.

Kaya also plays the lead character Esra / Peride in the time travel historical drama series Midnight at the Pera Palace (2022). The show was premiered on Netflix. She married actor Ali Atay in 2019; they have two children together.

== Early life ==
Kaya was born in Konya, Turkey. She attended Gaziosmanpaşa elementary school and graduated in 2009 from the Liceo Italiano di Istanbul. She enrolled in Istanbul Bilgi University for her higher education. Her parents, who are both lawyers, divorced when she was 7 years old. She was introduced to the art and acting world at a very young age, and as a child she took ballet and violin lessons for 7 years. Kaya speaks Italian and English fluently, in addition to her native language Turkish. She was also said to be learning a fourth language, German.

== Career ==
=== Early work (2006–2011) ===
Kaya started her acting career in 2006 with TV series Genco. She played the character of Özge (Gülay Erkaya). She had guest roles in fantasy series Acemi Cadı of Turkish version "Sabrina Teenage Witch", popular series Sıla, "Taşların Sırrı". In 2008, Kaya played Nihal Ziyagil in a modern-day adaptation of the novel Aşk-ı Memnu, written by Halit Ziya Uşaklıgil. co-starring Kıvanç Tatlıtuğ and Beren Saat. She had her cinematic debut in Selçuk Aydemir's movie Çalgı Çengi in 2011.

At the same time she took lessons from Ayla Algan in drama. She then joined Ümit Çırak Modern Acting Techniques Workshop and took acting lessons from Ümit Çırak himself.

=== Career progression (2012–2016) ===
Kaya's turning point came when she starred in the first two seasons of the TV series Adını Feriha Koydum (2011) as the lead character, Feriha Yilmaz. She played the role of a porter's daughter trapped between two lives and falls in love with the most popular student at her university, a rich and handsome boy "Emir Sarrafoğlu" (Çağatay Ulusoy). The series had one of the highest TV ratings in Turkey and was highly acclaimed. Later, together with her mother Ayşegül Kaya, she appeared in the commercials for Bingo. In the late 2012, she left the cast of Adını Feriha Koydum and starred in a new series called Son Yaz Balkanlar 1912, portraying the character Emine. However, the series ended after a few episodes due to low ratings.

She later appeared in the 2013 series A.Ş.K and played the character of Azra Özak, a tennis coach. That series also ended after 13 episodes. In 2015 she appeared in Maral: En Güzel Hikayem, opposite Aras Bulut İynemli. She played the leading character Maral Erdem.

=== Established actress (2017–present) ===
After a break of one year, she starred in TV show Bizim Hikaye (in English: Our Story), which is the Turkish adaptation of the American TV series Shameless. In this TV show Kaya plays "Filiz Elibol Aktan", (a young girl forced to take care of her five younger siblings after her mother left the lower-class family) opposite actor Burak Deniz. Writing for Vatan, "She reacted positively to Hazal Kaya's acting, stating while watching Filiz on the screen". The series received positive response and Kaya's performance was highly acclaimed and teamed as "remarkable" and received several accolades including 19th Internet Media Best of the Year Awards for Best Actress and Latina Turkish Awards for Best Series Pair (Burak Deniz). The series was aired in variety of languages.

As of 2021, she shares the leading roles with Bugra Gulsoy and Ozan Dolunay in the TV series Misafir, an adaptation of the Japanese TV series Oasis. Since 2010, she appears as Behzat's dead daughter "Berna" in some episodes and film of hit crime series Behzat Ç.

== Personal life ==
She married actor Ali Atay on 6 February 2019, and gave birth to their son later that year. Their daughter was born in February 2023. In April 2023, prosecutors demanded that Kaya be imprisoned for two years and four months for a tweet in which she allegedly had insulted a Turkish sergeant who was sentenced to ten years imprisonment for having raped Ipek Er.

== In the media ==
Kaya is one of Turkey's highest-paid actresses. Ichaps, having chosen the most important names of 2014 in many categories, included Hazal Kaya among the "most influential names in the world" and granted her the medal of international excellence in the category of artists. According to the results of a survey conducted on the United Arab Emirates-based MBC channels, which ranked Turkish series and special programs, she ranked 4th on the list of most admired Turkish women artists. At the same time, official surveys covering the August 2010–August 2015 period, taken in 35 countries, placed her 6th on the list of 10 most popular actresses. She was also the only Turkish recipient of the "Lebanon Awards 2015" award. According to the results obtained from 35 countries between May 2011 and May 2016, Kaya was the 6th most popular actress. In May 2016, she rose to number five on the list. The website World's Most Beautifuls ranked her fifth on the list of 10 most beautiful women of 2016.

== Filmography ==
=== Films ===
Year	Title	Role	Notes
2011	Çalgı Çengi	Young girl at the warehouse	Special guest appearance
2011	Behzat Ç. Seni Kalbime Gömdüm	Berna Ç.	Special guest appearance
2011	Ay Büyürken Uyuyamam	Hülya	Special guest appearance
2012	Bu Son Olsun	Lale	Special guest appearance
2013	Mavi Dalga	Arzu	Supporting role
2014	İtirazım Var	Zeynep Bulut	Leading role
2015	Kırık Kalpler Bankası	Aslım	Leading role
2022	Benden Ne Olur?	Sertab Bal	Leading role

=== Television ===
Year	Title	Role	Notes
2006–2007	Acemi Cadı	Pelin	Guest appearance
2006	Taşların Sırrı	Bengü	Guest appearance
2006–2008	Sıla	Berrin	Guest appearance
2007–2008	Genco	Özge (Gülay Erkaya)	Supporting role
2008–2010	Aşk-ı Memnu	Nihal Ziyagil	Supporting role
2010	Behzat Ç. Bir Ankara Polisiyesi	Berna Ç.	Guest appearance
2011–2012	Adını Feriha Koydum	Feriha Yılmaz Sarrafoğlu	Leading role
2012	Son Yaz-Balkanlar 1912	Emine	Leading role
2013	A.Ş.K.	Azra Özak	Leading role
2015	Maral: En Güzel Hikayem	Maral Erdem	Leading role
2017–2019	Bizim Hikaye	Filiz Elibol Aktan	Leading role
2020	Menajerimi Ara	Herself	Guest appearance
2021	Misafir	Gece / Güneş	Leading role

=== Web series ===
Year	Title	Role	Notes
2022–	Midnight at the Pera Palace	Esra / Peride	Leading role

== Other work and image ==
=== In advertising ===
Year	Commercials
2006	Tofita
2007	Nescafé
2007	Molped
2007	Turkcell
2008	Eti Burçak
2010	Penti
2012	Bingo
2014	Lux Arabia
2020–2021	İstegelsin
2021	Önlem Bebek Bezi

=== In music videos ===
Year	Music video
2008	Aslı Güngör - "İzmir Bilir Ya"
2011	Selçuk Balcı - "Deniz Üstünde Fener"
2017	Çağatay Akman - "Bizim Hikaye" with Burak Deniz
2018	Cihan Mürtezaoğlu - "Bizim Hikaye" with Burak Deniz

== Awards and nominations ==
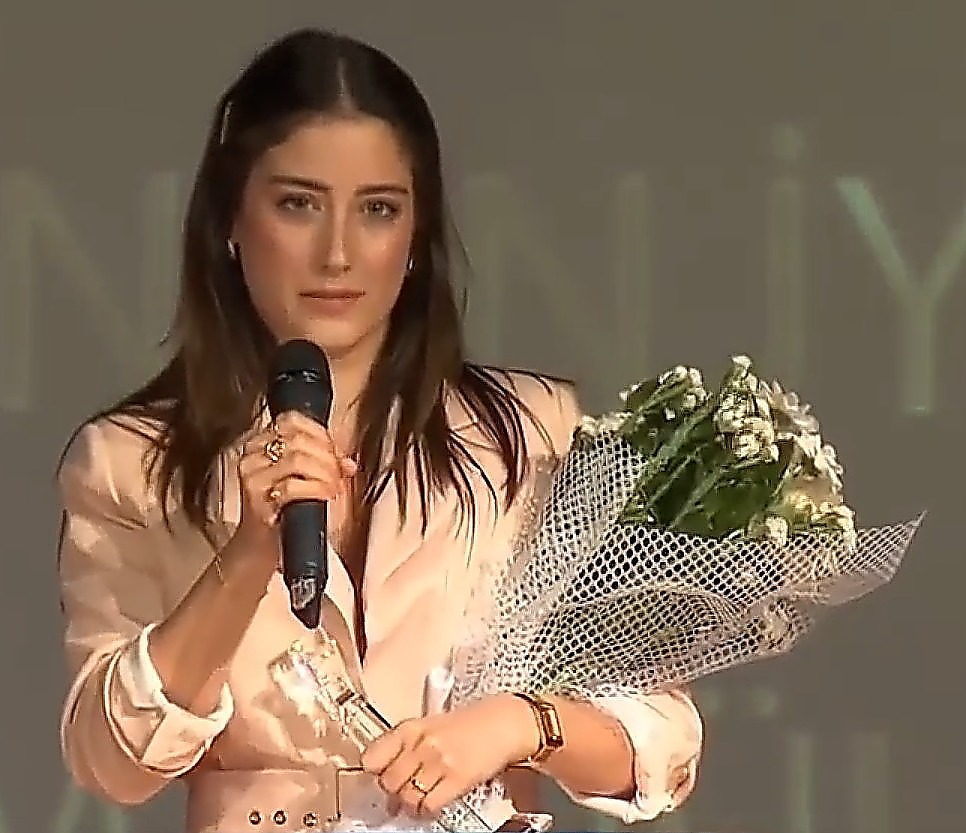
Kaya receiving an award from Istanbul Aydın University in 2019

Awards and nominations
Year	Award	Category	Result
2010	Kavram Olympic Awards	Best Young Actress	Won
2011	Ayaklıgazete.com Awards	The Most Beautiful Actress	Won
2011	Dizifilm.com Oscars	Best Drama Actress	Won
2012	Ayaklıgazete.com Awards	Best Actress in History Series	Nominated
2012	Televizyondizisi.com Awards	Most Popular Actress	Nominated
2012	Sosyalmedya.cc Awards	Best Actress	Won
2012	Eniyiyisec.com Awards	Best Actress	Won
2012	Bakmoda.com Awards	Best Actress	Won
2013	Sayidaty Arab Journal	Best Turkish Female Star	Won
2013	2nd Crystal Mouse Media Awards	Best Actress	Nominated
2013	MagaziMedya.com	Turkey's Most Beautiful Screen Face	Nominated
2013	Gazete5.com	Best Actress	Nominated
2013	Sizcene.com Awards	The Most Beautiful TV Actress in Turkey	Won
2013	Magazincity.com Awards	Best Actress on TV	Won
2013	Politics Magazine Awards	TV Actress of the Year	Nominated
2013	YılınFenomeni.com	Phenomenon Actress of the Year	Nominated
2013	OMÜ 3rd Media Awards	Best Actress	Nominated
2014	Ayaklıgazete.com Awards	Best Drama Actress	Nominated
2014	2nd Düzce University Media Awards	Best Actress	Nominated
2014	5th KTÜ Media Awards	The Most Admired Actress	Nominated
2014	Bilgisefi.com	The Most Beautiful Actress in Turkey	Nominated
2014	Felsebiyat Journal Cinema Nominees	The Actress of the Year	Nominated
2014	The Medal of Excellence for the Most Influential Figures in the World Awards	Medal of Excellence	Won
2014	Top 33 of The Most Beautiful Women on TV Awards	The Breathtaking Women	Won
2015	Lebanon Awards	Best Actress	Won
2015	TelevizyonDizisi.com Awards	Best Actress	Nominated
2015	Marie Claire Turkey	The Most Favorite Actress	Nominated
2015	Eurasia Best Awards	Best Actress	Nominated
2015	4th Crystal Mouse Media Awards	Best Actress	Nominated
2016	7th KTÜ Media Awards	The Most Admired Actress	Nominated
2017	Latina Turkish Awards	Best Kissing Scene (Hazal Kaya - Çağatay Ulusoy)	Won
2017	Turkey Youth Awards	Best TV Actress	Nominated
2017	Stars of the Year Awards	Most Popular Female TV Series	Nominated
2018	IU Student Council 1453 Awards	Best Actress of the Year	Nominated
2019	Latina Turkish Awards	Best Actress	Won
2019	Latina Turkish Awards	Best Series Pair (with Burak Deniz)	Won
2019	Latina Turkish Awards	Best Kiss (with Burak Deniz)	Won
2019	19th Internet Media Best of the Year Awards	Best Actress	Won
2019	Istanbul Aydın University Communication Awards	Best Actress	Won
2019	Golden Butterfly Awards	Best Couple (with Burak Deniz)	Nominated
2021	Istanbul University 7th Golden 61 Awards	Best Advertising Face of the Year	Nominated
