= Av – The Hunt =

Av: The Hunt
- Directed by: Emre Akay
- Written by: Emre Akay; Deniz Cuylan
- Produced by: Emre Akay; Diloy Gülün; Natasha Markou; Tolga Topçu
- Starring: Billur Melis Koç; Ahmet Rıfat Şungar; Yağız Can Konyalı; Adam Bay; Kenan Acar; Baki Rıdvan Kaymaz; Emre Yetim; Ayşe Özköylü
- Music by: Brian Bender; Deniz Cuylan
- Release date: July 2020 (Neuchâtel International Fantastic Film Festival)
- Running time: 86 minutes
- Country: Turkey
- Language: Turkish

Av: The Hunt is a 2020 thriller film that was directed by Emre Akay.

== Plot ==
Ayşe is a married woman who has been conducting an affair behind her husband's back. When this infidelity is discovered, the men in her family react violently. Her lover ends up dead in the process and Ayşe must find a way to flee to Istanbul, where she will be safe. She is given no help from her family, as they have disowned her, and even the people around her seem ambivalent at best to her obvious plight.

== Cast ==
- Billur Melis Koç as Ayşe
- Ahmet Rıfat Şungar as Sedat
- Yağız Can Konyalı
- Adam Bay as Ahmet
- Kenan Acar
- Baki Rıdvan Kaymaz
- Emre Yetim
- Ayşe Özköylü

== Development ==
During the creation process, the director, Akay, received an award for Av: The Hunt from the Antalya Film Forum.

== Release ==
Av: The Hunt had its world premiere in Switzerland at the Neuchâtel International Fantastic Film Festival in July 2020, after which it screened at several other film festivals throughout the world such as FrightFest.

== Reception ==
Av: The Hunt holds a rating of 100% on Rotten Tomatoes, based on nine reviews. Multiple reviews praised the acting of Billur Melis Koç, with Screen Anarchy noting that she "does the vast majority of the heavy lifting" and comparing her favorably to Matilda Lutz in Revenge. Kim Newman also praised the acting and wrote that "It’s relentless and exciting, but also grim – with a sense of the monotonousness of entrenched male evil that’s hard to argue with but dramatically a little flat."

=== Awards ===
- Best Film Award at Birmingham Cine-Excess (2020, won)
