= Sadece Sen =

- Film poster
- Directed by: Hakan Yonat
- Written by: Aslı Zengin, Ceren Aslan
- Produced by: Mahsun Kırmızıgül, Murat Tokat
- Starring: Belçim Bilgin; İbrahim Çelikkol
- Release date: 14 March 2014
- Running time: 105 minutes
- Country: Turkey
- Language: Turkish

Sadece Sen (English title: Only You) is a 2014 Turkish drama film directed by Hakan Yonat. This film is a remake of the 2011, South Korean film, Always. The film was also made in Hindi, Do lafzon ki kahani

== Cast ==
Actors\Actress	Roles
Belçim Bilgin	Hazal
Ibrahim Celikkol	Ali
Kerem Can	Koray
Necmi Yapici	Zeki
Levent Sülün	Kenan
Baris Arduç	Emin
Erol Gedik	Custormer (Müsteri)
Cezmi Baskin	Turan
Erol Demiröz	Ziya
Seher Devrim Yakut	Hülya (as Devrim Yakut)
