= Merve Çağıran =

Turkish actress (born 1992)

- Born: 13 July 1992 (age 32); Balıkesir, Turkey
- Occupation: Actress
- Years active: 2010–present

Merve Çağıran (born 13 July 1992) is a Turkish actress.

Çağıran finished high school in İzmir. She was then educated at 35,5 Art Center. In 2010, she made her television debut with a role in Tek Türkiye. After appearing in various TV series, her main breakthrough occurred in 2016 with Aşk Laftan Anlamaz In 2018, she was honored at the Golden Butterfly Awards with the Shining Star award.

== Filmography ==
Television
| Year | Title | Role |
|---|---|---|
| 2010 | Tek Türkiye | Sevda |
| 2012 | Farklı Desenler | Vicdan |
| 2013 | Ekip 1 - Nizama Adanmış Ruhlar | Aleyna |
| 2013–2014 | Şefkat Tepe | Dicle |
| 2013–2014 | Ötesiz İnsanlar | Hazal |
| 2014 | Hıyanet Sarmalı | Beyza |
| 2014 | Kaçak Gelinler | Güneş |
| 2014–2015 | Küçük Gelin | Havin |
| 2015 | Tatlı Küçük Yalancılar | Janset |
| 2016–2017 | Aşk Laftan Anlamaz | İpek |
| 2017 | Kalp Atışı | Dr. İpek Erdem |
| 2018–2019 | Çarpışma | Meral |
| 2019–2020 | Çocuk | Akça Yılmaz |
| 2021–2022 | Kalp Yarası | Hande Varoğlu |
Film
| Year | Title | Role |
| 2016 | İkimizin Yerine | Sevil |
Web
| Year | Title | Role |
| 2017 | Fi | Ceren |
