= Aşk Laftan Anlamaz =

Turkish romantic comedy television series

- Genre: Romance
- Directed by: Burak Sağyaşar (episodes 1–7); Müge Uğurlar (episodes 8–31)
- Starring: Burak Deniz; Hande Erçel; Oğuzhan Karbi; Özcan Tekdemir; Merve Çağıran; Süleyman Felek; Demet Gül
- Country of origin: Turkey
- Original language: Turkish
- No. of seasons: 1
- No. of episodes: 31

Production
- Producer: Bi Yapım
- Running time: Around 120-150 minutes per episode

Original release
- Network: Show TV
- Release: 15 June 2016 – 19 February 2017

Love Doesn't Understand Words (Aşk Laftan Anlamaz) is a Turkish romantic comedy television series broadcast on Show TV. The series premiered on June 15, 2016. It stars Burak Deniz as Murat Sarsılmaz and Hande Erçel as Hayat Uzun. The story is set in Istanbul and follows a workplace romance at a multinational fashion company, Sarte. The series has aired in over 30 countries worldwide and has reached millions of views on YouTube.

== Plot ==
Hayat Uzun, a native of Giresun village and daughter of a fisherman is under pressure to secure employment in Istanbul or she will have to return to her family in the countryside and would be forced into an arranged marriage by her strict conservative father. She currently lives with her best friends Ipek and Asli, with her mother, Emine, visiting them. A case of mistaken identity gets her a job at multinational textile company Sarte, as personal assistant to the assistant of Murat Sarsılmaz, Sarte's head. Originally, the job was reserved for Suna Pektas a family friend of Sarsilmaz's.

Murat is drawn towards Hayat. This provokes jealousy from Murat's ex-girlfriend, Didem, the lead model for the company. Didem causes misunderstandings that make Murat push Hayat away, but he then pursues her and apologizes, eventually firing Didem for her plotting. Murat's personal chauffeur and best friend, Kerem falls for Ipek, and she later returns his advances. Murat brings Hayat to his home to recover from a panic attack caused by Didem, and they bond over the weekend, but Didem then arrives claiming to be pregnant. Murat is distraught but accepts his responsibility to marry Didem for the baby's sake. Both the families meet and decide their wedding. Murat clarifies to them that the marriage is just a formality to legitimize the child and he won't live with Didem. Hayat learns from Asli, a nurse, that Didem faked her pregnancy tests. Murat's stepmother Derya, also learns the truth and helps Didem to fake a miscarriage before her truth is discovered, which releases Murat from his responsibility. Murat's brother, Doruk meets Asli, and they become friends which later turns into love.

Meanwhile, Hayat's landlord Fadik's nephew Ibrahim enters the plot. Hayat with the help of her friends Ipek and Asli decides to make Murat suffer a bit because he continues to maintain distance from her. She pretends to be in a romantic relationship with Ibrahim which sparks Murat's jealousy. Later on due to a series of events Murat learns the truth.

On Hayat's (actually Suna's) birthday, Murat welcomes Hayat in his life in the same place where he presumably lost his mother, Leyla Sarsılmaz. Both begin a very happy relationship. But Hayat is in constant despair due to her false identity.

Meanwhile, Didem brainwashes Ibrahim into believing that Murat is cheating on Hayat. Murat proposes marriage to Hayat but is still unaware of her true identity. Hayat feels sad but is unable to disclose this to him fearing she might lose him. Kerem learns Hayat's truth and breaks up with Ipek because she knew all along about Hayat/Suna. Murat's grandmother stops Kerem from telling the truth to Murat to save his happiness. Ibrahim confesses his feelings to Hayat and tells her about Murat's infidelity which causes misunderstandings between them. Murat takes her to Didem to clarify her doubts and they reconcile.

Murat learns of Didem's fake pregnancy and throws her out of his company for lying. Hayat is frightened of her own lies and decides to tell the truth. However, Derya discloses the truth to Murat before Hayat can and he's heartbroken. Hayat loses her job and her grandfather, Hasmet, who has arrived in Istanbul, decides that she must return home.

Afraid of losing Hayat, Murat goes to stop her and asks for her hand from Mr. Hasmet. Later, when her grandfather does not agree for their union due to their families' past history, he elopes with Hayat. On the day of the wedding Murat discovers a letter written for his grandma from his mother Leyla which reveals that she is alive and had left him for her own career and the truth was kept from him. He confronts his grandma and tells her he'll never forgive them and Hayat. Both get married in front of their friends. However, Murat, unable to forgive Hayat, is cold towards her.

Murat becomes jealous when Emre, a contractor to Sarte, flirts with Hayat and the company suffers. Murat and Hayat fall more in love and friction in their relationship increases at the same time. Derya disapproves of Doruk's relationship with Asli. She is also always worried that Doruk will not get his rightful share in Sarte. However, Doruk does not let her influence him against his brother.

Murat's mom returns with nurse Hazal in a series of events. Hayat realizes that their relationship is not working and decides to get divorced after Murat misbehaves with her. When his mother is hospitalized from an accident, Murat contemplates Hayat's desire to separate and realizes that he has to fight for her. Kerem and Ipek reunite. Murat tries to mend his relationship with Hayat, but she spurns his efforts being very hurt. Emre sends an unusual message to Hayat confessing his love Murat is angry on Hayat and he leaves her saying the marriage is over. But then Murat returns to save Hayat from a fire, saying that he cannot live without her. Emre and Derya together plot to separate Hayat and Murat in order to destroy Murat.

Hayat and Murat get married again in front of her brother according to all rituals and go on their honeymoon. On the first night, Hayat and Murat have a very passionate sex. Nejat sells his shares of Sarte to Emre. Emre interrupts the honeymoon when he reveals to Hayat that Murat is not a Sarsilmaz.

Later Hazal kills Murat's mom in a revengeful act. Murat is angry with Hayat on finding a gift box in their room from Emre which Derya had kept there. He believes Hayat is lying to him again due to her suspicious behavior during the honeymoon as well. Emre, on the other hand black-mails Hayat to tell the truth to Murat or start working with Emre. Hayat is so distraught that she tries to kill herself in Emre's office. This shakes Emre who changes his mind. He decides to return his shares and tells Derya to end all scheming and plotting. Then he calls Hayat for a last meeting to return the shares which ends up in their accident with Murat's car because Derya had goons tamper with Emre's brakes to kill him. Emre has some serious injuries in the accident and goes into a coma. Seeing this Derya gets a chance and explains everything to Murat without proving herself guilty.

Doruk's old college friend, Bilge returns and wants to get back with him. Asli witnesses Bilge kissing Doruk and thinks Doruk cheated on her so she ends things with him. He tries to stop her but she does not stop. In order to get revenge, she flirts with Hayat's brother, Cemil and pretends to be in a relationship with him which causes Doruk to become jealous. This is also hers and Cemil's plan to make Tuval jealous as Cemil is in love with her.

Murat is angry with Hayat that she is hiding something, so Hayat decides to tell the truth to Murat. Murat is devastated on this news but then Hayat does another DNA test which reveals that Murat is the heir of the Sarsılmaz family and Doruk is not. But Murat doesn't tell this to Doruk for peace in their family. Murat gives all his shares to Doruk and convinces the staff at Sarte to accept him as their boss.

Murat plans on starting a new company and Hayat finds out that she is pregnant and the whole family is elated. Doruk's mother, Derya, argues with the house servant and Hayat gets in the middle of it, in hopes to end the brawl, but ends up falling down the stairs whilst pregnant. She later learns that the baby is unharmed. Derya, unaware of the baby's condition, packs her belongings and tries to take Doruk with her as she is worried that she will get the blame for Hayat falling down the stairs. But Doruk stays and Derya leaves. Cemil & Asli's plan succeeds when Tuval starts developing feelings for Cemil. On Valentine's Day, Murat reveals to Hayat his plans about the company and to name it "Hyt" after her while they share the joy of becoming parents and embrace.

Five years later, Hayat and Murat have four-year-old twins and she is expecting again. Kerem and Ipek have a newborn and Doruk and Asli are back together. The series ends happily with Hayat getting into labour for welcoming the newest member of Sarsilmaz family together.

== Cast ==
=== Main ===
- Burak Deniz as Murat Sarsılmaz: Owner of Sarte; Nejat and Leyla's son; Derya's stepson; Doruk's step-brother; Hayat's husband
- Hande Erçel as Hayat Uzun Sarsılmaz: Emine's daughter; Cemil's sister; Aslı and İpek's best friend; Murat's wife

=== Recurring ===
- Oğuzhan Karbi as Doruk Sarsılmaz: Nejat and Derya's son; Murat's half-brother; Asli's husband
- Özcan Tekdemir as Aslı Sarsılmaz: Hayat and İpek's best friend; Doruk's wife
- Merve Çağıran as İpek: Hayat and Aslı's best friend; Kerem's wife
- Süleyman Felek as Kerem: Murat's best friend; İpek's husband
- Bülent Emrah Parlak as Cemil Uzun: Emine's son; Hayat's brother; Tuval's love interest
- Demet Gül as Tuval Yanıkoğlu: Sarte's head designer; Cemil's love interest
- İsmail Ege Şaşmaz as İbrahim: Fadik's nephew who loved Hayat
- Sultan Köroğlu Kiliç as Emine Uzun: Hayat and Cemil's mother
- Evren Duyal as Fadik: Emine's friend; Hayat and Cemil's aunt
- Birand Tunca as Emre Azatoğlu: A contractor to Sarte
- Betül Çobanoğlu as Derya Sarsılmaz: Nejat's wife; Murat's stepmother; Doruk's mother
- Cem Emüler as Nejat Sarsılmaz: Head of Sarte; Azime's son; Derya's husband; Murat's and Doruk's father
- Nazan Diper as Azime Sarsılmaz: Nejat's mother; Murat's grandmother; Haşmet's fiancée
- Metin Akpınar as Haşmet Uzun: Emine's father-in-law, Hayat and Cemil's grandfather; Azime's fiancé
- Nurseli Tırışkan as Leyla Sarsılmaz: Nejat's ex-wife; Murat's mother
- Hazal Eylül Çelik as Hazal Doğan, Leyla's nurse and her ultimate killer
- Elif Doğan as Suna Pektas: Murat's childhood friend who proposed to him
- Metehan Kuru as Gökçe, Suna's boyfriend
- Oğuz Okul as Kamal Pektas: Suna's father
- Gözde Kocaoğlu Yağmur as Çağla: Murat's assistant
- Tuğçe Karabacak as Didem: Murat's ex-girlfriend; Lead model of Sarte.
- Alp Navruz as Cenk: Didem's friend

== International airing ==
Aşk Laftan Anlamaz aired in Philippines as Hayat on ETC from February to June 2021. In Pakistan it aired as Pyaar Lafzon Mein Kahan on LTN Family while in Sri Lanka it aired as Thamath Adare Nathnam on Hiru TV. In Slovenia, it was shown in June 2022 as Ljubezen ne rabi besed on POP TV. In Bangladesh it aired as Hayat Murat: Premer Kono Vasha Nei (হায়াত মুরাত: প্রেমের কোন ভাষা নেই) on Channel I from September 2021 to June 2022.

== See also ==
- Television in Turkey
- List of Turkish television series
- Turkish television drama
