= Melisa Döngel =

Turkish actress and model (born 1999)

- Born: 18 September 1999 (age 25); Istanbul, Turkey
- Citizenship: Turkey; Russia
- Education: Osman Yağmurdereli Art Academy
- Occupations: Actress; model
- Years active: 2014–present
- Height: 176 cm (5 ft 9 in)

Melisa Döngel (born 18 September 1999) is a Turkish actress and model best known for her role as Deniz Çelik in the drama series Bizim Hikaye and as Çağla in the drama series Love, Reason, Get even.

== Life and career ==
Melisa Döngel was born on 18 September 1999, her father is Turkish, and her mother, Natalia Orlova, is Russian, now living in Sevastopol. She completed her education at Osman Yağmurdereli Art Academy. She started her acting career with the Elif series, which premiered in 2014. In 2016, she played the character of Sevtap in the TV series Hangimiz Sevmedik. In the same year, she played the character of Nil in the longest Turkish series Arka Sokaklar.

In 2018, she appeared as Deniz Çelik in the drama series Bizim Hikaye in which she gained acclaim for portraying the character. In the series Sen Çal Kapımı, which started to be broadcast on FOX in 2020, she portrays the character of Ceren Başar. Döngel was forced to withdraw from the series for a few episodes due to a problem in her intestines. She had guest role in series "Sadakatsiz". She played in rom-com "Aşk Mantık İntikam".

In supporting roles, she portrayed iconic females Marilyn Monroe, Emel Sayın, Seda Sayan. She joined sequel historical series Barbaros Hayreddin: Sultanın Fermanı of series Barbaroslar: Akdeniz'in Kılıcı.

With Serkay Tütüncü, she appeared in "Kusursuz Kiracı" and "Kirli Sepeti".

In July 2021, it was revealed that Döngel was involved in a legal battle against her father over the custody of her younger sister. She had been molested by her father as a child and he was later imprisoned.

== Filmography ==
TV series
Year	Title	Role	Note
2016	Arka Sokaklar	Nil	Cameo role
2016	Hangimiz Sevmedik	Sevtap	Cameo role
2017–2018	Elif	Süreyya	Supporting role
2018–2019	Bizim Hikaye	Deniz Çelik	Supporting Role
2019	Aşk Ağlatır	Cemre Balaban	Supporting role
2020–2021	Sen Çal Kapımı	Ceren Başar	Supporting Role
2021	Sadakatsiz	Young Hicran	Cameo Role
2021–2022	Aşk Mantık İntikam	Çağla Yılmaz	Leading role
2022	Kusursuz Kiracı	Leyla	Supporting role
2022–2023	Barbaros Hayreddin: Sultanın Fermanı	Mia de Luna	Leading role
2023–2024	Kirli Sepeti	Aylin	Supporting role
2024	Holding	Sema Altınordu	Supporting role
Web series
Year	Title	Role	Note
2022	Dünyayla Benim Aramda	Ceren	Supporting role
Film
Year	Title	Role	Note
2023	Prestij Meselesi	Ayşen	Leading role
2023	Aşk Taktikleri 2	Feride	Supporting role
TBA	Cem Karaca'nın Gözyaşları	Emel Sayın	Supporting role
