= Now (Turkish TV channel) =

Turkish television channel

- Country: Turkey

Programming
- Language: Turkish
- Picture format: 1080i HDTV (downscaled to 576i for the SD feed)

Ownership
- Owner: The Walt Disney Company
- Parent: The Walt Disney Company EMEA (Disney Entertainment)
- Sister channels: BabyTV; Disney Junior; FX; National Geographic; Nat Geo Wild

History
- Launched: 24 February 2007; 19 years ago
- Replaced: TGRT
- Former names: Fox (2007–2024)

Links
- Website: www.nowtv.com.tr

Availability

Terrestrial
- Analogue: VHF 7 (Istanbul)

Now (stylized in all caps) is a Turkish free-to-air television channel owned by The Walt Disney Company EMEA. Since July 2012, the channel broadcasts in 16:9 (1080i HDTV).

== History ==
The channel was originally TGRT (acronym in Turkish: Türkiye Gazetesi Radyo Televizyonu, lit. 'Turkey Newspaper Radio Television') and began broadcasting on 23 April 1993, under İhlas Holding. Between 2001 and 2004, TGRTwas owned by Tasarruf Mevduatı Sigorta Fonu before being sold again to İhlas Holding.

On 23 July 2006, News Corporation acquired TGRT from İhlas Holding, and was formed by Ahmet Ertegün. The channel was later relaunched as FOX on 24 February 2007.

David Parker Reid was the General Manager of Fox Turkey between 2006 and 2009, succeeded by Pietro Vicari (2009-2014) and Adam Theiler appointed on 26 November 2014.

Third Fox logo from 2019 to 2024

On 12 February 2024, the channel rebranded to Now as a part of Disney's planned phaseout of Fox brand following the acquisition of 21st Century Fox. Unlike other Fox-branded channels internationally, the Turkish channel did not rebrand to Star Channel since Turkey already had an unrelated channel called Star TV and the Turkish version of FX already existing in the market.

== 2025 naming dispute with RTÜK ==
On 31 January 2025, Turkey's broadcasting regulator the Radio and Television Supreme Council (RTÜK), gave the channel 30 days to change its name and logo after an objection from an unrelated broadcaster, Istanbul Now TV over use of the "Now" name. RTÜK board member Tuncay Keser said that if updated logo documentation was not submitted in that window, the channel's broadcasts could be suspended for three months and its licence revoked. The channel appealed against the decision.

== Programs broadcast by Now ==
As of September 2026, NOW's drama lineup includes:

- Yeraltı (2025– ) — crime drama; aired Wednesdays through its first-season finale on 20 May 2026, with a new season expected in September 2026.
- ''Kıskanmak'' (2025– )
- ''Sekizinci Aile'' — a Disney+ original series (first released on that platform in 2025) given its first television broadcast on Now in September 2026.
- ''Ömür Usta''
- ''Sevdam Karadeniz''
- ''Halef: Köklerin Çağrısı''
- ''A.B.İ.''
- ''Doktor: Başka Hayatta''
- ''Cevher'' — a Turkish adaptation of the French series HPI (High Intellectual Potential), announced for Now.

=== Former programing ===
- 2023: Ruhun Duymaz (Love Undercover) (Ended)
- 2023: Yaz Şarkısı (Melody Love) (Ended)
- 2023: Kısmet (The Fate) (Ended)
- 2023: Yabani (Wild) (Tuesday at 20:00)
- 2023: Bambaşka Biri (Someone Else) (Mondays at 20:00)
