= Golden Butterfly Awards =

Turkish music and television awards

- Altın Kelebek Ödülleri
- Awarded for: Excellence in music and television
- Sponsored by: Pantene
- Location: Zorlu PSM, Istanbul
- Country: Turkey
- Presented by: Hürriyet
- Reward: Trophy
- First award: 1972
- Final award: 2024
- Website: pantenealtinkelebekodulleri.com

Television coverage
- Network: Kanal D

The Golden Butterfly Awards (Turkish: Altın Kelebek Ödülleri) are annual Turkish music and television awards held since 1972. Sponsored by Pantene, winners are chosen by readers of the daily newspaper Hürriyet, and the event is broadcast live on the television channel Kanal D. Since 2017, the ceremony has included Azerbaijan's Brightest Star award, to celebrate that country's highest achievements in the music and television industries.

== Categories ==
=== Television ===
- Best Series
- Best Actress
- Best Actor
- Best Comedy Series
- Best Actress in a Comedy
- Best Actor in a Comedy
- Best Director
- Best Screenwriter
- Best Series Music
- Best Child Actor
- Best Competition Program
- Best Talk Show
- Best Sports Program
- Best Magazine Program
- Best Culture and Art Program
- Best Daytime Program
- Best TV Series Couple
- Best Female Host
- Best Male Host
- Best Female News Presenter
- Best Male News Presenter
- Best News Program

=== Music ===
- Best Song of the Year
- Best Turkish Pop Female Artist
- Best Turkish Pop Male Artist
- Best Turkish Rap Female Artist
- Best Turkish Rap Male Artist
- Best Turkish Folk Female Artist
- Best Turkish Folk Male Artist
- Best Turkish Rock Female Artist
- Best Turkish Rock Male Artist
- Best Turkish Classical Female Artist
- Best Turkish Classical Male Artist
- Best Fantezi Music Female Artist
- Best Fantezi Music Male Artist
- Best Breakthrough Artist
- Best Group
- Best Breakthrough Group
- Best Music Video
- Best Rap Group

=== Digital ===
- Best Internet Series
- Best Digital Content
- Best YouTuber
- Best Twitch Streamer
- Best Influencer

=== Special ===
- TV Stars Special
- Azerbaijan's Brightest Star
