= List of Turkish films of 2018 =

A list of Turkish films released in 2018.

== List of films ==
Opening	Title	Director	Cast	Genre	Ref
April 13	Arada	Mu Tunç	Burak Deniz, Büşra Develi, Ceren Moray, Deniz Celiloglu, Selim Bayraktar, Seda Akman	Drama, Teen	
January 5	Arif V 216	Kıvanç Baruönü	Cem Yılmaz, Ozan Güven, Seda Bakan, Zafer Algöz	Sci-Fi, Comedy	
June 1	The Wild Pear Tree	Nuri Bilge Ceylan	Aydın Doğu Demirkol, Murat Cemcir, Bennu Yıldırımlar	Drama	
September 21	The Pigeon	Banu Sıvacı	Evren Erler, Kemal Burak Alper, Ruhi Sari, Demet Genç	Drama	
September 21	Never Leave Me	Aida Begić	İsmail Hakkı Şen, Carol Abboud, Feyyaz Duman, Nisreen Faour	Drama	
September 27	İçerdekiler	Hüseyin Karabay	Caner Cindoruk, Settar Tanriogen, Gizem Soysaldı	Drama	
October 26	Müslüm	Ketche, Can Ulkay	Timuçin Esen, Erkan Kolçak Köstendil, Güven Kiraç, Erkan Can, Zerrin Tekindor, Erkan Avci, Turgut Tunçalp, Taner Ölmez, Ayça Bingöl, Teoman, Şahin Kendirci, Alper Parlak	Drama	
November 23	Deliler	Osman Kaya	Cem Uçan, Erkan Petekkaya, Nur Fettahoglu, Yetkin Dikinciler	History	
December 8	Şampiyon	Ahmet Katıksız	Ekin Koç, Farah Zeynep Abdullah, Fikret Kuşkan	Romance	
August 29	Yuva	Emre Yeksan	Kutay Sandikçi, Eray Cezayirlioğlu, İmren Şengel, Okan Bozkuş	Drama	
August 17	Milyonluk Kuş	Hayal Aslanzade	Dilara Aliyeva, Mehtap Bayri, Mushviq Shahverdiyev, Ufuk Özkan	Comedy	

== See also ==
- 2018 in Turkey
