= Beste Kökdemir =

Turkish actress

- Born: 29 August 1993 (age 32); Sinop, Turkey
- Occupation: Actress
- Years active: 2012–present
- Spouse: Fazlı Erdinç Çatak (m. 2025)

Beste Kökdemir (born 29 August 1993) is a Turkish actress.

== Early life ==
Beste Kökdemir was born on 29 August 1993 in Sinop, Turkey. She completed her primary and secondary education in Sinop. She was later enrolled in Haliç University Fashion Design Department. Kökdemir is known for her love of tattoos. At the age of 12, she had a tattoo written "Bring me Back to Life" on her left arm. In addition she has another tattoo written "One Day" on her right wrist.

== Career ==
She began her acting career in 2012, and it was reported that she was cast in Bir Çocuk Sevdim, however, in the last minute she was replaced by Gülcan Aslan. She made her television debut with Çıplak Gerçek and depicted the character of Hazal with Taner Ölmez. In 2013, she appeared in the hit crime series Behzat Ç. Bir Ankara Polisiyesi. In 2014, she appeared in the youth series Not Defteri and portrayed the character of Selin. In 2015, she joined the cast of the hit series Poyraz Karayel (Season 2). In the same year she appeared in the series Tatlı Küçük Yalancılar adaptation of "Pretty Little Liars" and portrayed the character of Açelya. The show also starred Şükrü Özyıldız, Bensu Soral, Büşra Develi, Melisa Şenolsun and Dilan Çiçek Deniz. Kökdemir has stated that she is very self-assured and her dream is to acquire an Oscar in the future.

In 2016, she made her appearance in the historical fiction series Muhteşem Yüzyıl: Kösem and portrayed the character of Meleksima Hatun. In 2017, she made her cinematic debut in the movie Taş and depicted the character of Suna. In 2018, she made her debut in the series Kalbimin Sultanı and portrayed the role of Hoşyar Kadın, wife of the Ottoman Sultan Mahmud II, an alluring, extremely magnanimous and compassionate woman. She joined in hit series "Hayat Şarkısı". In 2019, she appeared in the series Her Yerde Sen and depicted the character of Eylül.

== Filmography ==
Film
Year	Title	Role	Note
2017	Taş	Suna	
2022	Kim Bu Aile		
Web Series
Year	Title	Role	Note
2017	7 Yüz	İrem	
2021	Alya Vol 1	Elif	
Television
2012	Çıplak Gerçek	Hazal	Leading role
2013	Behzat Ç		Joined
2014	Not Defteri	Selin	Leading role
2015	Tatlı Küçük Yalancılar	Açelya/Akasya	Leading role
2015	Poyraz Karayel		Joined
2015	Hayat Şarkısı	Melisa	Joined
2015–2017	Muhteşem Yüzyıl: Kösem	Meleksima Sultan	Joined
2018	Kalbimin Sultanı	Hoşyar Kadın	Leading role
2019	Her Yerde Sen	Eylül	Joined
