= Tatlı Küçük Yalancılar =

Turkish television series

- Promotional poster
- Genre: Psychological thriller; Drama
- Based on: Pretty Little Liars Sara Shepard (books) and; I. Marlene King (original TV series)
- Written by: Elif Usman
- Directed by: Cem Karci
- Starring: Şükrü Özyıldız; Bensu Soral; Büşra Develi; Melisa Şenolsun; Dilan Çiçek Deniz; Beste Kökdemir; Burak Deniz
- Opening theme: "Secret" by Sertab Erener
- Composer: Aytekin Atas
- Country of origin: Turkey
- Original language: Turkish
- No. of seasons: 1
- No. of episodes: 13

Production
- Producers: Saner Ayar; Onur Güvenatam
- Production companies: O3 Productions Turkey; O3 Medya; O3 Media; Warner Bros. International Television Production

Original release
- Network: Star TV
- Release: July 6 – October 3, 2015

Tatlı Küçük Yalancılar (Sweet Little Liars) is a Turkish psychological thriller drama series produced by O3 Media and aired for the first time on July 6, 2015, on Star TV. Based on the popular American series Pretty Little Liars, it stars Burak Deniz, Şükrü Özyıldız, Bensu Soral, Büşra Develi, Melisa Şenolsun, Dilan Çiçek Deniz, and Beste Kökdemir.

== Plot ==
The plot follows the lives of four friends, Aslı, Selin, Ebru and Hande after the disappearance of Açelya, the fifth friend of the group. A year later they begin to receive anonymous messages from someone calling himself "A". The messages threaten to reveal all their secrets, even some that only Açelya knew. Akasya who Açelya's twin sister killed Açelya. Psychopath Akasya acted like Açelya.

== Cast ==
- Bensu Soral as Aslı (Aria Montgomery)
- Büşra Develi as Selin (Spencer Hastings)
- Beste Kökdemir as Açelya / Akasya (Alison DiLaurentis)
- Dilan Çiçek Deniz as Ebru (Emily Fields)
- Melisa Şenolsun as Hande (Hanna Marin)
- Burak Deniz as Toprak Kaynak (Toby Cavanaugh)
- Olgun Toker as Güven
- Deniz Hamzaoğlu as Necip Tunali
- Mehmet Ozan Dolunay as Barış (Caleb Rivers)
- Merve Çağıran as Janset (Jenna Marshall)
- Esra Ruşan as Melis, Selin's sister (Melissa Hastings)
- Kaan Yılmaz as Ilgaz (Ian Thomas)
- Gökçe Yanardag as Asuman, Hande's mother (Ashley Marin)
- Tülay Günal as Vildan, Selin's mother (Veronica Hastings)
- Kubilay Tunçer as Bahadir, Aslı's father (Byron Montgomery)
- Almıla Uluer Atabeyoğlu as Emel, Aslı's mother (Ella Montgomery)
- Cüneyt Uzunlar as Polat
- Alperen Duymaz as Cesur, Acelya's brother (Jason DiLaurentis)
- Işıl Dayıoğlu as Münevver
- Özge Özacar as Müge (Mona Vanderwaal)
- Deniz Can Aktaş as Seçkin
- Kaan Kasapoğlu as Mert
- Şükrü Özyıldız as Eren (Ezra Fitz)
- Esra Ronabar as Ilgın

== Production ==
=== Casting ===
After the series, Dilan Çiçek Deniz and Burak Deniz played in Yarım Kalan Aşklar and Kal. Burak Deniz and Büşra Develi played in Arada. Burak Deniz and Merve Çağıran played in Aşk Laftan Anlamaz. Burak Deniz and Melisa Şenolsun played in Koton commercials. Dilan Çiçek Deniz and Alperen Duymaz played in Çukur and Bodrum Masalı. Büşra Develi and Alperen Duymaz played in Erkek Severse. Şükrü Özyıldız and Melisa Şenolsun played in Nefes Nefese. Şükrü Özyıldız and Büşra Develi played in Akıncı. Ozan Dolunay and Özge Özacar played in Lise Devriyesi. Ozan Dolunay and Olgun Toker wold go on to play together when the former joined the second season of Kudüs Fatihi Selahaddin Eyyubi.

Burak Deniz and Büşra Develi would start a relationship after meeting in this series; they parted ways in 2018. Melisa Şenolsun and Ozan Dolunay would also be in a relationship after meeting in this series until breaking up in 2019.
