= Bensu Soral =

Turkish actress (born 1991)

- Born: 23 March 1991 (age 34); Bursa, Turkey
- Occupations: Actress, model and commercial
- Years active: 2012–present
- Spouse: Hakan Baş (m. 2018)
- Relatives: Hande Soral (sister)

Bensu Soral Baş (born 23 March 1991) is a Cypriot-Turkish actress.

== Life and career ==
She studied at İnegöl Anatolian High School in Bursa. She is still studying graphic design at the Faculty of Fine Arts of Marmara University. She started acting career by the support of her sister Hande Soral who is an actress. For the first time she appeared on television screen with period series Yol Ayrımı based from novel with Engin Altan Düzyatan.

She played in youth series "Boynu Bükükler" alongside Çağlar Ertuğrul, Öznur Serçeler. In 2015, she acted alongside Şükrü Özyıldız, Dilan Çiçek Deniz, Büşra Develi, Alperen Duymaz, Beste Kökdemir, Burak Deniz and Melisa Şenolsun in the TV series Tatlı Küçük Yalancılar adaptation of 'Pretty Little Liars'. Later in 2016, she played the role of Melek in crime series İçerde opposite to Çağatay Ulusoy.

In 2018 she made her film debut in franchise comedy Organize İşler 2: Sazan Sarmalı alongside Kıvanç Tatlıtuğ, Ezgi Mola and Yılmaz Erdoğan. She is set to play a leading role in the Iranian-Turkish film Mest-i Aşk alongside İbrahim Çelikkol, Selma Ergeç, Shahab Hosseini, Parsa Pirouzfar, Hande Erçel and Boran Kuzum.

== Filmography ==
Television
Year	Title	Role	Note
2012	Yol Ayrımı	Ayşe	Supporting role
2013	Vicdan	Müge	Supporting role
2014	Boynu Bükükler	Miray	Supporting role
2015	Tatlı Küçük Yalancılar	Aslı	Leading role
2016–2017	İçerde	Melek Yılmaz	Leading role
2021	Cam Tavanlar	Leyla	Leading role
2022–2023	Tuzak	Ceren Gümüşay	Leading role

Web
Year	Title	Role	Notes	Platform
2022	Private Lesson	Azra	Leading role	Netflix

Cinema
Year	Title	Role	Notes
2018	Dıșarda 2	Leyla Özdemir	Leading role
2019	Organize İşler 2: Sazan Sarmalı	Nazlı Noyan	Leading role
2024	Intoxicated by Love	Maryam	Supporting role
2024	Bir Cumhuriyet Şarkısı	Miti Kovaçeva	Guest appearance

Music video
Year	Singer	Song
2013	Murat Dalkılıç	Kader

== Awards ==
Year	Organization	Category
2015	42nd Pantene Golden Butterfly Awards	Pantene Shining Star
