= Ece İrtem =

Turkish actress (1991–2026)

- Born: 14 June 1991; Sivas, Turkey
- Died: 15 June 2026 (aged 35); Kadıköy, Turkey
- Education: Yaşar University
- Occupation: Actress

Ece İrtem (14 June 1991 – 15 June 2026) was a Turkish actress.

İrtem completed her training at Yaşar University before her performance training at the Sadri Alışık Kültür Merkezi. She appeared in series such as Yasak Elma and Sandık Kokusu.

İrtem died in Kadıköy, on 15 June 2026, one day after her 35th birthday.

== Filmography ==
- Şeref Meselesi (2015)
- Paramparça (2015)
- O Hayat Benim (2016)
- Payitaht: Abdülhamid (2019)
- Bay Yanlış (2020)
- Mahkum (2021–2022)
- Yasak Elma (2022)
- Aile (2023)
- Sandık Kokusu (2023–2024)
- Kızılcık Şerbeti (2025)
