= Aybüke Pusat =

Turkish actress, dancer, and model (born 1995)

- Born: 25 February 1995 (age 31); Ankara, Turkey
- Education: Hacettepe University Ankara State Conservatory and Anadolu University
- Height: 1.74 m (5 ft 8 1/2 in)
- Beauty pageant titleholder
- Title: Miss Earth Turkey 2014
- Agency: ÖNEM GÜNAL MANAGEMENT
- Years active: 2014–present
- Major competition: Miss Turkey 2014

Aybüke Pusat (born 25 February 1995) is a Turkish actress, dancer, model and beauty pageant titleholder who was crowned Miss Earth Turkey 2014 and was supposed to represent her country at the Miss Earth 2014 pageant. Her maternal family is of Tatar descent (a Turkic ethnic subgroup). She graduated from ballet department of Hacettepe University Ankara State Conservatory. Also, she is studying distance education in business department of Anadolu University.

== Miss Earth 2014 ==
By winning Miss Earth Turkey, Pusat was supposed to fly to the Philippines in November to compete with almost 100 other candidates to be Alyz Henrich's successor as Miss Earth.

== Acting career ==
=== TV series ===
Pusat made her debut appearance in the popular TV series Medcezir as a supporting role in 2014. She then went on to play a series of supporting roles in comedy series Beş Kardeş (2015) and O Hayat Benim (2015–16). In 2016, she was offered a leading role in the comedy series Familya where she plays Su Beyoğlu, the only daughter of the Beyoğlu family, who along with her siblings, tries to mend things in their family after the death of their mother.

She rose to fame in 2017 for playing the headstrong, resilient female lead Dr. Bahar Kutlu in two seasons of Söz, one of Turkey's most popular and internationally acclaimed action drama, alongside Tolga Sarıtaş, who was nominated for an International Emmy Award (Best Performance by an Actor) for his role. In 2018, she went on to star in a leading role in Şahin Tepesi, an adaptation of the widely acclaimed US TV series Falcon Crest. However, Şahin Tepesi enjoyed a short run due to low local viewership ratings.

In 2019, she starred alongside Furkan Andıç in the romantic comedy Her Yerde Sen where she plays Selin Sever, a lively and intelligent interior architect who was forced to share a house with Andıç's character Demir Erendil, who was also her boss. Her Yerde Sen received international recognition and high praise after having won a Golden Lens Award from the Journalists' Association for its impeccable storytelling, directing, and cinematography. In 2020, both Pusat and Andıç won the Pantene Golden Butterfly Award for Best TV Couple. Subsequently, Her Yerde Sen was the only Turkish production to be named in The Guardian's list of 52 Romantic Comedies for Valentine's Day 2021.

With Engin Öztürk, She played in military series Sıfırıncı Gün for twice. She joined in fourth season of agent series Teşkilat.

=== Web series ===
Pusat was cast as the female lead in the Netflix dark comedy 50m2 alongside Engin Öztürk. She was subsequently cast in another BluTV original Alef: Mâl-i Hülya (the second instalment of the Alef series) with Medcezir co-star Taner Ölmez, as well as the BeIN original Hayaller ve Hayatlar alongside an ensemble cast including Özge Gürel, Melisa Aslı Pamuk, Serkay Tütüncü, Yusuf Çim and Ekin Mert Daymaz.

=== Film ===
In 2019, she took on a supporting role in the film Kapı, alongside Kadir İnanır, Vahide Perçin, Erdal Beşikçioğlu.

== Filmography ==
=== Film ===
Year	Title	Role	Notes
2019	Kapı	Nardin	Leading role

=== Web series ===
Year	Title	Role	Notes
2021	50m2	Dilara Adıvar	Leading role
2022	Alef: Mâl-i Hülya	Defne Andıç	Leading role
2022	Hayaller ve Hayatlar	Güneş	Leading role

=== TV series ===
Year	Title	Role	Notes
2014	Medcezir	Elif Denizer	Supporting role
2015	Beş Kardeş	Zeynep	Supporting role
2015–2016	O Hayat Benim	Zeynep	Supporting role
2016	Familya	Su Beyoğlu	Leading role
2017–2018	Söz	Bahar Kutlu Karasu	Leading role
2018	Şahin Tepesi	Verda Özden	Leading role
2019	Her Yerde Sen	Selin Sever Erendil	Leading role
2022–2023	Sıfırıncı Gün	Nisan	Leading role
2023–2025	Teşkilat	Neslihan Erdemsoy	Leading role
2025–2026	Halef: Köklerin Çağrısı	Melek Özdel	Leading role
Yakında	Eşref Tek	Derin	Leading role

Awards and achievements
Preceded by Ezgi Avcı	Miss Earth Turkey; 2014	Succeeded by Şevval Ayvaz
