= Cansu Tosun =

Turkish actress

- Born: Cansu Dicle Tosun; 26 January 1988 (age 38); Nuremberg, Germany
- Occupation: Actress
- Years active: 2011–present
- Spouse: Erkan Kolçak Köstendil (m. 2018; div. 2026)
- Children: 1
- Website: www.cansutosun.com.tr

Cansu Dicle Tosun (born 26 January 1988) is a German-born Turkish actress.

== Life and career ==
Tosun was born in 1988 in Germany. Her parents are from Kayseri. Her father is a post office manager in Nuremberg and her mother works in a store. She has a twin brother named Fırat. She studied ballet at the German Opera for 13 years and worked as a professional photo model. She graduated from Commerce School at the same time in Germany.

In Turkey, she started her career by working for TRT 1. She rose to prominence by playing the character of Neriman in the adaptation of Muazzez Tahsin Berkand's 1964 novel Küçük Hanımefendi between 2011 and 2012. In 2012, she was cast in Kanal D's series Kayıp Şehir as Zehra alongside Gökçe Bahadır, Taner Ölmez, İlker Kaleli. In 2013, she portrayed the character of Ayşen in an adaptation of Refik Halit Karay's 1954 novel Bugünün Saraylısı.

She then appeared in a supporting role in Star TV's series Göç Zamanı. She continued her career in television by playing roles in the series Familya, Bir Deli Sevda and historical series Mehmetçik Kut'ül Amare.

== Filmography ==
Film and television
Year	Title	Role	Notes
2011–2012	Küçük Hanımefendi	Neriman	Leading role / TV series
2012–2013	Kayıp Şehir	Zehra	Leading role / TV series
2013–2014	Bugünün Saraylısı	Ayşen Yılmaz	Leading role / TV series
2013	İksir	Buse	Leading role / film
2016	Göç Zamanı	Zümrüt	Supporting role / TV series
2016	Familya	Hare Bilgiç	Supporting role / TV series
2017	Bir Deli Sevda	Bahar Yılmaz	Leading role / TV series
2018–2019	Mehmetçik Kut'ül Amare	Fatma	Leading role / TV series
2023	Kirli Sepeti	Medine	Leading role / TV series
Soon	Susanlar	Feyza Güvenç	Supporting role / web series
