= Her Yerde Sen =

- Genre: Romantic comedy
- Based on: Just You
- Screenplay by: Deniz Yeşilgün; Esra Çetek Yılmazer
- Directed by: Ender Mıhlar; Volkan Özgümüs
- Starring: Furkan Andıç; Aybüke Pusat
- Music by: Alpay Göltekin; Zeynep Alasya; Caner Özkan
- Opening theme: "Her Yerde Sen" by Zeynep Alasya
- Country of origin: Turkey
- Original language: Turkish
- No. of seasons: 1
- No. of episodes: 23

Production
- Executive producers: Soner Güven; Seçil İssi
- Producers: Ömer Özgüner; Ümmü Burhan
- Cinematography: Necmettin Akdeniz; Ümit Çakmaksoy
- Editors: Emrullah Hekim; Bilal Ceran; Elif Danyal
- Production company: Karga Seven Pictures

Original release
- Network: Fox
- Release: 14 June – 23 November 2019

Her Yerde Sen (transl. You Are Everywhere) is a Turkish romantic comedy television series produced by Karga Seven Pictures for FOX. The series starred Furkan Andıç and Aybüke Pusat, and was directed by Ender Mıhlar. It premiered in Turkey on 14 June 2019 and concluded on 23 November 2019 after 23 episodes.

== Premise ==
The series follows Selin Sever and Demir Erendil, two people who independently purchase the same house and subsequently discover that they both have a claim to the property. Unable to resolve the dispute immediately, they are forced to share the house. Their disagreements continue in their professional lives when Demir turns out to be the new manager at Artemim, the architectural company where Selin works. The story follows their developing relationship amid the conflicts arising from their shared living arrangements and workplace.

== Episodes ==
| No. | Episode title | Original release date | Plot |
|---|---|---|---|
| 1 | Bölüm 1 | 14 June 2019 | Demir and Selin discover that they both claim ownership of the same house and are forced to live together. Their situation becomes increasingly complicated when Demir joins Selin's workplace as her new supervisor. |
| 2 | Bölüm 2 | 21 June 2019 | While Selin and Demir attempt to resolve their ownership dispute, Firuze and Leyla arrange a dinner to find a solution. Meanwhile, Operation Cheetah begins at the company to remove Demir from his position. |
| 3 | Bölüm 3 | 28 June 2019 | After visiting the police station to report a burglary, Selin and Demir encounter further complications. Firuze and Leyla devise another plan to bring them closer, while Demir attempts to save the company from losing an important client. |
| 4 | Güvenmek İstiyorum | 5 July 2019 | An incident involving Yıldırım and the Artemim team creates a crisis at the company. Demir demands accountability and asks Selin to make a difficult decision, while the ongoing Operation Cheetah faces an unexpected complication. |
| 5 | Yalnız Bırakma | 12 July 2019 | The team attempts to advance Operation Cheetah without Demir discovering their plans. Alara's unexpected visit to the house creates tension between Selin and Demir, while the arrival of Selin's family further complicates matters. |
| 6 | Sen Varsın | 19 July 2019 | Demir supports Selin when she encounters difficulties with her family, causing her to reconsider her opinion of him. Meanwhile, İbo and Ayda grow closer, and Burak discovers a significant clue concerning the photographs sent to him. |
| 7 | Sen Haklıydın | 26 July 2019 | Struggling with the consequences of her lies, Selin prepares to confess everything to Demir. As their feelings grow stronger, a surprise birthday celebration threatens to expose the secrets they have been keeping. |
| 8 | İkimiz Olsak | 2 August 2019 | During the birthday celebrations, Selin attempts to keep Demir's secrets hidden but encounters an unexpected guest. As Demir investigates Alara's secrets, Selin's confession leads him to make a sudden decision. |
| 9 | Gidecek Misin | 9 August 2019 | Demir discovers that Selin is the woman Vedat is interested in and becomes angry over her earlier deception. He sees a business presentation in Paris as an opportunity to distance himself from her, while Alara prepares for the trip. |
| 10 | 10. Bölüm | 23 August 2019 | Demir and Selin's disagreement over the Paris trip develops into a company holiday involving their colleagues and special guests. As Selin competes with Alara for Demir's attention, the relationship between Demir and Selin takes a romantic turn. |
| 11 | Aşk Yasak | 30 August 2019 | Just as Demir and Selin begin their relationship, they face a workplace rule prohibiting romantic relationships between colleagues. Demir struggles between his professional principles and his feelings, while Alara makes another attempt to separate them. |
| 12 | Sensizlik Zor | 6 September 2019 | The revelation of hidden secrets deeply affects Demir and shocks Selin. Burak makes a risky decision after witnessing Selin's distress, while Demir attempts to regain control of his life and deal with the consequences of their strained relationship. |
| 13 | Gizli Hayran | 13 September 2019 | As Artemim is divided into two companies, Demir begins to lose his influence. Selin attempts to win him back after confessing her feelings, while a secret admirer creates another complication in their relationship. |
| 14 | Aşka Kapıldım | 20 September 2019 | Although Demir and Selin are happy in their new relationship, Demir faces difficulties when the company's clients remain with Burak. His intervention in a problem involving Selin's work creates tension between them, while Burak discovers a potentially significant secret. |
| 15 | Yanındayım | 27 September 2019 | Eylül's unexpected arrival forces Demir to confront his past. He attempts to prevent these developments from affecting his relationship with Selin, while Burak becomes increasingly involved in the situation. |
| 16 | Dayanamam | 4 October 2019 | Selin's fear of losing Demir creates further complications in their relationship. The couple plans to spend a weekend together, but unexpected events disrupt their plans. Meanwhile, tensions between Demir and Eylül increase, leaving Selin caught between them. |
| 17 | Her Yerde Sen | 11 October 2019 | Eylül unexpectedly encounters Demir at home and discovers that Selin is the woman in his life. Meanwhile, Merve faces a personal crisis involving Bora, and Artemim's financial difficulties place Demir and Burak under increasing pressure. |
| 18 | Sensizlik | 18 October 2019 | After becoming stranded together at a mansion, Selin attempts to get to know Eylül better, much to Demir's concern. As Burak confronts Demir, the latter faces the possibility of losing everything and makes plans to take Selin away. |
| 19 | Beni Anla | 26 October 2019 | Selin discovers that the secret she has uncovered is only part of a much larger truth. Struggling with her conflicting emotions, she attempts to come to terms with the revelations, while Demir tries everything to prevent their relationship from falling apart. |
| 20 | Çok Sevmek | 2 November 2019 | Unable to process what she has discovered, Selin leaves their home and moves in with Ayda. Demir receives support from his friends as he attempts to manage both his personal problems and the growing crisis at Artemim, eventually facing a difficult decision. |
| 21 | Seninle Güzel | 9 November 2019 | After leaving the house, Demir takes steps to resolve the problems surrounding him. His growing influence at the company increases tensions with Burak, while Selin struggles with his absence and an unexpected guest brings further complications. |
| 22 | Kalbimin Sesi | 16 November 2019 | Following the events at Eylül's house, Burak faces criticism from those around him. Demir decides to establish new rules to resolve the problems between himself and Selin, while another threat emerges for Artemim. |
| 23 | Final | 23 November 2019 | As Artemim undergoes a financial investigation, Demir, Burak and Eylül make an important decision concerning the company. Meanwhile, the group comes together for Muharrem and Leyla, and Demir and Selin each prepare a surprise for the other. |

== Cast ==
The series features the following cast members:

- Furkan Andıç as Demir Erendil
- Aybüke Pusat as Selin Sever
- Ali Yağcı as Burak Yangel
- Beste Kökdemir as Eylül
- Aslıhan Malbora as Ayda Akman
- Ali Gözüşirin as İbrahim Tunç
- Deniz Işın as Merve Mutlu
- Fatih Özkan as Ferruh Özerdim
- Cem Cücenoğlu as Muharrem Usta
- Ayfer Tokatlı as Azmiye Boşgeçmez
- Ayşe Tunaboylu as Leyla Günbakan
- Binnur Şerbetçioğlu as Firuze Günbakan
- Aziz Caner Inan as Vedat Ayhan

== Production ==
Her Yerde Sen was produced by Karga Seven Pictures for FOX Turkey, directed by Ender Mıhlar, and written by Deniz Yeşilgün and Esra Çetek Yılmazer. Furkan Andıç and Aybüke Pusat lead the cast as Demir Erendil and Selin Sever, respectively. Ömer Özgüner and Ümmü Burhan served as producers. The series is based on the Taiwanese romantic comedy television series Just You (2013), which starred Aaron Yan and Puff Kuo.

== Broadcast ==
The series premiered on FOX Turkey on 14 June 2019. Its final episode aired on 23 November 2019. Contemporary media reports attributed the decision to conclude the series to its ratings performance.

== International distribution ==
In September 2019, international distributor Eccho Rights reached an agreement with Karga Seven Pictures to represent the series in the international television market under the title Everywhere I Go. Eccho Rights lists the series in its catalogue as a Turkish-language production from 2019, with an international format of 75 episodes of 45 minutes each.

| Country | International title | Language | Broadcaster / platform | Reference |
|---|---|---|---|---|
| Albania | Kudo bashkë | Albanian (subtitled) | TV Klan | |
| Bulgaria | Навсякъде ти | Bulgarian (voice-over) | bTV; bTV Lady | |
| India | Meri Duniya | Hindi | MX Player | |
| Hungary | Te vagy mindenhol | Hungarian | Izaura TV | |
| Italy | Everywhere I Go – Coincidenze d'amore | Italian | Rete 4; Mediaset Infinity | |
| Pakistan | Jahan Tum Wahan Hum | Urdu | Urdu 1 | |
| Poland | Wszędzie ty | Polish (voice-over) | Novelas+ | |
| Spain | En todas partes, tú | Spanish | Divinity | |
| Portugal | Everywhere I Go | Portuguese | STAR Life | |
| South Africa | Everywhere I Go | | Red Head Global (distribution rights) | |
| Namibia | Everywhere I Go | | Red Head Global (distribution rights) | |

== Awards and nominations ==
| Year | Award | Category | Recipient | Result |
|---|---|---|---|---|
| 2019 | Golden Butterfly Awards | Best Romantic Comedy Series | | Nominated |
| 2019 | Golden Butterfly Awards | Best Actor in a Romantic Comedy Series | Furkan Andıç | Nominated |
| 2019 | Golden Butterfly Awards | Best Actress in a Romantic Comedy Series | Aybüke Pusat | Nominated |
| 2019 | Golden Butterfly Awards | Best TV Couple | Aybüke Pusat and Furkan Andıç | Won |
| 2019 | Golden Butterfly Awards | Best Director | Ender Mıhlar | Nominated |
