= BluTV =

Turkish video streaming service

- Website type: OTT platform
- Available in: Turkish
- Dissolved: 15 April 2025; 17 months ago
- Successor: HBO Max
- Owners: Doğan Holding (2015–2023); Warner Bros. Discovery (2023–2025)
- Creator: Aydın Doğan Yalçındağ
- Website: www.blutv.com
- Commercial: Yes
- Registration: Required
- Launched: 2015
- Current status: Inactive

BluTV was a Turkish media provider offering streaming media and video on demand services via the internet. It was founded in 2015 under Doğan Holding by Aydın Doğan Yalçındağ and was later acquired by Warner Bros. Discovery. Accessible via computers, mobile devices, and smart TVs, the platform offered a variety of local and international content, including live TV broadcasts, films, series, sports, lifestyle, and adult genres.

On 19 January 2021, Discovery, Inc. acquired a 35% stake in BluTV, and the service became the Discovery+ exclusive distributor in Turkey in 5 May 2021.

On 6 December 2023, Warner Bros. Discovery (WBD) fully acquired BluTV. On 5 December 2024, it was announced that BluTV would merge into Max as part of WBD's global streaming consolidation strategy.

On 15 April 2025, BluTV was dissolved. All current BluTV subscribers were grandfathered into Max when it launched on the same date.

== BluTV programming ==
A list of TV shows, movies, and other content that was available on BluTV.

=== Original productions ===
BluTV's first original web series was Masum, released in 2017. Other original productions by BluTV include:

Title	Years	Notes
Sıfır Bir	2016–2019	Moved from YouTube
Çalınmış Hayatlar	2017	
Masum	2017	First original series
Sahipli	2017	
7 Yüz	2017	
140journos: Parayı Vuranlar	2018	
Bartu Ben	2018	
Yaşamayanlar	2018	
Dudullu Postası	2018	
Bozkır	2018–2025	
Behzat Ç.	2019	Moved from Star TV
Aynen Aynen	2019–2025	Moved from YouTube
Pavyon	2019–2025	
Yarım Kalan Aşklar	2020	
Ankara Havası	2020	
Boom by İbrahim Selim	2020–2021	
Sokağın Çocukları	2020–2024	
Alef	2020–2025	
Çıplak	2020–2025	Also listed under exclusive content
Saygı	2020–2021	
Bonkis	2021–2022	
Yeşilçam	2021	
Doğu	2021–2025	
Hiç	2021	
Acans	2021	
Börü 2039	2021–2025	
İlk ve Son	2021–2025	
Saklı	2021	
Şokopop Yeşilçam 101	2021	
Düğün	2021	
Podacto Stüdyo	2021	
Şamanın Yolunda	2021	
Karsu'nun Odası	2021	
Dün Dündür	2021	
Bizden Olur mu?	2022	
Çekiç ve Gül: Bir Behzat Ç. Hikayesi	2022–2025	
Yalnızım Mesut Bey!	2022–2025	
Kıyma	2022–2025	
Oyun	2022–2025	
40	2022–2025	
Liderlik Sırları	2022	
İnsanlar İkiye Ayrılır	2022	
Operasyon	2022	
Ben Bu Boşluğu Nasıl	2023	
Sen, Ben, O!	2023	
Deneme Çekimi	2023	
Prens	2023–2025	
Magarsus	2023–2025	
Mor Işıklar	2024	

=== Original licensed content ===
Title	Years	Notes
My Dead Ex	–	
Riverdale	2017–2023	
The Magicians	–	
Killing Eve	2018–2025	
Euphoria	2019–2025	
MacGyver	2016–2025	
T@gged	–	
Confess	–	
Superstition	–	
Light as a Feather	–	
Shadowhunters	2016–2019	
Game of Thrones	2011–2019	
Chernobyl	2019	
The Sopranos	1999–2007	
Sex and the City	1998–2004	
House of the Dragon	2022–2025	
Succession	2018–2023	

=== Exclusively on BluTV ===
Title	Years	Notes
The Last of Us	2023–2025	
The Handmaid's Tale	2017–2025	
Six Feet Under	2001–2005	
Normal People	2020–2025	
Gomorrah	2014–2021	
Efsane T	2020	
Çıplak	2020–2025	Also listed under original productions
Ramy	2019–2025	
