= Mushfig =

Mushfig is both a given name and a surname. Notable people with the name include:

- Mushfig Huseynov (born) Azerbaijani singular footballer
- Mushfig Rzayev (born 1998), Azerbaijani football
- Mushfig Shahverdiyev (born 1983), Azerbaijani actor
- Mikayil Mushfig (1908–1938), Azerbaijani poet
