= Journo =

Journo may refer to:

- JournoList, a Google Groups forum existing up to 2010
- 140journos, a news outlet covering news related to Turkey
- Journalist, a person who collects, writes, or distributes news or other current information to the public.
