= Keremcem =

Turkish musical artist and actor (born 1977)

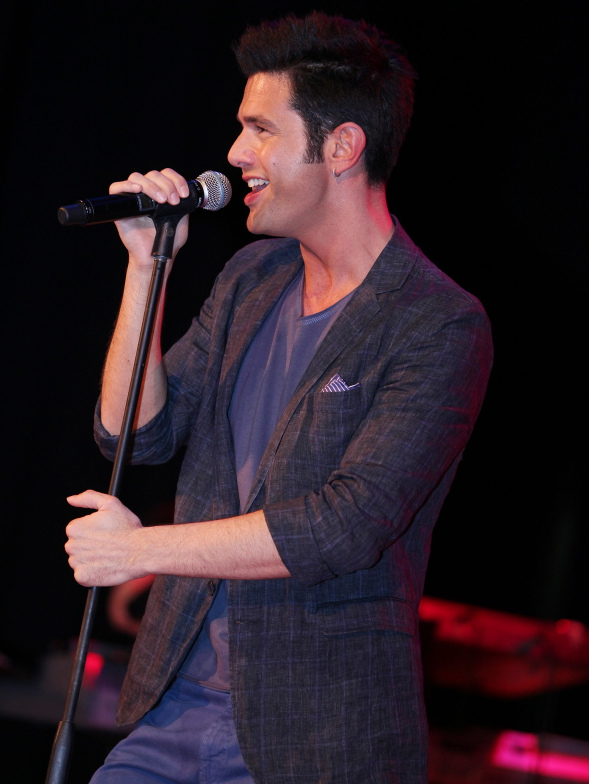
- Keremcem in 2012

Background information
- Born: Kerem Cem Dürük; December 28, 1977 (age 48); Muğla, Turkey
- Genres: Pop, R&B
- Occupations: Singer-songwriter, actor
- Instrument: Vocals
- Years active: 2001–present
- Website: keremcem.com.tr

Kerem Cem Dürük, known professionally as Keremcem, is a Turkish pop singer and actor. He is best known for popular series Aşk Oyunu and O Hayat Benim. He also hosted the short-lived television show Keremcem ile Söyle Söyleyebilirsen on Star TV.

== Biography ==
Keremcem was born on 28 December 1977 in Milas. He attended Milas Sakarya Primary School, before enrolling in İzmir Private Fatih College (junior high). He graduated from high school in Turgutreis in 1995. He graduated from Ege University (University of Aegean) majoring in International Relations in 2003. He started playing guitar in high school.

His first composition "Elimde Değil", meaning "not in my hands", was made in 1996 in Ankara. He came to Istanbul in 2001. During this period, his friend Yunus Adak composed "Eylül". Yonca Evcimik introduced him to Aykut Gürel and so began his professional musical career as a singer. Two solo albums; Eylül (2004), Aşk Bitti (2006) and a duet album Maia (2005, feat. Seden Gürel) were produced by Iremrecords. He performed over 130 concerts all over Turkey, Cyprus, and Germany. He also performed the starring role in two TV series; Aşk Oyunu (2005–2006), İki Yabancı (2007) and Elif (2008) played as lead role in the series.

== Discography ==
Year	Name	Company
2004	Eylül	İrem Records
2005	Eylül (Aşk Oyunu Bonus Track)	İrem Records
2005	Maia	İrem Records
2006	Aşk Bitti	İrem Records
2008	Ateşler İçinde	İrem Records
2009	Dokun	İrem Records
2011	Hayata	Pasaj Müzik

== Filmography ==
Year	Title	Role
2005	Kerem İle Aslı	Kerem
2005	Aşk Oyunu	Sarp Teksoy
2006	Çirkin Ördek Yavrusu ile Farecik	Çirkin Ördek Yavrusu
2007	İki Yabancı	Cem Arifoğlu
2007	Avrupa Yakası	Kerem
2008	Asteriks Olimpiyatlarda	Asteriks
2008	Elif	Ahmet Karabey
2008	Proje 13	Keremcem
2010	Keskin Bıçak	Eren
2011	Tövbeler Tövbesi	Oktay Berk
2014	O Hayat Benim	Ateş German
2014	İksir	Himself
2017	Küçük Ortak	Selim
2017	İki Yalancı	Serkan Gülbulak
2018	Aşk ve Mavi	Yaman
2019	Kimse Bilmez	Ali Hüroğlu
2021	Yetiş Zeynep	Engin
2022	Gül Masalı	Adnan Fuat Demirci
2023	Başım Belada	Azam
2026	Doktor: Başka Hayatta	Dr. Murat
2026-	Evlilik Güzeldir	Demir Koral

== Awards ==
List of awards Keremcem has won during his career

- 2005, POPSAV Başarı Ödülleri
  - En İyi Çıkış Yapan Şarkıcı (Best Breakthrough Artist)
- 2005, 33. Altın Kelebek Ödülleri
  - En İyi Çıkış Yapan Erkek Soloist (Best Breakthrough Male Soloist)
- 2005, Future Gençlik ve Müzik Dergisi
  - En İyi Çıkış Yapan Erkek Sanatçı (Best Breakthrough Male Artist)
- 2006, 13. Kral TV Video Müzik Ödülleri
  - En İyi Pop Erkek Sarkıcı (Best Pop Male Artist)
- 2006, Google Türkiye
  - Yılın En Çok Ziyaret Edilen Web Sitesi "keremcem.com" (Most Visited Web Site of the Year "keremcem.com"
- 2006, 10. İFA Ödülleri
  - En İyi Pop Erkek Şarkıcı (Best Pop Male Artist)
- 2006, NetBul Magazin
  - Türkiye'nin erkek pop star’ı (Turkey's male pop Star)
- 2007, Jetix
  - En Sevilen Türk Erkek Şarkıcı (The most popular Turkish male Singer)
- 2007, Walt Disney
  - HSM-2 Şarkılarını Kendi Diline En İyi Adapte Eden Şarkıcı (Best Adapted to he's songs in he's language Singer)
- 2008, Yılın En Has Bilişimcileri -Kadir Has Üni-
  - En İyi Resmi Web Sitesi www.keremcem.com.tr (Best Official Web Site www.keremcem.com.tr)
- 2009, Algida Max
  - En Sevilen Erkek Sanatçı (The most popular male Artists)
- 2009, Gerçek Pop
  - En İyi Orkestralı Video Klip "Sana Ferrari Gerekti" (Best Video Clip orchestral "Sana Ferrari Gerekti")
- 2010, Ayaklı Gazete
  - Türkiye'nin En Güzel Yüzlü Erkek Dizi Oyuncusu (Turkey's Most Beautiful Faces Female Player of the Series)
- 2010, Magazin Plus
  - Yılın En İyi Erkek Pop Sanatçısı (Best Pop Male Artist)
- 2010, Altın Kariyer Ödülleri -Muğla Üni.-
  - En İyi Türk Pop Sanatçısı (Best Turkish Pop Artist)
