= Feridun Düzağaç =

Turkish singer

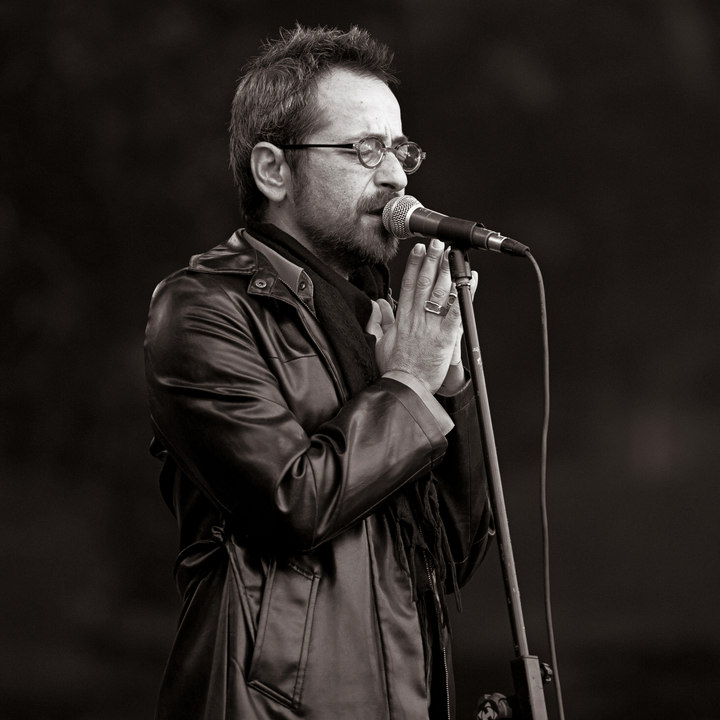
- Düzağaç in 2011

Background information
- Born: 10 October 1968 (age 57)
- Origin: Adana, Turkey
- Genres: Rock
- Occupations: Singer, songwriter, actor, musician, entertainer
- Instrument: Vocals
- Years active: 1988–present

Feridun Düzağaç (born 10 October 1968) is a Turkish rock music singer and songwriter, usually known for his melancholic songs.

== Music career ==
=== Early career ===
Feridun Düzağaç started his music career by forming a band called "TINI" ("TONE") in Mersin while studying in university. This band was formed in 1988 and Feridun Düzağaç was the vocalist of this band consisting five musicians. Other members of the band were Feridun Düzağaç's schoolmates. The first song that Feridun Düzağaç wrote was "Lavinia" which was a poem originally written by famous Turkish poet Özdemir Asaf. In 1990, Feridun Düzağaç and his 13 schoolmates wrote a book called "İlk Rüzgar" ("The First Wind") which contained many poems. In 1992, he graduated from the university. In November 1994, he released a demo album called "Öğrenci İndirimi" ("Student Discount") which contained songs that he performed when he was studying in university.

=== Professional career ===
In January 1997, he released his debut official album called "Beni Rahatta Dinleyin" ("Listen to Me in Comfort"). This album contained songs that he wrote when he was bearing arms. He released his second official album called "Köprüden Önce Son Çıkış" ("The Last Exit Before the Bridge") in July 1998.

In 2000, he participated in a compilation album called "Bülent Ortaçgil'e Saygı" ("In Honour of Bülent Ortaçgil") by performing a song called "Sevgi" ("Love"). He released " Tüm Hakları Yalnızlığıma Aittir" (" All Rights Reserved to My Loneliness") album in May 2001 and "Orjinal – Alt Yazılı" ("Original – Subtitled") album in 2003. The second one was the most successful album in his career. In August 2004 he released "Uzun Uzun Feridun Düzağaç" ("Long Long Feridun Düzağaç") album which mostly contained concert performances. Through 2004 Feridun Düzağaç appeared in hundreds of concerts.

On 4 January 2006, Feridun Düzağaç released "Bir Devam Filmi/Siyah Beyaz Türkçe Dublaj" ("A Sequel Film/Black and White Turkish Dubbing") album. On 22 January 2008, he released his sixth album called "Uykusuza Masallar" ("Tales for Sleepless People"). This album was more optimistic in contrast his previous albums. Feridun Düzağaç released his last album called "FD7" in March 2010.

== Discography ==
Feridun Düzağaç released a demo release, seven original releases and a live release in his career.

=== Albums ===
- Beni Rahatta Dinleyin (June 1997) (Prestij Müzik)
- Köprüden Önce Son Çıkış (July 1998) (Prestij Müzik)
- Tüm Hakları Yalnızlığıma Aittir (May 2001) (Universal / Neşe Müzik)
- Orjinal - Alt Yazılı (April 2003) (Bay Müzik)
- Bir Devam Filmi / Siyah Beyaz Türkçe Dublaj (September 2005) (Pasaj Müzik)
- Uykusuza Masallar (December 2007) (Sony Music)
- FD7 (March 2010) (İrem Records / Sony Music)
- Flu (11 March 2013) (DMC)
- Başka (2 October 2015) (Sony Music)
- 10'a Özel (1 March 2019) (DMC)
- Sakin [with İsimsiz Orkestra] (30 April 2021) (Sony Music)

=== Music videos ===
==== From Beni Rahatta Dinleyin album ====
- Lavinia
- Beyaz
- Buralar Soğuk

==== From Köprüden Önce Son Çıkış album ====
- Unut Beni
- Aşkın E Hali

==== From Tüm Hakları Yalnızlığıma Aittir album ====
- Dipteyim Sondayım Depresyondayım
- Uçak

==== From Orjinal – Alt Yazılı album ====
- F.D. :)
- Alev Alev
- Boş Ders Şarkısı
- Cumartesi
- Nadas

==== From Bir Devam Filmi/Siyah Beyaz Türkçe Dublaj album ====
- Deli

==== From Uykusuza Masallar album ====
- Beni Bırakma
- Söz Ver
- Çok Aşık
- Hazırcevap

==== From FD7 album ====
- Mütamadiyen Ağlıyorum
- Hayat Neden Şekil Yapıyor

==== From Flu album ====
- Senin Yüzünden
- Tek Başına

==== From Başka album ====
- Biçare
- Kül (Demli Versiyon)

==== From 10'a Özel album ====
- Dinle
- Sana...toryum

== Awards ==
- Best video clip in Kral TV Video Music Awards – 2009 with "Beni Bırakma" video clip

== Cinema/TV career ==
Düzağaç is not a professional actor, but he acted in several movies and TV series.

Year	Title	English translation	Format	Role	Reference
2004	Gece 11:45	11.45 pm	Drama	Mehmet (starring role)	
2006	2 Süper Film Birden	2 Super Films at the Same Time	Drama, comedy	?	
2008	Aşk Tutulması	Amative Eclipse	Romantic comedy	Doctor	
2008	Derman	Cure	TV series	?	
2008	Binbir Gece	Thousand and One Nights	TV series	Özcan	
2018	Hadi Be Oğlum	Come On My Son	Drama	Feridun	
2019	Güzelliğin Portresi	Portrait of Beauty	Movie	Asil	
