= Tolga Tekin =

Turkish actor (born 1973)

- Born: 19 March 1973 (age 53); Ankara, Turkey
- Occupation: Actor
- Years active: 1996–present
- Spouse: Zeynep Koltuk (m. 2013; div. 2014)

Tolga Tekin (born 19 March 1973) is a Turkish actor.

After finishing his studies at Private Arı College in 1992, he enrolled in the Hacettepe University State Conservatory and graduated in 1996 with a degree in theatre studies. He then passed the entrance exam to the Turkish State Theatres and started working at the Adana State Theatre. After working at the Adana State Theatre between 1996–2004, he joined the Ankara State Theatre. For four years, he had a role in the comedy series Bizim Evin Halleri. He has continued to work at the Ankara State Theatre. In 2020, Tekin had a recurring role in the Netflix original docudrama Rise of Empires: Ottoman. He also appeared in another original series by this platform, titled 50M2.

== Filmography ==
- Eşref Rüya - 2025
- İstanbul Ansiklopedisi - 2025
- Kızıl Goncalar - Abdurrahim Vahit Güneş - 2024
- Unfruitful Times - 2024
- Hayatımın Neşesi - 2023
- Aktris - 2023
- Taçsız Prenses - 2023
- Dünya Hali - Güven - 2021
- 50M2 - Mesut - 2021
- Akıncı - Orhan - 2021
- Rise of Empires: Ottoman - 2020
- Bizi Hatırla - Kaan - 2019
- Kelebekler - Cemal - 2018
- Bir Litre Gözyaşı - Muzo - 2018
- Vatanım Sensin - Mehmet Âkif Ersoy - 2018
- Rüzgârda Salınan Nilüfer - Korhan -2016
- Paramparça : Cevdet Mercan - Özkan Gülpınar - 2014
- Behzat Ç. Ankara Yanıyor : Serdar Akar - Gorbaçov -2013
- Muhteşem Yüzyıl : Durul Taylan - Yağmur Taylan - Barbaros Hayreddin Pasha - 2012
- Çıplak Gerçek : Nedim- 2012
- Behzat Ç. Seni Kalbime Gömdüm : Serdar Akar - Gorbaçov - 2011
- Reis: Yunus - 2011
- Zenne: Cihan - 2011
- Kardelen : Mehmet Güneş - Photographer - 2010
- Kapalı Çarşı : Ömür Atay - Mustafa - 2010
- Deniz Yıldızı : Gürsel Ateş - (2009)
- Bizim Evin Halleri : Samet Polat - Safa - 2008

== Awards ==
- 2011: Baykal Saran Theatre Award (Yastık Adam)
