= Sandık Kokusu =

Turkish television series

- Genre: Drama
- Written by: Melis Civelek; Zeynep Gür
- Directed by: Nezaket Coşkun; Altan Dönmez
- Starring: Demet Akbağ; Özge Özpirinçci; Engin Öztürk; Metin Akdülger; Necip Memili
- Composers: Cem Tuncer; Emre Akdeniz
- Country of origin: Turkey
- Original language: Turkish
- No. of seasons: 2
- No. of episodes: 50

Production
- Executive producer: Saner Ayar
- Production company: O3 Medya

Original release
- Network: Show TV
- Release: 6 December 2023 – 19 March 2025

Sandik Kokusu (English title: I Am Mother) is a Turkish drama television series written by Melis Civelek and Zeynep Gür and produced by O3 Medya. It aired on Show TV from 6 December 2023 to 19 March 2025. The series stars Demet Akbag, Özge Özpirinçci and Engin Öztürk.

== Cast ==
- Demet Akbağ as Filiz Çelik
- Özge Özpirinçci as Karsu Çelik
- Engin Öztürk as Bora Bozbeyli
- Metin Akdülger as Atilla Saran
- Necip Memili as Reha Özkan
- Ece İrtem as Hande
- Nalan Okçuoğlu as Türkan
- Emre Şen as Ekrem
- Ömer Nadir Civelek as Ömer
- Mina Akdin as Tılsım
- Sarp Kaan Altınçapa as Kuzey
- Miray Yeral as Selin
- Uğur Yücel as Hasan Başkaya
- Meriç Aral as Irmak Çelik
- Serkay Tütüncü as Kıvanç
- Gözde Seda Altuner as Gülnaz Başkaya
- İpek Özağan as Nazlı Başkaya
- Nesrin Cavadzade as Ayça
- Pamir Pekin as Hakan
- Tufan Günaçan as Hüseyin
- Tarık Şerbetçioğlu as İhsan
- Zerrin Nişancı as Nazan Bozbeyli
- İnci Şen as Şükran Özkan
- Şahin Sancak as Ozan
- Levent Can as Adnan
- Kayhan Açıkgöz as Cevdet
- Arya Bozabalı as İpek
- Feri Baycu Güler as Hülya
- Kübra Yılmaz as Yeşim
- Kadir Polatçı as Komiser Kemal
- Ali Yağcı as Can Kardeş
- Mustafa Başalan as The man who kidnapped Deniz
- Seda Türkmen as Lale Özkan
- Sercan Badur as Mert Melek
- Aydan Şener as Feryal Aksoy
