= Bahar Şahin =

Turkish actress (born 1997)

- Born: Elif Bahar Şahin; 4 May 1997 (age 29); Ankara, Turkey
- Occupation: Actress
- Years active: 2015–present

Elif Bahar Şahin (born 4 May 1987) is a Turkish actress.

== Life and career ==
Bahar Şahin was born in Ankara in 1997. Her family is originally from Artvin, and, when she was 12 years old, she settled with her family in Istanbul where she pursued her education and training life there. She joined the theatre classes during her school years. Şahin made her television debut in 2015 with the series O Hayat Benim. Later, she took part in films such as Yol Arkadaşım, Yol Arkadaşım 2, and İyi Oyun and was cast in a number of series such as Lise Devriyesi and Servet. Between 2019 and 2020, she rose to prominence by playing the character of Ceren in the series Zalim İstanbul, for which she received a Golden Butterfly Award nomination for Best Actress. In 2020, she made her debut in the series İyi Aile Babası and depicted the character of Yağmur.

== Filmography ==
Television
Year	Title	Role	Notes
2014–2017	O Hayat Benim	Müge Atahan	Supporting role
2017	Lise Devriyesi	Işıl Yılmaz	Leading role
2017	Kayıtdışı	İnci	Supporting role
2018	Servet	Ferah Feza	Leading role
2019–2020	Zalim İstanbul	Ceren Yılmaz Karaçay	Leading role
2022	Gülümse Kaderine	Eda	Leading role
2023	Tetikçinin Oğlu	Sibel Kayahan	Supporting role
Films
Year	Title	Role	Notes
2017	Oha Diyorum	Bahar	Leading role
2017	Yol Arkadaşım	Cemre	Supporting role
2018	Yol Arkadaşım 2	Cemre	Supporting role
2018	İyi Oyun	Naz	Leading role
2023	Roza	Ceylan	Leading role
TBA	Hiç		
Web
Year	Title	Role	Notes
2022	Duran	Aslı	Leading role

== Awards and nominations ==
- Promising Actor - Second International İzmir Film Festival (2019)
- Best Actress (nominated) - 46th Golden Butterfly Awards (2020)
