= 140journos =

Turkish media publisher

- Website: https://140journos.com/english/

140journos, is an Istanbul-based Turkish media publisher that produces and publishes visual stories, documentaries and qualified research. It was founded by Engin Önder who became disenchanted with the state of Turkish media on January 19, 2012. Önder, who started a grassroots citizen journalism movement, was later chosen as “the man transforming journalism in Turkey” by TIME Magazine in 2015.

Following a comprehensive revamp and repositioning, 140journos transformed itself from a citizen journalism organization to a professional new media publisher that got popular among young generation with its own unique creative style in journalism with the creative lead of Berkant Akarcan, creative director at 140journos. 140journos produces original documentaries that include in-depth interviews on various political, social, economic issues by merging cinematographic storytelling with journalistic content. In addition to its popular new-age documentaries, 140journos publishes political articles, e-books, organizes online/offline debate groups and develops open-source mobile/web applications that enable citizens to further engage with politics through technology.

Today, 140journos has 1.5 million followers across YouTube, Twitter, Instagram and Facebook and employs 20 full-time employees consisting of senior and junior journalists, researchers, editors, video editors, creative directors and art directors.

81% of the followers are aged 18–34, which shows that 140journos is a major news outlet followed by millennials. As an R&D experiment in journalism in the new media age through creative interventions, free interfaces and tools, 140journos finds new ways for free expression. 140journos has not only been producing content but also has developed a sustainable business model through methods like advertising production for brands, content licensing, donations and ticketed entertainment shows that bring spotlight to journalistic content for more than 8 years in a country like Turkey, where difficulty of conducting free press activities has been recognized to be one of the hardest in the world.

140journos' innovative approach to journalism has made them the subject matter of many case studies that have been conducted by prestigious institutions such as the Nieman Lab for Journalism. Zeynep Tüfekçi also devoted a portion of her book, “Twitter and Tear Gas” which is about protests in the age of social media, to inform the readers on how 140journos uses social media to disseminate news.

== History ==
140journos was first established as a citizen journalism platform broadcasting over Twitter in Turkey by Engin Önder. Önder tells that his intention was to find an innovative approach to circumventing media blackout and censorship by serving the Turkish public with crowdsourced and verified news as Turkey is ranked 157th out of 180 countries in the World Press Freedom Index, published by the media watchdog Reporters Without Borders. The inspiration came after Önder observed how senior journalist Serdar Akinan covered the Uludere Massacre, where 34 civilians were killed, over social media after a media blackout in late 2011.

The publisher operates on social media platforms such as YouTube, Instagram, WhatsApp and Twitter. The approach to publishing comes from an urge to understand and make people understand the nature of Turkish society by merging creativity with journalism. As of today, 140journos publishes their content mainly on YouTube where they have garnered more than 100 million views.

140journos is derived from a combination of two references to popular culture, 140 used to be the character limit on a Twitter post and journos means journalist. The Twitter account was created on January 19, 2012 during a memorial held in honor of Hrant Dink, a prominent journalist who was assassinated in 2007. It was founded by Engin Onder and his friends who were technologically literate but never had experience in the field of journalism.

The platform was designed to be an online outlet that "citizen journalists" would send over their content to be solicited, verified and disseminated by the 140journos editorial staff over the platform to be delivered to the Turkish public. The public contribution was limited but Önder and his friends would attend politically controversial hearings such as the KCK, Ergenekon and OdaTV hearings to neutrally and impartially cover the trials and to publish news that the mainstream media was not reporting about.

Gezi Park protests were a turning point for 140journos as people turned to alternative media sources as they felt mainstream media weren't adequately covering the events that were taking place. The bipartisan coverage of the protests and curation of content increased the public trust in the platform. Gezi Park protests increased peoples' reliance on social media publishers as their source of information and the number of 140journos followers went up from 8.000 to 30.000 over 3 months.

After Gezi Park protests 140journos became a grassroots organization that regularly pulled content from more than 250 volunteers across Turkey. According to Twitter analytics data from 2015, 140journos receives approximately 6 million monthly interactions and 200,000 daily interactions. With growing public interest towards citizen journalism, 140journos conducted citizen journalism workshops across Turkey with the coordination of universities, NGOs, local municipalities. The workshops attracted a lot of interest and 140journos educated hundreds of college students on the intricacies of citizen journalism such as how to verify content. Some workshop attendees later on got jobs at 140journos as editors.

140journos opens an internship program during different stages of the year, but the most well known is the summer internship program. The internship program attracts a lot of students and graduates from leading colleges around Turkey. The internship program not only aims to find talent but aims to raise young journalists.

== 140journos on Digital Platforms ==
140journos has produced documentaries for the Turkish streaming service BluTV. The documentaries include 2018-dated Parayı Vuranlar, a docuseries consisting of 3 episodes and Sıkışmışlık, a psychological thriller as a 6-episode docuseries in 2019.

== Directors ==
140journos represents and works with the renowned war photographers such as Çağdaş Erdoğan and Kürşad Bayhan.

Kürşad Bayhan is a former war photographer and has been working in active conflict zones since 2004. Bayhan spent his time photographing the scenery of the conflict zones in the Middle East Region. His photograph “The Boy with the Blue Pacifier” which he shot during the Lebanese Israeli war in 2006 gathered interest from the journalism community. Bayhan has also won Best Photography Book award from TIME Magazine Photo District News Editors Annual in 2014 thanks to the success of his book that tells the story of refugees, “Away From Home”. Bayhan draws inspiration from stories that are associated with environmental issues, immigration, poverty and conflicts. He has directed documentaries for 140journos such the North series, Ida Mountains, Bold Pilot and Fikirtepe.

Çağdaş Erdoğan is a director who worked as a conflict photographer. His works explore the underground and slum scenes of Turkey. He currently resides in Berlin and shoots documentaries about the intermingled relations of the Turkish diaspora living in different parts of Germany.
