= Gecenin Kraliçesi =

Turkish television series

- Also known as: Queen of the Night
- Gecenin Kraliçesi
- Starring: Murat Yıldırım; Meryem Uzerli; Ugur Polat; Funda Eryiğit; Seda Akman; Selim Bayraktar; Burak Deniz; Deniz Celiloğlu
- Country of origin: Turkey
- No. of seasons: 1
- No. of episodes: 15

Production
- Production location: Istanbul

Original release
- Network: Star TV
- Release: 12 January – 19 April 2016

Gecenin Kraliçesi (transl. Night Queen) is a Turkish TV show released on Star TV in 2016. The leading roles in the series are played by Meryem Uzerli, Murat Yıldırım, Ugur Polat, Selim Bayraktar, Burak Deniz, Seda Akman, and Funda Eryiğit.

== Plot summary ==
Kartal's father was murdered by two of his best friends, Aziz and Osman, when he was 6 to 7 years old. Osman fled after the murder, fearful that Aziz would kill him next. Meanwhile, Kartal was raised by Aziz alongside his two children, Esra and Mert. When Esra was five years old, their mother died while giving birth to Mert. As he grew older, Kartal was arranged to marry Esra and came to be in charge of Aziz's business. It was through this position that he was able to travel to France accompanied by his brother, Emre. While in France, Kartal met a girl named Selin, who turned out to be Osman's daughter. Despite Kartal's marriage to Esra, Kartal and Selin fell in love.

When Kartal returned to Turkey and requested a divorce from Esra, she attempted to murder him and take her own life. In addition, Aziz threatened to kill Selin because he wanted to break up her and Kartal. To prevent any misfortune, Kartal broke Selin's heart by telling her that he didn't love her and that he was already married to someone else. Selin returned to Turkey four years later with her three-year-old son, who was fathered by Kartal. In Turkey, Selin met Aziz, and they married after he fell in love with her. Selin had travelled to Turkey to bring vengeance to the man who had attempted to murder her father. When she discovered that her father was involved in the scam, she got him arrested and sentenced to prison. However, when Aziz's family discovered that he was a killer, they all turned against him, leading to him committing suicide. Despite repeated murder attempts, Esra reconciled with Selin a month later. Mert apologized to Kartal for presuming he was only looking for a way to take their money. Kartal and Esra divorced, and Esra went to a mental institution for treatment, allowing Kartal to marry Selin.

== Cast ==
=== Main ===
- Meryem Uzerli as Selin Bulut
- Murat Yıldırım as Kartal Sakallıoğlu
- Uğur Polat as Aziz Alkan
- Burak Deniz as Mert Alkan
- Funda Eryiğit as Esra Alkan Sakallıoğlu
- Selim Bayraktar as Hakan Tasci
- Seda Akman as Hüma Alkan Tasci
- Deniz Celiloğlu as Emre

=== Supporting ===
- Ömür Arpaci as Sadik Bulut
- Derya Beserler as Elif
- Naz Sayiner as Burcu Tasci
- Pervin Ünalp as Fatma
- Reha Özcan as Osman Bulut
- Kaan Irevül as Osman Bulut Jr.
- Burak Demir as Oktay
- Gözde Kansu as Zerrin
