= Linsey Marr =

American scientist

Linsey Chen Marr
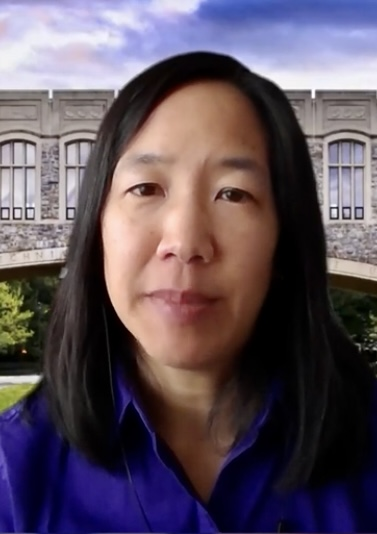
- Marr in 2022
- Education: Harvard University; University of California, Berkeley
- Awards: MacArthur Fellowship; Member, National Academy of Engineering
- Scientific career
- Workplaces: Massachusetts Institute of Technology; Virginia Tech
- Thesis: Changes in ozone sensitivity to precursor emissions on diurnal, weekly, and decadal time scales (2002)

Linsey Chen Marr is an American scientist who is a University Distinguished Professor in the Charles E. Via, Jr. Department of Civil and Environmental Engineering at Virginia Tech. Her research considers the interaction of nanomaterials and viruses with the atmosphere. During the COVID-19 pandemic Marr studied how SARS-CoV-2 and other airborne pathogens could be transported in air. In 2023, she was elected to the National Academy of Engineering and named a MacArthur Fellow.

== Early life and education ==
Marr studied engineering at Harvard University and graduated summa cum laude in 1996. During her undergraduate degree Marr developed an energy efficient lamp. She moved to the University of California, Berkeley for her graduate studies, where she worked in the department of environmental engineering. Her doctoral research considered how ozone levels were impacted by transport, population and industrial development. Marr joined Massachusetts Institute of Technology as a postdoctoral researcher, where she worked alongside Mario J. Molina. At MIT, she collected data to better understand pollution in Mexico, joining a measurement campaign on board a mobile scientific laboratory. As part of the campaign Marr tried to track down Mexico's most significant polluters, following taxi drivers as they made their way around Mexico City. The research informed environmental policy in Mexico and was proposed as a means to protect the inhabitants of other over polluted megacities.

== Research and career ==
Marr joined the faculty at Virginia Tech in 2003, where she established her own research group that investigates how engineered nanomaterials interact with the atmosphere. Marr showed that when released into the air, engineered nanomaterials can aggregate with other matter to form structures of various sizes (in the nm and μm length scales).

Beyond nanomaterials, Marr has considered how airborne pathogens pollute the atmosphere. To Marr, airborne pathogens are self-replicating assemblies of nanoparticles. In 2013 she was awarded a National Institutes of Health (NIH) New Innovator award to study virus transmission by bioaerosols. Her early research considered the spread of influenza, looking at the viral concentration in the air of aeroplanes and play centres. She showed that it was in childcare centres that the influenza viral load was highest, and it was the lowest in hospitals. In an attempt to understand these findings, Marr has studied the viral and bacterial microbiome in different environments. Marr has demonstrated that viruses were more active in very high (> 98%) and relatively low (< 50%) humidity. In an effort to establish the dynamics of these pathogens, Marr has developed sensitive, multi-layer sensors. The sensors include a custom-DNA that has been designed to immobilise specific viruses, which are subsequently bound to another DNA strand which can be attached to a gold nanoparticle for viral detection using Raman spectroscopy.

Alongside virus transmission and nanomaterial – atmosphere interactions, Marr has investigated the emissions and transport of air pollutants. She was appointed the Charles P. Lunsford Professor of Civil and Environmental Engineering in 2018.

=== COVID-19 ===
During the COVID-19 pandemic Marr studied airborne disease transmission of SARS-CoV-2. She believed that the virus could be transmitted via inhalation of air contaminated with SARS-CoV-2 aerosols. Throughout the pandemic, Marr provided advice to the general public about the transmission of airborne viruses, and how they interacted with and survived on surfaces. Marr said that she would be concerned about transmission of the virus in elevators, because they have little mechanical ventilation and are a confined space in which the virus may spread. After the Skagit County chorale resulted in 75% of the choir members falling ill with COVID-19, Marr told the Los Angeles Times that the event should be a "wake up call" to members of the public who thought social distancing was over the top. As for other mechanisms by which the virus may spread, Marr has remarked that there is no such thing as a "safe" distance to stay from one another. She said that infected runners may release more virus into the air than walkers, because they would be breathing harder, but that they would also create a more turbulent stream of air around them, which could act to dilute the viral load. She recommended that runners keep at least ten feet apart from other members of the public. In early April 2020 Marr told Chemical & Engineering News that she believed that face masks should be worn to prevent the spread of the virus. Marr predicted that the viral transmission may decrease slightly during the summer, but that the difference would not be particularly significant as people spend more time in air conditioned rooms.

Marr had long doubted the correctness of the World Health Organization advice on transmission of viruses by aerosols, namely that the line between droplets and aerosols should be drawn at 5 microns, commenting "The physics of it is all wrong", and claiming that particles much larger than 5 microns could stay afloat and behave like aerosols, depending on humidity, heat, and air speed. In 2010 she installed air samplers in day care centres and airplanes and found flu viruses in the air, in small particles which had stayed in the air for hours.

In January 2020, Marr reviewed a research paper by Yuguo Li which found that the long-established 5-micron boundary was fallacious and that most flu, colds, and other respiratory illnesses spread through aerosols, and not droplets. She wrote of it "This work is hugely important in challenging the existing dogma about how infectious disease is transmitted in droplets and aerosols." In October 2020, Marr was a co-signatory of a letter in Science urging epidemiologists to abandon the 5-micron threshold.

Marr was one of the authors of "How Did We Get Here: What Are Droplets and Aerosols and How Far Do They Go? A Historical Perspective on the Transmission of Respiratory Infectious Diseases", published on 28 April 2021 as a preprint and in October 2021 in the Royal Society's Interface Focus theme issue on COVID-19. She, Li, and two other aerosol scientists then published an editorial in The BMJ under the heading "Covid-19 Has Redefined Airborne Transmission". On April 30, the WHO changed its online advice on the transmission of COVID-19, accepting that it can spread by aerosols as well as larger droplets, and Zeynep Tufekci reported in The New York Times that a big news story had passed almost unnoticed. The Centers for Disease Control and Prevention also made changes to CDC guidance, placing the inhalation of aerosols at the top of its list of how COVID-19 spreads.

== Awards and honors ==
- 1996 Harvard Phi Beta Kappa
- 1996 National Science Foundation Graduate Research Fellowship
- 1999 US Environmental Protection Agency STAR Graduate Research Fellowship
- 2006 Virginia Tech College of Engineering Outstanding New Assistant Professor
- 2006 National Science Foundation CAREER Award
- 2007 Virginia Tech College of Engineering Faculty Fellow
- 2010 Virginia Tech Civil Engineering Alumni Teaching Excellence Award
- 2013 National Institutes of Health New Innovator Award
- 2014 Virginia Tech Dean's Award for Excellence in Research
- 2014 Virginia Tech Innovator Award
- 2016 United States Environmental Protection Agency Level III Scientific and Technological Achievement award
- 2017 Fulbright scholar
- 2017 Outstanding Reviewer, Aerosol Science and Technology
- 2018 Elected Fellow of the International Society of Indoor Air Quality and Climate
- 2019 Virginia Tech Excellence in Teaching Award
- 2019 Outstanding Reviewer, Environmental Science: Processes and Impacts
- 2020 Appointed to the Board of Environmental Science and Toxicology of the National Academies of Sciences, Engineering, and Medicine
- 2021 Fellow, American Association for Aerosol Research
- 2021 Susanne Hering Award, American Association for Aerosol Research
- 2021 UC Berkeley Civil and Environmental Engineering Academy of Distinguished Alumni
- 2021 Virginia Tech Ut Prosim Scholar Award (highest honor for faculty)
- 2022 Walter J. Weber, Jr. AEESP Frontier in Research Award
- 2022 Outstanding Faculty Award from the State Council of Higher Education for Virginia (SCHEV)
- 2022 Fellow, American Geophysical Union
- 2022 Jacob Bjerknes Lecture Award, American Geophysical Union
- 2023 Virginia Tech University Distinguished Professor
- 2023 Southeastern Universities Research Association Distinguished Scientist Award
- 2023 Elected to the National Academy of Engineering
- 2023 MacArthur Fellow

== Selected publications ==
- Marr, Linsey C.; Kirchstetter, Thomas W.; Harley, Robert A.; Miguel, Antonio H.; Hering, Susanne V.; Hammond, S. Katharine (1999). "Characterization of Polycyclic Aromatic Hydrocarbons in Motor Vehicle Fuels and Exhaust Emissions". Environmental Science & Technology. 33 (18): 3091–3099. Bibcode:1999EnST...33.3091M. doi:10.1021/es981227l. ISSN 0013-936X.
- Wills, Zachary; Marr, Linsey; Zinn, Kai; Goodman, Corey S; Van Vactor, David (1999). "Profilin and the Abl Tyrosine Kinase Are Required for Motor Axon Outgrowth in the Drosophila Embryo". Neuron. 22 (2): 291–299. doi:10.1016/s0896-6273(00)81090-9. ISSN 0896-6273. PMID 10069335. S2CID 6961544.
- Marr, Linsey C.; Harley, Robert A. (2002). "Spectral analysis of weekday–weekend differences in ambient ozone, nitrogen oxide, and non-methane hydrocarbon time series in California". Atmospheric Environment. 36 (14): 2327–2335. Bibcode:2002AtmEn..36.2327M. doi:10.1016/s1352-2310(02)00188-7. ISSN 1352-2310.
- Randall, Katherine; Ewing, E. Thomas; Marr, Linsey; Jimenez, Jose; and Bourouiba, L, "How Did We Get Here: What Are Droplets and Aerosols and How Far Do They Go? A Historical Perspective on the Transmission of Respiratory Infectious Diseases" (April 15, 2021, published April 28, 2021) Available at SSRN: https://ssrn.com/abstract=3829873

In 2016 Marr was appointed to the editorial board of Environmental Science: Processes & Impacts.

== Personal life ==
Marr has two children. She is an ironman triathlete.
