= 50m2 =

Turkish television series

- Genre: Thriller; Drama
- Written by: Burak Aksak
- Directed by: Selçuk Aydemir
- Starring: Engin Öztürk; Aybüke Pusat; Cengiz Bozkurt
- Country of origin: Turkey
- Original language: Turkish
- No. of seasons: 1
- No. of episodes: 8

Production
- Production location: Istanbul
- Running time: 45–50 minutes
- Production company: BKM Film

Original release
- Network: Netflix
- Release: 27 January 2021

50m2 is a 2021 Turkish thriller drama television series directed by Selçuk Aydemir, written by Burak Aksak, and starring Engin Öztürk, Aybüke Pusat, and Cengiz Bozkurt. The show was released on Netflix on 27 January 2021, consisting of one season for a total of eight episodes.

== Synopsis ==
50m2 tells the story of a hitman named Gölge (transl: Shadow), an orphan, who is trying to find his identity. Gölge works for a man named Servet Nadir and seeks to find out what happened to his parents. Servet knows the truth but refuses to tell him, as he was the cause of their death. Gölge eventually finds a journalist claiming to know his family. Servet sends his henchman, Stain, to kill Gölge, but he shoots the journalist instead, and Gölge gets away, badly wounded after a fight with Stain.

Gölge breaks into a tailor shop whose owner died recently, where he collapses. When he is discovered the next day by Mukhtar, the local community leader, he pretends to be Adem, the son of the deceased tailor. Mukhtar, a trusting man, takes him in, and Gölge tries to blend into the community. A young man named Yakup grows suspicious and begins to poke into Gölge's background.

Servet continues to search for Gölge, who begins to have visions of what happened when he was a child. At first he believes that he murdered his own parents, and later remembers that he only killed his father and that Servet played a role in the deaths. Gölge helps the people in the community when Servet tries to steal their houses in a suspicious land deal. He also begins to fall for Mukhtar's beautiful daughter, Dilara, who reciprocates his feelings.

In the end, Gölge confronts Servet in his penthouse, and the latter reveals the full story about Gölge's parents and mentions that his mother is still alive. He entices Gölge to have a drink, which he has laced. Gölge, realizing he has been drugged, points his gun at Servet, who draws his own weapon. The show cuts to black as a gunshot is heard.

== Cast and characters ==
- Engin Öztürk as Adem/Shadow
- Aybüke Pusat as Dilara
- Cengiz Bozkurt as Muhtar
- Kürşat Alnıaçık as Servet
- Tolga Tekin as Mesut
- Özgür Emre Yıldırım as Civan
- Hasan Yalnızoğlu as Stain
- Murat Kılıç as imam
- Yiğit Kirazcı as Yakup
- Tuğçe Karabacak as Özlem
- Tuncay Beyazıt as Turan
