= List of punk filmmakers =

List of filmmakers

The following is a list of film directors associated with making punk films:

- Abiola Abrams
- Gregg Araki
- Sadie Benning
- Lynn Breedlove
- Tammy Rae Carland
- Billy Childish
- Wolf Howard
- Alex Cox
- Vaginal Davis
- Vivienne Dick
- Wynne Greenwood
- Sogo Ishii
- Sarah Jacobson
- Derek Jarman
- G. B. Jones
- Miranda July
- Lech Kowalski
- Richard Kern
- Bruce LaBruce
- Don Letts
- Juliana Lueking
- Jackson Low
- Leslie Mah
- David Markey
- James Merendino
- Eric Mitchell
- John Cameron Mitchell
- Jon Moritsugu
- Amos Poe
- Jesse Richards
- Susan Seidelman
- Harris Smith
- Jean Smith
- Martin Sorrondeguy
- Penelope Spheeris
- James Spooner
- Julien Temple
- Lucy Thane
- Tõnu Trubetsky
- Nicholas Watson
- Brad Will
- Nick Zedd
- Mu Tunc
