= Come On My Son =

- Directed by: Bora Egemen
- Written by: Fırat Parlak
- Produced by: Faruk Turgut
- Starring: Kıvanç Tatlıtuğ; Alihan Türkdemir; Büşra Develi; Feridun Düzağaç
- Cinematography: Stefano Morcaldo
- Music by: Fahir Atakoğlu
- Production companies: Fox; 25 Film
- Distributed by: CGV Mars Dağıtım
- Release date: February 16, 2018
- Running time: 118 minutes
- Country: Turkey
- Language: Turkish

Come On My Son (Turkish: Hadi Be Oğlum) is a 2018 Turkish drama film, directed by Bora Egemen.

== Plot ==
Ali (played by Kıvanç Tatlıtuğ), a fisherman, devoted his life to his young son, Efe (played by Alihan Türkdemir). The film focuses on the relationship between single parent Ali and his son Efe. Efe is different from other children. A child with a communication disorder has trouble communicating with others. Efe has never spoken and has never looked at anyone in the eyes. Ali tries hard to reach out to his son and bond with him but no matter how hard he tries he is met with no response. Ali's greatest desire is to know that his son understands him.

== Cast ==
Actor	Role
Kıvanç Tatlıtuğ	Ali Kaptan
Alihan Türkdemir	Efe
Büşra Develi	Leyla
Feridun Düzağaç	Feridun
Yücel Erten	Haşmet
Yıldız Kültür	Güner
Sezai Aydın	Kamil
İlkay Akdağlı	Sertuğ
Cem Zeynel Kılıç	Murat
Durul Bazan	Mehmet
Nuri Gökaşan	
Ayşenur Yazıcı	
Cansın Özyosun	Nergis
Erdoğan Aydemir	Leyla'nın babası
Gizem Kala	Midye Yiyen Kız

== Awards ==
As the leading role in the film, Kıvanç Tatlıtuğ received the following awards:

- 2018: Istanbul Kültür University, Most Admired Movie Actor of the Year
- 2018: 2nd Bosphorus Awards, Best Actor
- 2019: 13th Galatasaray University The Best Awards, Best TV/Movie Actor of the Year
