= Furkan Andıç =

Turkish actor (born 1991)

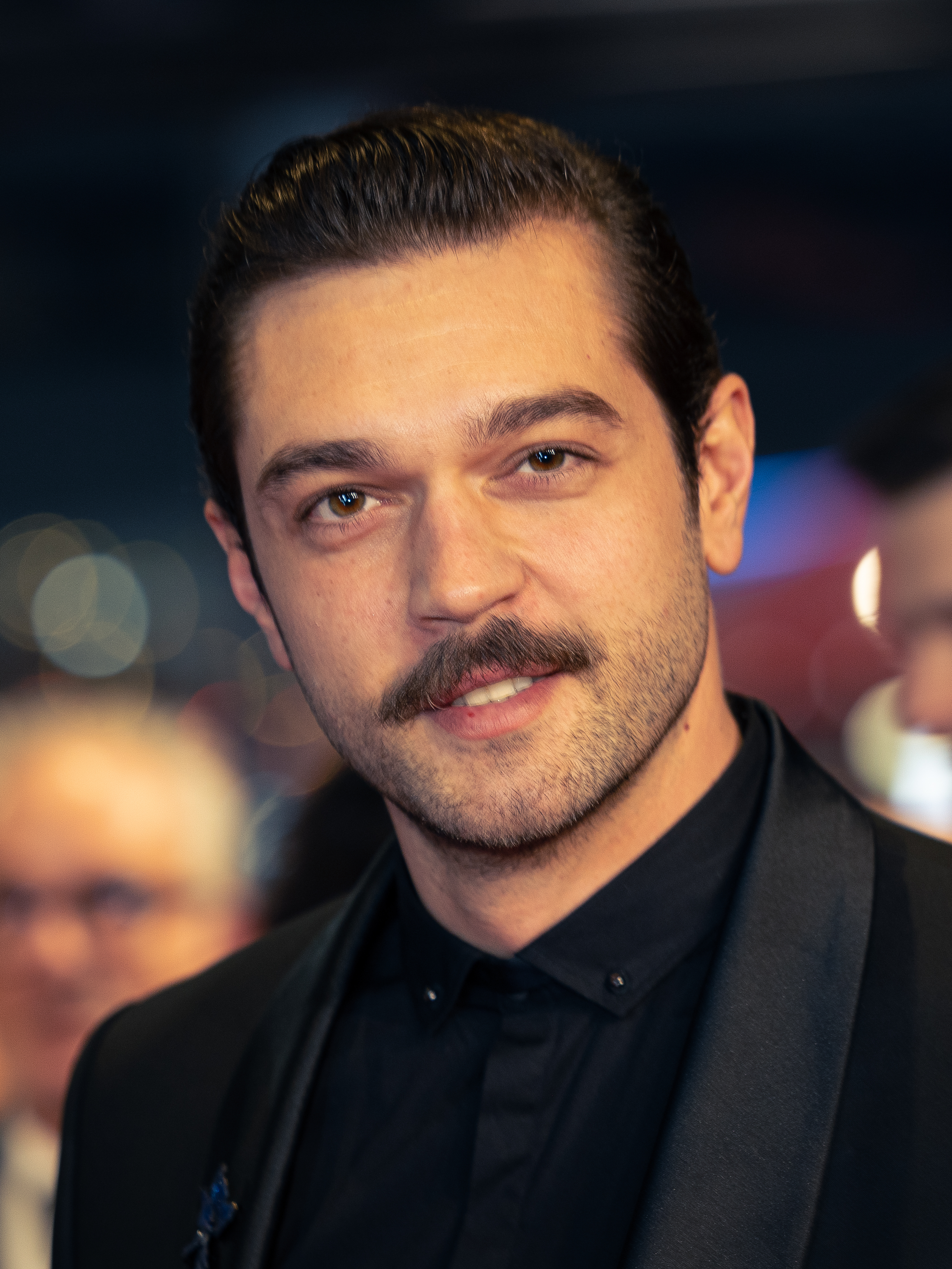
- Furkan Andıç in 2025
- Born: 4 April 1991 (age 35); Istanbul, Turkey
- Education: Yeditepe University
- Occupations: Actors and model
- Years active: 2011–present
- Height: 6 ft 3 in (191 cm)

Furkan Andıç (born 4 April 1990) is a Turkish actor and model, known for Kaçak Gelinler (2014–2015), Bir Kurabiye Masalı (2012), Kolej Günlüğü (2011), Tatlı İntikam (2016), Meryem (2017) and Her Yerde Sen (2019).

== Life ==
Andıç was born and raised in Istanbul, Turkey. His mother is of Bosnian descent while his father is from Trabzon, Turkey. He graduated from Yeditepe University in 2012. He's the middle son of his parents' three sons.

He began his television career with the TNT series Kolej Günlüğü (College Diary) alongside Burak Deniz. In August 2015, it was announced that he had been cast in the youth series Kırgın Çiçekler. He was cast Umutsuz Ev Kadınları adaptation of Desperate Housewives.

With Selin Şekerci, Açelya Topaloğlu, Deniz Baysal, he played together in Kaçak Gelinler for the second time. In 2016, he portrayed the character Sinan/Tankut on Kanal D's series Tatlı İntikam. In 2017, he was cast in a leading role in the TV series Meryem. In January 2018, he revealed that he was in a relationship with actress Dilan Çiçek Deniz. The two broke up in November 2018. In June 2019, he was cast in a leading role in the TV series Her Yerde Sen alongside Aybüke Pusat.

== Filmography ==
Web Series
Year	Title	Role	Notes
2023	Bozkır	Payidar	Leading role

Television
Year	Title	Role	Notes
2011	Kolej Günlüğü	Mert	Leading role
2011	Umutsuz Ev Kadınları	Levent	Recurring role
2012	Yağmurdan Kaçarken	Harun	Recurring role
2013	Aşk Ekmek Hayaller	Altan	Recurring role
2014−2015	Kaçak Gelinler	Selim İnan	Leading role
2015−2016	Kırgın Çiçekler	Gökhan Turalı	Recurring role
2016	Tatlı İntikam	Sinan Yılmaz	Leading role
2017	Meryem	Savaş Sargun	Leading role
2019	Kardeş Çocukları	Volkan Demir	Leading role
2019	Her Yerde Sen	Demir Erendil	Leading role
2020	Çatı Katı Aşk	Ateş Avcı	Leading role
2022	Kara Tahta	Atlas Kandemir	Leading role
2023–2024	Yıldızlar Bana Uzak	Kadir Erdem	Leading role
2026-	Şapkacı Kadınlar	Teğmen Salih	Leading role

Cinema
Year	Title	Role	Notes
2017	Damat Takımı	Ömer Sarıkaya	Leading role
2024	Cadi	Nasit Nefi Efendi	Leading role

Short film
Year	Title	Role	Notes
2012	Bir Kurabiye Masalı		
