= İksir =

2014 Turkish live action/animated film

- Film poster
- Written by: Murat Ferhat; Arzu Yurtseven
- Produced by: Birkan Uz
- Starring: Keremcem; Seda Güven
- Release date: May 16, 2014
- Running time: 77 minutes
- Country: Turkey
- Language: Turkish
- Budget: TRL 300,000 (estimated)

İksir (English: Elixir) is a 2014 Turkish live action/animated film, directed by Birkan Uz. The film went on nationwide general release on May 16, 2014.

== Plot ==
Kerem, who is now a young and extremely popular rock musician, grew up with his little sister, Buse, at his grandfather's farm after losing his parents. The grandpa, an extraordinary inventor, one day comes up with an elixir that enables humans to speak with animals and control their behavior. In order to prevent evil people from obtaining the formula, he keeps it a secret. However, Ökkeş, a boy from the same village who has a crush on Buse, knows about the elixir.

== Cast ==
- Sungun Bsbacan
- Yusuf Bedirhan
- Cansu Tosun
