= Dilan Çiçek Deniz =

Turkish actress and model (born 1995)

- Born: 28 February 1995 (age 31); Sivas, Turkey
- Education: American Academy of Dramatic Arts
- Occupations: Actress; model
- Years active: 2014–present
- Height: 1.77 m (5 ft 9.69 in)
- Beauty pageant titleholder
- Title: Miss Universe Turkey 2014
- Hair colour: Brown
- Eye colour: Brown
- Major competitions: Miss Universe Turkey 2014 (Winner); Miss Universe 2014 (Unplaced)

Dilan Çiçek Deniz (born 28 February 1995) is a Turkish actress, model and beauty pageant titleholder who was crowned Miss Universe Turkey 2014 and represented her country at the Miss Universe 2014 pageant.

== Life and career ==
She was born in 1995 in Sivas. Her parents are teachers. Her mother is Hale Temizyürek and her father is Orhan Deniz. She got three years of theater education at her high school. At the age of 15 she wrote a poetry book titled Güneşi Annem Sanırdım (lit. I thought the Sun was my mother) in Turkish. When she was 17, she joined a theater competition in her school and won an acting prize. She started with a tourism major at Ege University but soon changed her major to literature.

Dilan participated in 2014 Elidor Miss Turkey beauty competition and won second place. In the 2015 Miss universe pageant that took place in Miami she represented Turkey. In 2015 she acted as 'Ebru' in youth series "Tatlı Küçük Yalancılar" which adaptation of Pretty Little Liars. In that TV show she joined Bensu Soral, Şükrü Özyıldız, Alperen Duymaz, Beste Kökdemir, Büşra Develi, and Burak Deniz.

In 2015 she also acted as 'Elif' in youth series Güneşin Kızları TV show with Hande Erçel and Tolga Sarıtaş. From August 2016 to June 2017 she played a leading role in the youth series Bodrum Masalı alongside Alperen Duymaz. In 2016 she was awarded with the shining star award at the Golden Butterfly Awards. In 2018 she appeared in a lipstick commercial for Avon Products.

From 2017 to 2019 she had one of the leading roles in the crime series Çukur, alongside Aras Bulut İynemli, Perihan Savaş, Erkan Kolçak Köstendil, Necip Memili, Alperen Duymaz and Rıza Kocaoğlu. In 2020, she was cast opposite Metin Akdülger in the movie Yarına Tek Bilet, which tells the story of two foreigners traveling from Ankara to İzmir.

In 2020, she starred as Elif Urazoğlu opposite Burak Deniz in the surreal series Yarım Kalan Aşklar. In the same year she was cast as one of the female leads Alev Alev alongside Demet Evgar and Hazar Ergüçlü, playing the character of Rüya Yıldırımlar.

== Pageantry ==
=== Miss Turkey 2014 ===
Dilan Cicek Deniz was crowned as Miss Universe Turkey.

Dilan Cicek Deniz competed at Miss Universe 2014 but got eliminated.

== Personal life ==
In January 2018, it was revealed that she was in a relationship with Turkish actor Furkan Andıç. The two broke up in November 2018.

She was in a relationship with Icelandic director Thor Saevarsson. On 10 December 2021, she revealed through her Instagram that they were engaged. In December 2023, she mentioned in one of her Instagram stories that she is happily single

== Filmography ==
TV series
Year	Title	Role	Notes
2014	Medcezir	Herself	Guest Appearance
2015	Tatlı Küçük Yalancılar	Ebru	Leading role
2015	Güneşin Kızları	Elif	Supporting role
2016−2017	Bodrum Masalı	Su Ergüven	Leading role
2017−2019; 2021	Çukur	Sena Koçovalı	Leading role
2020−2021	Alev Alev	Rüya Yıldırımlar	Leading role
2022	Kusursuz Kiracı	Manolya "Mona" Ünkap	Leading role
Web series
Year	Title	Role	Notes
2020	Yarım Kalan Aşklar	Elif Urazoğlu	Leading role
2025	Persona	Burcu Türkoğlu	Leading role
Movies and TV films
Year	Title	Role	Notes
2013	Balayı	Bahar	Leading role
2020	Yarına Tek Bilet	Leyla Kavak	Leading role
2022	Aniden	Şebnem	Leading role
2022	Kal	Defne	Leading role
2024	Aşk Mevsimi]	Şirin	Leading role

== Theatre ==
Theatre
Year	Title	Role	Notes
2022	Amadeus	Constanze Mozart	

Awards and achievements
Preceded by Berrin Keklikler	Miss Turkey; 2014	Succeeded by Aslı Melisa Uzun
