= Aslı Melisa Uzun =

Turkish model and beauty pageant

- Born: 11 November 1995 (age 30); Ankara, Turkey
- Height: 1.74 m (5 ft 9 in)
- Beauty pageant titleholder
- Title: Miss Turkey Universe 2015
- Hair color: Light Brown
- Eye color: Brown
- Major competitions: Miss Turkey 2015 (Winner for Miss Universe); Miss Universe 2015 (Unplaced)

Aslı Melisa Uzun (born 11 November 1995) is a Turkish actress, model and beauty pageant titleholder who was crowned Miss Universe Turkey 2015 and represented her country at the Miss Universe 2015 pageant.

== Personal life ==
As of 2015, Uzun was a law student at University of Cologne in Germany.

== Miss Turkey 2015 ==
On June 11, 2015, Uzun was crowned Miss Turkey Universe 2015 by the last winner, Dilan Çiçek Deniz of Istanbul in Istanbul, Turkey. While at the same pageant three other titles crowned Miss Turkey World, Miss Turkey International and Miss Turkey Supranational 2015. The twenty three contestants were fighting to get the crown during the pageant process.

== Miss Universe 2015 ==
As Miss Universe Turkey 2015, the second placed of Miss Turkey 2015 contest, Uzun competed at the Miss Universe 2015 pageant but did not place.

== Filmography ==
=== Television ===
Year	Title	Role	Notes
2016	Arkadaşlar İyidir	Seda Yılmaz	Main role
2018	Erkenci Kuş	Gamze	Supporting role
2020–2021	Verbotene Liebe – Next Generation	Bobbi Atakan	Main role
2020–2021	Akrep	Duru	Main role
2022–	Ben Bu Cihana Siğmazam	Melike Çınar	Supporting role

== General references ==
- "Melisa Uzun". missuniverse.com. IMG Universe.

Awards and achievements
Preceded by Dilan Çiçek Deniz	Miss Turkey; 2015	Succeeded by Tansu Sila Çakir
