= Tatlı İntikam =

- Genre: Romance; Drama; Comedy
- Written by: Pınar Ordu; İlker Arslan
- Directed by: Barış Erçetin
- Starring: Leyla Lydia Tuğutlu; Furkan Andıç; Zeyno Günenç
- Theme music composer: Güliz Ayla
- Country of origin: Turkey
- Original language: Turkish
- No. of seasons: 1
- No. of episodes: 30

Production
- Producer: Ebru Sakal
- Production location: Istanbul
- Running time: 120 minutes
- Production company: D Productions

Original release
- Network: Kanal D
- Release: 26 March – 12 November 2016

Tatlı İntikam (transl. Sweet Revenge) is a Turkish television series broadcast on Kanal D. It is produced by D Productions, directed by Barış Erçetin and written by Pınar Ordu and İlker Arslan. It's the story of two people who were together in college. Sinan (Furkan Andıç) has fallen in love with Pelin (Leyla Lydia Tugutlu) but Pelin rejected his feelings and insulted him in front of all. They two meet each other again after many years. Pelin asks Sinan for help to change her fate and the situation brings them together. Pelin and Sinan both are in love, but faces many consequences.

== Summary ==
Convinced that her misfortunes in her love life are the karma brought to her by the way she behaved towards her college friend in the past, Pelin Soylu (Leyla Lydia Tuğutlu) tries to get forgiveness from Tankut Sinan Yılmaz (Furkan Andıç). Sinan, whose life changed due to Pelin, decides to get his own sweet revenge on her.

== Plot ==
Pelin Soylu (Leyla Lydia Tuğutlu), who had nothing but bad luck when it comes to her love life, finally has broken the curse. She is about to marry Tolga who is the man of her dreams but something unexpected happens as Tolga runs away from the wedding, leaving Pelin heartbroken. Pelin is comforted by her friends, as she is confronted by a woman who tells her that she is cursed by someone from her past and this is why she is so unlucky in love.

Pelin starts to questions her pasts along with her friends. Pelin suddenly remembers of Tankut Sinan Yılmaz (Furkan Andiç), who was in love with her while they both were attending the university. It is revealed that Sinan loved Pelin, but she rejected his feelings and insulted him in front of all. This left Sinan heart-broken and he quits his studies and left the university.

In the present day, Pelin tries to search for Sinan everywhere but she is unable to find him. Later, she goes to a restaurant's opening ceremony and there she finds a completely changed Sinan who is no longer the same person whom Pelin had known in the university. He is revealed to be the owner of the restaurant. Pelin tries to ask forgiveness from Sinan but he finds out that she is doing only this for her lovelife and is not ready to forgive her. Pelin realizes that Sinan will not forgive her that easily and she is ready to do whatever he asked of her. Sinan has every intention of making Pelin beg, so he starts his game of revenge. But things do not go very well for the two of them.

== Cast ==
Role	Actor
Pelin Soylu	Leyla Lydia Tuğutlu
Tankut Sinan Yılmaz	Furkan Andıç
Barış	İlker Kızmaz
Süheyla Soylu	Zeyno Günenç
Rıza Soylu	Kerem Atabeyoğlu
Meliha Yılmaz	Ayşenil Şamlıoğlu
Bülent	Çağrı Çitanak
Başak	Hazal Türesan
Simay	Cemre Gümeli
Ceyda	Seren Deniz Yalçın
Necip Uysal	Bülent Seyran
Havva Uysal	Elif Çakman
Rüzgar	Büşra Develi
Tolga	Can Nergis
Serkan	Barış Gönenen
Hakan	Emre Taşkıran

== International broadcasts ==
- Pakistan | On Urdu 1 as Ek Haseen Inteqam (اِک حسین انتقام)
- Albania | On Tring TV as Hakmarrje e ëmbël
- North Macedonia | On Alsat as Hakmarrje e ëmbël (Albanian)
- Italy | On Fox Life as Sweet Revenge
- South Africa | On e.tv as Soete Wraak
- Portugal | On SIC Caras as Sweet Revenge
