= İki Yabancı =

- Directed by: Halit Refiğ
- Starring: Hakan Ural, Brıgıtte Braun, and Kuzey Vargın
- Release date: 1990
- Country: Turkey
- Language: Turkish

İki Yabancı is a 1990 Turkish drama film, directed by Halit Refiğ and starring Hakan Ural, Brıgıtte Braun, and Kuzey Vargın.
