= Yarım Kalan Aşklar =

Turkish internet action and fantasy series

- Promotional poster
- Genre: Action, fantasy
- Written by: Ethem Özışık; Hakan Bonomo; Ercan Ugur
- Directed by: Umur Turagay
- Starring: Burak Deniz; Dilan Çiçek Deniz; Cem Davran; Ezel Akay
- Country of origin: Turkey
- Original language: Turkish
- No. of seasons: 1
- No. of episodes: 8

Original release
- Network: BluTV
- Release: 10 September – 29 October 2020

Yarım Kalan Aşklar (English: Unfinished Love Circle) is an action and fantasy Turkish internet series by BluTV and Tims & B Productions starring Burak Deniz and Dilan Çiçek Deniz. The series was released on September 10, 2020. It is directed by Umur Turagay and written by Ethem Özışık, Hakan Bonomo and Ercan Uğur.

== Plot ==
Journalist Ozan is about to marry the beautiful Elif who is a journalist like himself. Ozan, who is fond of investigative journalism, pursues mysterious and difficult news. His happy life with Elif ends after a terrible event: Ozan loses his life after being hit by a car. However, he finds himself resurrected in a new body again. Returning to life with another body, Ozan has two challenging tasks: to find out who killed him and to tell Elif all the facts.

== Notes ==
The role was previously offered to Hande Erçel, who was supposed to play instead of Dilan Çiçek Deniz but because of her on going series Sen Çal Kapımı she couldn't take a part. And the role of Nejat Amir was supposed to be played by Ali Atay but later he also gave up.

== Cast ==
- Burak Deniz as Mehmet Kadir Bilmez/Ozan
- Dilan Çiçek Deniz as Elif Urazoğlu
- Cem Davran as Nejat Amir
- Ezel Akay as Ayı İsmet
- Tolga Sarıtaş as Ozan
- Esra Ruşan as Saadet
- Nazlı Bulum as Ebru
- Muhammad Abdullah as Ehsan
- Cihat Süvarioğlu as Mehmet
- Gizem Ünsal as Ece
