= Muazzez Tahsin Berkand =

Turkish writer

Meryem Muazzez Tahsin Berkand
- Born: Meryem Muazzez Tahsin c. 1899; Thessaloniki, Ottoman Empire
- Died: 4 October 1984 (aged 84–85); Istanbul, Turkey
- Education: Soeurs de l'Assomption
- Occupation: Novelist

Meryem Muazzez Tahsin (c. 1899 – 4 October 1984) was a Turkish female writer. After the Surname Law in 1934, she assumed the surname Berkand.

== Life ==
She was born to Hasan Tahsin and his wife Ayşe in Thessaloniki, Greece, then a part of the Ottoman Empire. There is no consensus on her birth year as 1894 or 1900. According to Writers of Turkey she was born in 1899. The family left Thessaloniki after the Balkan Wars, and emigrated to Constantinople, Ottoman Empire in 1912. In Constantinople, she learned English and French by private lessons, and studied at the French missionary school of Soeurs de l'Assomption in Istanbul.

In 1917, she went to Beirut, Lebanon, then under the Ottoman rule, to serve as a teacher of Turkish language in the Beirut High School for Girls, which was founded by Halide Edip. After the Turkish War of Independence in 1922, she returned to Istanbul to serve a few years in the Şişli Terakki High School as a teacher of French and Ethics. Between 1925 and 1929, she worked for the "National Automobile Company" as a translator, and secretary. Berkand entered then the Ottoman Bank as a translator. She served 25 years in the Department of Legal Affairs of the bank.

She never married. Berkand died in Istanbul on 4 October 1984.

== Works ==
Her books (excluding the adaptations and the story book) are the following.

- 1933: Sen ve Ben ("You and Me")
- 1935: Bahar Çiçeği ("Spring Flower")
- 1935: Sonsuz Gece ("The Endless Night")
- 1938: Bir Genç Kızın Romanı ("The Novel of a Girl")
- 1941: Kezban
- 1943: Kızım ve Aşkım ("My daughter and my Love")
- 1944: Saadet Güneşi ("The Sun of Happiness")
- 1945: Lâle ("Tulip")
- 1948: Büyük Yalan (The Big Lie)
- 1949: O ve Kızı ( "She and Her Daughter")
- 1953: Sevmek Korkusu ("Fear of Love")
- 1957: Kırılan Ümitler (" Destroyed Hopes")
- 1958: Rüya Gibi ( "Like a Dream")
- 1960: Yılların Ardından ("After the Years")
- 1963: Gençlik Rüzgârı ("Wind of Youth")
- 1967: İlk Aşk ("First Love")
- 1972: Bir Gün Sabah Olacak mı ("Will the Sun Rise One Day?")
- 1972: İki Kalp Arasında ("Between Two Hearts")
- 1974: Uğur Böceği ("Ladybug")
- 1980: Yabancı Adam ("Strange Man")
