= Selim Bayraktar =

Iraqi-Turkman actor

- Born: 17 June 1975 (age 51); Kirkuk, Iraq
- Occupation: Actor
- Years active: 2006–present
- Spouse: Emel Karaköse (m. 2023)

Selim Bayraktar (born 17 June 1975) is an Iraqi-Turkish actor best known for his role as "Sümbül Ağa" in Muhteşem Yüzyıl. He received international recognition with his role in the Netflix original series Rise of Empires: Ottoman.

He is of Iraqi Turkmen background, from the city of Kirkuk.

== Life and career ==
Bayraktar was born in Kirkuk, Iraq, in 1975, to Iraqi Turkmen parents. As a child he began performing in gymnastic competitions. During the final days of the Iran–Iraq War, a body double of Saddam Hussein visited Bayraktar's school in order to recruit boys into the army; when Bayraktar was chosen to serve in the army his family decided to smuggle him into Turkey. He started working at the Turkish State Theatre after graduating from Hacettepe University in 2000.

Bayraktar speaks Turkish, Ottoman Turkish, Arabic, Kurdish, and English.

== Filmography ==
Cinema
Year	Title	Role	Notes
2009	Büyük Oyun	Smuggler	
2013	Romantik Komedi 2: Bekarlığa Veda		
2014	Kırmızı	Gökhan	
2015	Aşk Sana Benzer	Aykut	
2016	Vezir Parmağı	Ekmelettin	
2017	Cingöz Recai: Bir Efsanenin Dönüşü	Adil	
2017	Istanbul Kirmizisi	Ömer	
2018	Sevgili Komşum	Cengiz	
2018	Arada	Resul	
2022	Soygun Oyunu: Büyük Vurgun	Yücel Soykan	
2022	Heartsong	Kalender	

Television
Year	Title	Role	Notes
2006	Köprü	Erdal	TV series
2006	Bir Bulut Olsam	Mahmud Paşa	TV series
2011–14	Muhteşem Yüzyıl	Sümbül Ağa	TV series
2016	Gecenin Kraliçesi	Hakan Tasci	TV series
2017	Çoban Yıldızı	Zekkar Karakaya	TV series
2017	Görünen Adam	Eşref Şerif	TV series
2017–18	Ufak Tefek Cinayetler	Edip	TV series
2018	Ağlama Anne	Ali Osman	TV series
2019	Succession	Zeynal (guest)	TV series
2020	Rise of Empires: Ottoman	Çandarlı Halil Pasha	Web series
2020–21	Zümrüdüanka	Abbas	TV series
2021	Vahşi Şeyler	Bora	TV series
2021–2022	Destan	Alpagu Khan	TV series
2023	Veda Mektubu	Ziya Karlı	TV series
2024–2025	Mehmed: Fetihler Sultanı	Çandarlı Halil Pasha	TV series
