= Ceren Moray =

Turkish actress (born 1985)

- Born: 5 June 1985 (age 41); Diyarbakır, Turkey
- Education: Haliç University
- Occupations: Actress, comedian
- Spouse(s): Nicco Brun (m. 2017; div. 2022) Doğu Orcan (m. 2025)

Ceren Moray (born 5 June 1985) is a Turkish actress and comedian known for her roles in the TV series Kavak Yelleri (remake of Dawson's Creek), hit comedy series İşler Güçler, the drama Avlu, and O Hayat Benim.

== Life and career ==
Moray was born in 1985 in Diyarbakır as an only child of her family. Her father is from Diyarbakır and her mother is from Kastamonu. Her paternal family is of Kurdish origin, and her parents were civil servants. A few years after her birth, Moray and her family moved to Istanbul, where she received theatrical education at her earlier ages. After training at Pera Fine Arts High School, she got into the Haliç University in 2005 and graduated from the university in 2009.

Moray was married to Nicco Brun, a French citizen, between 2017 and 2022.

== Filmography ==
Film
Year	Name	Role	Notes
2014	Bi Küçük Eylül Meselesi	Berrak	Supporting role
2015	Yok Artık!	Ebru	Supporting role
2016	Olaylar Olaylar	Merve	Supporting role
2016	El Değmemiş Aşk	Feryal	Lead role
2018	Arada	Ezgi	Supporting role
Streaming series
Year	Name	Role	Notes
2021	Olağan Şüpheliler	Nehir Akçit	Lead role
Television
Year	Name	Role	Notes
2003	Serseri Aşıklar		Supporting role
2004	Dayı	Simge	Supporting role
2005	Nefes Nefese	Ezgi	Lead role
2007–2008	Doktorlar	Senem	Supporting role
2007–2010	Kavak Yelleri	Sultan / Su	Supporting role
2012–2013	İşler Güçler	Zehra Cengiz	Supporting role
2014–2017	O Hayat Benim	Efsun Demirci Atahan	Lead role
2018–2019	Avlu	Azra Kaya	Lead role
2020	Öğretmen	Zeynep	Lead role
2021	Yalancılar ve Mumları	Elif Usman	Lead role
2023–2024	Kirli Sepeti	Hayriye Sisman	Lead role
2026	Uzak Şehir	Meryem Gündüz	Supporting role
2026	Tuzlu Kahve	Aybüke Destan	Supporting role
