= Zeynep Tufekci =

Turkish sociologist and writer

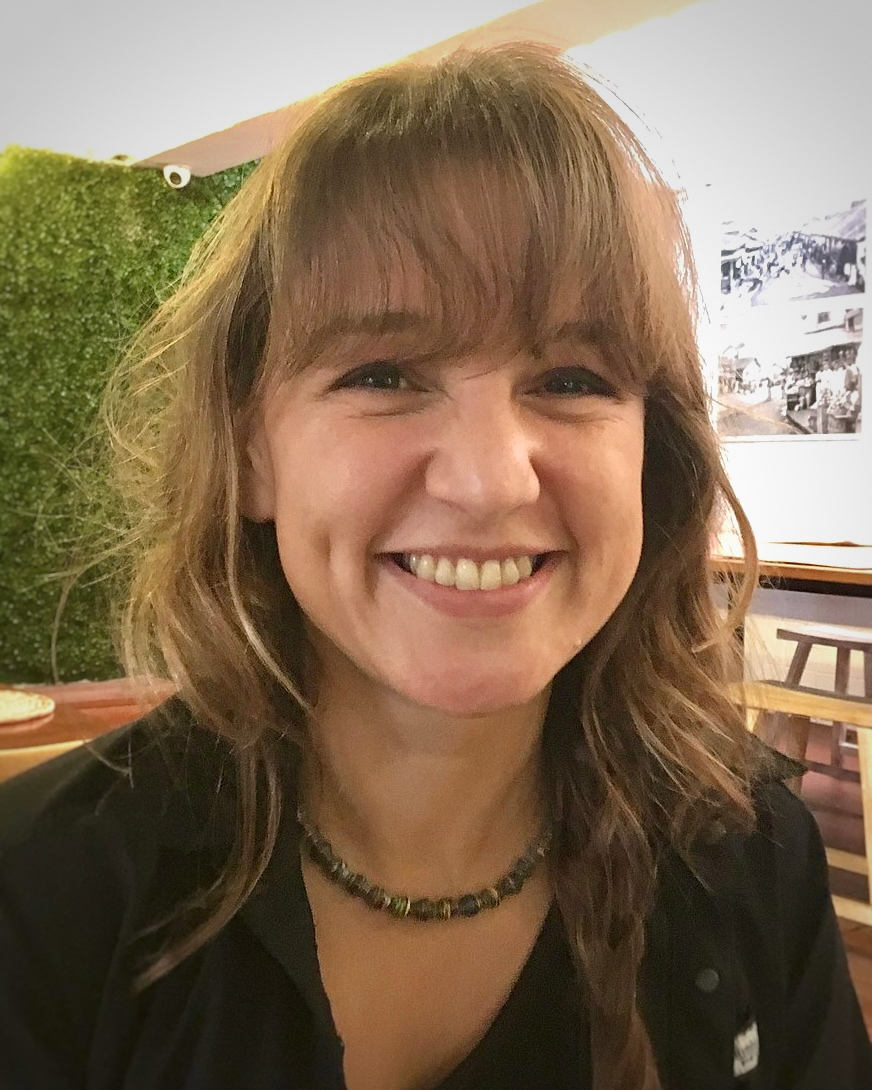
- Tufekci in 2019
- Born: Istanbul, Turkey
- Occupations: Sociologist; Writer
- Years active: 1999–present
- Title: Professor

Academic background
- Education: Istanbul University; Boğaziçi University; University of Texas at Austin

Academic work
- Discipline: Sociologist
- Sub-discipline: Complex Systems; Science and Technology
- Institutions: University of Maryland Baltimore County; Princeton University; Columbia University; University of North Carolina at Chapel Hill; The New York Times; The Atlantic
- Website: www.theinsight.org

Zeynep Tufekci (Turkish: Zeynep Tüfekçi; [zejˈnep tyfec'tʃi]; zay-NEP tuu-FEK-chee) is a Turkish-American sociologist, and the Henry G. Bryant Professor of Sociology and Public Affairs at Princeton University. She is also a columnist for The New York Times. Her work focuses on social media, media ethics, the social implications of new technologies, such as artificial intelligence and big data, as well as societal challenges such as the COVID-19 pandemic using complex and systems-based thinking. According to The Chronicle of Higher Education, she is one of the most prominent academic voices on social media and the new public sphere. In 2022, Tufekci was a Pulitzer Prize finalist for her "insightful, often prescient, columns on the pandemic and American culture", which the committee said "brought clarity to the shifting official guidance and compelled us towards greater compassion and informed response."

Before becoming a regular columnist, she was a frequent contributor to The New York Times and The Atlantic. She has also written columns for Wired and Scientific American. Prior to Princeton, she was a professor at Columbia University's Craig Newmark Center for Journalism Ethics and Security, a faculty associate at the Berkman Klein Center for Internet and Society at Harvard University, and an associate professor at the School of Information and Library Science at the University of North Carolina and associate professor at the University of Maryland Baltimore County.

== Early life and education ==
Tufekci was born in Istanbul, Turkey, near Taksim Gezi Park in Istanbul's Beyoğlu district. In 1995, Tufekci received a B.A. in sociology from Istanbul University, as well as an undergraduate degree in computer programming from Boğaziçi University. Tufekci earned an M.A. and a Ph.D. from the University of Texas at Austin.

== Career ==
Tufekci worked as a computer programmer before becoming an academic and turning her attention to social science.

Tufekci was a Visiting assistant professor at the Department of Sociology and Anthropology at the University of Maryland Baltimore County from 2005 to 2008 and assistant professor from 2008 to 2011.

In 2012, Tufekci became a faculty associate at the Berkman Klein Center for Internet & Society at Harvard University. During this time, Tufekci expressed concern about political campaigns impacted by and driven by big data in the form of "Smart Campaigns". This early warning was eventually recognized as prescient after Donald Trump was elected in 2016. At this time, Tufekci also focused on explaining social contagion and mass shootings and its direct relation to social media. She has repeatedly urged both online and in op-eds that outlets should avoid repetition of the killer's name and face as well as step-by-step discussions of their methods. The phenomenon of suicide contagion via social media and news coverage is part of Tufekci's analytical work.

In 2016, Tufekci was featured in a special report by The Economist on technology and politics in which she argues that the increasingly individualized targeting of voters by political campaigns is leading to a reduction of the "public sphere" in which civic debate takes place publicly. In May 2017, Tufekci's first book, Twitter and Tear Gas: The Power and Fragility of Networked Protest, was published by Yale University Press.

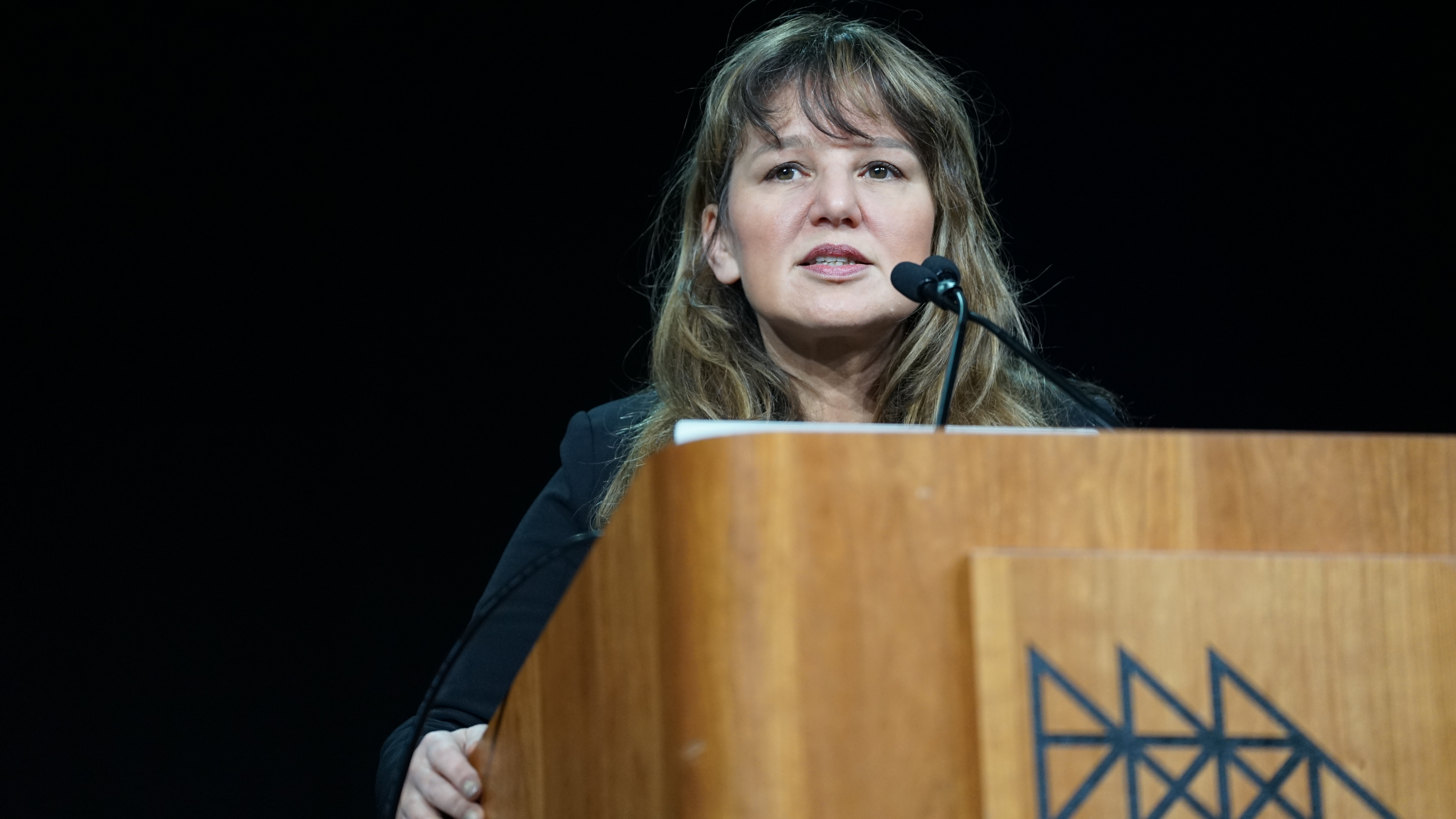
Tufekci in 2025

In 2020 during the COVID-19 pandemic, Tufekci was critical of the mainstream media for failing to explain the importance of mask wearing, and is often cited as one of the first to take up the importance of mask wearing in the mainstream media. This led to Tufekci becoming one of the academics who advised the WHO on adopting a mask recommendation. In addition to her mainstream media writing during the COVID-19 pandemic, Tufekci has co-authored articles published in peer-reviewed academic journals reviewing evidence that the SARS-CoV-2 virus is airborne, with British medical professor Trisha Greenhalgh and environmental engineering professor Linsey Marr.

Tufekci has given a series of TED talks on online social change, technology, the role of artificial intelligence and machine learning, and the role of social media and tech companies. She has also been a regular contributor at Wired.

== Honors and awards ==
- 2005: International Communication Association, Top Eight Papers in Communication and Technology for "Digital Divide and Social Mobility: How Much Hope and How Much Hype?"
- 2011-2012: The Berkman Klein Center for Internet & Society at Harvard University, Fellow
- 2012-2013: Princeton University, Center for Information Technology Policy, Fellow
- 2014: Business Insider, The 100 Most Influential Tech People On Twitter
- 2014: American Sociological Association, The Section on Communication, Information Technologies, and Media Sociology's Award for Public Sociology
- 2015-2016: Carnegie Corporation of New York, Andrew Carnegie Fellow in the Social Sciences and Humanities
- 2022: Honorary Doctor of Humane Letters degree, Brown University

== Works ==
=== Books ===
- Tufekci, Zeynep (2017). Twitter and Tear Gas: The Power and Fragility of Networked Protest. New Haven, Conn.: Yale University Press. ISBN 978-0-274-75665-0.

=== Theses ===
- Tufekcioglu, Zeynep S (1999). Mental Deskilling in the Age of the Smart Machine (M.A.). University of Texas at Austin, Department of Radio-Television-Film.
- Tufekci, Zeynep (2004). In Search of Lost Jobs: The Rhetoric and Practice of Computer Skills Training (Ph.D.). University of Texas at Austin.

=== Critical studies and reviews of Tufekci's work ===
Twitter and tear gas

- Heller, Nathan (August 21, 2017). "Out of Action: Do Protests Work?". The Critics. A Critic at Large. The New Yorker. Vol. 93, no. 24. pp. 70–77.
