= Arada (film) =

2018 Turkish film

- Directed by: Mu Tunç
- Written by: Mu Tunç; Sam Pink
- Produced by: Hasan Çobanoğlu
- Starring: Burak Deniz; Büşra Develi; Eriş Akman; Deniz Celiloğlu; Selim Bayraktar; Ceren Moray; Seda Akman; Yüksel Ünal
- Cinematography: Utku Sönmezer
- Edited by: Ahmet Teke
- Music by: Orkun Tunç
- Distributed by: CGV Mars Distribution
- Release date: April 13, 2018
- Running time: 109 min
- Country: Turkey
- Language: Turkish

Arada is a 2018 Turkish teen drama film written and directed by Mu Tunç in his feature film debut. The film tells the story of a young punk kid who wants to leave Istanbul in pursuit of a successful music career in California. The movie is depicting the underground life and punk music scene in Istanbul during 1990's. The film stars Burak Deniz, Büşra Develi, Ceren Moray, Deniz Celiloğlu, Selim Bayraktar and Seda Akman. It was released nationwide on 13 April 2018, in 81 theaters and has premiered in international film festivals and museums. Arada considered as one of the first punk film of Turkey.

== Synopsis ==
In 90's tumultuous Istanbul, Ozan is a young punk rocker who dreams of releasing a record in California. His father, Altan, is a former musician whose career was ended by a coup attempt. On the day of Ozan's birthday, they get into a heated argument about Ozan's future. Ozan leaves home to meet with his friend Deniz who tells him about a cruise ticket to California the next morning. Ozan and his girlfriend Lara set out through the city to house parties and underground rave party at a junkyard, to shisha bar on the search for the ticket.

== Cast ==
- Burak Deniz - Ozan
- Büşra Develi - Lara
- Eriş Akman - Altan
- Deniz Celiloğlu - Bülent
- Selim Bayraktar - Resul
- Ceren Moray - Ezgi
- Seda Akman - Party Girl
- Yüksel Ünal - Pirate
- Cem Başeksioğlu - Grandma
- Mu Tunç as Recorder Man

== Production ==
Mu Tunç's script was inspired by his childhood memories which his brother was one of the founding member of the pioneer punk bands in Istanbul. Many aspects of the film mirrored 1990's underground life in Istanbul and offers a look into a subculture that was largely unknown in Turkey and worldwide.

== Accolades ==
- Cinedays Skopje Film Festival: Winner Young Cinema Award (2018)
- SIYAD Turkish Film Critics Association Award: Winner Best Original Music (2018)
- International Izmir Film Festival: Winner Special Award (2019)
- Rome Independent Film Festival: Nominee RIFF Jury Award for Best Film (2018)
- !f 17th Istanbul Independent Film Festival: Nominee !f New Audience Award (2018)

== See also ==
- List of punk films
- List of punk filmmakers
- Cinema of Turkey
- List of Turkish films of 2018
