= Deniz Celiloğlu =

Turkish actor

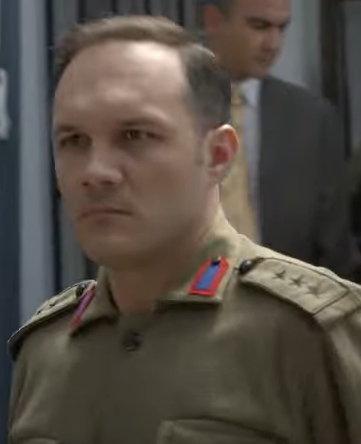
- Born: July 19, 1986 (age 40); Razgrad, Bulgaria
- Occupation: Actor
- Years active: 1999–present
- Spouse: Müge Bayramoğlu (m. 2010; div. 2013)
- Awards: Kerim Yılmazer Youth Talent Award

Deniz Celiloğlu (born 19 July 1986) is a Turkish actor.

== Early life and career ==
Deniz Celiloğlu was born on 19 July 1986 in Razgrad, Bulgaria into a Bulgarian Turk family and moved with his family to Turkey at the age of 3. A graduate of Mimar Sinan University, Faculty of State Conservatory, Theater Department, Deniz Celiloğlu took part in many plays. He became known for his role as Commissioner Selim in the Kanal D series Kanıt. He also had leading roles in the movies Ev and Tamam mıyız?. Deniz Celiloğlu married Müge Bayramoğlu on 12 December 2010. The couple divorced after 3 years of marriage.

== Filmography ==
=== Film ===
Year	Title	Original title	Role	Notes
2010	Ev	Ev	X	
2013	Are We OK?	Tamam Mıyız?	Temmuz	
2015	The Fish in Me	Icimdeki Balik	Barış	
2015	Student Affairs	Ögrenci Isleri	Bobinci Nuri	
2015	Ada	Ada	Efe	
2016	No Way 2	Yok Artik 2	Rifat Bey	
2017	Marlon	Marlon		
2018	In Between	Arada	Bülent	Netflix film
2018	Siren's Call	Son Çikis	Tahsin	
2019	Miracle in Cell No. 7	7. Koğuştaki Mucize	Yüzbaşı Faruk	
2021	Disonans	Disonans	Selim	Short film
2022	Sun, Moon and Woman	Sun, Moon and Woman	Lokman	Short film
2023	About Dry Grasses	Kuru Otlar Üstüne		
2024	Everyday It Gets a Little Easier			Short film

=== Television ===
Year	Title	Role	Notes
2010–12	Kanıt	Selim Dağdelen	Leading
2012	Muhteşem Yüzyıl	İsmail Şah	Supporting
2013	Çalıkuşu	Selim	Supporting
2014	Emanet	Halit Kozaklı	Supporting
2015	Gecenin Kraliçesi	Emre	Leading
2015–16	O Hayat Benim	Ömer Aziz	Supporting
2016-17	Poyraz Karayel	Savaş Biryol	Supporting
2017	Siyah Beyaz Aşk	Yiğit Aslan	Leading
2023	Derin Mor	Arif	Leading
