= O Hayat Benim =

Turkish drama television series

- Genre: Soap opera Drama; Crime; Romance
- Created by: Esin Gök
- Written by: Ahmet Saatçioğlu; Gül Abus Semerci; Ozer Çetinel; Yelda Eroğlu; Can Sinan; Ali Ercivan; Serdar Soydan; Yekta Torun; Mert Meriçli; Ekin Deren; Bekir Baran Sıtkı; Rana Mamatlıoğlu; Murat Emir Eren
- Directed by: Merve Girgin; Yıldız Hülya Bilban; Hamdi Alkan; Sadullah Şentürk; Ozan Uzunoğlu; Gülbin Aydın
- Starring: Ezgi Asaroğlu; Keremcem; Ceren Moray; Ozan Güler; Sinan Albayrak; Ahu Sungur; Cem Özer; Oya Başar
- Composer: Dizi Müzikleri
- Country of origin: Turkey
- Original language: Turkish
- No. of seasons: 4
- No. of episodes: 131

Production
- Producer: Yaşar İrvul
- Production location: Istanbul
- Running time: 110–170 minutes
- Production company: Pastel Film

Original release
- Network: FOX
- Release: February 14, 2014 – May 2, 2017

O Hayat Benim (English title: That is My Life) is a Turkish television drama originally broadcast on FOX from 2014 to 2017. The series follows Bahar who was snatched from her mother's arms (Hasret) at birth by her grandfather and is put to live with his servants until, many years later, the old man reveals her existence to her millionaire birth father (Mehmet). As her birth father comes to collect his daughter, Bahar's adoptive mother (Nuran) uses her biological daughter Efsun in her stead to gain wealth for her poor family. Halfway throughout the series, the lie is revealed, but problems deepen between the characters residing in the Mehmet estate and those whose lives revolve around them.

== Cast ==
- Ezgi Asaroğlu – Bahar Demirci/Atahan/German
- Keremcem – Ateş German
- Ceren Moray – Efsun Demirci/Atahan
- Ozan Güler – Arda Atahan
- Ayşenaz Atakol – Nuran Atahan/German
- Sinan Albayrak – Mehmet Emir Atahan
- Ahu Sungur – Hülya Atahan/Erksan/Gülsoy
- Cem Özer – Kenan Erksan
- Oya Başar – Sultan Erdemli
- Erdal Cindoruk – Salih Sarıkaya
- Nesime Alış – Adile
- Görkem Gönülşen – Beyza
- Bahar Şahin – Müge Atahan/Saydam
- Serkan Şenalp – Cemal Saydam
- Aybüke Pusat / Beril Kayar – Zeynep Koçak/Saydam/Erdemli
- Zerrin Sümer – Ganimet Koçak
- Ayça Damgacı – Muzaffer Koçak
- Selen Görgüzel – Cevriye Koçak
- Ecem Baltacı – Hanife Koçak
- Ayçin Inci – Zühal Karasu
- Makbule Meyzinoğlu – Figen
- Cahit Gök – Volkan Karasu
- Gökhan Mete – Pertev Karasu
- Yusuf Akgün – Orkun Baytan
- İncilay Şahin – Hamiyet Baytan
- Selen Seyven – Reyhan Kaygısız
- Ayumi Takano – Teya
- Kartal Balaban – Murat
- Hira Koyuncuoğlu – Nehir Erksan
- Kebire Tokur – Hayriye Saydam
- Ceyda Ateş – Cemre Atahan / Ayla
- Muhammed Kurtuluş Ayyıldız – Toprak
- Hülya Şen – Meryem / Cemre
- Süleyman Atanısev – İlyas Demirci
- Yeşim Ceren Bozoğlu – Nuran Demirci
- Didem İnselel – Fulya Atahan
- Turgay Aydın – Asım Gülsoy / Orhan
- Büşra Çubukçuoğlu – Hatice
- Şan Bingöl – Alp Toprak / Emrah
- Sezgi Mengi – Onur
- Nurşim Demir – Edibe Atahan / Ozlem
- Zeynep Eronat – Mücella Demirci
- Gülsen Tuncer – Semra
- Neslihan Acar – Süreyya / Seda
- Güzide Arslan – Seçil Çevik / Nadya
- Birgül Ulusoy – Sakine Çevik / Ebru
- Denizhan Caner – Sadik Erkiran
- Mehmet Vanlıoğlu – Yilmaz Erkiran
- Erol Aksoy – Yusuf Erkıran
- İclal Aydın – Hasret Erkıran
- Ercüment Fidan – Eyüp Saka
- Meriç Özkaya – Yıldıray Gencer
- Oguzhan Baran – Fethi Gürsoy
- Murat Cen – Murat
- Fuat Balyemez – Fuat
- Suat Köroğlu – Burhan
- Zafer Kalfa – Ediz Sümaz
- Abdullah Toprak – Alperen Güren
- Cem Kılıç – İsmail Demirkan / Kenan
- Deniz Celiloğlu – Ömer Aziz
- Barış Büktel – Cengiz / Turgay
- Murat Donbaz – Orhan / Mustafa
- Özgün Çoban – Toros Güney
- Larissa Gacemer – Arzu German / Vildan
- Egemen Samson – Doruk German
- Ahmet Yenilmez – Tayfun German
- Korhan Okay – Osman Erkıran
- Ezel Salık – Güleser Erkıran
- İrfan Çınar Var – Berat Erkıran
- Bülent Bilgiç – Kenan
- Zafer Altun – Hasan
- Umur Yiğit Vanlı – Berk
- Murat Soydan – Nedim
- Nihal Menzil – Refika
- Ayla Algan – Ayten
- Ergül Coşkun – Esma Gülsoy
- Derya Uçar – Arzu
- İrem Hatun Bora – Esma
- Ece Irtem – Sinem
- Okan Tokmak – Emre
- Reyhan İlhan – Reyhan Kartepe
- Ayhan Yıkgeç – Ayhan Kartepe
- Halil Kumova – Iskender Kartepe
- Vedi İzzi – Necati Kurşunoğlu
- Muhammed Cangören – Affan Mutallib
- Rana Cabbar – Macit
- Caner Yılmaz – Ferdi / Mehmet
- Volkan Alkan – Hayrettin
- Görkem Türkeş – Vural
- Gülten Çelik – Şükriye
- Alican Bayhan – Burak
- Pınar Aydın – Tülay
- Ali Savaşçı – Behçet Arakon
- Egemen Ertürk – Age Ardişçı
- Adnan Başar – Adat Saydam
- Umut Külen – Mert
- Umut Açabuğa – Şimuz
- Vural Ceylan – Seyfi
- Engin Özgör – Engin Çiki
- Ayşegül Kaygusuz – Denize Çiki
- Ece Baykal – Durdana
- Fatma Karabiber – Gulnaz
- Sezgin Uygun – Sezgin
- Ertan Güntav – Halim
- Cumhur Korkmaz – Metin
- Müge Kırgıç – Alcina
- Şener Savaş – Arkan
- Musa Çiçek – Ahmet Sağır
- Hamdi Alkan – Hamo
