= Engin Öztürk =

Turkish actor

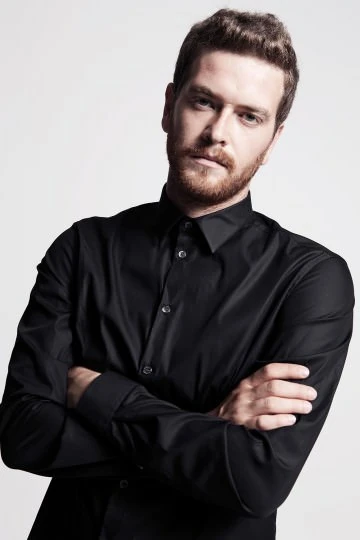
- Born: Ahmet Engin Öztürk; 28 September 1986 (age 39); Eskişehir, Turkey
- Education: Hacettepe University State Conservatory-Theater
- Occupation: Actor
- Years active: 2010–present

Ahmet Engin Öztürk (Turkish pronunciation: [æɲˈɟin ˈœstyɾc]; born 28 September 1986) is a Turkish actor.

== Early life ==
Öztürk was born on 28 September 1986 in Eskişehir. His family are descendants of Turkish immigrants displaced by Balkan conflicts and population exchanges who moved to Türkiye. His paternal side is of Turkish origin and emigrated from Bulgaria, while his maternal side consists of Ottoman Turks from Thessaloniki, which was then part of Rumelia, which is now Greece.

After graduating from Eskişehir Fatih Anatolian High School, Öztürk played volleyball for eight years. His father served in the Turkish army, and Öztürk initially followed in his footsteps by enrolling at the Izmir Air Astsubay Vocational High School, from which he graduated in 2005. However, he later decided to leave the military path and instead pursued a degree in theatre at Hacettepe University.

== Career ==
Öztürk left the TSK (Turkish Armed Forces) in 2006 due to incompatibility with military service. He then moved to Ankara and enrolled at the Hacettepe University State Conservatory, graduating from the Department of Theatre in 2012.

During his student years, he worked as a bartender at the bar owned by actor Erdal Beşikçioğlu. In 2010, Öztürk made his television debut as Selim Yaşaran in the popular series Fatmagül'ün Suçu Ne?. He went on to appear in the hit crime drama Behzat Ç. Bir Ankara Polisiyesi. In 2013, he portrayed Sultan Selim II in the historical drama series Muhteşem Yüzyıl. Although he did not act in the romantic dramas İffet and Bir Aşk Hikayesi, he contributed to the projects as their editor.

Öztürk is a popular actor. He is also recognized as a handsome Turkish actor, ranking seventh on various lists.

== Filmography ==
=== Film ===
Movie	Role	Year
Çanakkale Yolun Sonu	Mustafa Kemal Atatürk	2013
Biz Böyleyiz	Gökçe	2020

=== Web series ===
TV series	Role	Year	Notes
Behzat Ç. Bir Ankara Polisiyesi	Emre	2012–2013	Leading Role
Hakan: Muhafız	Levent	2019–2020	Leading Role
50M2	Gölge/Adem	2021	Leading Role

=== TV series ===
TV series	Role	Year	Notes
Fatmagül'ün Suçu Ne?	Selim Yaşaran	2010–2012	Leading Role
Muhteşem Yüzyıl	Şehzade Selim	2013–2014	Leading Role
Hayat Yolunda	Cem Korcan	2014–2015	Leading Role
Hatırla Gönül	Yusuf Özkara	2015	Leading Role
Yüksek Sosyete	Kerem Özkan	2016	Leading Role
Diriliş: Ertuğrul	Günalp Bey	2018	Leading Role
Yüzleşme	Ömer	2019	Leading Role
Doğduğun Ev Kaderindir	Barış Tunahan	2020–2021	Leading Role
Annenin Sırrıdır Çocuk	Sadun Kenan	2022	Leading Role
Sıfırıncı Gün	Özgür	2022	Leading Role
Sandık Kokusu	Bora Bozbeyli	2023–2025	Leading Role
