= Twitter and Tear Gas =

Non-fiction book

- Author: Zeynep Tufekci
- Cover artist: Mstyslav Chernov
- Language: English
- Subject: Protest, social media
- Genre: Non-fiction
- Publisher: Yale University Press
- Publication date: 2017
- Pages: 360
- ISBN: 978-0-300-21512-0
- Website: https://www.twitterandteargas.org/

Twitter and Tear Gas: The Power and Fragility of Networked Protest is a 2017 non-fiction book written by Zeynep Tufekci about protest in the age of the internet, social networks, and social media. Tufekci describes the internet as a new type of digital public sphere and compares protest movements throughout history to modern movements that used the internet. The book is freely available under a Creative Commons license.

== Overview ==
Tufekci stresses throughout that online spaces and social media are an important public sphere and not simply virtual extensions of people's lives. She asserts that pre- and post-internet movements cannot be judged by the same criteria. The internet has given protesters the power to gather and scale quickly: the 1963 March on Washington drew hundreds of thousands and was the result of many months of planning in a multi-year effort, while massive crowds during the Egyptian revolution of 2011 gathered in Tahrir Square in a few days. She describes a movement's "capacity" and its "signal". The capacity is its ability to (for example) command a narrative, to disrupt the status quo, or to effect legislative or structural change. Protests are a "signal" of such capacities. The Civil rights movement built such capacities and achieved significant change, while protests such as Occupy Wall Street gathered large crowds but fizzled. She describes "tactical freeze", in which movements are unable to respond to inevitable government countermeasures. Governments may also employ methods of censorship like manipulating attention by flooding social media with irrelevant or misleading information, as with China's 50 Cent Army, or pushing activists towards self-censorship through online harassment.

== Reception ==
Twitter and Tear Gas was named as one of 50 notable works of nonfiction by The Washington Post. A review from the newspaper praised the book for its transformative view of the role of digital technology in activist causes. Another review described the book as essential documentation of how social media plays a role in protests.
