= Mushfig Shahverdiyev =

Azerbaijani actor

- Born: Mushfig Shahverdiyev; September 12, 1983 (age 42); Lankaran, Azerbaijan
- Citizenship: USSR; Azerbaijan
- Occupations: Actor; comedian

Mushfig Shahverdiyev (Azerbaijani: Müşfiq Şahverdiyev) (12 September 1983, Lankaran) is an Azerbaijani actor, comedian and screenwriter. He began his career for the first time in 2007 with the film "Burnt Bridges". In 2011, he became popular with the comedy series "Bu da Bu".

== Life and career ==
Shahverdiyev Mushfig Faig was born in 1983 in Lankaran. He won an expensive car as the winner of the 11th "Revenge" speed of the reality show "Mashin".

"My name is Intikham" is the project manager and lead actor of the national comedy film. The comedy has been shown in cinemas since November 28, 2014. Since independence, Azerbaijan has gone down in history as the most watched film among local films.

== Filmography ==
1. Bu da bu (2011)
2. My name is Intiqam (2014)
3. Milyonluk Kuş (2018)
4. Yanmış körpüler (film, 2007)
5. Niye? (film, 2017)
6. Niye? 2 (film, 2017)
7. Ağ Tük
8. Miras (film, 2008)
9. My name is İntiqam (film, 2014)
10. Qayınanamız (Series, 2015)
11. My name is İntiqam 2: Moldova (film, 2015)
12. Gizlenpaç (film, 2016)
13. O başdannan (TV show, 2018)
