= Melisa Şenolsun =

Turkish actress

- Born: 24 September 1996 (age 29); İzmir, Turkey
- Occupation: Actress
- Years active: 2015–present

Melisa Şenolsun (born 24 September 1996) is a Turkish actress.

== Life and career ==
Melisa Şenolsun was born on 24 September 1996 in İzmir. Şenolsun is a graduate of İzmir Gelişim College Anatolian High School and studied at Istanbul University State Conservatory. Her older brother, Efecan Şenolsun, is also an actor. She became interested in acting at a young age and through watching her older sister on stage. At the age of 6 she started participating in theatre plays. Aside from acting, she took gymnastic and ballet lessons for years.

She made her television debut in 2015 with a role in the series Tatlı Küçük Yalancılar which adaptation of Pretty Little Liars and depicted the character of Hande. For a while, she worked at the Uğur Mumcu Bornova State Theatre. She was then cast in Kiralık Aşk, portraying the character of "Sude". She had her first leading role in the youth crime series Umuda Kelepçe Vurulmaz as "Ceren" opposite Mert Yazıcıoğlu. In 2018, she made her debut in the series Nefes Nefese and depicted the character of Rüya Kıran alongside Tatlı Küçük Yalancılar's co-star Şükrü Özyıldız.

Şenolsun had her first cinematic experience with the movie Babam, directed by Nihat Durak. Her breakthrough came with her role in the Netflix original series Atiye. In 2021, she starred in the series Masumlar Apartmanı and portrayed the character of Rüya, a delicate but reckless girl, who is thrown into dangers.

== Personal life ==
Şenolsun had been dating actor Ozan Dolunay for almost three and a half years by the time the couple broke up in 2019. Following the breakup, she started dating Umut Evirgen.

== Filmography ==
=== Film ===
Year	Title	Role	Director	Notes
2017	Babam	Feride	Nihat Durak	Leading role
2019	Güzelliğin Portresi	Hilal	Umur Turagay	Leading role
2021	Buluşma Noktası	Kimya	Umut Evirgen	Leading role
2022	LCV (Lütfen Cevap Veriniz)	Ceren	İsmet Kurtuluş, Kaan Arıcı	Leading role

=== Web series ===
Year	Title	Role	Director	Notes
2019–2021	Atiye	Cansu / Elif	Ozan Açıktan, Gönenç Uyanık, Ali Taner	Leading role

=== TV series ===
Year	Title	Role	Director	Notes
2015	Tatlı Küçük Yalancılar	Hande	Cem Karcı	Leading role
2015–2016	Kiralık Aşk	Sude İplikçi	Metin Balekoğlu (1–20); Barış Yöş (21–43)	Supporting role (season 1)
2016–2017	Umuda Kelepçe Vurulmaz	Ceren	Cemal Şan	Leading role
2018	Nefes Nefese	Rüya Kıran	Aydın Bulut	Leading role
2020	Menajerimi Ara	Herself	Ali Bilgin	Guest appearance (episode 4)
2021–2022	Masumlar Apartmanı	Rüya	Çiğdem Bozali	Leading role
