= Erkan Kolçak Köstendil =

Turkish actor and director (born 1983)

- Born: 16 January 1983 (age 43); Bursa, Turkey
- Education: Mimar Sinan Fine Arts University
- Occupations: Actor, director
- Years active: 2005–present
- Spouse: Cansu Tosun (m. 2018; div. 2026)
- Children: 1
- Relatives: Bülent Şakrak (uncle)
Association football career
- Position: Goalkeeper
Youth career
- 1996–1999: Bursaspor
Senior career*
Years	Team	Apps	(Gls)
1999–2001	Alacahirka Spor		
2016–2018	Küçükköyspor		
2018–2021	Vefa		
2021	Amsterdam Gençler Birliği		
- * Club domestic league appearances and goals

Erkan Kolçak Köstendil (born 16 January 1983) is a Turkish actor, director and former footballer. His family is of Turkish descent who immigrated from Kyustendil. His cousin is actor Bülent Şakrak. He married actress Cansu Tosun.

He started his career with roles in theater plays, films, and TV series, however, he eventually became known with his role in Ulan Istanbul and later in Çukur. His fantasy series are Görünen Adam and Yaratılan. He played supporting roles in hit series such as Yılan Hikayesi, Kurtlar Vadisi, Sakarya Fırat, Merhamet, and Muhteşem Yüzyıl: Kösem. He has won awards for his appearance in several short films.

== Life and career ==
Köstendil was born in 1983 in Bursa. He is a graduate of Bursa Atatürk High School. During his high school years, he was a member of the Bursaspor football team.

He began his acting career at the Tuncay Özinel Theater, by playing a number of roles in plays such as AuT and Karşı Cinsle Tanışma Sanatı.

In 2009, he wrote and directed the series Mukadderat, which was published online on Facebook. In the same year, he got a role in the action series M.A.T and portrayed the character of "Emre". In 2010, he wrote and directed the short movie Vakit, which received awards at the Sinepark 4th Short Film Festival, Eskişehir Kral Midas Short Film Festival, and the 47th International Antalya Film Festival.

He also wrote the scenario for the feature film Torbacının Esrarı, which was shot in Amsterdam and Istanbul. His fourth short film project was Suma, which was released in 2018 and realized as one of Turkey's good comedy works at the Los Angeles Film Awards.

== Theatre ==
- Kalp Düğümü – Craft Theater
- AuT – İkincikat Theater
- Karşı Cinsle Tanışma Sanatı – Isparta Virtual Theater
- 12 Numaralı Adam

== Filmography ==
=== Web series ===
Year	Title	Role	Notes
2017	Görünen Adam	Kurtuluş	
2023	Yaratılan	İhsan	

=== Television series ===
Year	Title	Role	Notes
2002	Yılan Hikayesi	Hamburger maker	Supporting role
2005	Kurtlar Vadisi	Memati's fellow	Supporting role
2009–2012	Sakarya Fırat	Er Mahmut Karakum	Supporting role
2012	Babalar ve Evlatlar	Ayhan	Supporting role
2013	Merhamet	Mehmet	Supporting role
2014–2015	Ulan İstanbul	Karlos Nevizade	Leading role
2015–2016	Muhteşem Yüzyıl: Kösem	Şahin Giray Han	Supporting role
2016	Familya	Toprak Beyoğlu	Leading role
2017	Bir Deli Sevda	Mehmet Gökdeniz	Leading role
2017–2021	Çukur	Vartolu Saadettin / Salih Koçovalı	Leading role
2019	Çarpışma	Vartolu Saadettin / Salih Koçovalı	Guest appearance
2023	Ne Gemiler Yaktım	Toprak	Leading role
2025-2026	Veliaht	Yahya Kaptan	Leading role

=== Film ===
Year	Title	Role	Notes
2008	Güz Sancısı	Demonstrator	Supporting role
2009	M.A.T	Emre	
2009	Melekler ve Kumarbazlar	Tea maker	Supporting role
2009	Mukadderat		
2014	İtirazım Var	Superman	Supporting role
2014	Yağmur: Kıyamet Çiçeği	Şenol	Leading role
2015	Yok Artık!	Taxi driver Fikret	Leading role
2015	Kara Bela	Güven	Leading role
2017	Babam	Deniz	Leading role
2017	Put Şeylere		Leading role
2018	Müslüm	Pavilion owner	Supporting role
2019	Sibel	Ali	Leading role
2019	Türk İşi Dondurma	Cameleer Ali	Leading role
2022	Gönül	Piroz	Leading role
2022	Bandırma Füze Kulübü	Necati	Leading role
2022	Tamirhane	İdris	Leading role
2025	The Things You Kill	Reza	Supporting role

== Discography ==
Singles

- 2018: "Nemrudun Kızı" (feat. Mustafa Kırantepe)
- 2020: "Doyana Doymayana Popkek III"
