= Büşra Develi =

Turkish actress

- Born: 25 August 1993 (age 32); İzmit, Turkey
- Occupations: Actress, model
- Years active: 2012–present
- Height: 1.80 m (5 ft 11 in)
- Website: www.busradeveli.com

Büsra Develi (born 25 August 1993) is a Turkish actress.

== Life and career ==
After completing her primary education, she moved to Antalya with her family and completed her secondary and high school education there. Later, she moved to Istanbul to study theater and acting, and by successfully passing the university entrance exams, she enrolled in the Theater department of Mimar Sinan University. She had a role in a music video for Enbe Orkestrası & İlyas Yalçıntaş's song.

In 2015, she portrayed the character of Selin in the series Tatlı Küçük Yalancılar which adaptation of Pretty Little Liars alongside her ex-boyfriend Burak Deniz. . She played the role of Rüzgar in Tatlı İntikam. She later had a leading role in the web series Fi based on novel. She played in historical series "Mehmed: Bir Cihan Fatihi".

In addition to her career in television, She played in popular films "Ayla", "Hadi Be Oğlum", "Karakomik Filmler 2: Deli". Develi was cast in a leading role in the movie Arada, directed by Mu Tunç.

== Personal life ==
She was in relationship with the famous actor, Burak Deniz, from 2015 to 2018.

The breakup was due to irreconcilable differences between Büşra Develi and Burak Deniz.

== Filmography ==
=== Film ===
Year	Title	Role	Notes
2017	Ayla	Nimet	Supporting role
2017	Bitmiş Aşklar Müzesi	Ada	Short film - leading role
2018	Hadi Be Oğlum	Leyla	Leading role
2018	Arada	Lara	Leading role
2020	Karakomik Filmler 2: Deli	Meral	Leading role

=== Web series ===
Year	Title	Role	Notes
2017–2018	Fi	Kara Bilge	Leading role
2022	Erkek Severse	Zeynep Uysal	Leading role
2025	Kasaba	Begüm	Leading role

=== Television ===
Year	Title	Role	Notes
2015	Tatlı Küçük Yalancılar	Selin	Leading role
2016	Tatlı İntikam	Rüzgar	Supporting role
2018	Mehmed: Bir Cihan Fatihi	Eleni	Leading role
2021	Akıncı	Nergis	Leading role
2025–	Eşref Rüya	Çiğdem Serim	Leading role
