= G20 World Brain Mapping & Therapeutic Scientific Summit =

International research initiative

The G20 World Brain Mapping & Therapeutic Scientific Summit aims to contribute to former President of the United States Barack Obama's BRAIN initiative and to expand action on the current and upcoming initiatives across the G20 nations, bringing the finest scientists, engineers, physicians and surgeons across the globe in order to rapidly introduce clinical solutions for neurological disorders, which cost the world economy hundreds of billions of dollars annually. G20 World Brain Mapping Summit was launched in 2014 on the initiative of The Society for Brain Mapping and Therapeutics (SBMT).

== History ==
=== First Annual G20 World Brain Mapping Summit 2014 ===
Amen Clinics, Compumedics Inc, SBMT, and BMF held the first annual summit on G20 World Brain Mapping and Therapeutics Initiative in Brisbane, Australia on 13 November in Mercure Hotel. Summit started with messages of cooperation from the U.S. Congressman Chaka Fattah, the U.S. Congressman Blumenauer (Chairman of the Congressional Neuroscience Caucus) and Member of the Canadian Parliament Kirsty Duncan. The summit program included talks from top US, Australian, Italian, Turkish, and European Brain Mapping Initiative scientists covering topics such as advanced imaging in diagnosis of Alzheimer's disease, psychiatric disorders, brain cancers, neurodegenerative disorders, big data in brain mapping, strategies for global clinical trials, policies that could facilitate translation, integration and commercialization of devices and therapeutics such as nanoneurosurgery/nanoneuroscience, neurotrauma, and military medicine, as well as a roundtable discussion with the US and Canadian Policymakers.

=== Second Annual G20 World Brain Mapping Summit 2015 ===
Üsküdar University, Üsküdar University NPIstanbul Hospital and SBMT held second annual summit on G20 World Brain Mapping and Therapeutics Initiative in Istanbul, Turkey on 13 November. Then, the speakers met in Antalya where G20 Summit was held on 15 November, the result of the preliminary report was announced by Prof. Nevzat Tarhan, Rector of Üsküdar University and G20 Summit Final report was published.

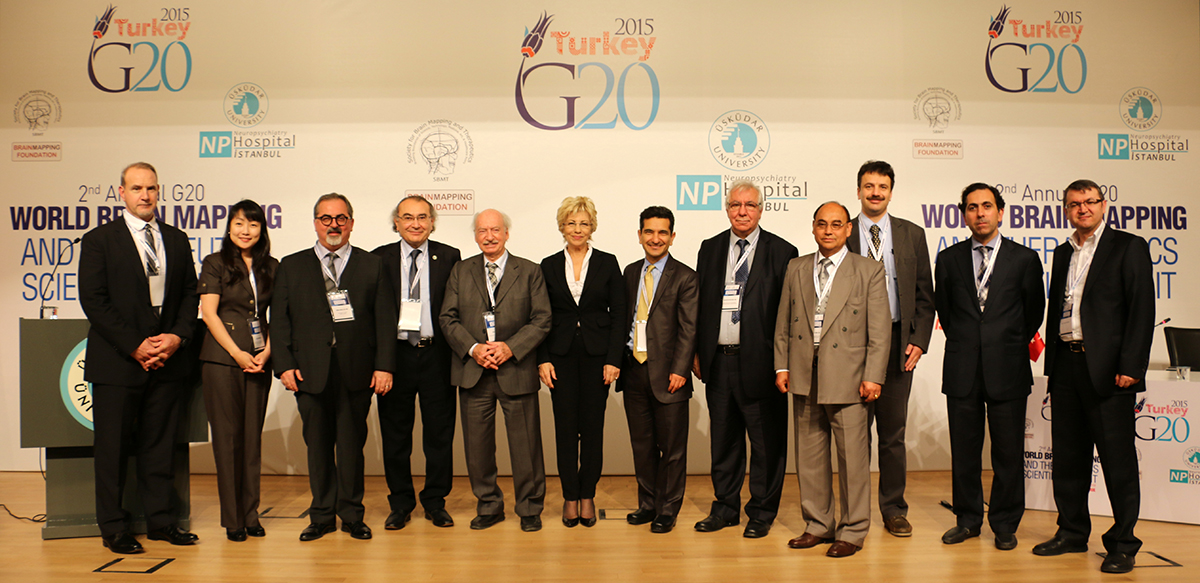
G20 Brain Mapping Istanbul 2015

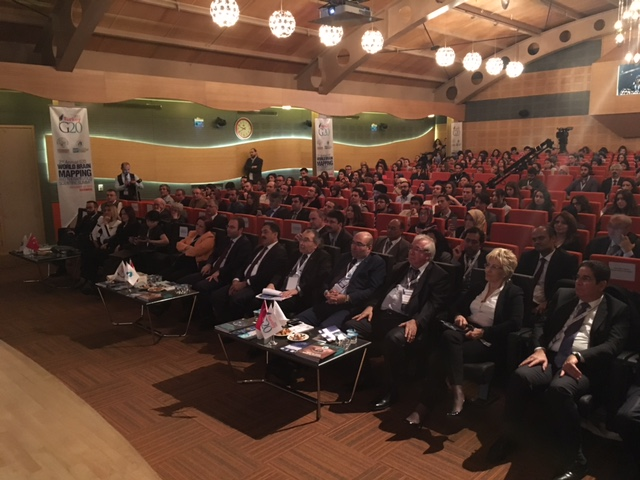
G20 Brain Mapping Istanbul 2015

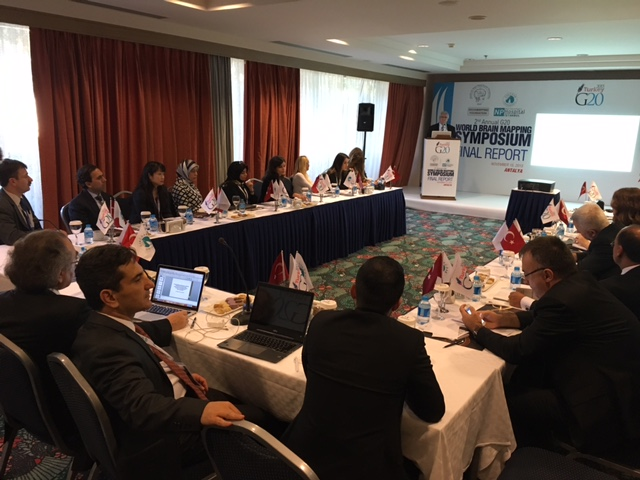
G20 Brain Mapping Antalya 2015
