= Furkan =

Furkan is a Turkish masculine given name, which means "criterion, proof, evidence, affirmation, testament". Notable people with the name include:

== Given name ==
- Furkan Akar (born 2002), Turkish short track speed skater
- Furkan Onur Akyüz (born 2005), Turkish footballer
- Furkan Alakmak (born 1991), Dutch-Turkish footballer
- Furkan Aldemir (born 1991), Turkish basketball player with Galatasara
- Furkan Andıç (born 1990), Turkish actor and model
- Furkan Asena Aydın (born 1992), Turkish female taekwondo practitioner (middleweight division)
- Furkan Aydın (born 1991), Turkish footballer
- Furkan Aydogdu (born 1988), Turkish-Austrian footballer
- Furkan Bayır (born 2000), Turkish footballer
- Furkan Bayrak (born 1995), Turkish wrestler
- Furkan Çamoğlu (born 2005), Turkish taekwondo athlete
- Furkan Demir (born 2004), Turkish-Austrian footballer
- Furkan Doğan (1991–2010), Turkish-American student killed in the Gaza flotilla raid
- Furkan Dursun (born 2005), Austrian footballer
- Furkan Haltalı (born 2002), Turkish basketball player
- Furkan Kircicek (born 1996), German footballer
- Furkan Korkmaz (born 1997), Turkish basketball player for the NBA's Philadelphia 76ers
- Furkan Külekçi (born 2001), Turkish footballer
- Furkan Kurban (born 1997), Dutch-Turkish footballer
- Furkan Ulaş Memiş (born 1991), Turkish amateur boxer who competed at the 2008 Olympics at flyweight
- Furkan Motori (born 1995), Swedish footballer
- Furkan Oruç (born 1996), Turkish archer
- Furkan Özçal (born 1990), in a Turkish footballer
- Furkan Palalı (born 1986), Turkish actor and model
- Furkan Polat (born 1998), Turkish footballer
- Furkan Soyalp (born 1995), Turkish footballer
- Furkan Tarhan (born 1980), Turkish businessman
- Furkan Yalçınkaya (born 1986), Turkish volleyball player
- Furkan Yaman (born 1996), Turkish footballer
- Furkan Zorba (born 1998), German-Turkish footballer

== See also ==
- Al-Furqan, the 25th sura of the Qur'an with 77 ayat
- Gaza Al-Furqan Mosque, a mosque located in Gaza City
- Furqan Force, volunteer fighting force when Pakistan was formed
- The True Furqan, al-Furqan al-Haqq, a book written in Arabic mirroring the Qur'an but incorporating elements of traditional Christian teachings
