= Chiman =

Chiman may refer to:

- Chiman people, an ethnic group of Bolivia
- Chiman language, a language of Bolivia
- Chimán, a town in Panama
  - Chimán District
- Çimən, a village in Azerbaijan
