= Tarhan (name) =

Tarhan is a Turkish origin name which is used as a surname and a masculine given name. Its Turkic language origin is the word tarkhan. Notable people with the name include:

== Surname ==
- Abdülhak Hâmid Tarhan (1852–1937), Turkish playwright and poet
- Ali Rana Tarhan (1883–1956), Turkish politician
- Bilge Tarhan (footballer) (1941–2016), Turkish football player
- Bilge Tarhan (gymnast) (born 2004), Turkish artistic gymnast
- Candan Tarhan (1942–1989), Turkish football manager
- Çınar Tarhan (born 1997), Turkish football player
- Emine Ülker Tarhan (born 1963), Turkish jurist and politician
- Furkan Tarhan (born 1980), Turkish businessman
- İhsan Yıldırım Tarhan (born 1980), Turkish boxer
- Mehmet Tarhan (born 1978), Turkish activist
- Mehmet Hayri Tarhan (1884–1934), Ottoman Turkish military officer
- Mümtaz Tarhan (1908–1970), Turkish politician
- Nevzat Tarhan (born 1952), Turkish psychiatrist
- Şevval İlayda Tarhan (born 2000), Turkish sports shooter

== Given name ==
- Tarhan Erdem (1933–2022), Turkish politician

== See also ==
- Tarhan, disambiguation page
