= Ciman =

Ciman may refer to:

- Laurent Ciman, a Belgian professional football player
- Çimən, a village in Azerbaijan

See also: Cimen (disambiguation)
