= Brain Mapping Foundation =

The Brain Mapping Foundation is a neuroscience organization established in 2004 by Babak Kateb to advance the cross-pollination of ideas between physical sciences, biological sciences, and neuroscience. The organization provides funding to the members of the Society for Brain Mapping and Therapeutics (SBMT). One of the foundation's focuses is to further establish and fund the National Center for NanoBioElectronics (NCNBE) to rapidly integrate nanotechnology, devices, imaging, cellular and stem cell therapy. The organization has played a significant role in President Obama's BRAIN initiative.

== Definition of brain mapping ==
The study of the anatomy and function of the brain and spinal cord through the use of imaging (including intraoperative, microscopic, endoscopic, and multimodal imaging), immunohistochemistry, molecular & optogenetics, stem cell and cellular biology, Engineering (material, electrical, and biomedical), neurophysiology and nanotechnology (See Brain Mapping for more information).

== Special projects ==
Currently, the organization is focused on establishing the Global Alliance for Nano-Bio-Electronics through its National Center for NanoBioElectronics, and it has shaped policies in the field of nanoneuroscience and nanoneurosurgery. In this regard, the foundation has established significant ties with international partners and plans to launch a global consortium in Neuroscience with a specific aim of integrating nanotechnology, devices, imaging and cellular therapy. BMF has signed a formal consortium agreement with Dr. Charlie Teo's Cure Brain Cancer Foundation in Australia, which is focused on eradicating brain cancers. NCNBE has also launched a graduate training program in NanoBioElectronics, which will be offering a PhD in NanoBioElectronics.

== Publications ==
BMF has been a major supporter of the Society for Brain Mapping and Therapeutics (SBMT) annual meetings and its publications. The Foundation supported a series of special issue publications with NeuroImage, in which members of the Society published their findings. The articles in these publications were discontinued when the Society established a partnership with PLOS ONE on the ″NeuroMapping & Therapeutics Collection.″ BMF also played a major role in publishing the first Textbook of Nanoneuroscience and Nanoneurosurgery.

== Funded projects ==
The foundation funds multidisciplinary translation research, such as:

1. Galaxy-Exploring Camera to Be Used in the Operating Room
2. JPL Nanotubes Help Advance Brain Tumor Research
3. NASA's Electronic Nose May Provide Neurosurgeons with A New Weapon Against Brain Cancer
4. X Marks the Spot; Infrared Technology used for Intraoperative Mapping of the Human Brain Tumors

The Brain Mapping Foundation has supported annual meetings of the Society for Brain Mapping and Therapeutics in the last 10 years.

== Brain Mapping Day at the US Congress ==
Brain Mapping Foundation, in collaboration with the Society for Brain Mapping and Therapeutics (SBMT), organizes Brain Mapping Days at the US Congress and Canadian Parliament to educate policymakers about state-of-the-art neuroscience research. More information about the Brain Mapping Days can be found at https://web.archive.org/web/20131022180145/http://www.worldbrainmapping.org/brain-mapping-day and http://www.worldbrainmapping.org/brain-research-day.

Several notable scientists, such as Dr. Keith L. Black and Jean Paul Allain, have briefed congressional leaders during the Brain Mapping Days organized by BMF and SMBT.

== Awards ==
Brain Mapping Foundation has partnered with Society for Brain Mapping and Therapeutics (SBMT) to identify the most valuable scientific and clinical contributions to the field, and recognize them with the prestigious “Pioneer” awards. The awards are presented in partnership with SBMT, industry leaders, and other foundations to highlight the contributions and significant work accomplished by scientists, industry leaders, individuals, and policymakers.

U.S. Congresswoman Gabby Giffords is the only award recipient to have been recognized twice by the Society and the Foundation for her courage and dedication in raising awareness about neurotrauma, as well as her role in reforming the healthcare system. She was awarded the Beacon of Courage and Dedication and Pioneer in Healthcare Policy award by the Foundation and the Society.

The Brain Mapping Foundation’s Humanitarian Award is given to “individuals who have contributed significantly to the survival and quality of life of patients around the world. Past award winners include Anthony Fauci, Geoffrey Ling, Sanjay Gupta, and, in 2024, Gary Michelson and Alya Michelson.

== Global Physicians and Scientists (GPS) ==
GPS is a humanitarian program that focuses on mobilizing physicians, scientists, and surgeons to serve for a few weeks in the poor and rural areas of the United States and abroad. This program collaborates with industry and government officials, utilizing national and international SBMT centers as bases of operations. The program is designed to help alleviate healthcare disparities by bringing world-class physicians to poor areas and to help improve local economies through microeconomics and neuroeconomics.
