= Nevzat Tarhan =

Turkish psychiatrist

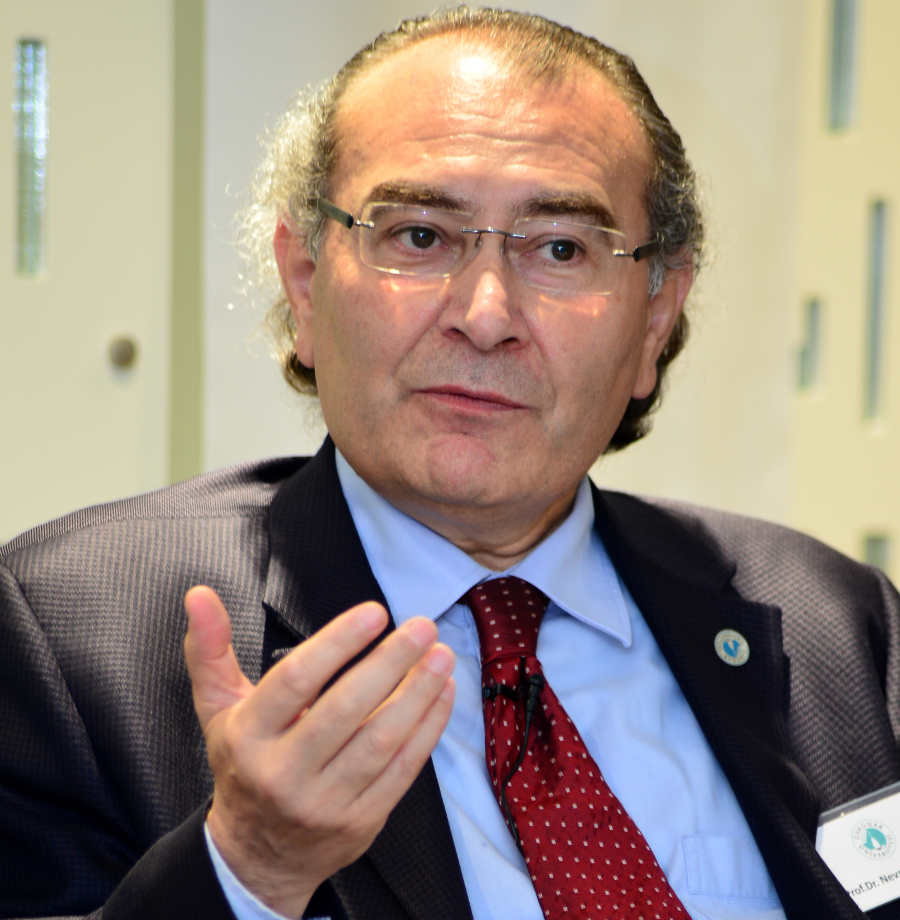
- Born: Kaşif Nevzat Tarhan; 7 July 1952 (age 74); Merzifon, Amasya, Turkey
- Education: Gülhane Military Medical Academy
- Occupations: Psychiatrist, neuropsychologist
- Notable work: Gülhane Military Medical Academy; Üsküdar University
- Spouse: Nermin Tarhan (m. 1979–2009)
- Children: A. Furkan Tarhan; M. Fırat Tarhan

Kaşif Nevzat Tarhan (born 7 July 1952) is a Turkish psychiatrist, psychological warfare and neuropsychology expert.

== Life ==
He was born in Merzifon in 1952.

He completed his education at Kuleli Military High School in 1969 and graduated from Istanbul University's Cerrahpaşa Medical School in 1975. Following his internship at GATA (Gülhane Military Medical Academy), he worked in Cyprus and Bursa garrisons at various military medical institutions. In 1982, he became a specialist psychiatrist at GATA. After serving as a specialist at Erzincan and Çorlu Hospitals, he was appointed assistant professor in 1988 and associate professor in 1990 at GATA Haydarpaşa. He was promoted to colonel in 1993 and became a professor in 1996.

Between 1996 and 1999, he worked as a faculty member at Yüzüncü Yıl University and as an expert at the Forensic Institution. He retired voluntarily and took the representation of the "Memory Center of America" in Turkey in 1998.

Turkish mob boss Sedat Peker claimed that Nevzat Tarhan is a psychological warfare consultant to SADAT.

He has been the chairman of the board of NPİSTANBUL, Turkey's first neuropsychiatry hospital, and is also the founding rector of Üsküdar University.

He has authored more than 100 publications, 31 of which are international. He speaks English and German. He is married and has two children.

== Social responsibility projects ==
- İDER Human Values and Mental Health Foundation, Chairman
- ASDER (Human rights organization) Defenders of Justice Association, Chairman
- Happy Home Happy Life Association, Chairman (Focusing on orphans and deprived children)
- Come Hold My Hand Association, Chairman (Child abuse and negligence)

== Congress and magazines ==
- 1989: "Stress and Diseases"
- 1991: "Innovations in Psychopharmacology"
- 1992: "Aggression"
- 1993: "Serotonin"

He took part in the organization committee of 7th International ECNS Congress which was held in İstanbul in 2007.

== Awards ==
- "Best Research and Best Researcher" in International Congress on "Destructive Drives and Impulse Control", Netherlands, 1991.
- "RTGD Best Community Program" for television program called "Reasonable Solutions" in TV, 2003
- "Supporting family training and protective community mental health services" with Psikoyorum TV program on Sky Turk 360 from Prime Ministry General Directorate of Family and Social Research, 2005.
- "Golden Apple" award by Amasya Foundation for his contribution to the use of Turkish Music in music therapy, 2007.
- "Crystal Tulip" award on Psychology category by Mümtaz Turhan Social Sciences High School of Istanbul 2009.
- "Patient Safety, Best Practice " award by OHSAD and Patient Safety Foundation, 2009
- "Award of Istanbul Congress Ambassador/2011" 7th ECNS "EEG and Clinical Neuroscience" Congress for organizing ECNS Congress in İstanbul, and making it possible for many world-famous scientists to come together.
- “From Universal Fellowship to World Peace Invitation Award” in Science and Research branch by World Fellowship Union Mevlana Supreme Foundation Universal, 2017.
- “Social Responsibility Award in Health” in 2017 by Health Volunteers Turkey and Hospital Manager Magazine due to his genuine contributions in health system.
- Awarded Golden Axon Leadership Award by SBMT in 2019.
- APA 2020 virtual Conference / Course of The Month of 2020-Computational Psychiatry & Future Perspectives, (APA), 2020.

== Membership in scholarly institutions ==
- New York Academy of Sciences, Member - 1997
- New York Academia Psychiatry Foundation, Member - 2001
- International Society for Neuroimaging in Psychiatry (ISNIP), Member - 2005
- American Psychiatric Association (APA), Member - 2005
- PsychoLife, Advisory Board Member - 2009
- International Psychogeriatric Association (IPA), Member - 2009
- Anatolian Journal of Psychiatry, Board Member - 2010
- Anxiety Disorders Association of America (ADAA), Member - 2013
- The Journal of Neurobehavioral Sciences, Editor - 2014
- EEG and Clinical Neuroscience Society (ECNS), Executive Board Member - 2015
- Society for Brain Mapping and Therapeutics (SBMT), Board Member - 2015
- International Society for Neuroregulation & Research (ISNR), Member - 2016
- Turkish American Neuropsychiatric Association (TANPA), President - 2017
- European College of Neuropsychopharmacology (ECNP), Member - 2018
- Journal of Current Addiction Research, Editor - 2018
- ASSAM International Refereed Journal, Editorial Board Member - 2018
- American Journal of Psychiatry and Neuroscience, Editorial Board Member - 2018
- Üsküdar University Journal of Social Sciences, Board Member - 2018
- AIMS Neuroscience, Editorial Board Member - 2018
- SSTB International Refereed Academic Journal of Sports, Health and Medical Sciences, Editorial Board Member - 2018
- Open Access Journal of Behavioural Science & Psychology, Editorial Board Member - 2018
- New Symposium, Editorial Board Member - 2020
- Cognitive Neurodynamic, Editorial Board Member - 2021
- The International Positive Psychology Association (IPPA), Member - 2022
- World Federation of Societies of Biological Psychiatry (WFSBP), Member - 2023
- European Psychiatric Association (EPA), Member - 2025

== Published books ==
- A Preliminary Study of Seed Based Functional Connectivity Analysis for Classification of MDD and Healthy Subjects Using Graph Metrics, (book section) 2019
- Family Therapy with Mawlana, 2019
- Conscious Youth, 2019
- Conscious Family, 2019
- Faith in the Laboratory, 2018
- Mom, what is a coup? (2017)
- Being a Conscious Family (2014)
- Love Therapy (2014)
- Yunus Therapy (2014)
- Positive Psychology, Co-authored (Orhan GÜMÜŞEL, Aynur SAYIM) Epsilon Publishing, 2008, İstanbul
- The Masnavi Therapy, Timas Publishing Group İstanbul 2012
- You Me and Our Kids, Timas Publishing Group 2012 İstanbul
- Bediuzzaman the conscience of the epoch, Nesil Yay. 2012 İstanbul
- A Model of Mature Man, Timas Publishing Group 2011, İstanbul
- Is there any one wanting to understand me? Timas Publishing Group. 2009, İstanbul.
- Of Life, Co-authored (Dr. Elif Ilgaz) Epsilon Publishing, 2008, İstanbul
- Family, The Last Refuge, Timas Publishing Group 2002. İstanbul.
- Psychology of Faith, Human Beings in the triangle of Sprit, Brain and Mind, Timas Publishing Group 2009. İstanbul
- Addiction, Timas Publishing Group 2002. İstanbul.
- Social Psychology; From Social Schizophrenia to Social Empathy Timas Publishing Group 2010, İstanbul.
- Psychological Warfare (Gray Propaganda), Timas Publishing Group 2002. İstanbul
- A Journey from Mind to Heart, Bediüzzaman Way, Nesil Yay. İstanbul 2012
- Woman Psychology, Nesil Publishing Group, 2005, İstanbul.
- Psychology of Happiness, Converting stress into happiness, Timas Publishing Group 2002, İstanbul.
- Reasonable Solution, A Guide for intra-family communication, Timas Publishing Group 2004, İstanbul.
- To be at peace with yourself. Zafer Yay. 2001. İstanbul.
- Psychology of Emotions, Timas Publishing Group 2006. İstanbul.
- Psychology of Marriage, Timas Publishing Group 2006. İstanbul
- Family School, Timas Publishing Group 2004.İstanbul
- Asymmetric War, Political psychology, Timas Publishing Group 2010, İstanbul.
- Innovations in Psychopharmacology, the Symposium Book. GATA 1991, Istanbul.
- Biological, Sociological, Psychological Aspects of Violence (co-authored), Yücel Yay. 2000. İstanbul.
- Stress and Diseases. Gri Ajans, 1990. İstanbul.
- Blood and Circulation (1982)
