= BRAIN Initiative =

Public-private research initiative

Understanding how the brain works is arguably one of the greatest scientific challenges of our time.

— Alivisatos et al.

The White House BRAIN Initiative (Brain Research through Advancing Innovative Neurotechnologies) is a collaborative, public-private research initiative announced by the second Obama administration on April 2, 2013, with its primary goal being to support the development and application of innovative technologies that can create a dynamic understanding of brain function.

This activity is a Grand Challenge focused on revolutionizing our understanding of the human brain, and was developed by the White House Office of Science and Technology Policy (OSTP) as part of a broader White House Neuroscience Initiative. Inspired by the Human Genome Project, BRAIN aims to help researchers uncover the mysteries of brain disorders, such as Alzheimer's and Parkinson's diseases, depression, and traumatic brain injury (TBI).

Participants and affiliates of the BRAIN project include DARPA, IARPA, as well as numerous private companies, universities, and other organizations in the United States, Australia, Canada, and Denmark.

== Background ==
The BRAIN Initiative reflects several influences, that stem back over a decade. Some of these include: planning meetings at the National Institutes of Health that led to the NIH's Blueprint for Neuroscience Research; workshops at the National Science Foundation (NSF) on cognition, neuroscience, and convergent science, including a 2006 report on "Grand Challenges of Mind and Brain"; reports from the National Research Council and the Institute of Medicine's Forum on Neuroscience and Nervous System Disorders, including "From Molecules to Mind: Challenges for the 21st Century," a report of a June 25, 2008 Workshop on Grand Challenges in Neuroscience.; years of research and reports from scientists and professional societies; and congressional interest.

One important activity was the Brain Activity Map Project. In September 2011, molecular biologist Miyoung Chun of The Kavli Foundation organized a conference in London, at which scientists first put forth the idea of such a project. At subsequent meetings, scientists from the United States government laboratories, including members of the Office of Science and Technology Policy, as well as from the Howard Hughes Medical Institute and the Allen Institute for Brain Science, along with representatives from Google, Microsoft, and Qualcomm, discussed possibilities for a future government-led project.

Other influences included the interdisciplinary "Decade of the Mind" project led by James L. Olds, who is currently the Assistant Director for Biological Sciences at NSF, and the "Revolutionizing Prosthetics" project at DARPA, led by Dr. Geoffrey Ling and shown on 60 Minutes in April 2009.

Development of the plan for the BRAIN Initiative within the Executive Office of the President (EOP) was led by OSTP and included the following EOP staff: Philip Rubin, then Principal Assistant Director for Science and leader of the White House Neuroscience Initiative; Thomas Kalil, Deputy Director for Technology and Innovation; Cristin Dorgelo, then Assistant Director for Grand Challenges, and later Chief of Staff at OSTP; and Carlos Peña, Assistant Director for Emerging Technologies and currently the Division Director for the Division of Neurological and Physical Medicine Devices, in the Office of Device Evaluation, Center for Devices and Radiological Health (CDRH), at the U.S. Food and Drug Administration (FDA).

== History ==
=== Announcement ===
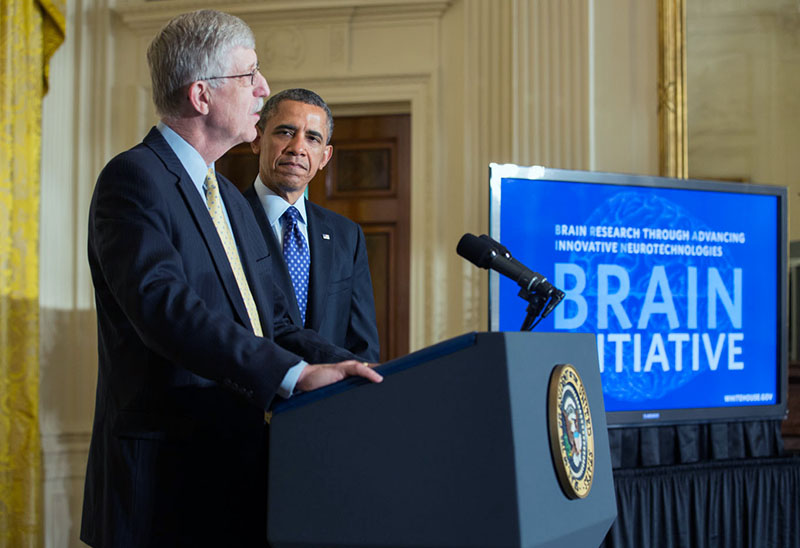
NIH Director Dr. Francis Collins and President Barack Obama announcing the BRAIN Initiative

On April 2, 2013, at a White House event, President Barack Obama announced the BRAIN Initiative, with proposed initial expenditures for fiscal year 2014 of approximately $110 million from the Defense Advanced Research Projects Agency (DARPA), the National Institutes of Health (NIH), and the National Science Foundation (NSF). The President also directed the Presidential Commission for the Study of Bioethical Issues to explore the ethical, legal, and societal implications raised by the initiative and by neuroscience in general. Additional commitments were also made by the Allen Institute for Brain Science, the Howard Hughes Medical Institute, and the Kavli Foundation. The NIH also announced the creation of a working group of the Advisory Committee to the Director, led by neuroscientists Cornelia Bargmann and William Newsome and with ex officio participation from DARPA and NSF, to help shape NIH's role in the BRAIN Initiative. Furthermore, NSF planned to receive advice from its directorate advisory committees, the National Science Board, and from a series of meetings that brought together scientists in neuroscience and related areas.

=== NeMO Archive ===
The Neuroscience Multi-Omic Archive (NeMO Archive) serves as the primary repository of genomic data from the BRAIN Initiative.

In April 2025, NeMO Archive, along with at least 33 other online archives, placed a disclaimer on their site that read, "This repository is under review for potential modification in compliance with Administration directives" as a result of Executive Order 14168. The principal investigator confirmed that the NeMO Archive was addressing NIH requests "to improve our security measures to protect human data" and anticipated the ongoing review to continue "for some time."

== Experimental approaches ==
According to news reports, the research intends to map the dynamics of neuron activity in mice and other animals and eventually the tens of billions of neurons in the human brain.

In a 2012 scientific commentary outlining experimental plans for a more limited project, Alivisatos et al. outlined a variety of specific experimental techniques that might be used to achieve what they termed a "functional connectome", as well as new technologies that will have to be developed in the course of the project. Among others, they indicated that initial studies might be performed in Caenorhabditis elegans, followed by Drosophila, because of their comparatively simple neural circuits. Additionally, mid-term studies could be performed in zebrafish, mice, and the Etruscan shrew, with subsequent studies ultimately to be conducted in primates and humans. They proposed the development of nanoparticles that could serve as voltage sensors to detect individual action potentials, as well as nanoprobes that could function as electrophysiological multielectrode arrays. In particular, they called for the use of wireless, non-invasive methods of detecting neuronal activity, either utilizing microelectronic very-large-scale integration or based on synthetic biology rather than microelectronics. In one such proposed method, enzymatically produced DNA would serve as a "ticker tape record" of neuronal activity, based on calcium ion-induced errors in DNA polymerase coding. Eventually, the obtained data would be analyzed and modeled by large scale computation. Moreover, a related technique proposed the use of high-throughput DNA sequencing for rapidly mapping neural connectivity.

=== Timeline ===
In 2014, the Working Group proposed the following timeline:

- 2016–2020: technology development and validation
- 2020–2025: application of those technologies in an integrated fashion, aimed at achieving new fundamental discoveries about the human brain

== Working group ==
The advisory committee is:

- Cornelia Bargmann, PhD (co-chair), The Rockefeller University
- William Newsome, PhD (co-chair), Stanford University
- David J. Anderson, PhD, California Institute of Technology
- Emery Brown, MD, PhD, Massachusetts Institute of Technology
- Karl Deisseroth, MD, PhD, Stanford University
- John Donoghue, PhD, Brown University
- Peter MacLeish, PhD, Morehouse School of Medicine
- Eve Marder, PhD, Brandeis University
- Richard A. Normann, PhD, University of Utah
- Joshua Sanes, PhD, Harvard University
- Mark Schnitzer, PhD, Stanford University
- Terry Sejnowski, PhD, Salk Institute for Biological Studies
- David Tank, PhD, Princeton University
- Roger Y. Tsien, PhD, University of California, San Diego
- Kamil Uğurbil, PhD, University of Minnesota

== Participants ==
As of December 2018, the BRAIN Initiative website lists the following participants and affiliates:

- National Institutes of Health (Alliance Member)
- National Science Foundation (Alliance Member)
- U.S. Food and Drug Administration (Alliance Member)
- Intelligence Advanced Research Projects Activity (Alliance Member)
- White House BRAIN Initiative (Alliance Affiliate)
- Defense Advanced Research Projects Agency (B.I. Participant)
- Simons Foundation (Alliance Member)
- National Photonics Initiative (B.I. Participant)
- Allen Institute for Brain Science (Alliance Member)
- Janelia/Howard Hughes Medical Institute (Alliance Affiliate)
- Neurotechnology Architecting Network (B.I. Participant)
- Pacific Northwest Neuroscience Neighborhood (B.I. Participant)
- University of California System Cal-BRAIN (B.I. Participant)
- University of Pittsburgh Brain Institute (B.I. Participant)
- Blackrock Microsystems (B.I. Participant)
- GlaxoSmithKline (B.I. Participant)
- Brain & Behavior Research Foundation (B.I. Participant)
- Boston University Center for Systems Neuroscience (B.I. Participant)
- General Electric (B.I. Participant)
- Boston Scientific (B.I. Participant)
- Carnegie Mellon University BrainHub (B.I. Participant)
- NeuroNexus (B.I. Participant)
- Medtronic (B.I. Participant)
- Pediatric Brain Foundation (B.I. Participant)
- University of Texas System UT Neuroscience (B.I. Participant)
- University of Arizona Center for Innovation in Brain Science (B.I. Participant)
- Salk Institute for Biological Studies (B.I. Participant)
- Second Sight (B.I. Participant)
- Kavli Foundation (Alliance Member)
- University of Utah Neurosciences Gateway (B.I. Participant)
- Blackrock Microsystems (B.I. Participant)
- Ripple (B.I. Participant)
- Lawrence Livermore National Laboratory (B.I. Participant)
- NeuroPace (B.I. Participant)
- Google (B.I. Participant)
- Inscopix (B.I. Participant)
- Australian National Health and Medical Research Council (B.I. Participant)
- Brain Canada Foundation (B.I. Participant)
- Denmark's Lundbeck Foundation (B.I. Participant).

== Reactions ==
Several scientists offered differing views of the plan. Neuroscientist John Donoghue stated that the project has the potential to fill a gap in neuroscience research between, on the one hand, activity measurements at the level of brain regions using methods such as fMRI, and, on the other hand, measurements at the level of single cells. Psychologist Ed Vul expressed concern, however, that the initiative would divert funding from individual investigator studies. Neuroscientist Donald Stein expressed concern, believing it would be a mistake to initiate the project by allocating financial resources to the development of different technological methods before specifically outlining which neurological activities and parameters would be measured exactly. On the other hand, physicist Michael Roukes argued that nanotechnology research methods have been steadily evolving and have already become sufficiently developed to make the time right for a brain activity map. Neuroscientist Rodolfo Llinás declared at the first Rockefeller meeting, "What has happened here is magnificent, never before in neuroscience have I seen so much unity in such a glorious purpose."

The projects face great logistical challenges. Neuroscientists estimated that the project would generate 300 exabytes of data annually, presenting a significant technical barrier. Most of the available high-resolution brain activity monitors are of limited use, as they require invasive surgical implantation with the opening of the skull. Parallels have been drawn to past large-scale government-led research efforts, including the map of the human genome, the voyage to the moon, and the development of the atomic bomb.

== See also ==
- Allen Brain Atlas
- Blue Brain Project
- BrainMaps
- Brain Mapping Foundation
- Brain/MINDS
- China Brain Project
- Decade of the Brain
- Decade of the Mind
- G20 World Brain Mapping & Therapeutic Scientific Summit
- Human Connectome Project
- List of animals by number of neurons
- List of neuroscience databases
- Organization for Human Brain Mapping
- Outline of brain mapping
- Outline of the human brain
- Society for Brain Mapping and Therapeutics
- SpiNNaker
