= Cristin =

Cristin is a given name and surname. It may refer to:

== Surname ==
- Alexandra Cristin (born 1989), American model, reality television personality, and the founder of Glam Seamless
- Diego Cristin (born 1981), former professional tennis player from Argentina
- Manlio Cristin

== Given name ==
- Cristin Joy Alexander (born c. 1987), Caymanian beauty pageant titleholder
- Cristín Eugenio Cibils González (born 1956), Paraguayan former football defender
- Cristin Claas (born 1977), German vocalist and jazz singer
- Cristín Granados (born 1989), Costa Rican footballer
- Cristin Dorgelo (née Lindsay), American CEO and President of the Association of Science-Technology Centers
- Cristin Duren, Miss Florida USA for the year 2006
- Cristin Jalbă (born 1997), Moldovan football defender
- Cristin Milioti (born 1985), American actress and singer
- Cristin verch Goronwy (12th century), the second wife of Owain Gwynedd, King of Wales
- Cristin O'Keefe Aptowicz (born 1978), American poet and bestselling nonfiction writer of The New York Times

== See also ==
- CRIStin, acronym for Current Research Information System in Norway, national system owned by the Royal Ministry of Education
