= Çimen =

Çimen is a Turkish surname. Notable people with the surname include:

- Ali Cimen, Turkish journalist
- Daniyel Cimen, German footballer
- Derya Çimen, Turkish model
- Mazlum Çimen, Turkish musician
- Uğur Çimen, Turkish football coach

== See also ==
- Ciment
