= Tekin =

Tekin is a Turkish name and surname derived from the Turkic word Tegin, which means king and/or prince. It may refer to:

== Given name ==
- Tekin Alp (1883–1961), Turkish politician
- Tekin Arıburun (1903–1993), Turkish soldier and statesman
- Tekin Bilge (1930–2016), Turkish footballer
- Tekin Bingöl (born 1955), Turkish politician
- Tekin Dereli (born 1949), Turkish theoretical physicist
- Türker Tekin Ergüzel (born 1978), Turkish professor
- Tekin Kartal (1990–2024), Kurdish drug trafficker and gangster
- Tekin Kurtuluş (born 1968), German actor
- Tekin Okan Düzgün (born 1988), Turkish Paralympian goalball player
- Tekin Sazlog (born 1976), Turkish footballer

== Surname ==
- Barchuq Art Tegin, 12th-century Uyghur king
- Bülent Tekin (born 1954), Kurdish poet and writer
- Deniz Tekin (born 1997), Turkish musician
- Eda Tekin (born 1999), Turkish wrestler
- Galip Tekin (1958–2017), Turkish artist and screenwriter
- Gürsel Tekin (born 1964), Turkish politician
- Harun Tekin (born 1977), Turkish singer
- Harun Tekin (born 1989), Turkish footballer
- Kerim Tekin (1975–1998), Turkish musician
- Latife Tekin (born 1957), Turkish female writer
- Metin Tekin (born 1964), retired Turkish footballer
- Muzaffer Tekin (1950–2015), Turkish army officer and criminal
- Özlem Tekin (born 1971), Turkish singer and actress
- Talât Tekin (1927–2015), Turkish researcher
- Taro Emir Tekin (born 1997), Turkish actor
- Tolga Tekin (born 1973), Turkish actor
- Yusuf Tekin (born 197), Turkish bureaucrat and politician

== See also ==
- Tekin, Dinar; village in Afyonkarahisar Province, Turkey
- Tekin, Germencik; neighborhood in Aydin Province, Turkey
