= Öztekin =

Öztekin is a Turkish surname constructed by fusing the Turkish names Öz ("self", "essence", "extract") and Tekin ("the only", "single").
Notable people with the surname include:

- Ahmet Nuri Öztekin (1876–1951), Turkish officer of the Ottoman Army and the Turkish Army
- Rasim Öztekin (1959–2021), Turkish actor
- Yasin Öztekin (born 1987), Turkish football player
