= SBMT =

SBMT may refer to:

== Acronyms ==
- Campo de Marte Airport's ICAO code
- Society for Brain Mapping and Therapeutics
- South Bay Musical Theatre
- South Brooklyn Marine Terminal
- Software Based Modeling Tool (as said in Agile software development)
