= Düzcespor =

Turkish football club

- Full name: Düzcecam Düzcespor Kulübü
- Founded: 1967
- Ground: Düzce Şehir Stadium, Düzce
- Capacity: 5000
- Chairman: Mehmet Saygun
- Manager: Kadir Kar
- League: TFF Third League
- 2023–24: TFF Second League Red Group, 17th of 19 (relegated)
- Website: http://www.duzcespor.org.tr/
Home colours	Away colours

Düzcespor is a Turkish football club located in Düzce, Turkey. The club colors are red-navy blue.

== History ==
The club was founded in 1967 and the first chairman was Atıf Bilginen. Former Fenerbahçe Chairman Aziz Yıldırım is the honorary chairman of Düzcespor. The club had tough times after the 1999 İzmit earthquake and the 1999 Düzce earthquake that hit the city. As a consequence the club withdrew for the 1999–2000 season without losing their right to compete in the following season in the TFF Second League.

In January 2024, the club announced that Şıralık City Stadium would be renamed the İştirak Düzce City Stadium until the end of the season.

== League participations ==
- TFF First League: 1968–1970, 1977–1989, 1994–1998, 1999–2001
- TFF Second League: 1967–1968, 1970–1977, 1989–1994, 1998–1999, 2022–2024
- TFF Third League: 2001–2003, 2008–2010, 2015–2022, 2024–
- Turkish Regional Amateur League: 2010–2012, 2014–15
- Düzce Amateur League: 2003–2008, 2012–14

== Current squad ==
As of 8 September 2022

Note: Flags indicate national team as defined under FIFA eligibility rules; some limited exceptions apply. Players may hold more than one non-FIFA nationality.

No.	Pos.	Nation	Player
1	GK	(Turkey) TUR	Ersin Aydın
4	DF	(Turkey) TUR	Doğan Can Otman
5	MF	(Turkey) TUR	Emre Keleşoğlu
6	MF	(Turkey) TUR	Hasan Küçcük
7	FW	(Turkey) TUR	Samet Eker
9	FW	(Germany) GER	Yasin Ozan
10	MF	(Turkey) TUR	Mehmet Özdıraz
11	FW	(Turkey) TUR	Timur Kosovalı
12	DF	(Turkey) TUR	Kerem Kaya (on loan from Pendikspor)
17	MF	(Turkey) TUR	Emre Gündoğdu
18	MF	(Turkey) TUR	Çınar Tarhan

No.	Pos.	Nation	Player
20	DF	(Turkey) TUR	Savaş Polat
22	DF	(Turkey) TUR	Erçin Ilgaz
23	DF	(Turkey) TUR	Berkehan Biçer
27	FW	(Turkey) TUR	İlkay İşler
33	DF	(Turkey) TUR	Mümin Talip Pazarlı
34	GK	(Turkey) TUR	Ömer Faruk Ay
44	DF	(France) FRA	Recep Kalkan
70	DF	(Turkey) TUR	Alperen Özşahin
77	FW	(Turkey) TUR	Altar Han Hidayetoğlu (on loan from Altınordu)
81	MF	(Turkey) TUR	Osman Boz
88	DF	(Turkey) TUR	Hamit Kulya

=== Other players under contract ===
Note: Flags indicate national team as defined under FIFA eligibility rules; some limited exceptions apply. Players may hold more than one non-FIFA nationality.

No.	Pos.	Nation	Player
—	MF	(Austria) AUT	Muhammed Barutcu

=== Out on loan ===
Note: Flags indicate national team as defined under FIFA eligibility rules; some limited exceptions apply. Players may hold more than one non-FIFA nationality.

No.	Pos.	Nation	Player
—	FW	(Turkey) TUR	Onur Civelek (at Osmaniyespor FK until 30 June 2023)
