= Cristin Dorgelo =

American science policy person

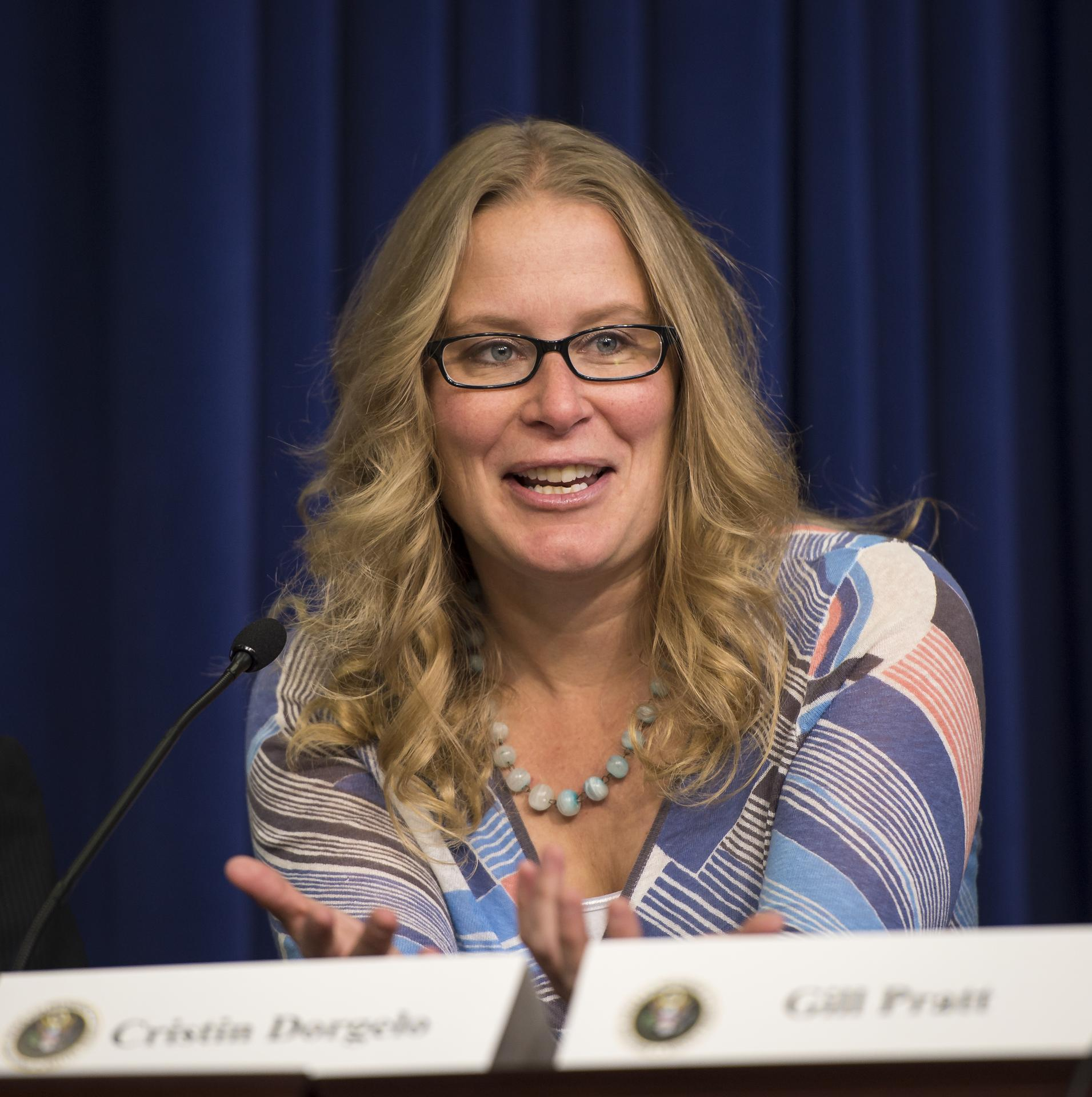
- Education: University of California, Los Angeles (BA)
- Political party: Democratic

Cristin Ann Dorgelo is a former government official who was the senior advisor for management at the White House Office of Management and Budget in the Biden Administration. Dorgelo is the president emeritus of the Association of Science and Technology Centers, where she previously served as president and CEO. Dorgelo served as the chief of staff at the Office of Science and Technology Policy during the Barack Obama White House.

== Education and early career ==
Dorgelo grew up in Southern California. She studied at University of California, Los Angeles. She earned a bachelor's degree in history with a minor in anthropology. She worked at the Los Angeles Times from 1996 to 1999, in advertising operations. She was part of the Leadership and Organizational Development group at Times Mirror, managing professional and organizational development programs, until Times Mirror merged with Tribune Co. in 2000.

== Career ==
Dorgelo was a project manager at Idealab from 2000 to 2004, helping to launch several startup companies. While at Idealab, she was part of the founding team of X1 Technologies, and she worked as X1's director of operations until 2006. Dorgelo was part of the X Prize Foundation, between 2006 and 2012, where as vice president of prize operations she managed the $30 million Google Lunar X Prize, the $10million Progressive Insurance Automotive X Prize, the $10 million Archon Genomics X PRIZE, the $2.5 million Northrop Grumman Lunar Lander Challenge and the $2.4 million Wendy Schmidt Oil Cleanup X Challenge.

Dorgelo joined the White House Office of Science and Technology Policy in 2012, where she served until the end of the Obama administration in 2017. As assistant director for Grand Challenges from 2012 to 2014, she helped Federal agencies engage in open innovation by offering incentive prizes, challenges, and crowdsourcing programs, including on Challenge.gov, which won the 2013 “Innovations in American Government Award” from Harvard's Ash Center for Democratic Governance and Innovation. She released three reports from the Office of Science and Technology Policy to Congress on the use of prizes and challenges by Federal agencies under the America COMPETES Act of 2010. She spoke at the 2012 South by Southwest conference on the role of prizes and challenges in catalyzing innovation and engaging citizen solvers, and at a Washington Post event on the role of public-private partnerships. She supported the federal Challenges and Prizes Community of Practice.

With Thomas Kalil, Dorgelo led the White House's "Grand Challenges". Incentive prizes and Grand Challenges were both part of Barack Obama's innovation strategy, aiming to catalyze breakthroughs towards national priorities. The Obama administration's Grand Challenges included the BRAIN Initiative, the United States Department of Energy SunShot Initiative and EV Everywhere Challenge, NASA's Asteroid Grand Challenge and United States Agency for International Development Grand Challenge for Development. She was interested in engaging citizens broadly in efforts to address Grand Challenges. Through her role in the Grand Challenges she became interested in citizen engagement. In 2013 she delivered a FED Talk on engaging the public in Grand Challenges, and in 2014, she delivered a keynote address on Grand Challenges at the Department of Energy's SunShot Grand Challenge Summit. She was named a “Tech Titan” in 2013 by Washingtonian Magazine, and in 2014 Fedscoop named her one of Washington DC's “Top 50 Women in Tech". Dorgelo helped start "We the Geeks," a White House series of Google Hangouts that highlighted the future of science, technology, and innovation here in the United States.

At the Office of Science and Technology Policy from 2014 to 2017 Dorgelo served as chief of staff to Obama's science advisor John Holdren, as well as to the United States Chief Technology Officer (Todd Park in 2014 and Megan Smith in 2014–2017), supporting policy development across a broad array of science and technology issues. In 2016 she released for the Office of Science and Technology Policy a list of 100 examples of Barack Obama's legacy on US science and technology. These examples included new innovation positions in the US Federal government, the Presidential Innovation Fellows Program, a $18.3 billion increase in research funding and $1 billion support for K–12 STEM education. She led a White House initiative to encourage individuals to pursue Grand Challenges, encouraging people to get involved with citizen science and crowdsourcing. She delivered a plenary talk at the American Association for the Advancement of Science Science & Technology Policy Fellowships workshop. She coordinated the White House Frontiers Conference in 2016, described by Megan Smith as "a big American barn-raising" of ideas. In 2017 at the end of the Obama administration she released with John Holdren and Megan Smith an “exit memo” from Obama's Office of Science and Technology Policy on science and technology frontiers.

Barack Obama appointed Dorgelo to the National Infrastructure Advisory Council in 2017. With seven fellow council members, she resigned later that year in protest of the policies of President Donald Trump. She encouraged scientists to engage with the public and advocate for evidence-based policy making during the Donald Trump presidency, and critiqued the Trump administration's sidelining of science and federal scientists.

After leaving the White House, Dorgelo continued to engage universities and others in Grand Challenges initiatives, working with Michelle Popowitz at UCLA in 2017–2018 to convene a Grand Challenges community of practice for universities and release a report summarizing the state of Grand Challenge programs across more than 20 North American universities.

In January 2018 Dorgelo became the president and chief executive officer of the Association of Science-Technology Centers, supporting science centers and museums in increasing access to science learning and engagement. In this role, Dorgelo promoted the importance of science communication and engagement and continued to advance science policy at the federal level. NASA Administrator Jim Bridenstine appointed Dorgelo to the NASA Advisory Council STEM Engagement Committee in 2018, where she served through 2020. Dorglelo served on the International Science Council's Committee for Science Planning from 2019 to 2020. Dorgelo is a commissioner on the Aspen Institution's K-12 Climate Action Commission. Dorgelo is a supporter and mentor for the Brooke Owens Fellowship. She is a supporter of—and participant in—the programs of Cultivate the Karass, a nonprofit focused on building relationships among emerging leaders across partisan and ideological lines.

In November 2020, Dorgelo was named a member of the Joe Biden presidential transition Agency Review Team to support transition efforts related to the Office of Science and Technology Policy. In January 2021, Dorgelo was named senior advisor for management at the White House Office of Management and Budget.
