= Savaş Polat =

Turkish footballer

Personal information
- Date of birth: 14 April 1997 (age 29)
- Place of birth: Muş, Turkey
- Height: 1.73 m (5 ft 8 in)
- Position: Right back

Team information
- Current team: Düzcespor
- Number: 20

Youth career
- 2010–2011: Güzeltepe Gençlikspor
- 2011–2014: Fenerbahçe A2

Senior career*
Years	Team	Apps	(Gls)
2014–2017	Fenerbahçe A2	79	(7)
2017–2021	Konyaspor	0	(0)
2017–2018	→ A. Selçukspor (loan)	16	(0)
2018–2019	→ Giresunspor (loan)	11	(0)
2020	→ Adanaspor (loan)	12	(0)
2020–2021	→ 1922 Konyaspor (loan)	12	(1)
2021	Turgutluspor	14	(0)
2021–2022	Ergene Velimeşe	30	(1)
2022–	Düzcespor	3	(0)

International career^{‡}
2012–2013	Turkey U-16	22	(2)
2012–2014	Turkey U-17	22	(0)
2014–2015	Turkey U-18	7	(0)
2015–2016	Turkey U-19	9	(0)
2018	Turkey U-20	5	(0)
2018	Turkey U-21	9	(0)
- * Club domestic league appearances and goals as of 15 October 2022 ‡ National team caps and goals as of 27 March 2018

Savaş Polat (born 14 April 1997) is a Turkish footballer who plays for Düzcespor.

== Club career ==
He made his debut for the first team of Fenerbahçe on 2 December 2014 in the Turkish Cup match against Kayserispor which they lost 2–1.
