= Brujas, Panama =

Brujas
- Corregimiento
- Location within Panamá Province Location within Panama
- Coordinates: 8.5861°N 78.5314°W
- Country: Panama
- Province: Panamá
- District: Chimán

Area
  - Land: 159.6 km^{2} (61.6 sq mi)

Population (2010)
  - Total: 688
  - Density: 4.3/km^{2} (11/sq mi)
- Population density calculated based on land area.
- Time zone: UTC−5 (EST)

Brujas is a corregimiento in Chimán District, Panamá Province, Panama with a population of 688 as of 2010. Its population as of 1990 was 568; its population as of 2000 was 932.
