= Tarhan =

Tarhan may refer to:

- Tarhan District, an administrative division of Kuhdasht County, Lorestan province, Iran
- Tarhan-e Gharbi Rural District, an administrative division of Kuhdasht County, Lorestan province, Iran
- Tarhan-e Sharqi Rural District, an administrative division of Kuhdasht County, Lorestan province, Iran
- Tarhan Tower Airlines, charter airline based in Istanbul, Turkey
- Tarhan, Çorum, village in Turkey
- Tarhan (name), list of people with the name

== See also ==
- Tarhana, Southeast European and Middle Eastern dried food made of grain, fermented yoghurt or fermented milk
