= Unión Santeña =

- Corregimiento
- Location within Panamá Province Location within Panama
- Coordinates: 8.7647°N 78.7300°W
- Country: Panama
- Province: Panamá
- District: Chimán
- Established: January 19, 1998

Area
  - Land: 361.9 km^{2} (139.7 sq mi)

Population (2010)
  - Total: 920
  - Density: 2.5/km^{2} (6.5/sq mi)
- Population density calculated based on land area.
- Time zone: UTC−5 (EST)

Unión Santeña is a corregimiento in Chimán District, Panamá Province, Panama with a population of 920 as of 2010. It was created by Law 5 of January 19, 1998. Its population as of 2000 was 1,023.
