= Cimento =

Cimento may refer to:

- Accademia del Cimento, a 17th-century Florentine learned society
- Edson Cimento (born 1954), Brazilian footballer
- Nuovo Cimento, and its predecessor, Il Cimento, Italian scientific journals established 1844

== See also ==
- Ciment, a surname
