= Richard A. Normann =

- Occupation: Bioengineer

Richard A. Normann is a Distinguished Professor of Bioengineering at the University of Utah. He is known for inventing the Utah array in-vivo electrode array for brain–computer interfaces and is presently on the advisory committee of the White House BRAIN Initiative. He received his PhD in 1973 from UC Berkeley in electrical engineering. He received an honorary doctorate in 2012 from Miguel Hernández University in Elche, Spain.

The Utah array was first developed, under his guidance and this technology is currently in use at other centres around the world, where it provides a vital link between the central nervous systems of rats, cats, monkeys and other laboratory animals, and the computers used to study their brain patterns.
