= Tayfun Uzbay =

- Born: İsmail Tayfun Uzbay; 12 June 1959 (age 67); Ordu, Turkey

İsmail Tayfun Uzbay (born September 1959) is a Turkish neuropsychopharmacologist.

== Life ==
Uzbay graduated from Ünye High School and received his bachelor's degree in the Faculty of Pharmacy from Istanbul University in 1982. He completed his doctorate in 1992 at Gülhane Military Medical Academy (GATA) in the field of Medical Pharmacology. He received the title of Associate Professorship in 1995. He worked in the field of Pharmacology in the Institute of Medical Sciences in North Texas University with scholarships from both TÜBİTAK and North Texas University. In 1999, he won a scholarship and worked as a research assistant in the department of Toxicology in the Faculty of Pharmaceutics in Cagliari University in Italy. He received the title of Professorship in 2003. Between the years 2003 and 2011, he worked as the Head of the Department of Medical Pharmacology in GATA. From 2011 until 2013, he worked as a member of High Science Council in GATA. He retired from the Turkish Armed Forces in 2013. Today he is still working as the Head of the Departments of Molecular Biology and Genetics and Neuroscience in Üsküdar University, as well as the director of Neuropsychopharmacology Research and Application Center.

Prof. Dr. Uzbay, who resumes his studies in the field of neuropsychopharmacology, has seven books in Turkish and one book in English. He has received the Roche Medical Research Prize (1994), Pharmacy Academy Science Prize (2005), Prof. Dr. Rasim Adasal Science Prize (2005), Popular Science Prize (2007), Brain Research Foundation Publication Promotion Prize (2008).

Uzbay patented three molecules which are candidate drugs to the generation of schizophrenia disorder, its diagnosis and treatment. His work in this field have been honoured by the Turkish Armed Forces by the New Inventions Strip Badge and the Headquarters Outstanding Service Award. Prof. Dr. Uzbay has worked on the subject of Alcohol and Substance Dependence and has significant publications in this field as well.

Prof. Dr. Tayfun Uzbay is married and the father of one child.

== Awards ==
Uzbay has received the following awards:

- (1994) Roche Psychiatry Science Award
- (2005) Academy of Pharmacy (Turkish Pharmacist Association) Science Award
- (2005) Turkish Social Psychiatry Association, Professor Rasim Adasal Science Award
- (2008) Popular Science Award, Health Science
- (2008) Brain Research Society Publication Award
- (2009) Specific solutions: Project Marketing and Awards (Ege Üniversity, EBİLTEM, TÜBİTAK and ELGİNKAN Foundation), First Degree
- (2015) The Best Scientists Award of Turkey (TAF NETWORK, Turkish Academic Fellowship)
- (2016) Friend of Schizophrenics award (Mental Health and Treatment Foundation of Turkey)
- (2016) Incentive and Honor Award (BAYEV)

== Publications ==
Uzbay has written the following book in English:

- Uzbay, I.T. (ed.), A New Approach to Etiopathogenezis of Depression: Neuroplasticity. NOVA Publishers, New York City, 2011 (ISBN 978-1-61209-554-7).
