= Pásiga =

- Corregimiento
- Location within Panamá Province Location within Panama
- Coordinates: 8°56′32.17″N 78°54′41.58″W
- Country: Panama
- Province: Panamá
- District: Chimán
- Established: January 19, 1998

Area
  - Land: 201.4 km^{2} (77.8 sq mi)

Population (2010)
  - Total: 439
  - Density: 2.2/km^{2} (5.7/sq mi)
- Population density calculated based on land area.
- Time zone: UTC−5 (EST)

Pásiga is a corregimiento in Chimán District, Panamá Province, Panama with a population of 439 as of 2010. It was created by Law 5 of January 19, 1998. Its population as of 2000 was 441.
