= Ciment =

Ciment is a surname. Notable people with the surname include:

- Jill Ciment (born 1955), American writer
- Michel Ciment (1938–2023), French film critic

== See also ==
- Çimen, a Turkish surname
- Cimento, disambiguation page
