= Gonzalo Vásquez =

- Corregimiento
- Location within Panamá Province Location within Panama
- Coordinates: 8.4167°N 78.4500°W
- Country: Panama
- Province: Panamá
- District: Chimán

Area
  - Land: 42.2 km^{2} (16.3 sq mi)

Population (2010)
  - Total: 91
  - Density: 2.2/km^{2} (5.7/sq mi)
- Population density calculated based on land area.
- Time zone: UTC−5 (EST)

Gonzalo Vásquez is a corregimiento in Chimán District, Panamá Province, Panama with a population of 91 as of 2010. Its population as of 1990 was 277; its population as of 2000 was 356.
