= Biological Technologies Office (DARPA) =

The Biological Technologies Office (BTO) is one of the seven technical offices within DARPA, an agency of the U.S. Department of Defense that is responsible for the development of advanced technology for national security. BTO was created in 2014 by combining some programs from the Defense Sciences Office (DSO) and the Microsystems Technology Office (MTO). The office focuses on basic and applied research in the areas of gene editing, biotechnologies, neurosciences and synthetic biology — from powered exoskeletons for soldiers to brain implants that can control mental disorders.

DARPA’s embrace of bioscience began in earnest in 2001, when anthrax spores posted to media offices and members of the US Congress brought concerns about bioterrorism to the fore. Then came the wars in Afghanistan and Iraq, which led the agency to invest in fields such as neuroscience, psychology and brain-computer interfaces — all with the intention of helping injured veterans. By 2013, the number of biology-related programmes had grown such that DARPA decided to consolidate them under one roof.

== Organization ==
The first BTO office director in 2014-2015 - Dr. Geoffrey Ling, MD.

The current BTO office director is Dr. Michael Koeris, who joined DARPA from Industry and is supported by Robert Saperstein, PhD. Koeris’ predecessor was Dr. Kerri Dugan, who joined DARPA in 2019.

== Active Programs ==
The BTO focused on leveraging advances in engineering and information sciences to drive and reshape biotechnology for technological advantage. BTO is responsible for all neurotechnology, human-machine interface, human performance, infectious disease, and synthetic biology programs within the agency.

- Advanced Plant Technologies (APT)
- Atmospheric Water Extraction (AWE)
- Autonomous Diagnostics to Enable Prevention and Therapeutics (ADEPT)
- Battlefield Medicine
- Bioelectronics for Tissue Regeneration (BETR)
- Biological Control
- Biological Robustness in Complex Settings (BRICS)
- Biostasis
- Bridging the Gap (BG+)
- Detect It with Gene Editing Technologies (DIGET)
- Dialysis-Like Therapeutics (DLT)
- Electrical Prescriptions (ElectRx)
- Engineered Living Materials (ELM)
- Epigenetic CHaracterization and Observation (ECHO)
- Focused Pharma
- Friend or Foe
- Hand Proprioception and Touch Interfaces (HAPTIX)
- In Vivo Nanoplatforms (IVN)
- Insect Allies (2017-2021)
- Intelligent Neural Interfaces (INI)
- INTERfering and Co-Evolving Prevention and Therapy (INTERCEPT)
- Living Foundries
- Measuring Biological Aptitude (MBA)
- Microphysiological Systems (MPS)
- Neural Engineering System Design (NESD)
- Neuro Function, Activity, Structure, and Technology (Neuro-FAST)
- Next-Generation Nonsurgical Neurotechnology (N3)
- Nucleic acids On-demand Worldwide (NOW)
- Panacea
- Pandemic Prevention Platform (P3)
- Persistent Aquatic Living Sensors (PALS)
- Personalized Protective Biosystem (PPB)
- PReemtive Expression of Protective Alleles and Response Elements (PREPARE)
- PREventing EMerging Pathogenetic Threats (PREEMPT)
- Prometheus
- Rapid Threat Assessment
- ReSource
- Restoring Active Memory (RAM)
- ReVector
- Revolutionizing Prosthetics
- Safe Genes
- Systems-Based Neurotechnology for Emerging Therapies (SUBNETS)
- Targeted Neuroplasticity Training (TNT)
- Technologies for Host Resilience (THoR)

== See also ==
- AbCellera
