= Ali Çimen =

Turkish journalist

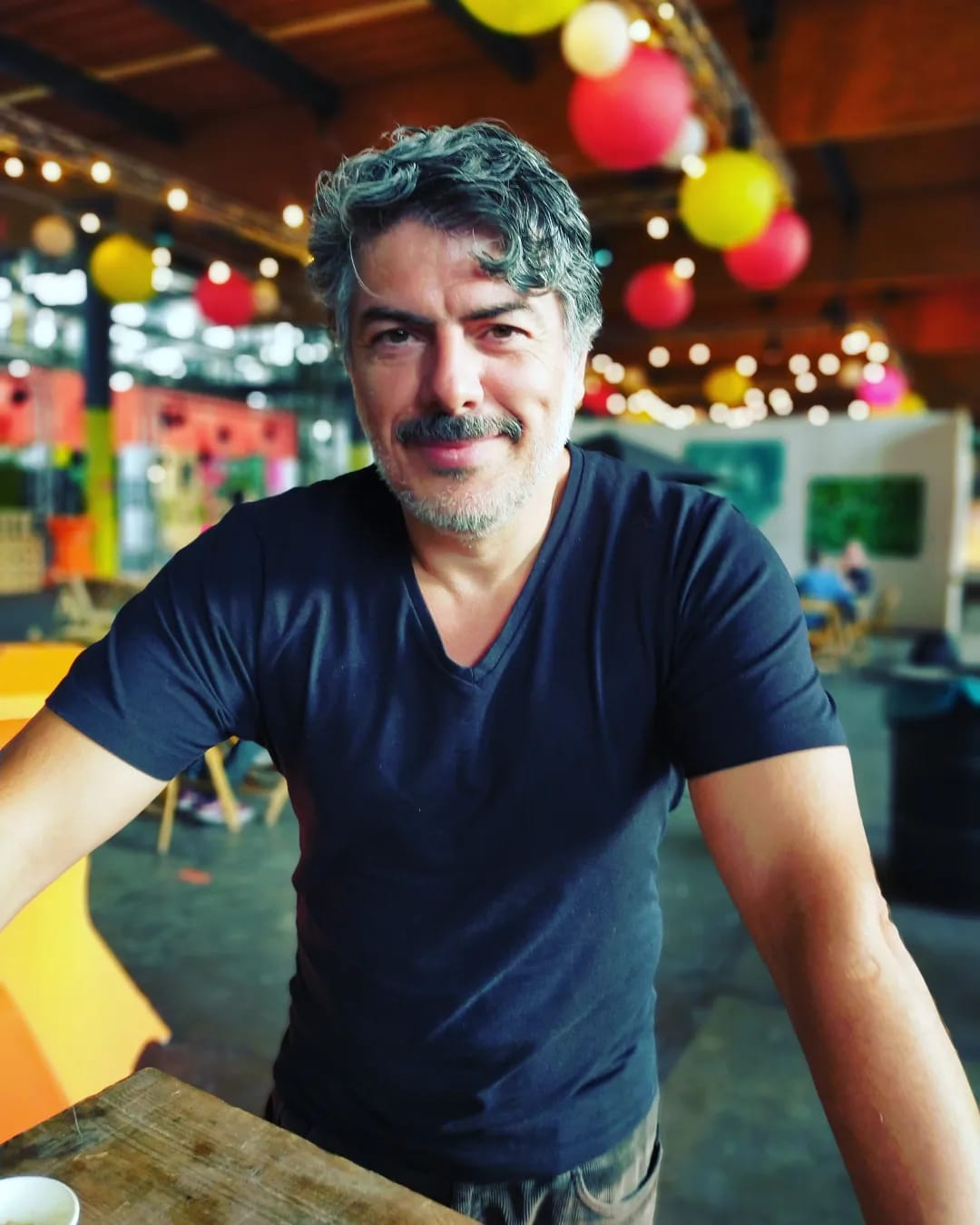
- Born: 1971 (age 54–55); Istanbul
- Education: English language and literature at Istanbul University
- Occupations: Author, journalist

Ali Çimen is a Turkish-Dutch author and journalist.

== Career ==
Born in Istanbul in 1971, Ali Çimen studied English language and literature at Istanbul University and graduated in 1995.

He worked for the international Turkish dailies Zaman (newspaper) and Today's Zaman from 1993 to 2009, serving as reporter, editor, chief of the foreign news desk in İstanbul and as an international correspondent in Frankfurt, Amsterdam, and London. Between 2010 and 2014 he worked for Euronews in France and took a break from journalism in 2015.

He has interviewed many political and social celebrities including Bill Clinton, Shakira, Edwin Buzz Aldrin, Zbigniew Brzezinski, Greg Olsen, Mordechai Vanunu, William S. Cohen, Robert Ballard and Brad Pitt.

He has written numerous books ranging from popular history to secret services and space exploration. His first novel Kırık Heykel (Broken Statue), a political thriller, was published by Timas Publishing Group in 2013.

Çimen graduated from Anadolu University's Department of International Relations in 2021, and completed a master's degree at İstanbul Nişantaşı University in 2025 with a thesis titled "The Birth, Development, and Transformation of German Nationalism from the Middle Ages to the Present." Currently residing in both Turkey and Germany, he continues to write novels and history books.

== Bibliography ==
- AVRUPA TARİHİ (Europe: A History, May 2026, Timaş Yayınları)
- KGB - KREMLİN'İN GÖZLERİ (KGB - The Eyes of Kremlin, April 2022, Timaş Yayınları)
- CIA - BAŞKANIN GÖZLERİ (CIA - The Eyes of the President, February 2020, Timaş Yayınları)
- KISA HİTLER İMPARATORLUĞU TARİHİ (The short history of Hitler Empire, December 2020, Timaş Yayınları)
- KISA ORTADOĞU TARİHİ (The short history of the middle east, April 2016, Timaş Yayınları)
- KISA DÜNYA TARİHİ (The short history of the world, October 2015, Timaş Yayınları)
- TARİHİ DEĞİŞTİREN İCATLAR VE MUCİTLER (The inventions and inventors that changed history, March 2014, Timaş Yayınları)
- TARİHİ DEĞİŞTİREN KEŞİFLER (The discoveries that changed history, August 2013, Timaş Yayınları)
- KIRIK HEYKEL (Broken Statue, March 2013, Timaş Yayınları)
- TARİHİ DEĞİŞTİREN LİDERLER (The leaders who changed history, August 2012, Timaş Yayınları)
- TARİHİ DEĞİŞTİREN GİZLİ SERVİSLER (The secret services that changed history, October 2011, Timaş Yayınları)
- TARİHİ DEĞİŞTİREN GÜNLER (The days that changed history, March 2011, Timaş Yayınları)
- TARİHİ DEĞİŞTİREN DİKTATÖRLER (The dictators who changed history, April 2010, Timaş Yayınları)
- TARİHİ DEĞİŞTİREN İMPARATORLUKLAR (The empires that changed history, June 2009, Timaş Yayınları)
- TARİHİ DEĞİŞTİREN KADINLAR (The women who changed history, May 2008, Timaş Yayınları)
- TARİHİ DEĞİŞTİREN BİLGİNLER (The scientists who changed history, January 2008, Timaş Yayınları)
- TARİHİ DEĞİŞTİREN ASKERLER (The soldiers who changed history, September 2007, Timaş Yayınları)
- TARİHİ DEĞİŞTİREN OLAYLAR (The events that changed history, March 2007, Timaş Yayınları)
- TARİHİ DEĞİŞTİREN SAVAŞLAR (The wars that changed history, November 2006, Timaş Yayınları)
- İNSANOĞLUNUN UZAY MACERASI (The space adventure of mankind, December 2005, Timaş Yayınları)
- TARİHİ DEĞİŞTİREN KONUŞMALAR (The speeches that changed history)(March 2005, Timaş Yayınları)
- ECHELON (Echelon/The backstage of espionage world, May 2003, Timaş Yayınları)
- İPLER KİMİN ELİNDE? (Who is holding ropes?/conspiracy theories, September 2000, Timaş Yayınları)

(English title translations not official)
