= Raks =

Former Turkish electronics manufacturer

- Native name: Raks Elektronik Sanayi ve Ticaret A.S.
- Industry: Manufacturing
- Founded: 1964
- Defunct: 2007
- Headquarters: Istanbul
- Key people: Aslan Önel
- Products: Cassettes, CDs, DVDs
- Subsidiaries: Raks Ev Aletleri; Raks Müzik; Raks Vantilatör

Raks Elektronik Sanayi ve Ticaret A.S. (English: Raks Electronics Industry and Trade Inc.) was a Turkish manufacturer that was engaged in the production of electronic components and storage media, but also worked in the field of telecommunications.

== History ==
Raks was founded in 1964 by Aslan Önel. In the first times it was specialized in the production of audio and video cassettes for both the domestic market and export. The company worked closely with the German chemical company BASF, which supplied magnetic tape for the cassettes.

In 1978 the company established the Raks Ev Aletleri division to produce household appliances and in 1991 registered the Raks Müzik that recorded songs of famous Turkish pop artists recorded, including İbrahim Tatlıses, Serdar Ortaç, Ahmet Kaya and Kerim Tekin.

In 1995 the company began manufacturing laser compact discs at its Manisa plant. Annual production was approximately 3 million CDs, 80 million audio cassettes and 28 million video cassettes. Export revenue for the year amounted to $92 million. By this time BASF had proposed acquiring BASF's entire magnetic media division, which provoked discontent from the German concern's union, and the deal was ultimately abandoned. Despite this Raks continued to produce video and compact cassettes through other companies.

In 2003 Raks created a subsidiary to produce mobile phones. One of Raks's well-known models was the R78 that was a black candybar phone with slightly beveled edges, black external antenna and horizontally elongated monochrome display with a green backlight. It had a 84 grams weight and the 20 millimeters thick plastic. The R78 phone featured a 520 mAh lithium-ion battery that was provided up to two hours of continuous talk time and 200 hours of battery life without recharging. With this Raks successfully competed with other Turkish companies in terms of technological advancement.

Despite this the company experienced hard times. In 1999 as a result of the economic downturn its workforce only 400 worked in this company. In 2007 the company declared bankruptcy. The brand is currently used by Asan Dağıtım and RK Teknoloji, the latter of which produces home appliances under the brand.

== Products ==
=== Compact cassettes ===
- Raks AX
- Raks CD-SX
- Raks CD-X
- Raks Cabrio
- Raks DX
- Raks ED-SX
- Raks ED-X
- Raks HD-X
- Raks HD-X I
- Raks HD-X II
- Raks HDE
- Raks HDF
- Raks High Dynamic
- Raks RX
- Raks SD-SX
- Raks SD-X
- Raks SP Metal
- Raks SP1
- Raks SP2s
- Raks SX
- Raks-N-Roll

=== Video cassettes ===
- Raks AQ
- Raks HCL
- Raks HG
- Raks HG Super Chroma
- Raks PR-S
- Raks SG
- Raks SQ

== Awards ==
In 1999 Aslan Önel was awarded by the ninth President of Turkey Suleyman Demirel for his contribution to the country's economy.
