= Chimán =

- Corregimiento
- Location in Panamá Province#Location in Panama Chimán (Panama)
- Coordinates: 8°43′12″N 78°37′12″W
- Country: Panama
- Province: Panamá
- District: Chimán

Area
  - Land: 281 km^{2} (108 sq mi)

Population (2010)
  - Total: 1,205
  - Density: 4.3/km^{2} (11/sq mi)
- Population density calculated based on land area.
- Time zone: UTC−5 (EST)

Chimán is a town and corregimiento in Chimán District, Panamá Province, Panama with a population of 1,205 as of 2010. It is the seat of Chimán District. Its population as of 1990 was 2,221; its population as of 2000 was 1,334.
