= Derya Çimen =

- Born: Derya Çimen; Turkey
- Height: 1.83 m (6 ft 0 in)
- Beauty pageant titleholder
- Title: Miss Model of the World (runner-up); Miss Model of Turkey 2009 (winner)
- Hair color: Dark Brown
- Eye color: Brown

Derya Çimen is a Turkish model who was runner-up at the Miss Model Of The World 2009 beauty pageant held in China. She also won the mini-award for Best National Costume for a costume designed by Erkan Kara.

Çimen was selected to represent her nation after winning the Miss Model of Turkey pageant in Çeşme. She stands at 183 cm tall and weighs 62 kg.
