= Furkan Kurban =

Dutch-born Turkish footballer

Personal information
- Full name: Furkan Muharrem Kurban
- Date of birth: 2 June 1997 (age 29)
- Place of birth: Amsterdam, The Netherlands
- Height: 1.72 m (5 ft 7 1/2 in)
- Position: Midfielder

Team information
- Current team: Anadolu Selçukspor

Youth career
- DCG Amsterdam
- 2008–2010: AZ Alkmaar
- 2010–2011: AFC Amsterdam
- 2011–2016: Ajax
- 2016–2018: AZ Alkmaar

Senior career*
Years	Team	Apps	(Gls)
2016–2018	Jong AZ	11	(0)
2018–	Anadolu Selçukspor	0	(0)

International career^{‡}
2012	Turkey U16	3	(0)
Medal record
Jong AZ
Winner	Tweede Divisie	2016–17
- * Club domestic league appearances and goals as of 11:44, 2 May 2018 (UTC) ‡ National team caps and goals as of 11:44, 2 May 2018 (UTC)

Furkan Muharrem Kurban (born 2 June 1997) is a Dutch-born, Turkish footballer currently playing as a midfielder for Anadolu Selçukspor.

== Career statistics ==
=== Club ===
As of 2 May 2018.

Club	Season	League			Cup		Continental		Other		Total	
Club	Season	Division	Apps	Goals	Apps	Goals	Apps	Goals	Apps	Goals	Apps	Goals
Jong AZ	2016–17	Tweede Divisie	3	0	0	0	–		0	0	3	0
Jong AZ	2017–18	Eerste Divisie	8	0	0	0	–		0	0	8	0
Jong AZ	Total		11	0	0	0	0	0	0	0	11	0
Anadolu Selçukspor	2018–19	TFF Second League	0	0	0	0	–		0	0	0	0
Career total			11	0	0	0	0	0	0	0	11	0
