= Mark Schnitzer =

American medical academic

- Education: Harvard University; Cambridge University; Princeton University
- Scientific career
- Workplaces: Stanford University

Mark Schnitzer is a Professor jointly in the Biology and Applied Physics departments at Stanford University, an Investigator of the Howard Hughes Medical Institute and is a recipient of a Paul Allen grant. His current research focuses on techniques for imaging individual neurons in vivo, including using fluorescent imaging and highly parallel processing techniques. In 2003, he was named to the MIT Technology Review's "TR100" list of young innovators.
