= Kerim Tekin =

Turkish singer, composer and actor (1975–1998)

- Born: 18 April 1975; Istanbul, Turkey
- Died: 27 June 1998 (aged 23); Sandıklı, Afyonkarahisar, Turkey
- Occupations: Singer; songwriter; composer; actor
- Musical career
- Genres: Pop; pop rock
- Instruments: Vocals, guitar
- Years active: 1994–1998
- Label: Raks Müzik S Müzik
- Website: kerimtekin.com.tr

Kerim Tekin (18 April 1975 – 27 June 1998) was a Turkish singer, songwriter, composer and actor. He became one of the important artists of pop music with the albums he released since the mid-1990s. The artist, who had a career of nearly five years, stood out in the pop music market with the words he wrote and the songs he interpreted.

== Biography ==
Tekin was born on 18 April 1975 in Istanbul, Turkey. Influenced by many artists such as Kayahan, Sezen Aksu, Nilüfer and Fatih Erkoç, Kerim Tekin decided to quit football in 1992 due to his passion for music, with the influence of guitar and singing education, and started his music career. He played guitar and sang in nightclubs and bars as an amateur, and also began to write his own songs. While playing in a nightclub, he was admired by the manager Halis Bütünley and discovered at that time. Kerim Tekin started to create the content of his first album professionally in 1994. He entered the market with his album Kara Gözlüm (1995). With this album, he succeeded in making his voice heard, and his acting career began by appearing in television series during this period. He promoted the album further by appearing on TV programs such as Çık Mutfağımdan, Şahane Cumartesi, Laf Lafı Açıyor, 7'den 77'ye, Huysuz Show, İner Misin? Çıkar Mısın? and Erol Evgin Show When he changed his style and image with his second album, Haykırsam Dünyaya (1997), he started to appeal to large audiences. Kerim Tekin, who started writing lyrics with this album, worked with musicians such as Kenan Doğulu, Ozan Doğulu, Garo Mafyan, Zeynep Talu, Şehrazat, Ozan Çolakoğlu, İskender Paydaş, Feyyaz Kuruş and Tayfun Duygulu.

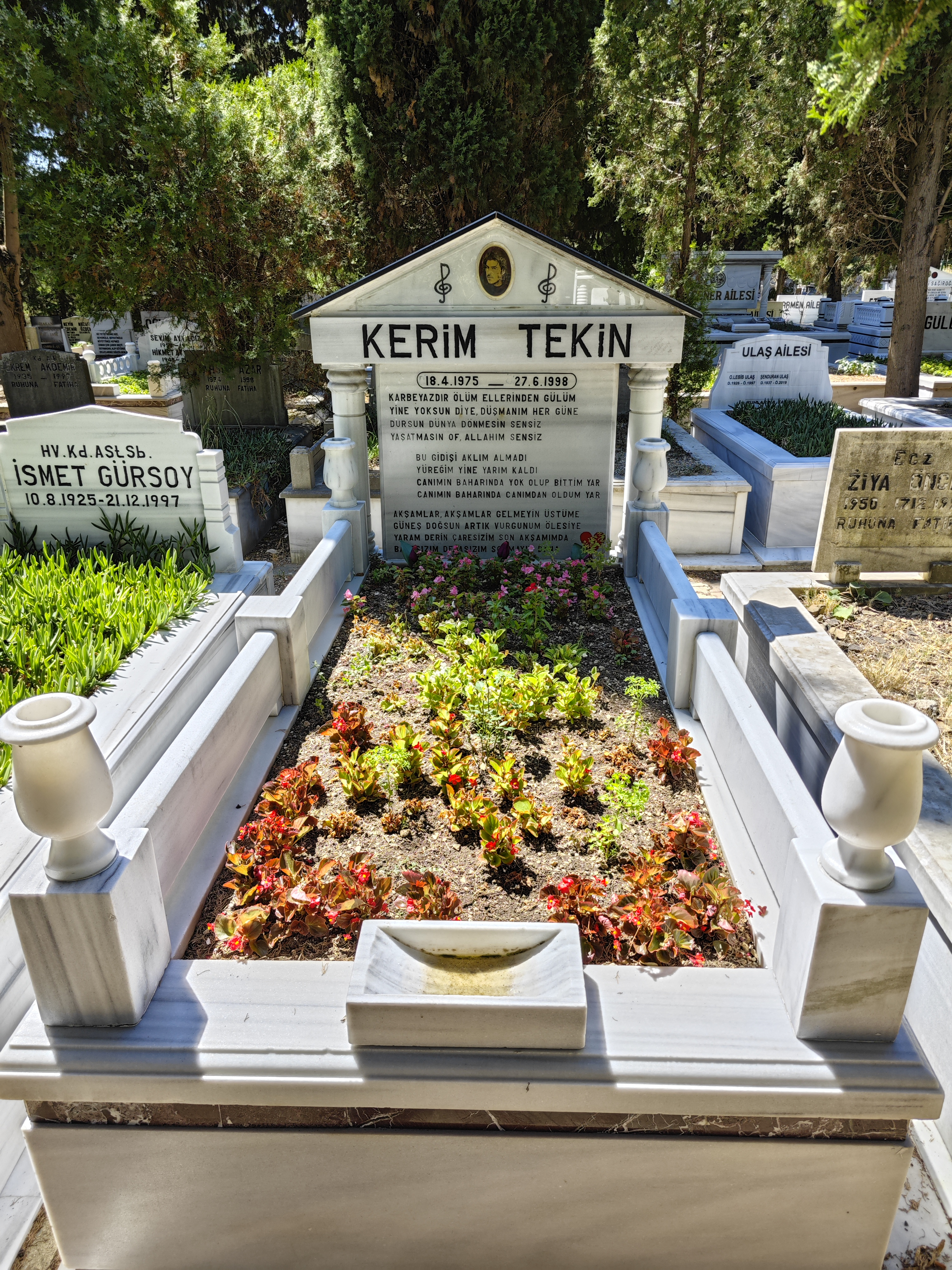
Tekin's grave at Zincirlikuyu Cemetery

Tekin, who was nominated for many important awards such as the Kral Turkey Music Awards and the Golden Butterfly Awards at a young age, went to the festival held in Afyon on 26 June 1998, with many artists. Tekin, who appeared on the stage as the last artist at the festival, died in a traffic accident on 27 June in Sandıklı, while leaving the festival early with his manager Halis Bütünley and returning to Istanbul. His songs were sung again by many artists after his death.

== Discography ==
Studio albums

Album	Album info	Sales and certifications
Kara Gözlüm	Released: 25 December 1995; Label: Raks Müzik and S Müzik; Format: Cassette, CD, digital download	500,000
Haykırsam Dünyaya	Released: 10 July 1997; Label: Raks Müzik and S Müzik; Format: Cassette, CD, digital download	1,150,000

== Filmography ==
Year	Title	Role	Director	Notes
1996–1997	Mirasyediler	Teoman Çelik	Rabahat Baltacı, Osman F. Seden	
1998	Yaz Aşkım	Kerim	Cem Akyoldaş	
1998	Karbeyaz	Kemal	Oğuz Gözen	

== Awards ==
Year	Award	Category	Album	Result
1998	4th Kral TV Video Music Awards	Best Male Pop Music Artist	Haykırsam Dünyaya	Nominated
1998	25th Golden Butterfly Awards	Best Male Pop Music Artist	Haykırsam Dünyaya	Nominated
1999	Turkish Air Force Academy	Most Liked Pop Artist of the Year	Haykırsam Dünyaya	Won
