= Furkan Alakmak =

Dutch-Turkish footballer (born 1991)

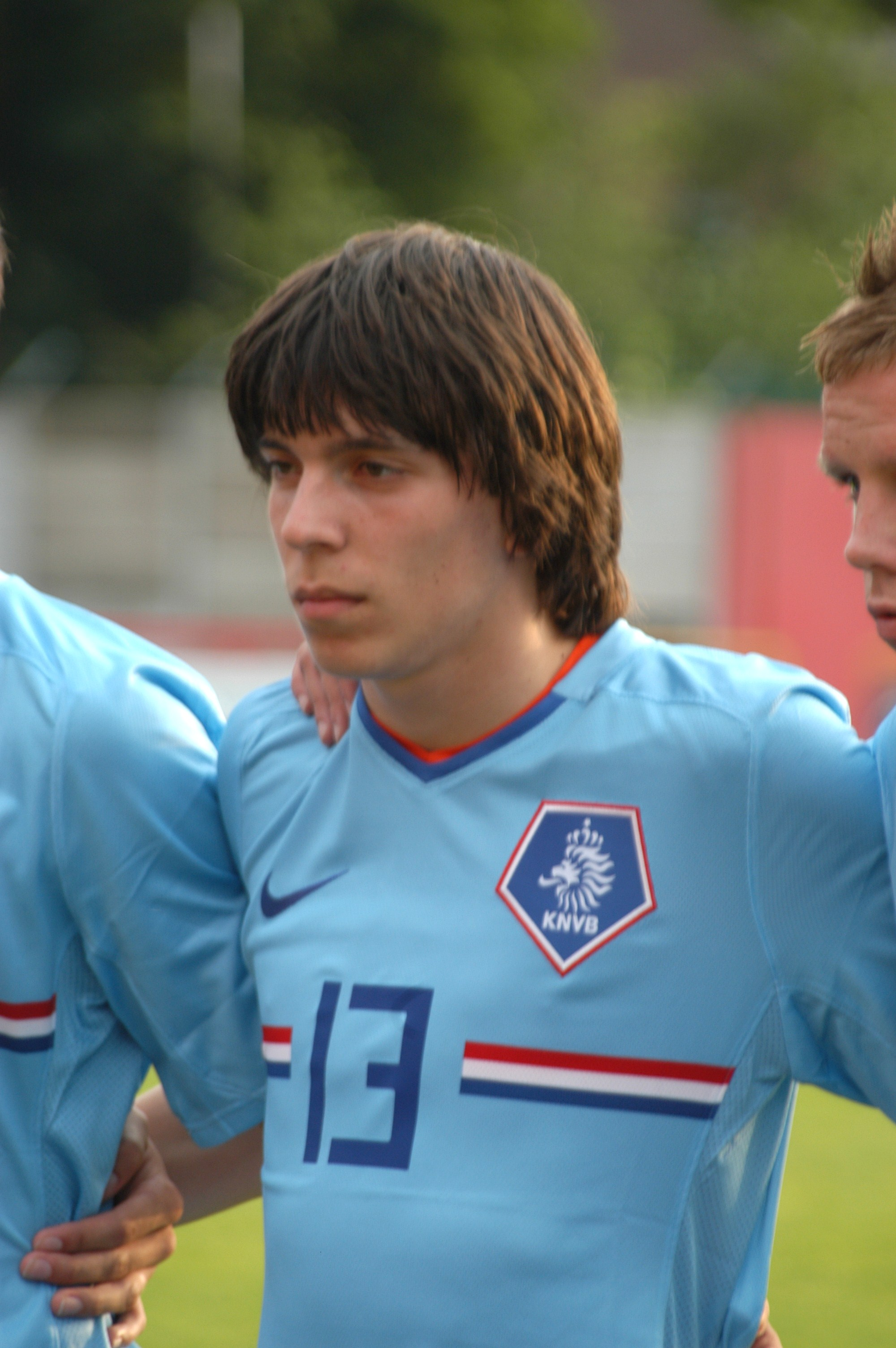

Personal information
- Full name: Furkan Alakmak
- Date of birth: 28 September 1991 (age 35)
- Place of birth: Oss, Netherlands
- Height: 1.77 m (5 ft 10 in)
- Position: Winger

Team information
- Current team: RKSV Cito

Youth career
- Oss '20
- 2008–2010: NEC

Senior career*
Years	Team	Apps	(Gls)
2010–2011	NEC	0	(0)
2011–2013	RKC Waalwijk	16	(1)
2012–2013	→ Eindhoven (loan)	21	(0)
2013–2015	Göztepe	26	(3)
2016	OJC Rosmalen	14	(0)
2017–2019	JVC Cuijk	36	(10)
2019–2020	DFS		
2020–2023	Woezik		
2023–	RKSV Cito		
- * Club domestic league appearances and goals as of 25 October 2020

Furkan Alakmak (born 28 September 1991) is a Dutch-Turkish footballer who plays as a winger for RKSV Cito.

== Club career ==
He played in the Netherlands for NEC, RKC Waalwijk and FC Eindhoven, before moving to Turkey to play for second division side Göztepe. In 2015 his contract was cancelled by mutual consent and returned to the Netherlands and joined amateur side OJC Rosmalen in January 2016.
