= Alexandra Cristin =

American model

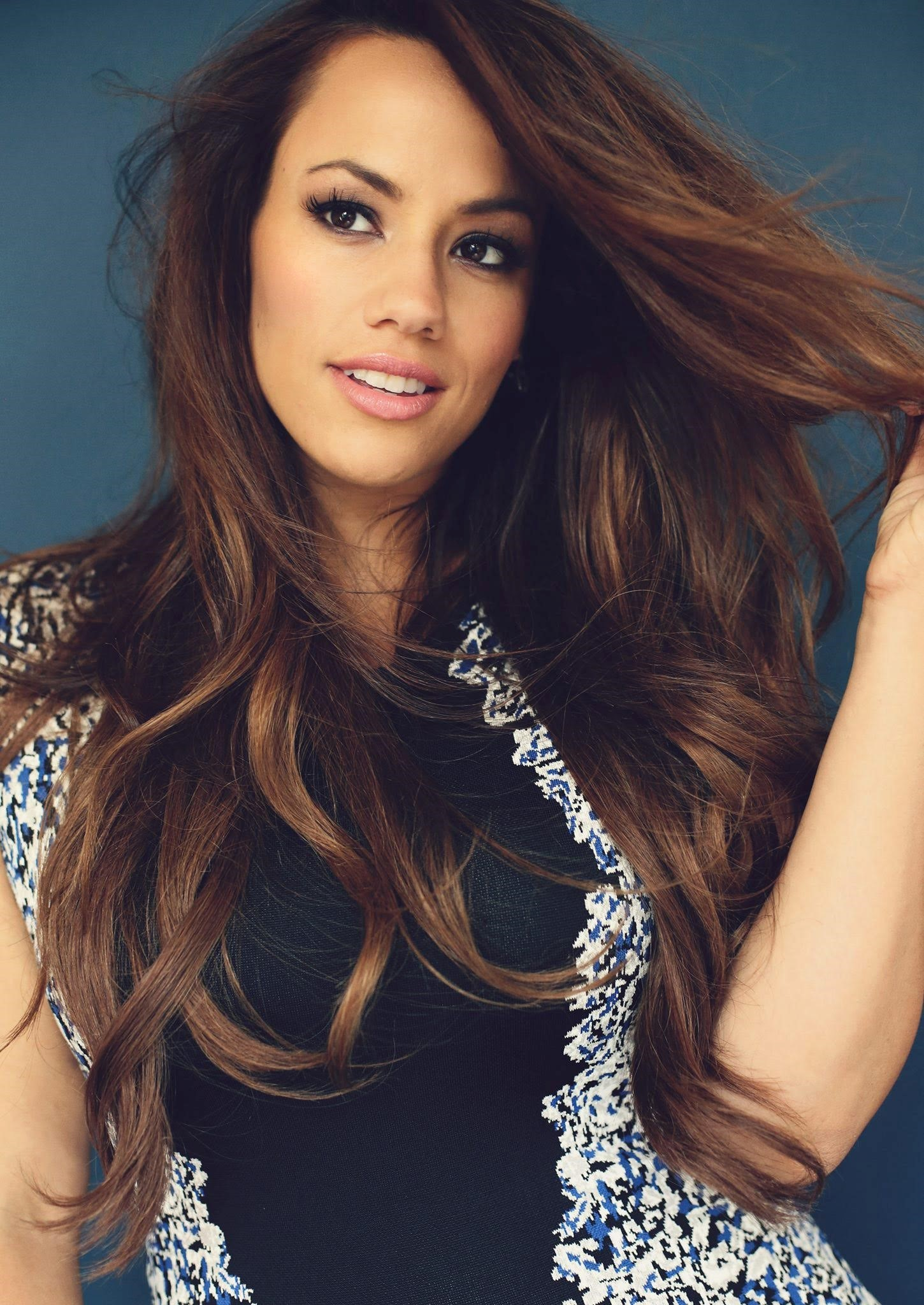
- Born: April 12, 1989 (age 37); Harrisburg, Pennsylvania, U.S.
- Occupations: Entrepreneur, model, television personality
- Years active: 2009 - present
- Website: selfmadebossbabes.com

Alexandra Cristin (born April 12, 1989) is an American entrepreneur and philanthropist based in Los Angeles, California. She is the founder and former chief executive officer of Glam Seamless, a hair-extension company established in 2012 and acquired by Beauty Industry Group in February 2019.

By 2022, Glam Seamless had generated more than $100 million in cumulative revenue. In 2025, she was included in Inc. magazine's Female Founders 500 list for her business career and philanthropic activities.

== Early life and education ==
Cristin was born in Harrisburg, Pennsylvania, and was raised by a single mother. At the age of nine, she began attending the Milton Hershey School, a boarding school in Hershey, Pennsylvania.

She moved to New York City to study business at Pace University. She graduated from Pace University in 2011 with a degree in business management.

== Career ==
Cristin worked as a plus-size model and made appearances on reality television programs.

In 2012, Cristin founded Glam Seamless, an e-commerce company specializing in hair extensions. The business initially operated from her apartment in New Jersey. According to accounts published by Glamour and Beauty Independent, she started the company with approximately $1,500 of her own savings.

On February 25, 2019, Beauty Industry Group announced its acquisition of Glam Seamless.

In August 2022, Glamour featured Cristin in its Millionaire Moves video series. During the interview, she described building Glam Seamless from a $1,500 investment into a business that had generated more than $100 million in cumulative revenue over the preceding decade.

In February 2023, Beauty Independent reported that Cristin was stepping down as chief executive officer of Glam Seamless after more than a decade with the business.

Cristin founded OnePress Hair Extensions, a business developing removable hair-extension products for professional salon use. Patent applications relating to hair-extension attachment systems were published in September 2025 and February 2026 under the title Systems and Methods for Hair Extensions.

In 2021, Glam Seamless was ranked No. 1,856 on the Inc. 5000 list of rapidly growing privately held companies in the United States.

In 2021, Cristin established the Alexandra Cristin Foundation. In February 2021, she announced a self-funded $100,000 Women's Fund, intended to provide business grants, scholarships, and mentoring assistance to women.

In 2025, Inc. included Cristin in its Female Founders 500 list.

== Recognition ==
- 2017 Inc. magazine's 30 Under 30 recognition associated with Glam Seamless.
- 2020 Entrepreneur magazine's second annual 100 Powerful Women list.
- 2025 Inc. magazine's Female Founders 500 list.
