= Grand Challenges =

Difficult but important problems used as institutional focuses

Grand Challenges are difficult but important problems set by various institutions or professions to encourage solutions or advocate for the application of government or philanthropic funds especially in the most highly developed economies and

... energize not only the scientific and engineering community, but also students, journalists, the public, and their elected representatives, to develop a sense of the possibilities, an appreciation of the risks, and an urgent commitment to accelerate progress.

Grand challenges are more than ordinary research questions or priorities, they are end results or outcomes that are global in scale; very difficult to accomplish, yet offer hope of being ultimately tractable; demand an extensive number of research projects across many technical and non-technical disciplines and accompanied by well-defined metrics. Lastly, Grand challenges "require coordinated, collaborative, and collective efforts" and must capture "the popular imagination, and thus political support."

== In engineering ==
- Grand Challenges: A Strategic Plan for Bridge Engineering, initiative sponsored by the Highway Subcommittee on Bridges and Structures (HSCOBS) of the American Association of State Highway and Transportation Officials (AASHTO) started in 2000.
- Grand Challenges for Engineering, initiative sponsored by the National Academy of Engineering (NAE) for engineering problems in the next century.
  - Global Grand Challenges, summit meetings sponsored by The National Academy of Engineering of the United States, The Royal Academy of Engineering of the United Kingdom, and the Chinese Academy of Engineering.
  - ASCE Grand Challenge for Civil Engineering, initiative by the American Society of Civil Engineering's (ASCE) to enhance significantly the performance and life-cycle value of infrastructure by 2025.
- Grand Challenges for Disaster Reduction, initiative sponsored by the National Science and Technology Council, Committee on Environment and Natural Resources.

== In government and military ==
- DARPA Grand Challenge, initiative to develop technologies needed to create fully autonomous ground vehicles, capable of completing a substantial off-road course within a limited time.
  - DARPA Urban Challenge, part of DARPA's Grand Challenge but for urban areas.
- DARPA Cyber Grand Challenge, initiative to create automatic defensive systems capable of reasoning about software flaws, formulating patches and deploying them on a network in real time.
- H-Prize, initiative sponsored by the US Department of Energy (DOE) to promote use of hydrogen as an energy carrier.
- High-performance computing initiative sponsored by the Office of Science and Technology Policy in the United States in the 1980s.

== In mathematics education ==
- Grand Challenges and Opportunities in Mathematics Education Research, initiative sponsored by National Council of Teachers of Mathematics (NCTM) Research Conference in 2014.

== In medicine and health ==
- NSF Report on Grand Challenges of Mind and Brain (2006)
  - BRAIN Initiative (Brain Research through Advancing Innovative Neurotechnologies), supporting the development and application of technologies to understand human brain function.
- Grand Challenges in Global Health, research initiative launched by the Bill & Melinda Gates Foundation.
  - Grand Challenges Canada, initiative supported by the Canadian government based upon the Grand Challenges in Global Health to develop solutions to critical health and development challenges in the developing world.
  - Grand Challenges in Continued Vector Research by the Foundation for the National Institutes of Health combatting mosquito-borne disease.

== In science and technology ==
- Grand Challenges and Great Opportunities initiative sponsored by American Association for the Advancement of Science for the special 125th anniversary issue of Science on “What Don’t We Know?” (2006).
- Grand challenges for GIScience, initiative sponsored by Association of American Geographers (AAG) in conjunction with the University Consortium for Geographic Information Science (UCGIS).
- Centennial Challenges, initiative sponsored by NASA for technology achievements by American teams.
  - Elevator:2010, initiative sponsored in part by NASA for the purpose of developing space elevator and space elevator-related technologies.
- Environmental Grand Challenges, initiative by the National Research Council (NRC) about the most important and challenging scientific questions in the environmental sciences.
- XChallenge, non-profit organization that designs and manages public competitions intended to encourage technological developments.

== In other subjects ==
- Grand Challenges for Social Work, initiative spearheaded by the American Academy of Social Work and Social Welfare.
- Grand Challenges, Global Health, Sustainable Cities, Intercultural Interaction and Human Well-being, initiative by University College London to develop cross-disciplinary collaborations related to matters of pressing societal concern.
- In management and organization studies, an important research agenda has evolved around Grand Challenges. However, it is being criticized.

== U.S. national computing research ==
=== 1980s ===
The presidential Office of Science and Technology Policy in the United States set a first list of grand challenges in the late 1980s, to direct research funding for high-performance computing. A grand challenge is a fundamental problem in science or engineering, with broad applications, whose solution would be enabled by the application of high performance computing resources that could become available in the near future. Examples of these grand challenges were said to be:

- Computational fluid dynamics for
  - the design of hypersonic aircraft, efficient automobile bodies, and extremely quiet submarines
  - weather forecasting for short- and long-term effects
  - efficient recovery of oil, and for many other applications
- Electronic structure calculations for the design of new materials such as
  - chemical catalysts
  - immunological agents
  - superconductors
- Plasma dynamics for fusion energy technology and for safe and efficient military technology
- Calculations to understand the fundamental nature of matter, including quantum chromodynamics and condensed matter theory
- Symbolic computations including
  - speech recognition
  - computer vision
  - natural language understanding
  - automated reasoning
  - tools for design, manufacturing, and simulation of complex systems

This was partially in response to the Japanese 5th Generation (or Next Generation) 10-year project.

The list envisioned using high-performance computing to improve understanding and solve problems in:

- Prediction of weather, climate, and global change
- Challenges in materials sciences
- Semiconductor design
- Superconductivity
- Structural biology
- Design of pharmaceutical drugs
- Human genome
- Quantum chromodynamics
- Astronomy
- Challenges in Transportation
- Vehicle Signature
- Turbulence
- Vehicle dynamics
- Nuclear fusion
- Efficiency of combustion systems
- Enhanced oil and gas recovery
- Computational ocean sciences
- Speech
- Vision
- Undersea surveillance for anti-submarine warfare

=== 2000s ===
The National Science Foundation updated its list of grand challenges, removing largely completed challenges such as the Human Genome Project, and adding new challenges such as better prediction of climate change, carbon dioxide sequestration, tree of life genetics, understanding biological systems, virtual product design, cancer detection and therapy, and modeling of hazards (such as hurricanes, tornadoes, earthquakes, wildfires, and chemical accidents), and gamma ray bursts. In addition to funding high-performance computing hardware, the NSF proposed to fund research on computational algorithms and methods, software development methods, data visualization, education, and workforce development.

== See also ==
- Framework Programmes for Research and Technological Development, a series of research programmes in the EU
- Inducement prize contest
