= Turkish American Neuropsychiatric Association =

Turkish American Neuropsychiatric Association (TANPA) is a non-profit non-governmental organization founded in 1981 by Erol Ucer. Its stated goal is addressing neuropsychiatric diseases within cooperation of Turkish and American scientists.
