= Furkan Tarhan =

Turkish businessman

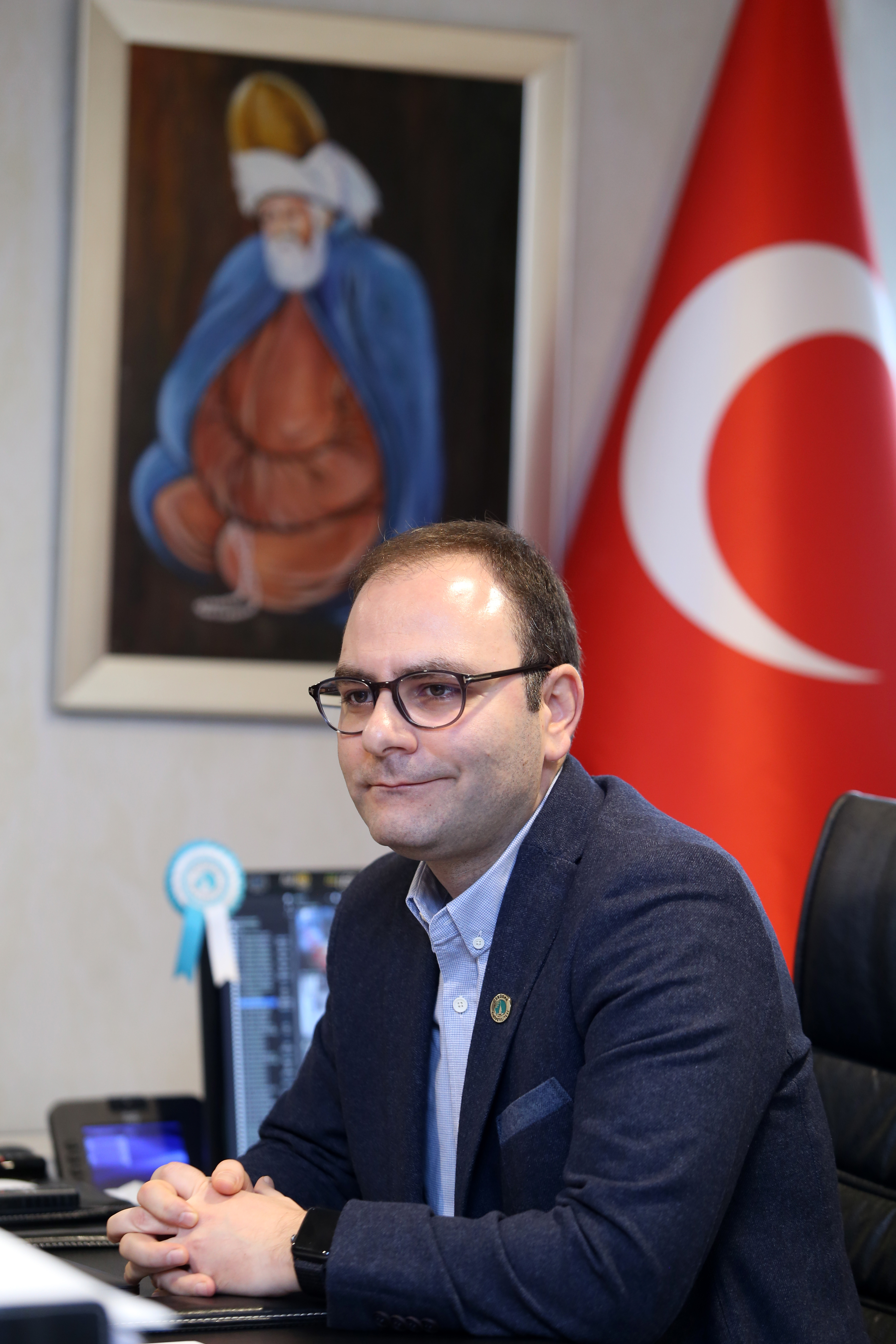
- Occupations: Uskudar University, Chairman of Board of Trustees

Ahmet Furkan Tarhan is a businessman in Turkey. He is the chairman of the board of trustees for Üsküdar University and administrative director of the Npistanbul Neuropsychiatry Hospital. He is also board member of Union of Foundation Universities in Turkey (VUB).
