= Chimán District =

Chimán
- District

- Location of the district capital in Panama
- Coordinates: 8°43′12″N 78°37′12″W
- Country: Panama
- Province: Panamá
- Capital: Chimán

Area
  - Total: 1,046 km^{2} (404 sq mi)

Population (2019)
  - Total: 3,531
  - Density: 3.376/km^{2} (8.743/sq mi)
- official estimate
- Time zone: UTC-5 (ETZ)

Chimán is a district (distrito) of Panamá Province in Panama. The population according to the 2000 census was 4,086; the latest official estimate (for 2019) is 3,531. The district covers a total area of 1,046 km^{2} (404 sq mi). The capital lies at the town of Chimán.

== Administrative divisions ==
Chimán District is divided administratively into the following corregimientos:

- Chimán (capital)
- Brujas
- Gonzalo Vásquez
- Pásiga
- Unión Santeña
