= Çınar Tarhan =

Turkish footballer

Personal information
- Date of birth: 20 May 1997 (age 29)
- Place of birth: Beykoz, Turkey
- Height: 1.75 m (5 ft 9 in)
- Position: Midfielder

Team information
- Current team: Şanlıurfaspor
- Number: 23

Youth career
- 2007–2009: Marmara Üniversitesi Spor Kulübü
- 2009–2012: Beşiktaş
- 2012: Hürriyet Gücü
- 2012–2014: Galatasaray
- 2014–2017: Kardemir Karabükspor

Senior career*
Years	Team	Apps	(Gls)
2016–2017	Kardemir Karabükspor	1	(0)
2017	→ Sarıyer (loan)	8	(0)
2017–2018	Ankara Demirspor	33	(4)
2018–2021	Çaykur Rizespor	1	(0)
2019	→ Etimesgut Belediyespor (loan)	10	(0)
2020–2021	→ Ergene Velimeşe (loan)	40	(3)
2021–2022	Serik Belediyespor	37	(2)
2022–2023	Düzcespor	34	(0)
2023–2024	24 Erzincanspor	33	(10)
2024–2025	Kastamonuspor 1966	31	(6)
2025–	Şanlıurfaspor	14	(2)
- * Club domestic league appearances and goals as of 30 November 2025

Çınar Tarhan (born 20 May 1997) is a Turkish footballer who plays as a midfielder for TFF 2. Lig club Şanlıurfaspor.

== Career statistics ==
=== Club ===
As of 14 December 2018.

Club	Season	League			Cup		Continental		Other		Total	
Club	Season	Division	Apps	Goals	Apps	Goals	Apps	Goals	Apps	Goals	Apps	Goals
Kardemir Karabükspor	2016–17	Süper Lig	1	0	1 (Note: Appearance in the Turkish Cup)	0	0	0	–		2	0
Sarıyer (loan)	2016–17	TFF Second League	8	0	0	0	0	0	–		8	0
Ankara Demirspor	2017–18	TFF Third League	33	4	3	0	0	0	–		36	4
Çaykur Rizespor	2018–19	Süper Lig	0	0	0	0	0	0	–		0	0
Total			42	4	4	0	0	0	0	0	46	4
