= Timas Publishing Group =

Timaş Yayınları
- Company type: Private
- Industry: Media
- Founded: 1982
- Headquarters: Istanbul, Turkey
- Website: www.timaspublishing.com

Timas Publishing Group (Turkish: Timaş Yayınları) is a publishing group based in Istanbul, Turkey. It includes several publishers: Sufi Book, Leyla and Mecnun Publishing (L&M), Carpe Diem Publishing and Antik Classics. It is a member of the Turkish Publishers Association.
