= Geoffrey Ling =

American doctor and researcher

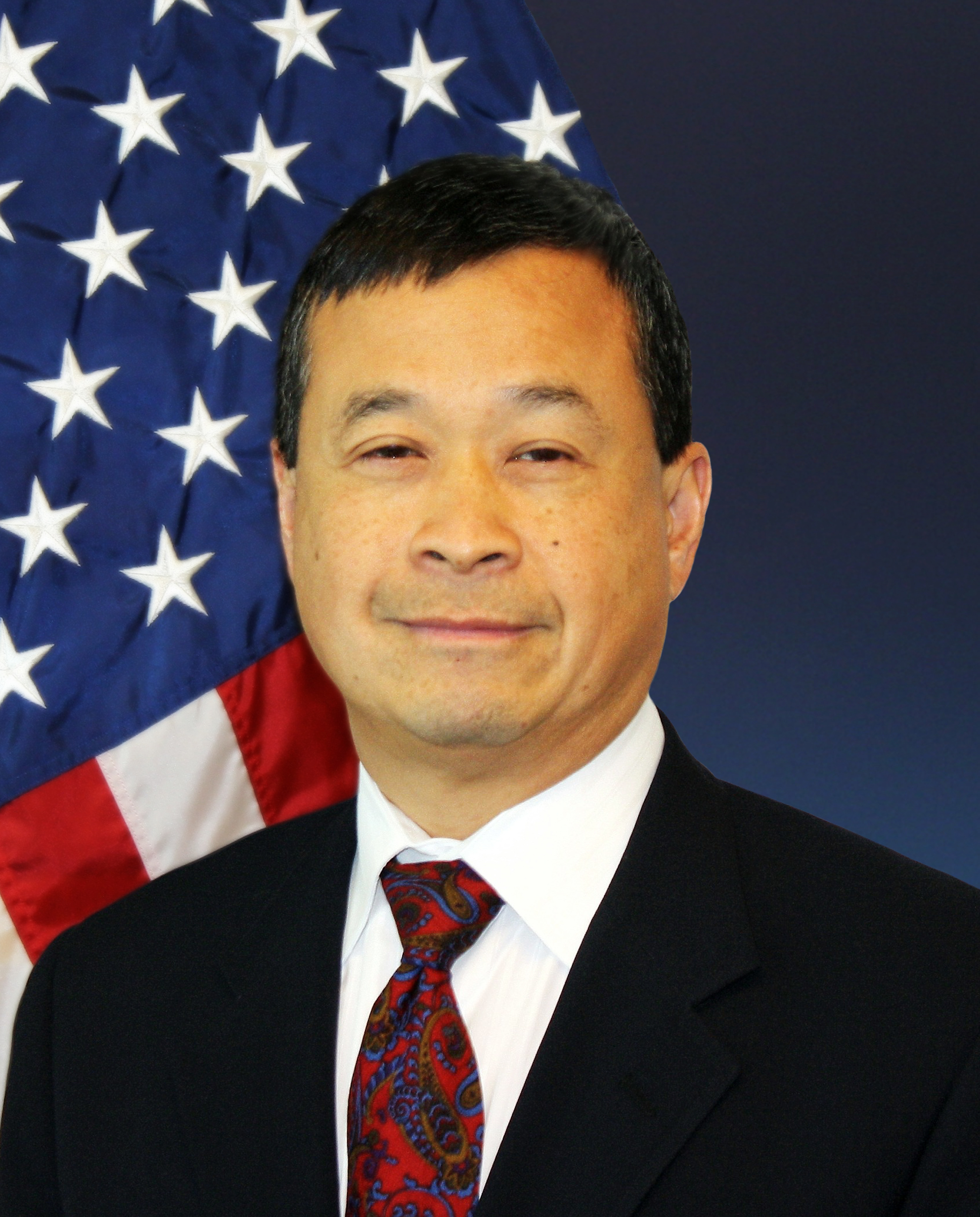
- Born: Baltimore, Maryland
- Education: Washington University in St. Louis; Cornell University; Georgetown University
- Military career
- Allegiance: United States of America
- Branch: United States Army
- Service years: 1985-2012
- Rank: Colonel
- Conflicts: War in Afghanistan (2003), Iraq War (2005)

Geoffrey S. F. Ling is a medical doctor who retired from the United States Army as a colonel and was the CEO of On Demand Pharmaceuticals. He served as the founding director of the Defense Advanced Research Projects Agency (DARPA) Biological Technologies Office from 2014 until 2016. He was considered to be the "US Army's premier subject matter expert on traumatic brain injury (TBI)", and was for years the only neuro-intensive care specialist in the US military.

Prominent in his DARPA research portfolio are Preventing Violent Explosive Neuro Trauma (PREVENT), prevention of explosive blast traumatic brain injury, Revolutionizing Prostheses (RP), development of responsive, brain-controlled, artificial arms, Predicting Health and Disease (PHD), combination of biomarkers and advanced analytics to diagnosis of disease in the presymptomatic state and Battlefield Medicine, development of point-of-care drug manufacturing technology. He also served as a Program Manager and following, the deputy director of the Defense Sciences Office. Ling is recipient of the Department of Defense Medal for Distinguished Public Service, Legion of Merit, Alpha Omega Alpha, Sigma Xi and the Humanitarian Award from the Brain Mapping Foundation.

On May 21, 2018, HARPA (Health Advanced Research Projects Agency) was first publicly proposed on Fox Business News by Bob Wright and Geoff Ling . In April 2020, Ling co-wrote with Michael Stebbins the proposal for the creation this new federal agency modeled on DARPA, but focused on health. That proposal was adopted by then former Vice-President Biden's presidential campaign and published on line as part of the Day One Project. It became the model used to establish the Advanced Research Projects Agency for Health (ARPA-H).

== Personal ==
Ling was born in Baltimore, MD to Alfred Ling, M.D, Ph.D. and Helen M. Ling, M.S. His father was a professor at Rockefeller University and a pharmaceutical executive. His mother was an aerospace engineer who worked on the U.S. space program. He is married to Shari Ling, M.D., the national Deputy Chief Medical Officer of the Centers for Medicare and Medicaid Services (CMS).

== Education ==
Ling graduated from Stuyvesant High School in New York City. He earned his BA from Washington University in St. Louis, and earned his Ph.D. in pharmacology from Cornell University Graduate School of Medical Sciences (1982). He completed post doctoral training in Neuropharmacology at the Memorial Sloan Kettering Cancer Center (1982-1985). In 1989, Ling earned an M.D. from Georgetown University School of Medicine. Both his neurology internship (1989-1990) and later residency (1990-1993) were completed at Walter Reed Army Medical Center. From 1993 to 1995 Ling had a clinical fellowship at Johns Hopkins Hospital, Neurosciences Critical Care Unit. At Cornell and Sloan-Kettering, he did opioid research.

== Professional history ==
=== Military ===
Ling completed two war deployments as a neurointensive care physician: Afghanistan (2003) and Iraq (2005), as well as four "Gray Team" missions to study combat brain injuries. His medical studies of the war in Afghanistan and Iraq show that over 50% of those who died of wounds had head injuries.

Prior to his position as the founding Director of the Biological Technologies Office at DARPA, Ling was Professor and Acting Chair of the Department of Neurology at the Uniformed Services University of the Health Sciences (USUHS). He has been on the USUHS faculty since 1995 and is now Emeritus Professor. For many years, he was the Army's only neuro-intensive care physician. Ling is also Professor of Neurology and Anesthesiology & Critical Care Medicine at Johns Hopkins Hospital. Ling served as an Army doctor for 27 years, and retired in 2012. Ling and his work have been featured twice on the TV show 60 Minutes, in 2009 and 2012.

=== Other ===
Ling is Professor of Neurology, Neurosurgery and Anesthesiology & Critical Care Medicine at Johns Hopkins Hospital and is a member of the neurosciences critical care unit (NCCU) clinical faculty. Ling and his work have been featured twice on the TV show 60 Minutes, in 2009 and 2012. He was also one of the doctors who treated American Congresswoman Gabby Giffords after she had been shot in the head. Ling's publications include over 200 peer-reviewed journal articles, research reviews, and book chapters

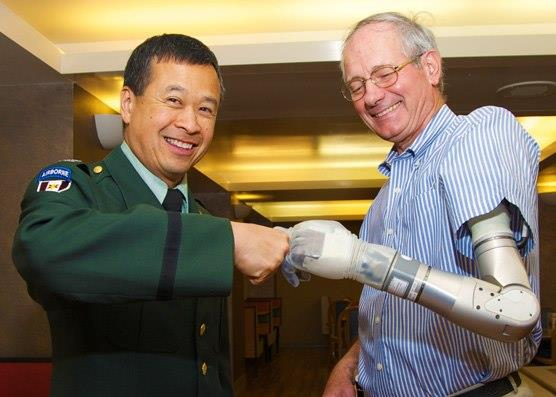
Dr. Ling doing the fist bump with an artificial arm patient.

== Prosthetic arm development ==
Because of engineering and medical concerns, arm replacement is more difficult than leg replacement. Arm replacement technology was far behind leg replacement technology when DARPA began the Revolutionizing Prosthetics team in 2006. In May 2014, the US Food and Drug Administration approved the first of the two prosthetic arms developed under that program. Earlier in 2014, DARPA's Biological Technologies Office announced the launch of a new Hand Proprioception and Touch Interfaces (HAPTIX) program, which aims to deliver naturalistic sensations to amputees and, in the process, enable intuitive, dexterous control of advanced prosthetic devices; provide the psychological benefit of improving prosthesis "embodiment"; and reduce phantom limb pain. Ling has described the problem of developing a high quality artificial arm as "doggone hard". Ling's Revolutionizing Prosthetics team's work could lead to the restoration of sight and hearing. Using his artificial arms, amputees could precisely move their artificial arms with just thought.

== Awards ==
Ling is board certified in both neurology and neurocritical care. Ling was an "A" designated Army neurologist and is a recipient of the Order of Military Medical Merit. In Toronto, Canada, in 2012, Ling was awarded the Humanitarian Award from the Brain Mapping Foundation. He is a Fellow of the American Neurological Association, American Academy of Neurology and the Neurocritical Care Society. Named DARPA Program Manager of the Year (2008), Cornell University Alumnus of the Year (2008) and Washington University Distinguished Alumnus (2015). Is member of Alpha Omega Alpha and Sigma Xi. In 2016, he received the Department of Defense Medal for Distinguished Public Service. In 2022, he was conferred an honorary Doctor of Science (DSc) by the Elmezzi Graduate School of Molecular Medicine.
