= Çimən =

- Location within Azerbaijan Location within Karabakh Economic Region
- Coordinates: 39°34′N 47°06′E
- Country: Azerbaijan
- District: Fuzuli
- Time zone: UTC+4 (AZT)

Çimən (also, Chiman and Chemen) is a village in the Fuzuli District of Azerbaijan. The village was occupied by Armenian forces during the First Nagorno-Karabakh War but was recaptured by Azerbaijan on 17 October 2020.
