= Npistanbul Brain Hospital =

NPİSTANBUL Brain Hospital
- NP GRUP

Geography
- Location: Yamanevler Mahallesi Ahmet Tevfik İleri Caddesi No:18, Ümraniye, Istanbul, Turkey
- Coordinates: 41.0289°N 29.1141°E

Organisation
- Type: Private specialty hospital
- Affiliated university: Üsküdar University

Services
- Emergency department: Neuropsychiatric and Psychiatric Ambulance
- Beds: 160

History
- Founded: March 20, 2007

Links
- Website: www.npistanbul.com/en

NPİSTANBUL Brain Hospital (NPİSTANBUL or NPI) is a private neuropsychiatric hospital located in Ümraniye, Istanbul, Turkey. Established on 20 March 2007, it is considered the first dedicated neuropsychiatric specialty hospital in Turkey. The hospital operates within the NP GRUP organisation and holds an academic affiliation with Üsküdar University, with which it collaborates on clinical education and research.

With a capacity of 160 beds, NPİSTANBUL provides multidisciplinary services in psychiatry, neurology, psychology, and addiction medicine, in addition to general medical branches. In 2024, the hospital received Joint Commission International (JCI) accreditation for the fifth consecutive time.

== History ==
=== Background and founding philosophy ===
The intellectual foundation of NPİSTANBUL lies in the convergence of three historically separate disciplines: neurology, psychiatry, and psychology. During the early twentieth century, dynamic explanatory models in psychology influenced psychiatry, while neurology shifted toward reflexology and moved away from direct study of the brain, creating an artificial separation that persisted for approximately seventy years. The subsequent development of neuroimaging techniques in the latter decades of the twentieth century created renewed common ground between the fields, with the brain becoming a shared focus of all three disciplines.

In Turkey, this convergence found institutional expression through NP GRUP, which sought to provide an integrated clinical and research environment for neurology, psychiatry, and psychology working in concert.

=== Memory Center of Istanbul (1999–2007) ===
A significant precursor to the hospital was the establishment of the Memory Center of Istanbul, the Turkish branch of Memory Centers of America. Its formal opening took place on 25 May 1999 and was attended by Turkey's 9th President, Süleyman Demirel. The centre focused on memory disorders and neurocognitive research, and was founded with the involvement of Professor Nevzat Tarhan, Professor Oğuz Tanrıdağ, and Professor Turan İtil.

On 27 October 2000, President Demirel was presented with a "Strong Memory Award" by Memory Centers of America at a ceremony held at the Dedeman Hotel in Ankara. During the same event, thirteen academics were recognised with plaques for their contributions to neuropsychiatry. Attendees included the Rector of Hacettepe University and representatives from the Gülhane Military Medical Academy (GATA).

=== Establishment of NPİSTANBUL (2007) ===
NPİSTANBUL Brain Hospital was formally inaugurated on 20 March 2007, with the attendance of Parliament Speaker Bülent Arınç. It was established as a full-service specialty hospital dedicated to brain health, the first of its kind in Turkey.

=== Expansion and academic integration ===
In the years following its founding, the hospital expanded its clinical offering to include general medical branches alongside its core neuropsychiatric specialties. A key development in the hospital's academic dimension came with the establishment of Üsküdar University's Faculty of Medicine, which admitted its first cohort of students in the 2019–2020 academic year. NPİSTANBUL serves as a clinical training platform for the faculty, combining academic instruction with hands-on clinical experience.

== Academic affiliation ==
NPİSTANBUL maintains a formal academic partnership with Üsküdar University (Turkish: Üsküdar Üniversitesi), a private university located in Istanbul. The collaboration encompasses clinical training, joint research initiatives, and the integration of hospital-based practice into the university's medical curriculum. Hospital physicians and researchers contribute to academic programmes, and the Faculty of Medicine's students undertake placements at the hospital as part of their training.

== Clinical services ==
The hospital provides services across the following primary specialties:

- Psychiatry
- Neurology
- Psychology and Psychotherapy
- Addiction Medicine
- Behavioural Neurology

In addition to these core neuropsychiatric disciplines, NPİSTANBUL also encompasses general medical branches, operating as a comprehensive diagnostic and treatment centre. The hospital's emergency services include a dedicated Neuropsychiatric and Psychiatric Ambulance.

== Accreditation ==
NPİSTANBUL has been accredited on multiple occasions by Joint Commission International (JCI), the internationally recognised healthcare accreditation body. The hospital received JCI accreditation for the fifth time in 2024, demonstrating sustained compliance with international standards in patient safety, care quality, and institutional governance.
