= Üsküdar University =

Private university in Üsküdar, Istanbul, Turkey

Coordinates: 41.0247°N 29.0389°E

- Üsküdar Üniversitesi
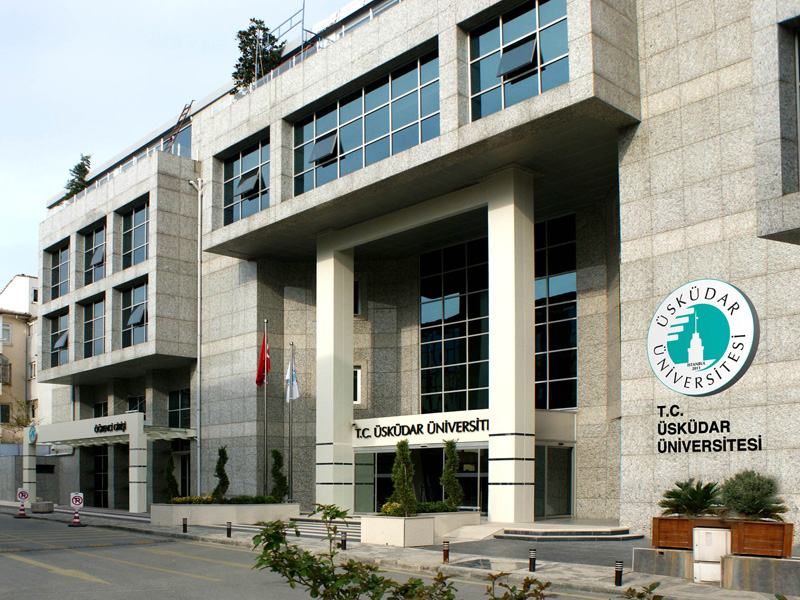
- Motto: One step closer to understanding human nature
- Type: Foundation
- Established: 2011
- President: Prof.Dr. Nazife Güngör
- Faculty: 1029
- Students: 23.692
- Location: Üsküdar, Istanbul, Turkey
- Campus: Suburban
- Colors: Green and white
- Nickname: UU
- Website: www.uskudar.edu.tr

University rankings

Regional – Overall
- QS Emerging Europe and Central Asia: 301-350 (2022)

Üsküdar University is a foundation university established in 2011 in Üsküdar, Istanbul, Turkey by the Human Values and Mental Health Foundation under the leadership of Prof. Nevzat Tarhan, who served as the president. The law concerning the establishment of the university was published in the Official Gazette on March 3, 2011, under number 27863.

Founded with the title of "Türkiye's first thematic university", Üsküdar University welcomed its first students in the 2012-2013 academic year. In June 2014, the university graduated its first students.

NP Feneryolu Medical Center and NP Etiler Medical Center became part of Üsküdar University as of October 2011, forming the "NPSUAM Neuropsychiatry Health, Practice, and Research Center." In 2011, the Graduate School of Social Sciences and the Graduate School of Health Sciences were put into operation with the establishment of the university. The Graduate School of Natural Sciences was founded in 2013. In June 2014, 270 students graduated from the Health Services Vocational School after successfully completing the 2-year program. In July 2014, Üsküdar University established the Institute for Sufism Studies, marking another first in Turkey.

== Academic Staff ==
The Rector of Üsküdar University, under the leadership of President Prof. K. Nevzat TARHAN as the President of Supreme Council of Management, is Prof. Nazife GÜNGÖR. The university's academic staff includes many notable names such as Prof. Sevil Atasoy, Prof. Deniz Ülke Kaynak, Prof. Gökben Hızlı Sayar, Prof. Tayfun Uzbay, and Prof. Türker Tekin Ergüzel.

== History ==
At the beginning, NP Group opened the Turkish branch of Memory Centers of America on May 25, 1999, on Baghdad Street in Istanbul with the participation of the President of the Republic, Süleyman Demirel. Memory Centers, having accomplished implementing the "Brain check-up" and "Magnetic stimulation Treatment (TMS) (first in Turkey), continue to uninterruptedly offer new treatment methods in psychiatry effectively with its highly qualified, expert staff.

Memory Center adopted relying on scientific measurements in the diagnosis and the treatment of brain functions dealing with neurological and psychiatric diseases, realizing one year later, the second stage opening of its Child and Adolescent Psychiatry Unit on October 3, 2000 with the participation of Wenon Wells, the President of "Memory Center of America".

In February 2003, NP GROUP put into service a five-story center for Adult Neurology and Psychiatry in Feneryolu, and allocated the villa behind it for young children and adolescent psychiatry.

Since November 2006, NP GROUP has been using functional and volumetric MR visualization techniques. Then on March 20, 2007, they established the first and the only Neuropsychiatry Hospital in Turkey, and began meeting the needs for an in-patient institution and with the participation of Bülent Arınç, President of Grand National Assembly of Turkey, inaugurated the hospital.

In June 2009, NP GROUP started the first Clinical Pharmacogenetic Laboratory in Neuropsychiatry in Turkey, and on August 10, 2009, established the service of Child and Adolescent Psychology and adult psychiatry at NP ISTANBUL Polyclinic at Etiler.

Üsküdar University has been officially established since March 3, 2011.

== Faculties ==
Faculty of Engineering and Natural Sciences

- Department of Bioengineering
- Department of Chemical and Biological Engineering (English)
- Department of Computer Engineering (English)
- Department of Electrical and Electronics Engineering (English)
- Department of Forensic Sciences (Turkish)
- Department of Industrial Engineering (English)
- Department of Molecular Biology and Genetics (English - Turkish)
- Department of Software Engineering (English)

Faculty of Humanities and Social Sciences'

- Department of History
- Department of Philosophy
- Department of Psychology (Turkish)
- Department of Psychology (English)
- Department of Political Science and International Relations (Turkish - English)
- Department of Sociology

Faculty of Health Sciences

- Department of Audiology
- Department of Child Development
- Department of Nutrition and Dietetics
- Department of Speech and Language Therapy
- Department of Health Management
- Department of Midwifery
- Department of Nursing
- Department of Occupational Health and Safety
- Department of Occupational Therapy
- Department of Orthotics and Prosthetics
- Department of Perfusion
- Department of Physiotherapy and Rehabilitation
- Department of Social Work

Faculty of Communication studies|Communications

- Department of Advertising Design and Communication
- Department of Cartoon and Animation
- Department of Media and Communication
- Department of New Media and Journalism
- Department of Public Relations
- Department of Radio, Television and Cinema
- Department of Visual Communication Design

School of Medicine

- Department of Surgical Medical Sciences
- Department of Internal Medical Sciences
- Department of Basic Medical Sciences

School of Dentistry

== Graduate institutes ==
- Graduate School of Addiction and Forensic Sciences
- Graduate School of Natural Sciences
- Graduate School of Health Sciences
- Graduate School of Social Sciences
- Institute for Sufi Studies

== Vocational schools of higher education ==
- Department of Emergency and Disaster Management
- Department of Oral and Dental Health
- Department of Operating Room Services
- Department of Anesthesia
- Department of Biomedical Device Technology
- Department of Environmental Health
- Department of Child Development
- Department of Child Protection and Care Services
- Department of Dental Prosthesis Technology
- Department of Dialysis
- Department of Pharmacy Services
- Department of Electroneurophysiology
- Department of Disabled Care and Rehabilitation
- Department of Physiotherapy
- Department of Food Technology
- First and Emergency Aid Department
- Department of Occupational Health and Safety
- Department of Laboratory Technology
- Department of Nuclear Technology and Radiation Safety
- Department of Audiometry
- Department of Opticians
- Department of Orthopedic Prosthetics and Orthotics
- Department of Autopsy Assistantship
- Department of Perfusion Techniques
- Department of Radiotherapy
- Department of Health Information Systems Technician
- Department of Health Institutions Management
- Department of Social Security
- Department of Social Services
- Department of Medical Documentation and Secretarial
- Department of Medical Imaging Techniques
- Department of Medical Laboratory Techniques
- Department of Medical Promotion and Marketing
- Department of Medicinal and Aromatic Plants
- Department of Elderly Care

== Space Experiments and Üsküdar University ==
As part of the National Space Program led by the Turkish Space Agency, one of the 13 scientific projects carried out by Alper Gezeravcı at the International Space Station was the "Message (Microgravity Associated Genetics) Science Mission", developed by Üsküdar University's TRGENMER. The project, selected in May 2023, aimed to research the "identification of genes that are affected by microgravity, whose functions are yet to be discovered, and to determine, using CRISPR gene engineering techniques, which immune cells are directly affected by gravity in space missions.",

== Student Exchange Program ==
Üsküdar University has 412 international university agreements within the scope of the Student Exchange Program.

== Research & Laboratories ==
Üsküdar University has 39 Research and Application Centers and 86 laboratories. Between 2023 and 2024, the number of publications indexed in international databases (SCI, SCI-exp, AHCI) was 2,364. The total project support amounted to 6.2 million TRY.

== Libraries ==
Üsküdar University has 4 libraries:

The university's libraries collectively hold 86,475 printed books, 1,114,627 e-books, 68,422 e-journals, 3,187 theses, 70 video tutorials, 473 CDs, and 22 subscribed databases. The total library space is 7,974 m², with a seating capacity of 3,507.

== Science and Idea Festival ==
Since 2014, the Science and Idea Festival has been organized annually at Üsküdar University, where high school students participate. The festival, which combines fun with science, aims to encourage young people to develop creative projects and conduct scientific research under the supervision of project mentors in the fields of Social Sciences, Science and Technology, and Health Sciences. The festival also aims to contribute to the development of multifaceted thinking and entrepreneurial skills. Prizes are awarded to the projects that rank highly in the festival.

== High Human Values Awards ==
Since 2016, the rectorate of Üsküdar University has been awarding the High Human Values Award annually to individuals who have contributed to society in areas such as Transformational Leadership, Social Empathy, and Contribution to Democracy Culture, becoming role models in the community.

== Campuses ==
Üsküdar University has five campuses located in the Üsküdar and Ümraniye districts. The Main Campus and South Campus are located in Altunizade. The Çarşı Campus is in the center of Üsküdar; the Faculty of Medicine NP Campus, NP Health Campus, and Üsküdar Dental Hospital are located in Ümraniye. The Faculty of Engineering and Natural Sciences is located at the Main Campus; the Faculty of Human and Social Sciences and the Faculty of Communication are at the South Campus. The Faculty of Medicine is located at the NP Medicine Campus. The Faculty of Dentistry is at the NP Health Campus. The Health Services Vocational School and various departments of the Faculty of Health Sciences are located at the Çarşı Campus and NP Health Campus.

== See also ==
- List of universities in Turkey
- Istanbul Atlas University
- YÖS Exam
