= Society for Brain Mapping and Therapeutics =

US-based non-profit biomedical association

Society for Brain Mapping and Therapeutics (SBMT)
- Founded: 2004
- Purpose: Brain mapping & therapeutics
- Location: 2080 Century Park East, Suite 500, Los Angeles, CA, 90067
- Key people: Babak Kateb Founder/Chairman/CEO SBMT
- Website: www.worldbrainmapping.org
- Current president- Dr. Namath Hussain

The Society for Brain Mapping and Therapeutics (SBMT) is a non-profit biomedical association (501c6) principally concerned with Brain Mapping and Intra-operative Surgical planning. International Brain Mapping and Intraoperative Surgical planning Foundation (IBMISPF) DBA The Brain Mapping Foundation provides funding to members of the society.

In 2013 SBMT Board and Members defined Brain Mapping as the study of the anatomy and function of the brain and spinal cord through the use of imaging (including intra-operative, microscopic, endoscopic and multi-modality imaging), immunohistochemistry, molecular & optogenetics, stem cell and cellular biology, engineering (material, electrical and biomedical), neurophysiology and nanotechnology.

== History ==
The Society for Brain Mapping and Therapeutics (SBMT) was founded in 2004 to break boundaries in healthcare. The society promotes policies that support rapid, safe, and cost-effective translation of new technology into medicine. SBMT played a significant role in the formulation, planning and execution of Obama's BRAIN Initiative and in 2013 pioneered the G20+ World Brain Mapping & Therapeutic Initiative, which is aimed at creating a global consortium focusing on integration of nanotechnology, imaging, cellular/stem cell therapeutics, Information Technology (IT) and devices (this approach called NanoBioElectronics) in Brain Mapping.

Collaborating partners also include: Australian Government and Australian Bio Tech (collections of 650 Australasia biotech firms), Canadian government and scientists, Turkish scientists, more than 200 universities and research institutions across the world. Man of the US Government Agencies. SBMT has near 3000 contacts with the industry around the globe.

== Executive Board ==
- Babak Kateb-Founding Chairman of the Board and CEO
- Aaron G. Filler-13th President (2015–2016)
- Kuldip Sidhu-11th President of (2013-14)

== Board Members ==
Board appointments is one year with possibility of extension depending on how active the member is.

- Babak Kateb
- Nevzat Tarhan
- Rafat Ansari
- Mitchel S. Berger
- Yu Chen
- Mike Y. Chen
- Kirsty Duncan
- John S. George
- Kian Kaviani
- Jessica Rose
- Allyson C. Rosen
- Ejaz Shamim
- Gary K. Steinberg
- James S. Welsh
- Vicky Yamamoto
- Jeffrey P. Sutton
- Jakob Van Zyl
- Evgeny Tsimerinov

== Previous conferences ==
- 2004 (15 Nov) Keck School of Medicine, USC
- 2005 (17–19 Nov) Pasadena, CA, USA
- 2006 (5–8 Sep) Clermont Ferrand, France
- 2007 (6–8 Sep) Washington DC, USA
- 2008 (26–29 Aug) Los Angeles, CA, USA
- 2009 (26–29 Aug) Harvard Medical School, Boston, USA
- 2010 (24-27 May) Uniformed Services University of the Health Sciences, Bethesda, USA
- 2011 (8-10 Jun) Mission Bay Conference Center, San Francisco, CA, USA
- 2012 (2-4 Jun) Metro Toronto Conference Center, Toronto, ON, Canada
- 2013 (12-14 May) Baltimore Convention Center, Baltimore, MD, USA
- 2014 (17-19 Mar) Four Seasons Hotel, Sydney, Australia
- 2015 (6-8 Mar) L.A. Convention Center, Los Angeles, CA, USA
- 2016 (8-10 April) Miami Convention Center, Miami, FL, USA
- 2017 (18-20 April) Millennium Biltmore Hotel, Los Angeles, CA, USA
- 2018 (13-15 April) Millennium Biltmore Hotel, Los Angeles, CA, USA
- 2019 (15-17 March) L.A. Convention Center, Los Angeles, CA, USA
- 2020 - Had to be postponed due to COVID-19 Pandemic
- 2021 (8-11 July) L.A. Convention Center, Los Angeles, CA, USA
- 2022 (10-13 March) L.A. Convention Center, Los Angeles, CA, USA
- 2023 (16-19 February) L.A. Convention Center, Los Angeles, CA, USA
