= List of Dutch people of Turkish descent =

This is a list of notable Dutch people of Turkish descent. It includes Dutch citizens of full or partial Turkish ancestry.

== Academia ==
- Deniz Başkent, auditory scientist
- Sinan Çankaya, cultural anthropologist.
- Ahmet Çelik, professor at Bilkent University.
- Fatih Kiliç, lecturer in philosophy at the University of Amsterdam.
- Uğur Ümit Üngör, scholar of genocide studies.

== Journalism ==
- Ali Çimen, author and journalist
- Rasit Elibol, editor of De Groene Amsterdammer

== Activism ==
- Birsen Basar, ambassador of the Dutch Autism Association
- Maviye Karaman Ince, feminist

== Arts and literature ==
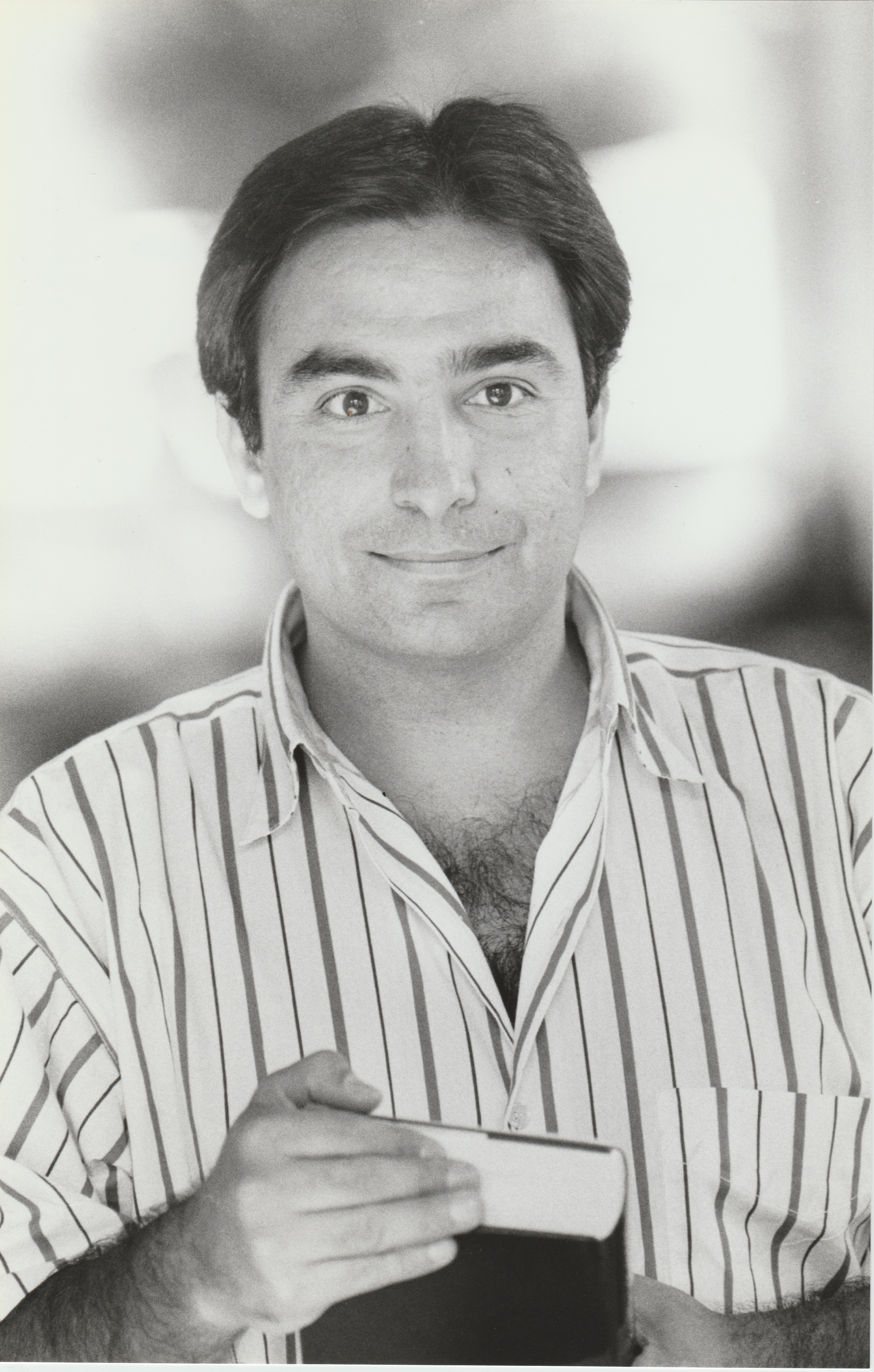
Halil Gür, writer.

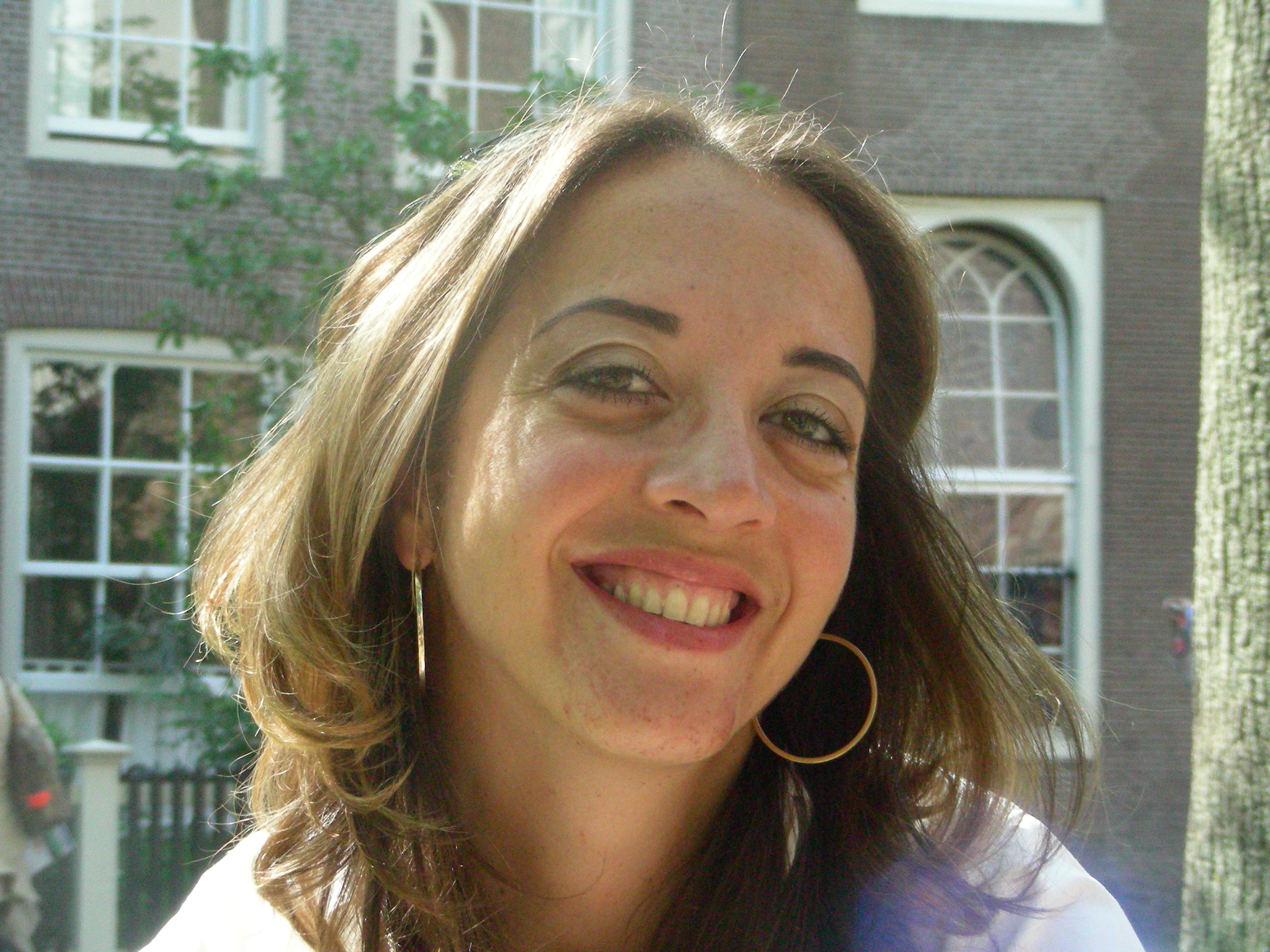
Ebru Umar, writer.

- Özcan Akyol, writer
- Defne Ayas, curator, lecturer, educator, and editor in the field of contemporary art and its institutions
- Erdal Balci, journalist
- Sevtap Baycılı, novelist
- Sedat Çakır, writer
- Altan Erdogan, former editor of the Dutch weekly magazine Nieuwe Revu
- Emre Hüner, is a visual artist
- Özkan Gölpinar publicist for Trouw, De Groene Amsterdammer and Contrast
- Halil Gür, novelist
- Hatice Guleryuz, contemporary artist
- Lale Gül, writer
- Mehmet Refii Kileci, artist
- Servet Kocyigit, visual artist
- Deniz Kuypers, writer (Turkish father and Dutch mother)
- Ahmet Ögüt, conceptual artist
- Şenay Özdemir, journalist and editor-in-chief of SEN Magazine
- Murat Tuncel, journalist
- Ebru Umar, columnist
- Sadık Yemni, science fiction author

== Business ==
- Atilla Aytekin, founder and CEO of Azerion Group N.V.
- Aysel Erbudak, businesswoman
- Elcin Barker Ergun is a business leader in the pharmaceutical industry
- Nedim Imac, businessman and former chairman of the Amsterdam football club Türkiyemspor
- Celal Oruç, founder of Ortel Mobile
- Erdinç Saçan, internet entrepreneur
- Atilay Uslu, entrepreneur and co-founder of Corendon Airlines.

== Cinema and television ==
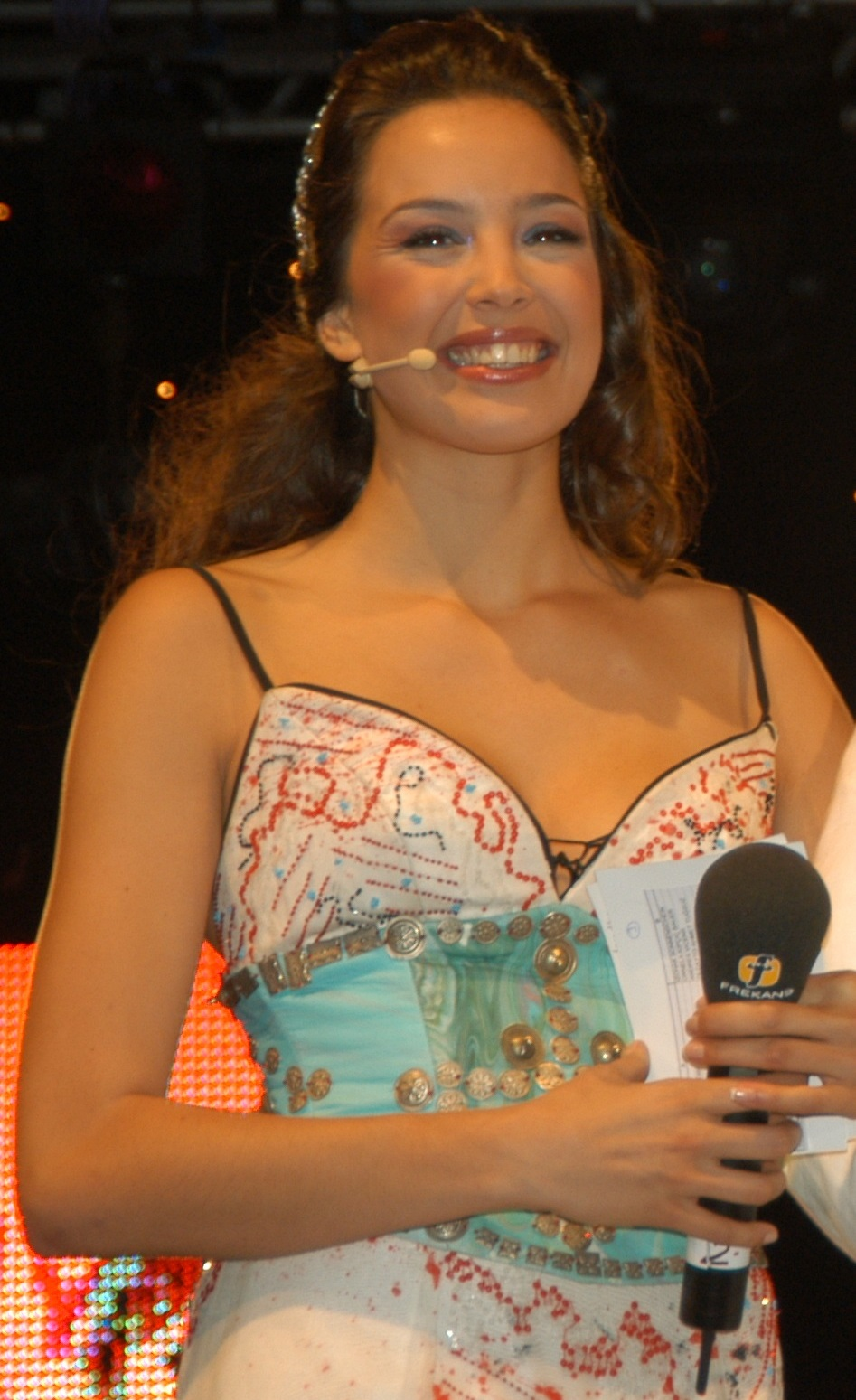
Azra Akın, actress, singer, Miss Turkey 2002, and Miss World 2002.

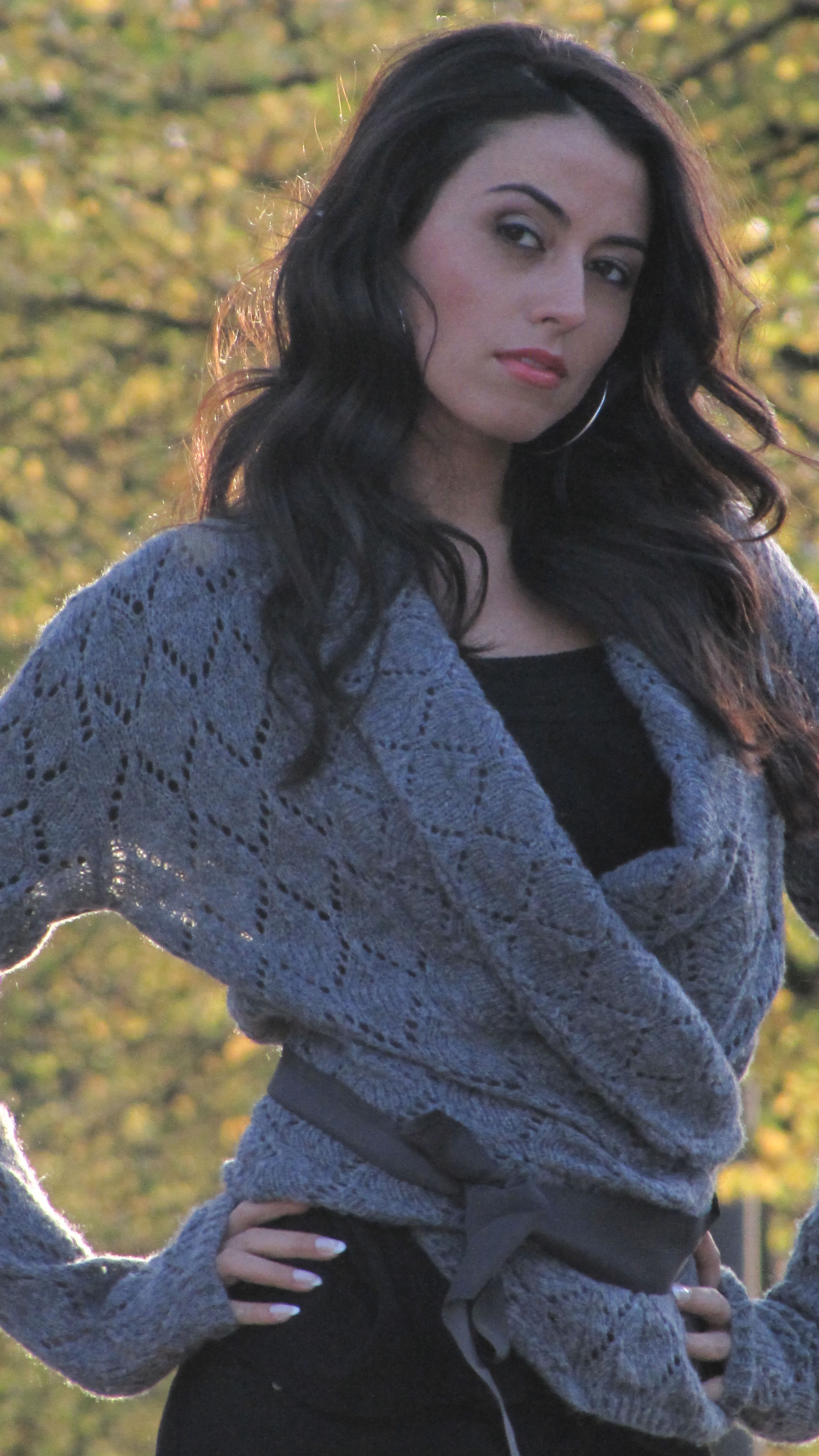
Deniz Akkoyun, actress and Miss Nederland 2008.

- Azra Akın, actress, singer and winner of Miss Turkey 2002 and Miss World 2002
- Deniz Akkoyun, actress and winner of Miss Nederland 2008
- Evrim Akyigit, actress
- Elvan Akyıldız, actress
- Pinar Arslan, crowned Miss Gelderland in 2011 and placed 4th in Miss Nederland 2011
- Sinan Can, documentary maker
- Sinan Cihangir, actor
- Ali Çifteci, actor
- Mustafa Duygulu, film director, screenwriter and actor
- Hayat Van Eck, actor
- Fidan Ekiz, presenter and documentary maker
- Reyhan Erdogan, actress
- Sevtap Ergec, placed 5th in Miss Nederland 2010
- Sinan Eroglu, actor
- Fatma Genç, actress
- Dilara Horuz, actress
- Ismail Ilgun, vlogger on YouTube and documentary maker
- Ibo Karatay, film director
- Sinem Kavus, actress
- Özlem Kaymaz, winner of Miss Turkey 1992 and mother of Miss Turkey 2018 Tara De Vries
- Ersin Kiris, TV Presenter
- Ayberk Köprülü, TV Presenter
- Funda Müjde, actress
- Gürkan Küçüksentürk, actor
- Nazmiye Oral, actress and writer
- Cahit Ölmez, actor
- Melisa Aslı Pamuk, actress and winner of Miss Turkey 2011
- Inci Lulu Pamuk, actress
- Ahmet Polat, filmmaker
- Ergun Simsek, actor
- Tunç Topçuoglu, filmmaker and art director
- Gamze Tazim, actress
- Nazlı Tolga, television host and model
- Tara De Vries, winner of Miss Turkey 2018
- Mehmet Ülger, documentary maker
- Meral Uslu, filmmaker
- Toprak Yalçiner, actress
- Nilgün Yerli, actress
- Dilan Yurdakul, actress

== Military ==
- Cengiz Sahan, Force Commander

== Music ==
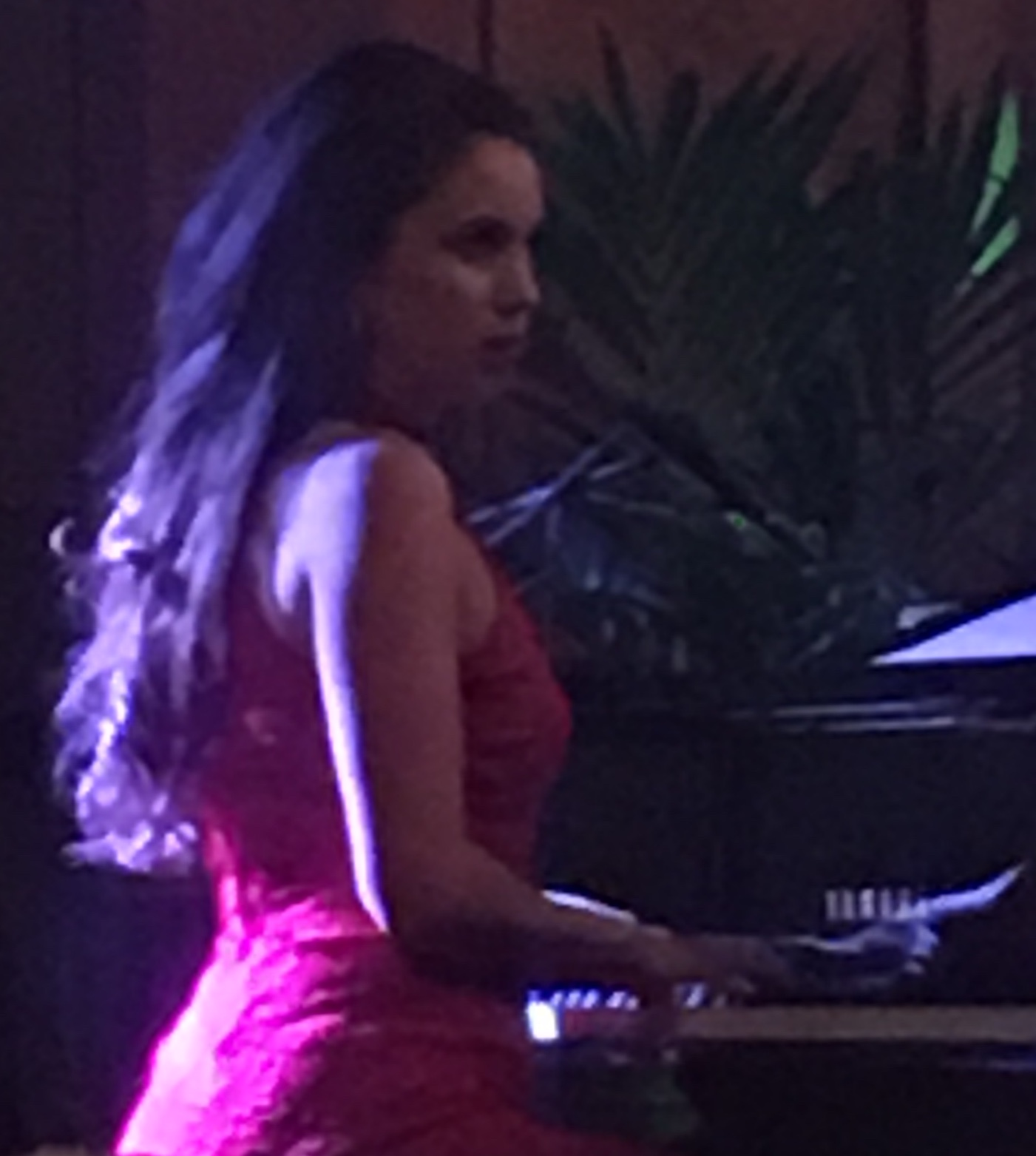
Karsu Dönmez, singer and pianist.

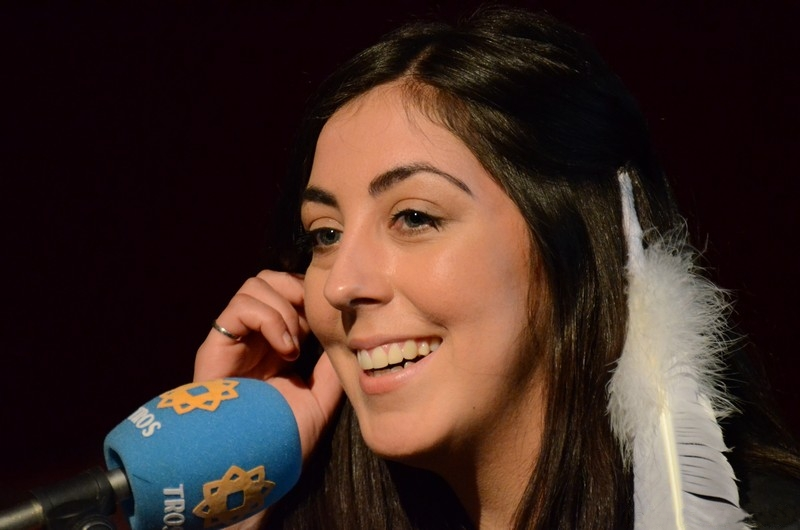
Joan Franka, singer.

- Sinan Akçıl, singer-songwriter and record producer
- Serenad Bayraktar, trumpet player and singer
- Ufuk Çalışkan, singer
- Serdar Demirbas, folk musician
- Selim Doğru, composer
- Atiye Deniz, singer
- Selim Doğru, pianist
- Karsu Dönmez, singer, pianist and composer
- Mete Erker, saxophonist
- Joan Franka, singer who represented the Netherlands at the Eurovision Song Contest 2012
- Altın Gün, Anatolian rock and Turkish Psychedelic Folk band
- Burak King, rapper, songwriter and musician
- MC Lynx, rapper
- Murda, rapper
- Ragga Oktay, singer
- Ummet Ozcan, DJ and record producer
- Sera (singer)
- Taylan Susam, composer of experimental music
- Umut Timur, singer
- Buse Unlu, singer
- Behsat Üvez, singer and composer
- Sefa Vlaarkamp, disc jockey and music producer (Turkish father)
- Burak Yeter, DJ, record producer and remixer

== Religion ==
- Fatih Üçler Dağ, chairman of Aya Sofia.

== Politics ==
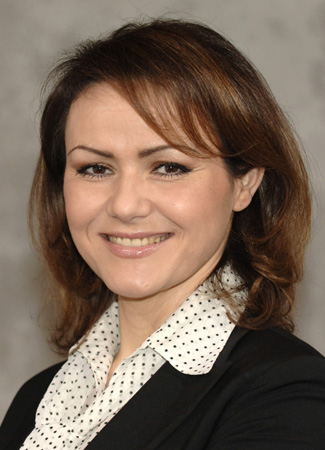
Nebahat Albayrak.

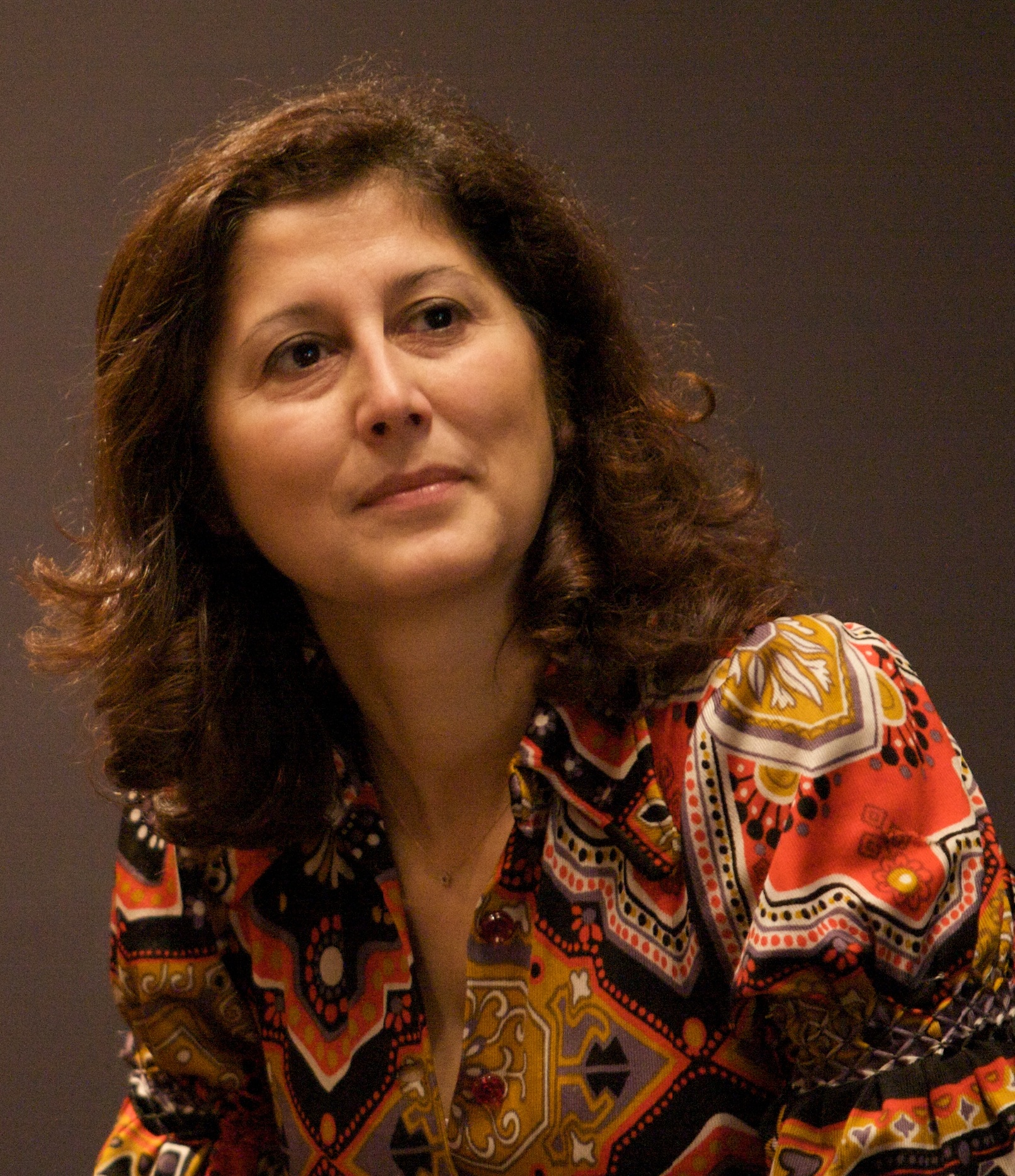
Fatma Koşer Kaya.

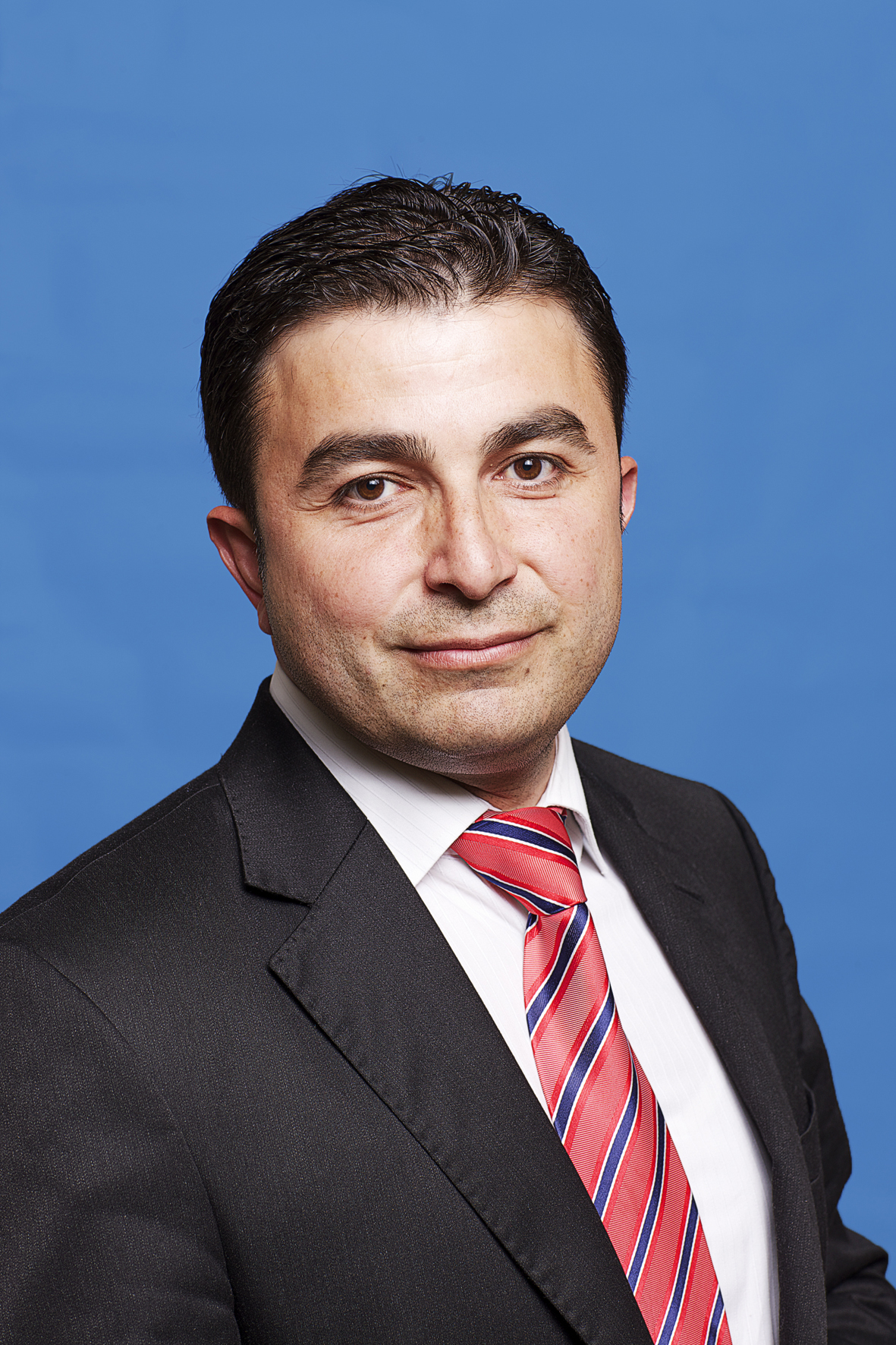
Selçuk Öztürk.

- Nebahat Albayrak, member of the PvdA
- Neza Albayrak, member of the PvdA
- Mahir Alkaya, member of the SP
- Stephan van Baarle, member of DENK
- Ali Osman Biçen
- Emine Bozkurt, Member of the European Parliament (2004 and 2014) and member of the PvdA
- Yasemin Cegerek, member of the PvdA
- Metin Çelik, former member of the PvdA, current chairman of DENK
- Coşkun Çörüz, member of the CDA
- Nihat Eski, member of the CDA
- Sultan Günal-Gezer member of the PvdA
- Nilüfer Gündoğan, member of Volt
- Isa Kahraman, member of NSC.
- Hamit Karakus, member of the PvdA
- Ufuk Kâhya, Dutch politician serving as a member of the European Parliament
- Hülya Kat, member of the D66
- Fatma Koşer Kaya, lawyer and a member of the D66
- Orhan Kaya, councillor for participation and culture in the municipality of Rotterdam
- Tunahan Kuzu, co-founder of DENK
- Münire Manisa, member of the PvdA
- Songül Mutluer, member of the PvdA
- Fadime Örgü, member of the People's Party for Freedom and Democracy
- Zihni Özdil, historian and member of GL
- Selçuk Öztürk, co-founder of DENK
- Nevin Özütok, member of GL
- Ayhan Tonca, councilor in Apeldoorn for the CDA
- Yasin Torunoglu, member of the PvdA
- Gunay Uslu, member of the D66 and the State Secretary for Culture and Media (2022-2023)
- Dilan Yeşilgöz-Zegerius, leader of the People's Party for Freedom and Democracy (2023-present)
- Keklik Yücel, member of the PvdA

== Sports ==
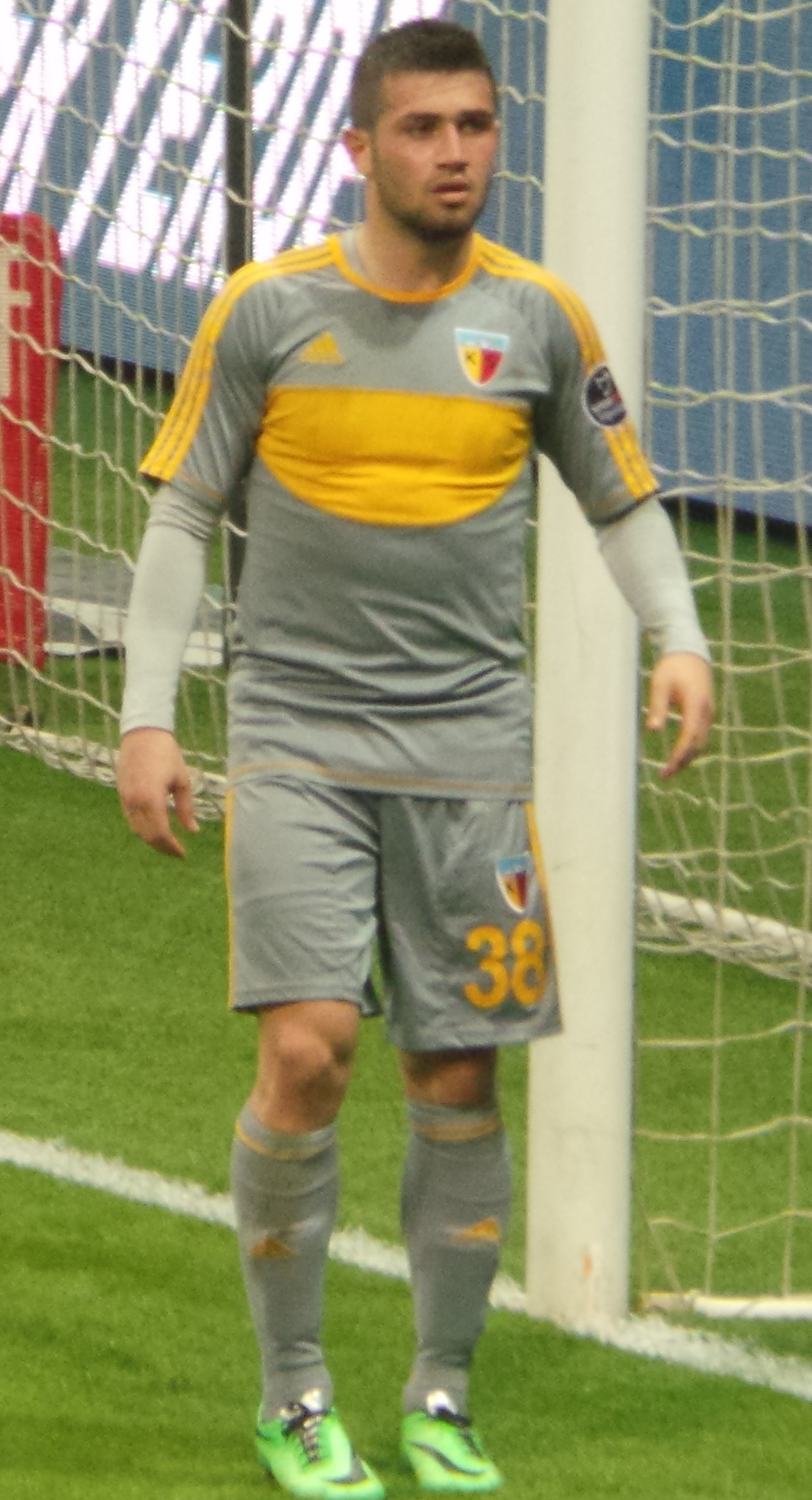
Ömer Bayram, football player.

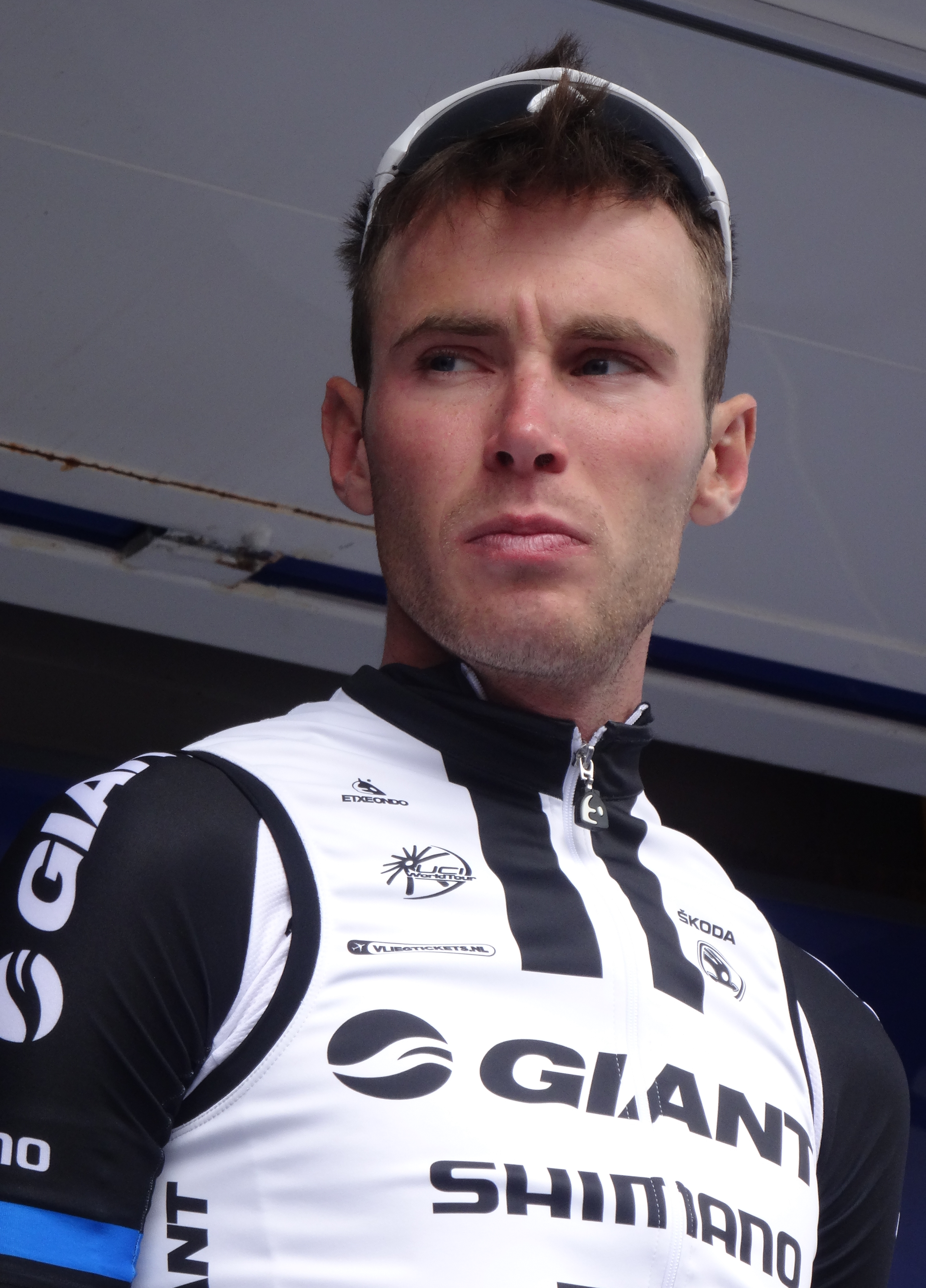
Brian Bulgaç, road bicycle racer.

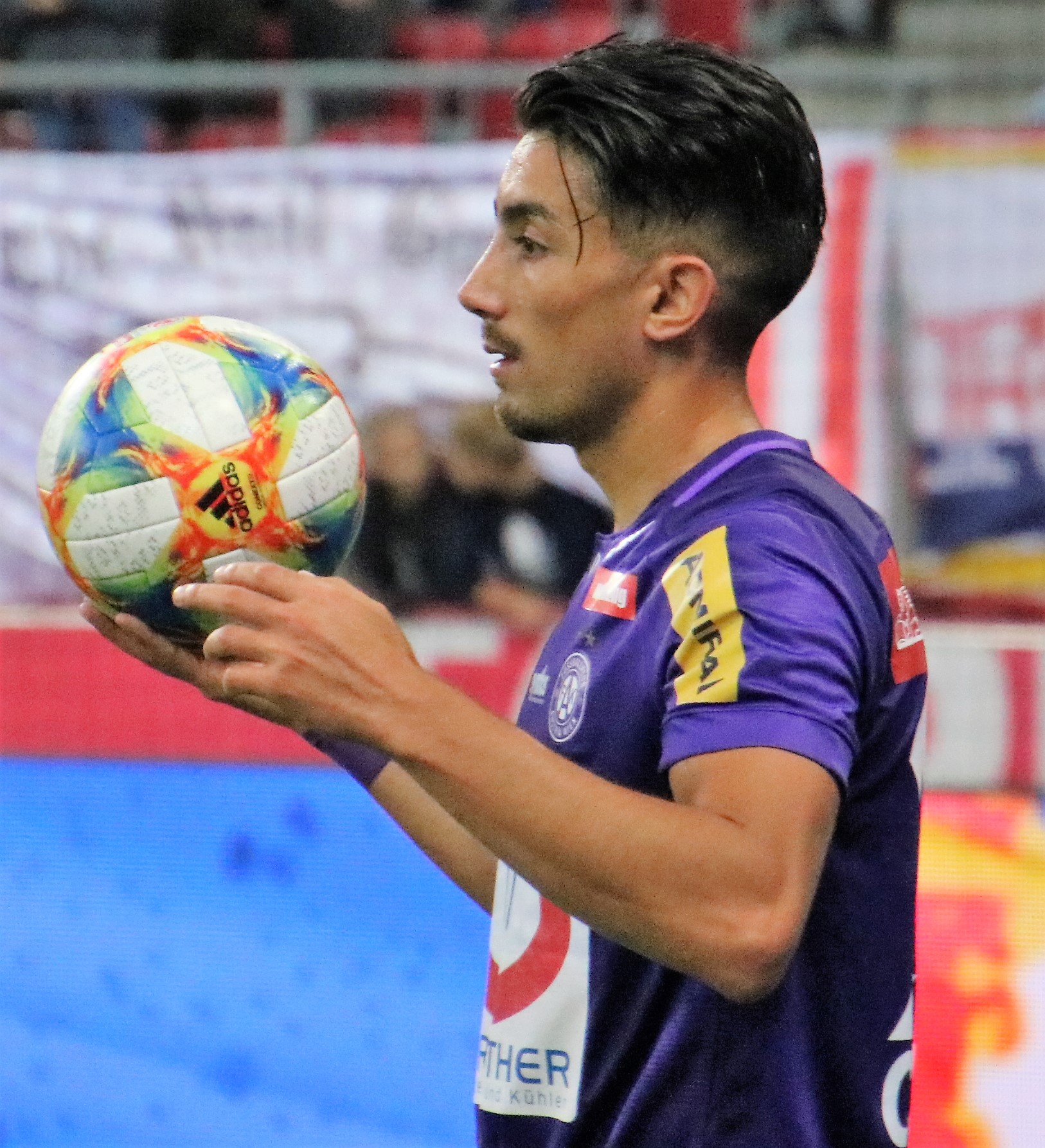
Caner Cavlan, football player.

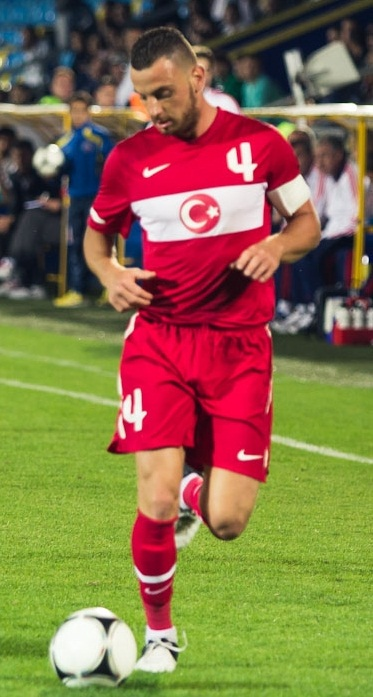
Aykut Demir, football player.

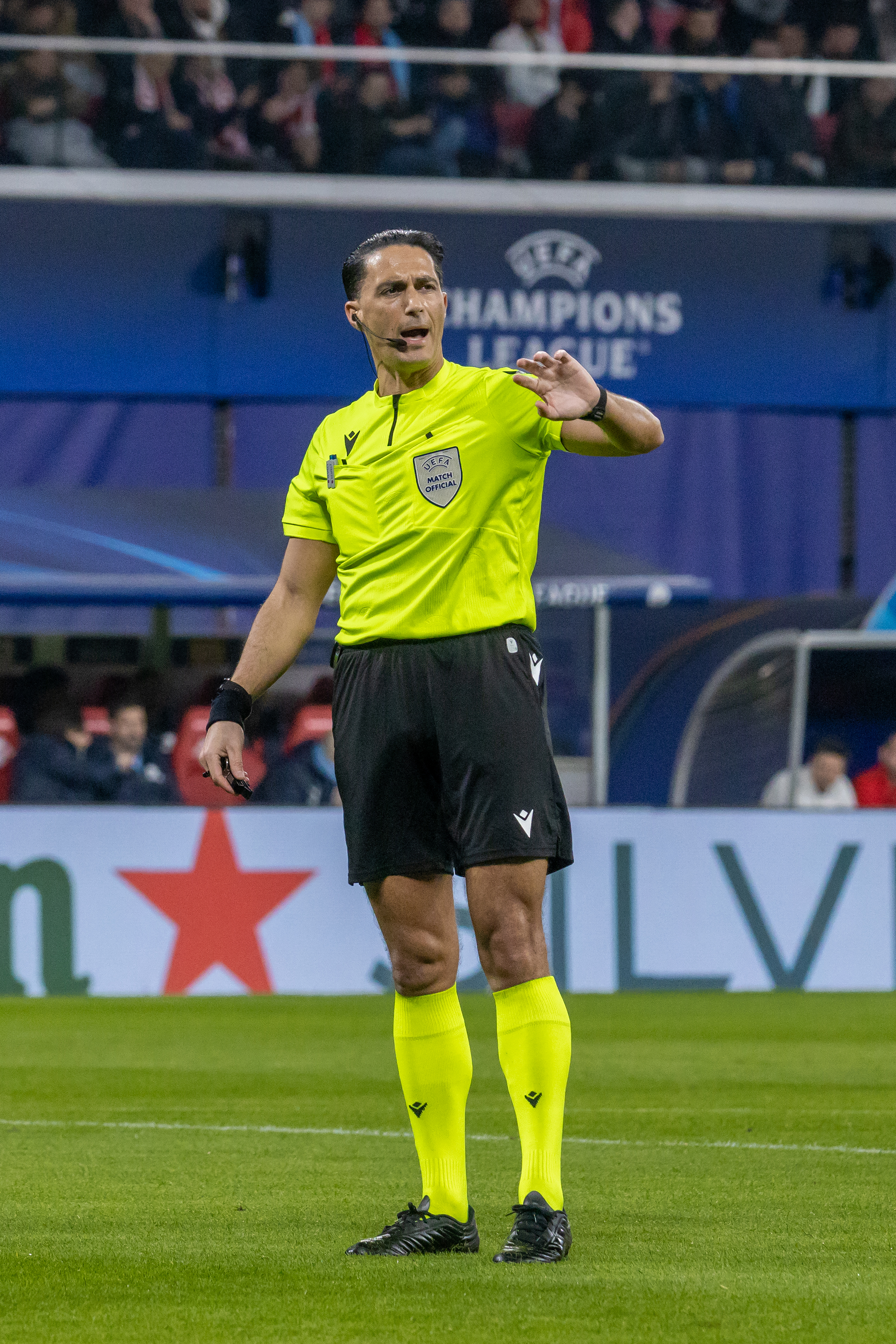
Serdar Gözübüyük, football referee.

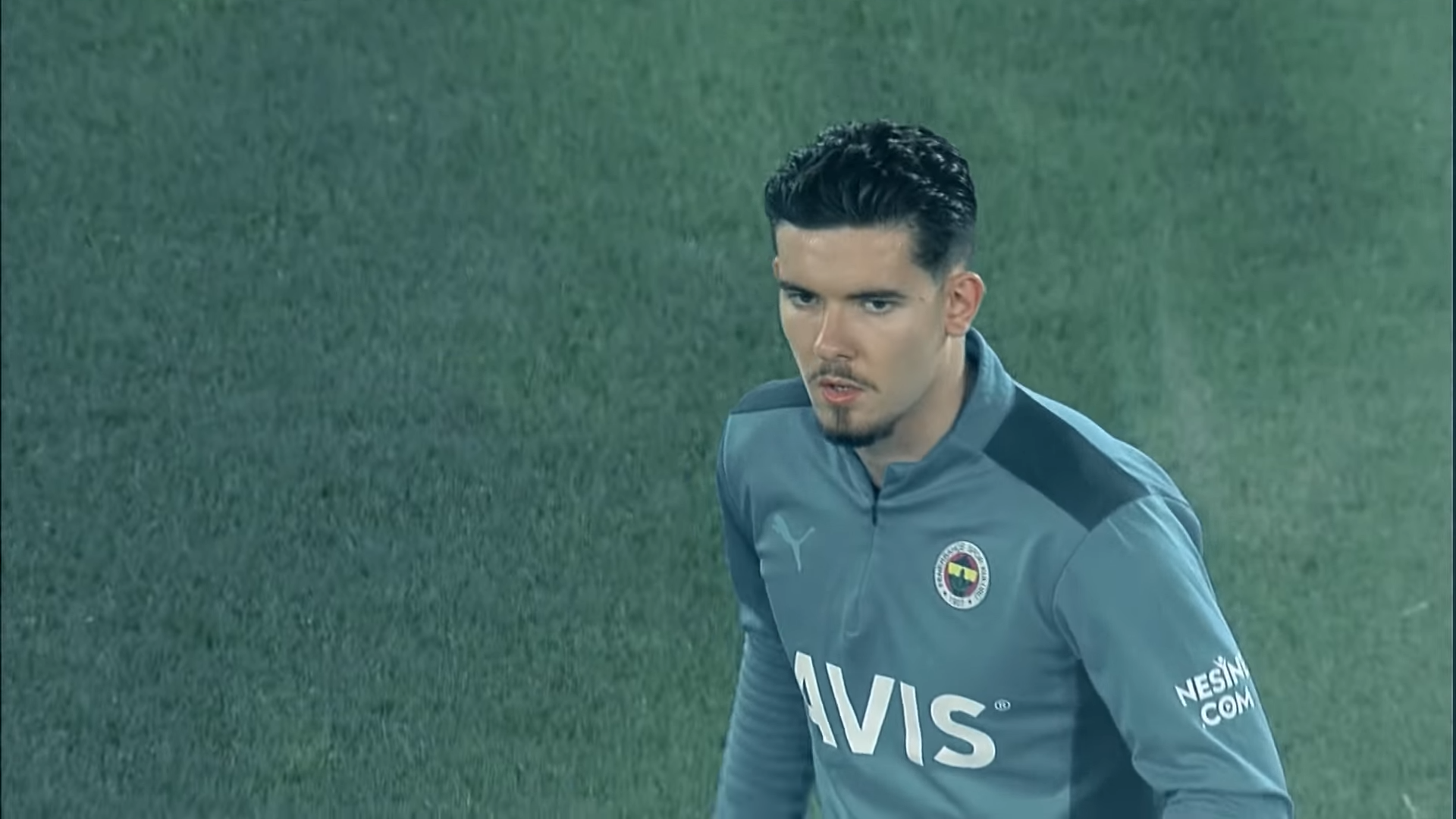
Ferdi Kadıoğlu, football player.

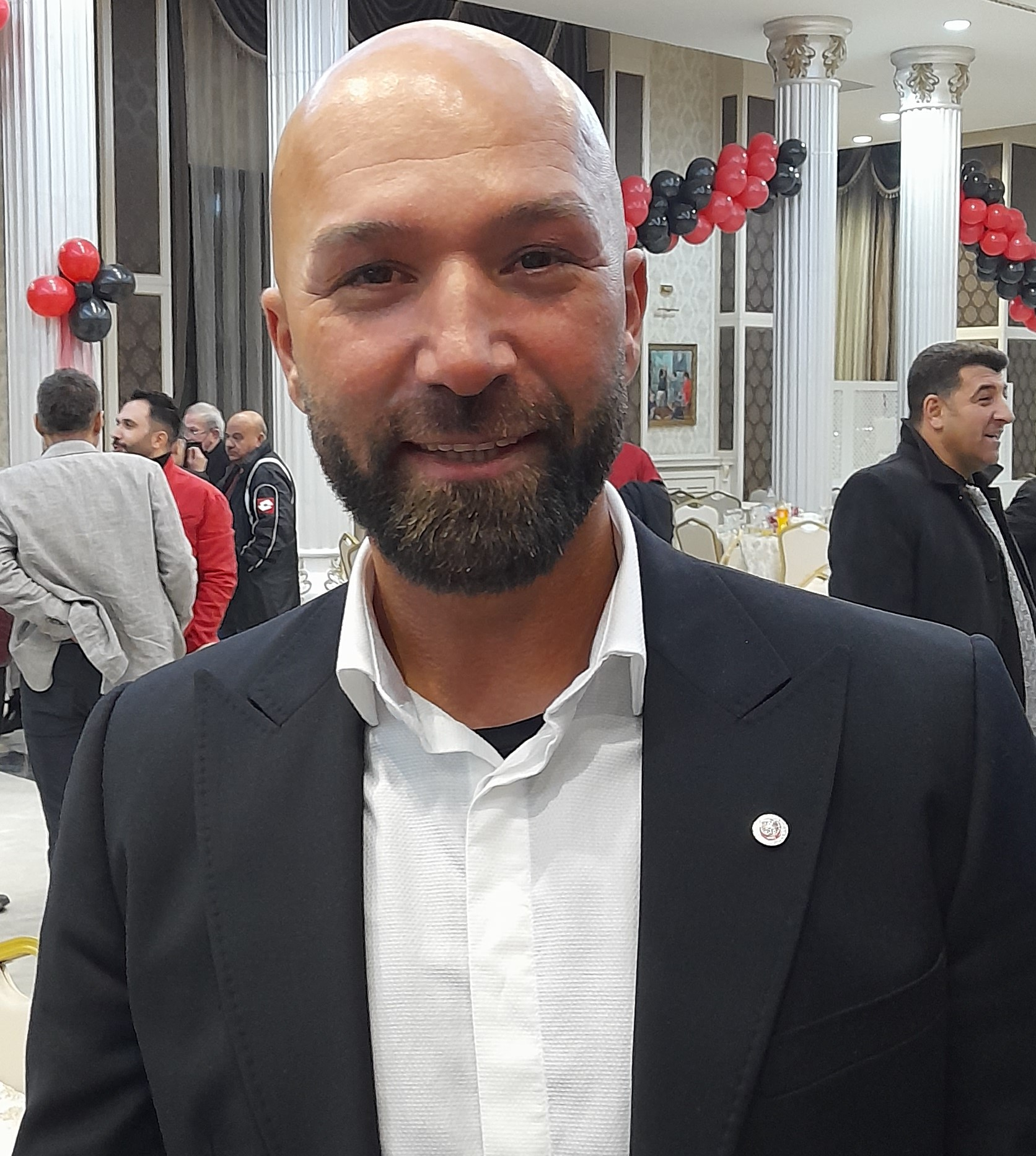
Baki Mercimek, football player.

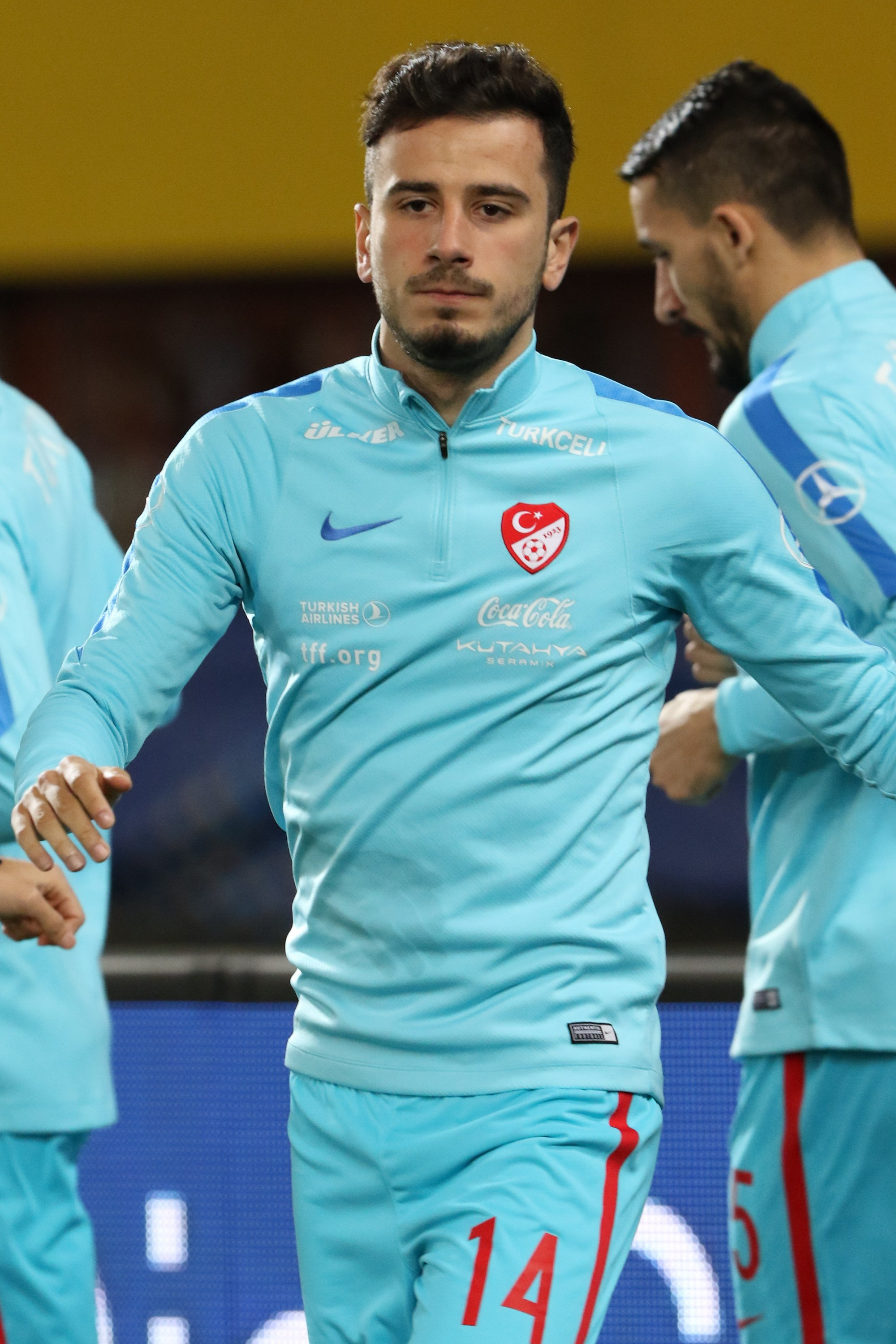
Oğuzhan Özyakup, football player.

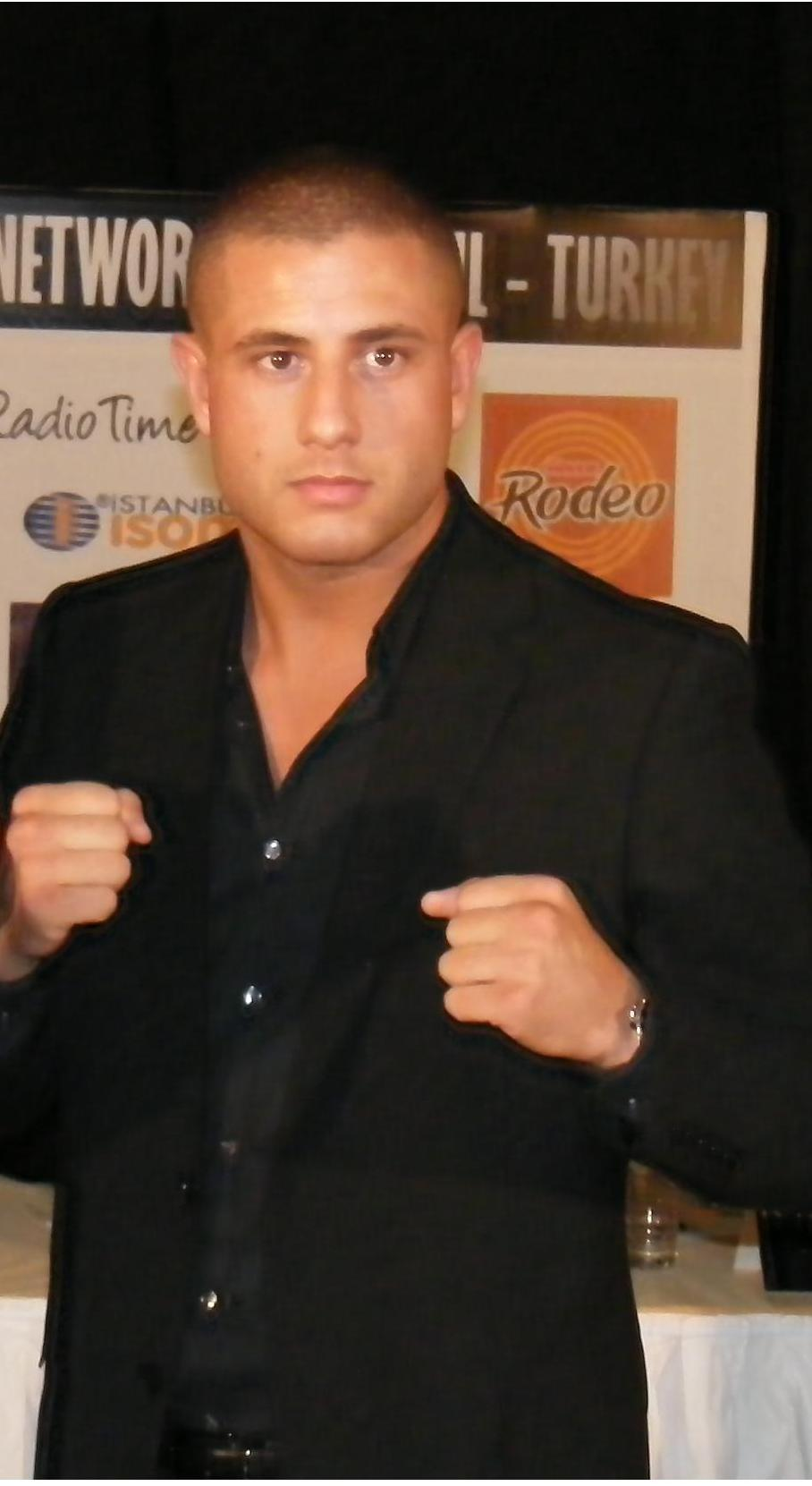
Gökhan Saki, mixed martial artist and former kickboxer.

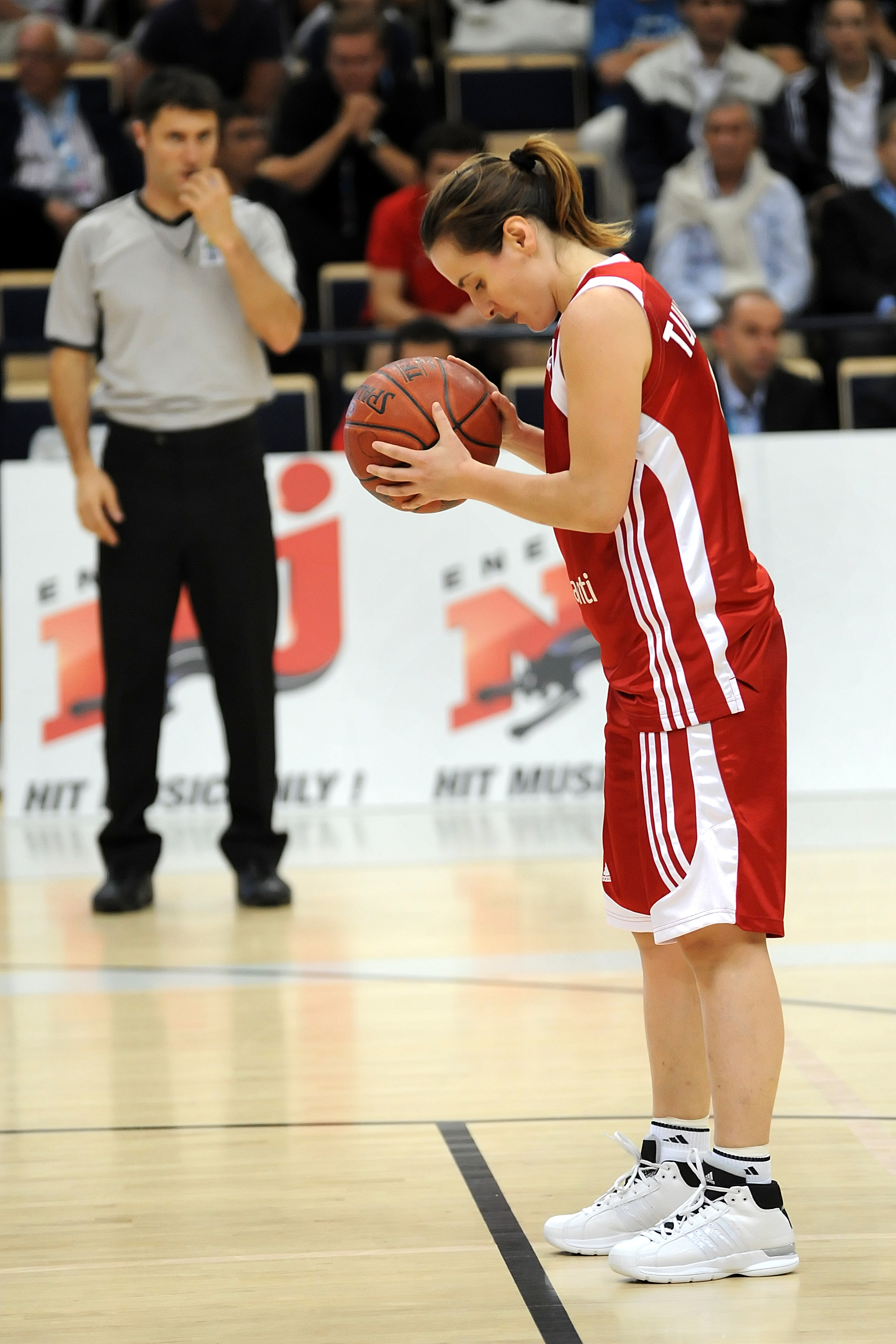
Esmeral Tunçluer, basketball player.

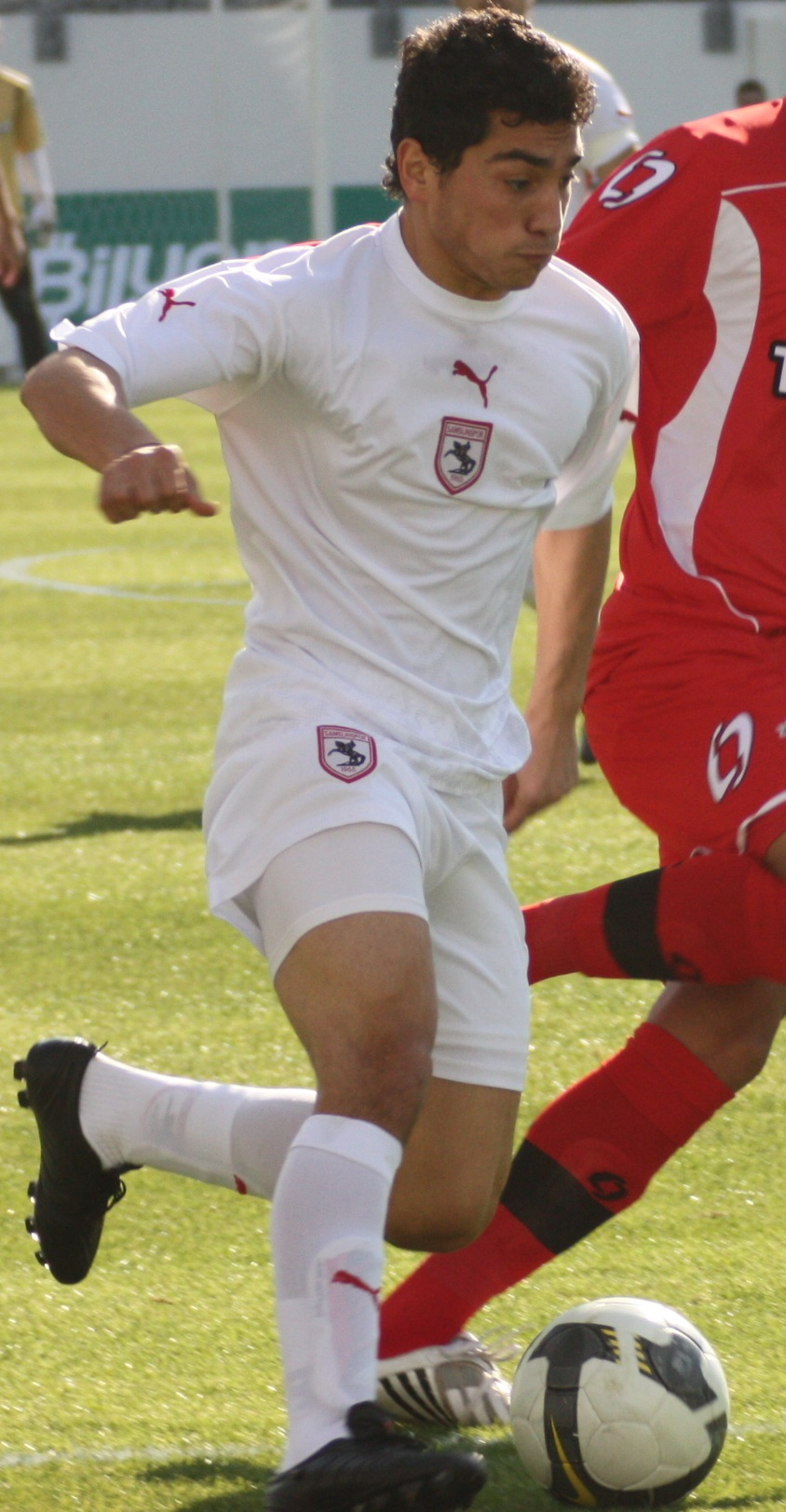
Murat Yıldırım, football player.

- Rohat Ağca, football player
- Erol Akbay, football manager
- Özgür Aktaş, football player
- Furkan Alakmak, football player
- Ibrahim Alışkan, football player
- Adnan Alisic, football player
- Erol Erdal Alkan, football player
- Ahmet Altın, football player
- Yener Arıca, football player
- Ceylan Arıkan, football player
- Deniz Aslan, football player
- Oğuz Aydın, football player
- Murat Aygün, kickboxer
- Leyla Bağcı, women's football goalkeeper
- Emre Bal, football player
- Yusuf Barası, football player
- Bilal Başaçıkoğlu, football player
- Bilal Bayazit, football player
- Ertuğrul Bayrak, kickboxer
- Ömer Bayram, football player
- Emir Biberoğlu, football player
- Emre Bilgin, football player
- Ümran Bozbıyık, football player
- Brian Bulgaç, road bicycle racer
- Samet Bulut, football player
- Hazar Can, football player
- Tayfun Candan, football player
- Caner Cavlan, football player
- Cem Cáceres, kickboxer
- Hüseyin Cengiz, football player
- Ergün Çakır, football player
- Serhat Çakmak, football player
- Cihat Çelik, football player
- Tolgahan Çiçek, football player
- Nadir Çiftçi, football player
- Halil Çolak, football player
- Tiago Çukur, football player
- Gabriël Çulhacı, football player
- Orhan Delibaş, boxer
- Aykut Demir, football player
- İlhan Demirci, football player
- Halil Dervişoğlu, football player
- Mehmet Dingil, football player
- Huseyin Dogan, football player
- Kenan Durmuşoğlu, football coach
- Eser Elmali, football player
- Ferdi Elmas, football player
- Yasin Erdal, futsal player
- Zeki Erkilinc, football player
- Alper Göbel, football player
- Serdar Gökkaya, football player
- Doğan Gölpek, football player
- Ferhat Görgülü, football player
- Serdar Gözübüyük, football referee
- Ali Gunyar, kickboxer
- Ömer Gündüz, football player
- Engin Güngör, football player
- Doğucan Haspolat, football player
- Ferdi Kadioglu, football player
- Ekrem Kahya, football player
- Fatih Kamaçi, football player
- Vural Karabulut, football player
- Mustafa Kaya, football player
- Yurtcan Kayis, football player
- Oğuzhan Kazancı, football player
- Sinan Keskin, football player
- Ahmet Kilic, football player
- Hasan Kılıç, football player
- Shirley Kocaçınar, female football player
- Serhat Koç, football player
- Çağrı Kodalak, football player
- Evren Korkmaz, football player
- Mustafa Korkmaz, wheelchair basketball player and Paralympian
- Şenol Kök, football player
- Orkun Kökçü, football player
- Ozan Kökçü, football player
- Serhat Köksal, football player
- Furkan Kurban, football player
- Baki Mercimek, football player
- Hursut Meric, football player
- Hilmi Mihçi, football player
- Muslu Nalbantoğlu, football player
- Başar Önal, football player
- Murat Önal, football player
- Tufan Özbozkurt, football player
- Serkan Ozcaglayan, kickboxer
- Tayfun Özcan, kickboxer
- Kahan Özcan, football player
- Okan Özçelik, football player
- Samed Öztoprak, football player
- Alim Öztürk, football player
- Oğuzhan Özyakup, football player
- Hatice Özyurt, kickboxer
- Hayri Pinarci, football player
- Burak Saban, football player
- Gökhan Saki, kickboxer and martial artist
- Gürcan Sari, football player
- Mustafa Saymak, football player
- Resit Schuurman, football player
- Ömer Sepici, football player
- Selman Sevinç, football player
- Fatih Sonkaya, football player
- Mahmut Sönmez, football player
- Kürşad Sürmeli, football player
- Okan Şahingöz, football player
- Tunahan Taşçı, football player
- Elayis Tavşan, football player
- Esmeral Tunçluer, basketball player
- Oğuzhan Türk, football player
- Hakan Türköz, football player
- Deniz Türüç, football player
- Ali Ulusoy, football player
- Fuat Usta, football player
- Suat Usta, football player
- Naci Ünüvar, football player
- Şahin Yakut, kickboxer
- Cihan Yalcin, football player
- Özcan Yaşar, football player
- Mohammed Ali Yeral, football player
- Atilla Yildirim, football player (Turkish German origin)
- Ismaïl Yıldırım, football player
- Murat Yıldırım, football player
- Uğur Yıldırım, football player
- Salih Yildiz, football player
- Cemal Yilmaz, football player
- Kerem Yilmaz, football player
- Mustafa Yücedağ, football player
- Ümran Zambak, football player

== Other ==
- Seyit Höçük, astrophysicist
- Marti Sarigul-Klijn, US-based test pilot.

== See also ==
- Demographics of the Netherlands
- Foreign worker
- List of Dutch people
- List of Turkish people
- Turkish diaspora
- Turks in the Netherlands
