= Miss Universe Turkiye =

Beauty pageant

Miss Universe Türkiye
- Formation: 2024; 2 years ago
- Type: Beauty pageant
- Headquarters: Istanbul
- Location: Turkey
- Members: Miss Universe
- Official language: Turkish
- President: Shakir Sela
- Website: missuniverseturkiye.com

Miss Universe Turkiye (Turkish: Kainat Güzeli Türkiye) is a national Beauty pageant in Turkey.

== History ==
Miss Universe Turkiye debuted in 2024 under Shakir Sela in Istanbul. Before 2024 Miss Turkey winners competed at Miss Universe competition.

=== 1980s ===
Since 1980 Miss Turkey pageant was initially promoted by the newspaper Cumhuriyet. It has been run by the "Miss Turkey Organization". Between the years 1980–1990, the contest was sponsored by the newspapers Güneş, Sabah, Tercüman, Bulvar, and some others.

=== 1990s ===
With the establishment of private TV channels in Turkey in 1990, the channels Magic Box, Show TV, Channel D, Star TV, NTV, CNBC-e and FOX TV took over the promotion of the pageant.

=== 2000 ===
The Miss Universe-delegate during the year 2000, Cansu Dere, was forbidden by the Turkish Government to travel to the 2000 Miss Universe pageant, in Cyprus, unless she could pass through Northern Cyprus, which was then forbidden for any visitor to the Republic of Cyprus. The competition committee in Turkey made arrangements for her to travel through Athens, but the day before her departure the government refused to let her go, "for political reasons". This was the second delegate that was not allowed to represent Turkey that year.

== Franchise holders ==
- Ozcan Sandikcioglu (1952―1980)
- Can Sandikcioglu (CIK Productions Ltd.) (1980―2022)
- Shakir Sela (2024―present)

== Titleholders ==
Year	Miss Universe Türkiye	1st Runner-up	2nd Runner-up	3rd Runner-up	4th Runner-up
2024	Ayliz Duman; Istanbul	Ilayda Anik; Istanbul	Sude Alkan; Istanbul	Ezgi Yalcinn; Istanbul	Menekse Aras; Istanbul
2025	Ceren Arslan; Istanbul	Mira Atagül; Istanbul	Hüray Ertürk; Ankara	n/a	n/a
2026	Alara Eriç	TBA	TBA	n/a	n/a

== Turkiye at Miss Universe competition ==
- : Declared as Winner
- : Ended as runner-up or top 5/6 qualification
- : Ended as one of the finalists or semifinalists
- : Ended as special awards winner

Year	Province	Miss Universe Türkiye	Placement at Miss Universe	Special Award(s)	Notes
Shakir Sela directorship — a franchise holder to Miss Universe from 2024
2026	Istanbul	Alara Erıç	Did not compete		
2025	Istanbul	Ceren Arslan	Unplaced	Miss Congeniality	
2024	Istanbul	Ayliz Duman	Unplaced		
Can Sandikcioglu directorship — a franchise holder to Miss Universe between 1980 and 2022
Did not compete in 2023
2022	Istanbul	Aleyna Şirin	Unplaced		
2021	Istanbul	Cemrenaz Turhan	Unplaced		
Due to the impact of COVID-19 pandemic, no representative in 2020
2019	Istanbul	Bilgi Aydoğmuş	Unplaced		
2018	Istanbul	Tara Madelein de Vries	Unplaced		
2017	İzmir	Pınar Tartan	Unplaced		During Miss Turkey grand finale, Pinar won Miss Turkey Supranational 2017 but some hours later she announced as the winner of Miss Turkey Universe 2017.
2016	Istanbul	Tansu Sıla Çakır	Unplaced		
2015	Ankara	Aslı Melisa Uzun	Unplaced		
2014	Sivas	Dilan Çiçek Deniz	Unplaced		
2013	Istanbul	Berrin Keklikler	Unplaced		
2012	Ankara	Çağıl Özge Özkul	Top 16		
2011	Hatay	Melisa Aslı Pamuk	Unplaced		
2010	Ankara	Gizem Memiç	Unplaced		
2009	İzmir	Senem Kuyucuoğlu	Unplaced		
2008	Samsun	Sinem Sülün	Unplaced		Took over Begüm's position — Sinem was Miss Turkey Universe 2007 who canceled her participant at Miss Universe 2007 in Mexico.
2008	Istanbul	Begüm Kızıltuğ	Did not compete		Withdrew, for personal reasons before coming to Miss Universe 2008 in Vietnam — Last winner of 2007, Sinem Sülün who did not compete at Miss Universe 2007 replaced to be sent to upcoming season in Vietnam.
2007	Samsun	Sinem Sülün	Did not compete		Allocated to Miss Universe 2008.
2006	İzmir	Ceyla Kirazlı	Unplaced		
2005	İzmir	Dilek Aksoy	Unplaced		
2004	İzmir	Fatoş Seğmen	Unplaced		
2003	Ankara	Özge Ulusoy	Unplaced		
2002	İzmir	Çağla Kubat	Unplaced		
2001	Adana	Sedef Avcı	Unplaced		
2000	Ankara	Cansu Dere	Did not compete		Withdrew, due to political issues between Turkey and Cyprus (Host of Miss Universe 2000); Turkey had no relations with the Republic of Cyprus.
1999	Istanbul	Öznur Dursun	Unplaced		
1998	Istanbul	Asuman Krause	Unplaced	Miss Congeniality	
1997	Istanbul	Yeşim Çetin	Unplaced		
1996	Ankara	Serpil Sevilay Öztürk	Unplaced		
1995	Istanbul	Gamze Saygı	Unplaced		
1994	Istanbul	Banu Usluer	Unplaced		
1993	Istanbul	İpek Gümüşoğlu	Unplaced	Best National Costume (2nd Runner-up)	
1992	Istanbul	Elif Ilgaz	Unplaced		
1991	Ankara	Pınar Özdemir	Unplaced		
1990	Elazığ	Jülide Ateş	Top 10		
1989	Istanbul	Jasmin Baradan	Unplaced		
1988	Istanbul	Meltem Hakarar	Unplaced		
1987	İzmir	Leyla Şeşbeş	Unplaced		
1986	Istanbul	Demet Başdemir	Unplaced		Designation — A Runner-up took over to compete at Miss Universe 1986.
1986	Ankara	Meltem Doğanay	Did not compete		Allocated to Miss World 1986.
Did not compete in 1985
1984	Istanbul	Gülçin Ülker	Unplaced		
1983	Istanbul	Dilara Haraççı	Unplaced		
1983	Balıkesir	Hülya Avşar	Did not compete		Dethroned.
1982	Istanbul	Canan Emine Kakmacı	Unplaced		
1981	Ankara	Şenay Ünlü	Unplaced		
1980	Istanbul	Heyecan Gökoğlu	Unplaced		
Özcan Sandıkçıoğlu directorship — a franchise holder to Miss Universe between 1952 and 1979
1979	Ankara	Füsan Tahire Dermitaş	Unplaced		
1978	Istanbul	Billur Lütfiye Bingöl	Unplaced		
Did not compete in 1977
1976	Istanbul	Manolya Onur	Unplaced		
1975	Istanbul	Sezin Topçuoğlu	Unplaced		
1974	Istanbul	Simiten Gakirgoz	Unplaced		
1973	Istanbul	Yıldız Arhan	Unplaced		
1972	Eskişehir	Neslihan Sunay	Unplaced		
1971	Istanbul	Filiz Vural	Unplaced		
1970	Istanbul	Asuman Tuğberk	Unplaced		
1969	Istanbul	Azra Balkan	Unplaced		
1968	Istanbul	Zumal Aktan	Unplaced		
1967	Istanbul	Yelda Gürani	Unplaced		
1966	Istanbul	Nilgün Arslaner	Unplaced		
1965	Samsun	Hilal Nebahat Çehre	Unplaced		
1964	Istanbul	İnci Duran	Unplaced		
1963	Istanbul	Güler Samuray	Unplaced		
1962	Istanbul	Behad Gülay Sezer	Unplaced		
1961	Istanbul	Gülseren Uysal	Unplaced		
1960	Istanbul	Figen Ozgurun	Did not compete		
1959	Istanbul	Ezel Olcay	Unplaced		
Did not compete in 1958
1957	Istanbul	Güler Sirmen	Unplaced		
1956	Istanbul	Can Uysaloğlu	Unplaced		
1955	Istanbul	Suna Soley	Did not compete		
1954	Istanbul	Sibel Göksel	Did not compete		
1953	Istanbul	Ayten Akyol	Top 16		
1952	Ankara	Gelengül Tayfuroğlu	Unplaced		
