= Top Model Türkiye =

Turkish reality TV competition

Top Model Türkiye (English: Top Model Turkey) is a Turkish reality TV competition produced by D Productions, broadcast by Star TV and part of the Top Model series created by Tyra Banks. The show was cancelled after the first season due to low ratings. It was won by Selda Car. Şeyma Subaşı and Senem Kuyucuoğlu, two other finalists, have gone on to become prominent models, with Kuyucuoğlu finishing second at the 2009 Miss Turkey national pageant, and representing her nation at the 2009 Miss Universe pageant.

== The competition ==
Auditions were held across several Turkish provinces. Out of 20 shortlisted, 12 were selected by the jury to enter the final and moved to a luxury villa in Zekeriyaköy.

== Judges ==
- Deniz Akkaya (Host)
- Uġurkan Erez
- Cengiz Abazoġlu

== Cycles ==
Cycle	Premiere date	Winner	Runner-up	Other contestants in order of elimination	Number of contestants	International Destinations
1	17 August 2006	Selda Car	Yağmur Eren	Eda Köse, Güneş Öznek, Meral Bayram, Merve Şendil, Nurcan Altınoluk, Göksun Uzun, Gözde Çetin, Senem Kuyucuoğlu, Songül Yıldırım, Şeyma Subaşı	12	Milan

== Top Model Türkiye ==
=== Contestants ===
(ages stated at start of contest)

Name	Age	Height	Finish	Place
Eda Köse	22	1.78 m (5 ft 10 in)	Episode 2	12
Güneş Öznek	21	1.79 m (5 ft 10 1/2 in)	Episode 3	11
Meral Bayram	23	1.81 m (5 ft 11 1/2 in)	Episode 4	10
Merve Şendil	16	1.74 m (5 ft 8 1/2 in)	Episode 5	9
Nurcan Altınoluk	17	1.70 m (5 ft 7 in)	Episode 6	8
Göksun Uzun	20	1.75 m (5 ft 9 in)	Episode 7	7
Gözde Çetin	19	1.75 m (5 ft 9 in)	Episode 8	6
Senem Kuyucuoğlu	16	1.85 m (6 ft 1 in)	Episode 9	5
Songül Yıldırım	18	1.82 m (5 ft 11 1/2 in)	Episode 10	4
Şeyma Subaşı	16	1.74 m (5 ft 8 1/2 in)	Episode 11	3
Yağmur Eren	18	1.80 m (5 ft 11 in)	Episode 11	2
Selda Car	22	1.77 m (5 ft 9 1/2 in)	Episode 11	1

=== Call-out order ===
Order	Episodes											
Order	1	2	3	4	5	6	7	8	9	10	11	
1	Göksun	Yağmur	Yağmur	Gözde	Selda	Şeyma	Senem	Şeyma	Selda	Yağmur	Selda	Selda
2	Merve	Songül	Gözde	Yağmur	Gözde	Göksun	Şeyma	Songül	Songül	Şeyma	Yağmur	Yağmur
3	Şeyma	Göksun	Songül	Selda	Şeyma	Songül	Yağmur	Senem	Şeyma	Selda	Şeyma	
4	Eda	Nurcan	Şeyma	Nurcan	Senem	Selda	Selda	Selda	Yağmur	Songül		
5	Selda	Selda	Merve	Şeyma	Nurcan	Yağmur	Gözde	Yağmur	Senem			
6	Nurcan	Meral	Meral	Senem	Yağmur	Gözde	Songül	Gözde				
7	Senem	Güneş	Selda	Songül	Göksun	Senem	Göksun					
8	Güneş	Gözde	Nurcan	Merve	Songül	Nurcan						
9	Yağmur	Senem	Göksun	Göksun	Merve							
10	Songül	Merve	Senem	Meral								
11	Meral	Şeyma	Güneş									
12	Gözde	Eda										

The contestant was eliminated
The contestant won the competition
