= Saçan =

Saçan is a Turkish surname. Notable people with the surname include:

- Adil Serdar Saçan (1962–2023), Turkish police chief
- Erdinç Saçan (born 1979), Dutch internet entrepreneur, columnist, and politician
