= Tolgahan =

Tolgahan is a Turkish given name for males. Notable people with the name include:

- Tolgahan Acar (born 1986), Turkish footballer
- Tolgahan Çiçek (born 1995), Dutch-born Turkish footballer
- Tolgahan Çoğulu (born 1978), Turkish classical guitarist
- Tolgahan Sayışman (born 1981), Turkish film actor
