= Gizem Memiç =

Turkish model (born 1990)

- Born: Gizem Memiç; May 16, 1990 (age 36); Ankara, Turkey
- Height: 1.78 m (5 ft 10 in)
- Beauty pageant titleholder
- Title: Miss Turkey 2010
- Major competitions: Miss Turkey 2010 (winner); Miss Universe 2010 (unplaced)

Gizem Memiç (Turkish: [ˈɡizem ˈmemitʃ]; (born May 16, 1990) is a Turkish model and beauty pageant titleholder who won the title of Miss Turkey 2010 on 1 April 2010. She graduated from Interior Architecture & Environmental Design at Bilkent University.

== Beauty contests ==
=== Miss Universe 2010 ===
Memiç competed in Miss Universe 2010 held in Las Vegas, Nevada on August 23, 2010.

=== Miss World 2010 ===
As the official representative of Turkey in the 2010 Miss World pageant held in Sanya, China, Memiç became one of the Top 40 semifinalists during the Miss World Beach Beauty fast track event held on October 19 and a Top 20 finalist in Miss World Sports, held on October 22, 2010.

== Commercial work ==
As "Miss Turkey" she was in a 2011 American television commercial for Carl's Jr. restaurant and its sibling Hardee's restaurants, promoting their new broiled turkey burger. Memiç is seen in a bikini that features small images of the turkey burger. Strolling down a walkway, she is eating one of the burgers.

Awards and achievements
Preceded by Ebru Şam	Miss Turkey; 2010	Succeeded by Melisa Aslı Pamuk
