= Hazal Subaşı =

Turkish actress

- Born: 2 May 1995 (age 31); İzmir, Turkey
- Occupations: Actress, model
- Years active: 2016–present
- Awards: Miss Turkey 2015 – 3rd place

Hazal Subaşı (born 2 May 1995) is a Turkish actress, model and beauty pageant titleholder who won Miss Turkey Supranational 2015 and represented her country at Miss Supranational 2015.

== Life and career ==
Hazal Subaşı was born on 2 May 1995 in İzmir, Turkey. After Ottoman Empire collapsed, her family, of Turkish descent, immigrated from Thessaloniki (now in Greece). After getting a degree in Public Relations and Advertising from İzmir University of Economics, Subaşı competed in Miss Turkey 2015 and earned the third place. Soon she started taking acting lessons.

== Filmography ==
=== Streaming movies and series ===
| Year | Title | Role | Notes |
|---|---|---|---|
| 2021 | Bizi Ayıran Çizgi | Sinem Eğilmez | GAİN |
| 2022 | Sıcak Kafa | Şule Eryılmaz | Netflix |
| 2023 | 10 Days of a Bad Man | Gülhan Köseoğlu | Netflix |
| 2024 | 10 Days of a Curious Man | Gülhan Köseoğlu | Netflix |
| 2024 | İlk ve Son | Nilüfer Alaca | BluTV |

=== TV series ===
| Year | Title | Role | Notes |
|---|---|---|---|
| 2016–2018 | Adını Sen Koy | Zehra Kaya Kervancıoğlu | Leading role |
| 2018 | Bir Umut Yeter | Elif Özkan Karabey | Leading role |
| 2019 | Halka | Bahar Berkes | Leading role |
| 2019–2021 | Çukur | Nehir Bursalı | Joined |
| 2022–2023 | Kasaba Doktoru | Leyla Erpek | Leading role |
| 2023–2024 | Dilek Taşı | Figen Kutlu | Leading role |
| 2024-2026 | Sahipsizler | Azize | Leading role |

== Awards ==
| Year | Award | Category |
|---|---|---|
| 2015 | Miss Turkey | Third place |
| 2018 | Cyprus Havadis Media Awards | Best Actress of the Year |
| 2022 | 26. Golden Lens Awards (MGD) | Drama Adapted Series Actress of the Year |
