= Mahmure Birsen Sakaoğlu =

Mahmure Birsen Sakaoğlu (1909 – 17 December 2003) was a Turkish beauty pageant titleholder and physician.

== Private life ==
Mahmure Birsen adopted the surname İzmirli after the Surname Law of 1934. She was crowned Miss Turkey in the beauty pageant, she participated in 1936. After completion of her university education in Medicine, she starting working as a general practitioner. She married Mustafa Sakaoğlu, also a physician. The couple went to the United States, where they lived for seven years. The family had no children. Mustafa died in September 1999. While living alone she experienced a fire in her home at Fatih, Istanbul in 2000. The bed-confined old woman was rescued by firefighters, who were able to enter her apartment in an upper floor and carry her outside. This was her second fire experience after 87 years, after the first when she was a aged four.

== Testament, death and trials ==
Following the fire, she wanted to do a favor to the firefighters, who saved her life. For this purpose, she asked her brother, retired Colonel Ahmet Selahattin İzmirli, for assistance, received, however, a negative response. She then contacted deputy governor of Istanbul Province for help. On 3 May 2000, she dictated her testament in presence of two physician witnesses at a notary public, Bakırköy, Istanbul. Her testament stated that the interest of her bank deposit and the rental income from the property that she used as a residence, will be distributed to all 263 personnel of the fire brigade in Fatih regardless of their rank in equal amount in every three months. Furthermore, she expressed her will that an automobile is to be purchased to her adoptive son Mustafa Bakır, and he receives an amount sufficient for his subsistence level. After the death of any firefighter or her adoptive son, the interest would be distributed to all other living people. She excluded her brother from her heritage.

Sakaoğlu died at the age of 94 on 17 December 2003. Her inheritors applied to the court for the determination of her heritage. The court ruled that heritage was to be distributed in total of six shares as: two shares to her brother, two shares to niece Semiramis Aydınlık, one share to nephew Vedat Sinan Pamukçu and one share to niece Günseli Selma Pamukçu. However, in the meantime, the testament came to view, and the court's rule was cancelled. Her brother and four other relatives filed objections. The court case for the annulment of the testament lasted 14 years. During this period her brother also died. His two daughters, Oya Tanju Özışık and Fatma Figen İzmirli, took part in the case. In 2018, the court rejected the case on annulment of testament, and ruled that the testament would be effective in favor of the personnel of the Fatih Fire Brigade and five people named in the testament.
