= Feriha Tevfik =

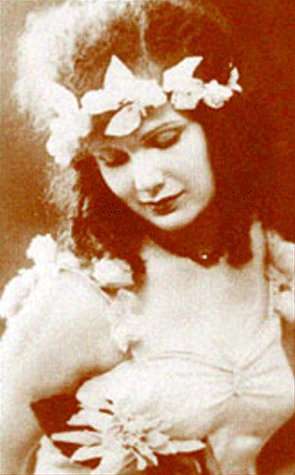
- Born: 1911; Istanbul, Ottoman Empire
- Died: 22 April 1991 (aged 79–80)
- Modelling information
- Hair colour: Black
- Eye colour: Brown

Feriha Tevfik Dağ (née Negüz; 1911 – 22 April 1991) was a Turkish beauty pageant contestant and actress. She was best known for being the first Miss Turkey (1929). She participated again in the pageant in 1932 and finished second after Keriman Halis.

== Filmography ==
Year	Film
1933	Kaçakçılar
1933	Karım beni aldatırsa
1934	Milyon avcıları
1934	Leblebici Horhor Ağa
1934	Aysel Bataklı Damın Kızı
1939	Bir kavuk devrildi
1939	Allah'ın cenneti
1939	Tosun Paşa

== Sources ==
Awards
New title Competition established	Miss Turkey; 1929	Succeeded by Mübeccel Namık
