= Alper Göbel =

Dutch footballer

Personal information
- Date of birth: 11 October 1982 (age 44)
- Place of birth: Deventer, Netherlands
- Height: 1.77 m (5 ft 10 in)
- Position: Right-back

Senior career*
Years	Team	Apps	(Gls)
2004–2008	Go Ahead Eagles	112	(3)
2008–2009	Den Bosch	33	(0)
2009	Göztepe	0	(0)
2010–2011	Spakenburg		
2011–2012	SVZW	20	(0)
2012–2013	DETO	7	(0)
Total		172	(3)
- * Club domestic league appearances and goals

Alper Göbel (born 11 October 1982) is a Dutch retired footballer who played as a right-back.

== Career ==
Göbel started his career with Dutch second division side Go Ahead Eagles, where he made 116 appearances and scored 3 goals and received interest from the Turkish top flight. On 17 December 2004, Göbel debuted for Go Ahead Eagles during a 2–2 draw with Sparta (Rotterdam). On 9 February 2007, scored his first goal for Go Ahead Eagles during a 4–0 win over FC Eindhoven. In 2009, Göbel signed for Göztepe in the Turkish third division, where he said, "I was sitting at the window and suddenly a boulder flew through the window, glass everywhere. We were pelted from all sides, while police also drove in front of and behind the bus. Moments later, an ax flew right through the window. Thanks to the driver, who kept driving, we made it out alive. There was much panic and much blood. I was sick of it. Our team manager got something in his eye and is now half blind. In Turkey that made the national news, because even for them this was exceptional." Before the second half of 2010–11, he signed for Dutch fourth division club Spakenburg.

He moved from SVZW to fellow amateurs DETO in 2012.
