= Ali Ulusoy =

Dutch footballer

Personal information
- Date of birth: 15 February 1996 (age 30)
- Place of birth: Rotterdam
- Height: 1.77 m (5 ft 10 in)
- Position: Right back

Youth career
- 2003–2015: Feyenoord
- 2015–2016: FC Utrecht

Senior career*
Years	Team	Apps	(Gls)
2016–2017	FC Utrecht	0	(0)
2016–2017	→ Jong Utrecht	29	(0)
2017–2018	FC Volendam	2	(0)
2019	SV Heimstetten	12	(0)
- * Club domestic league appearances and goals as of 23:06, 16 May 2019 (UTC)

Ali Ulusoy (born 15 February 1996) is a Dutch football player of Turkish descent who most recently played for SV Heimstetten.

== Club career ==
He made his professional debut in the Eerste Divisie for Jong FC Utrecht on 5 August 2016 in a game against NAC Breda.
