= Altan Erdogan =

Dutch journalist (born 1967)

Altan Erdogan (born 29 June 1967, in Amsterdam) is a Dutch journalist. He is the former editor of the Dutch weekly magazine Nieuwe Revu.

== Life and career ==
Erdogan was born to a Turkish father and a Dutch mother. After his journalism studies at the School of Journalism in Utrecht, he worked as a reporter and editor for the Haarlem Dagblad, Het Parool and De Volkskrant. From 2002 he was managing editor and deputy of Times Magazine. In December 2007 he was the first foreign editor of a national magazine in the Netherlands.

In the years 2007-2010 Erdogan served as editor-in-chief of Nieuwe Revu. He changed the name to Revu but his successor, Frans Loman, changed it right back. In the Erdogan years the circulation of Nieuwe Revu dropped from 64,360 to 46,619 (by 28%), but this was not different from the previous and subsequent years.

Subsequent to Nieuwe Revu, Erdogan worked for the Dutch broadcasters VARA and PowNed. From 2015 to 2021 he edited Folia, the free student and staff magazine of the University of Amsterdam.

After his stint with the student newspaper he was announced as the editor in chief for the Amsterdam television station AT5. He started in October 2021.
