= Nieuwe Revu =

Dutch general interest magazine

The Nieuwe Revu is a weekly general interest magazine from the Netherlands, published on Wednesdays and written in Dutch.

== History and profile ==
In the 1970s the magazine was explicitly left-winged and focused on sport, sex, sensation and socialism.

In July 2014 the magazine was sold by Sanoma to Pijper Media in Groningen.

== Editors-in-chief ==
- 1968-1975: Albert Welling
- 1975: Jaap Velt
- 1975-1977: Ton van Dijk
- 1977-1981: Hans Wilbrink, Hans Waleveld, Ger Ackermans
- 1981-1982 Fons Burger
- 1982-1989: Derk Sauer
- 1989-2000: Hans Verstraaten
- 2001-2004: Jildou van der Bijl
- 2004-2005: Mark Koster
- 2005-2006: Hans Verstraaten
- 2006-2007: Jan Paul de Wildt
- 2007: Fred Sengers
- 2007-2010: Altan Erdogan
- 2010-2011: Frans Lomans
- 2011-2012: Gert-Jaap Hoekman and Willem Uylenbroek
- 2012-2015: Erik Noomen
- Since 2015: Marijn Schrijver

== Circulation ==
- 1968: 280,000
- 1971: 181,000
- 1980: 219,000
- 1990: 163,374
- 2000: 111,084
- 2005: 70,208
- 2006: 68,562 (-2.3%)
- 2007: 64,360 (-6.1%)
- 2008: 63,439 (-1.4%)
- 2009: 46,619 (-26.5%)
- 2010: 40,415 (-1.3%)
- 2011: 34,589 (-14.4%)
- 2012: 32,529 (-6.0%)
- 2013: 23,807 (-26.8%)
