= Cemal Yilmaz =

Dutch footballer (born 1968)

Personal information
- Date of birth: 1 October 1968 (age 58)
- Place of birth: Turkey
- Position: Midfielder

Youth career
- Willem II

Senior career*
Years	Team	Apps	(Gls)
1987–1989	PSV Eindhoven	4	(0)
1989	Sarıyer		
1990–1995	RBC Roosendaal		
- * Club domestic league appearances and goals

Cemal Yilmaz (born 1 October 1968) is a Dutch former professional footballer who played as a midfielder.

== Career ==
Yilmaz started his career with Dutch top flight side PSV Eindhoven, where he made four league appearances. On 5 December 1987, he made his debut for PSV in a 7–0 win over FC Dordrecht. In 1989, Yilmaz signed for Sarıyer in the Turkish top flight. In 1990, he signed for Dutch second-tier club RBC Roosendaal.
