= Ceyla Kirazlı =

Turkish model and beauty pageant titleholder

Ceyla Kirazlı (born c. 1986) is a Turkish model and beauty pageant titleholder who was crowned Miss Universe Turkey 2006 and represented her country at the Miss Universe 2006 pageant in Los Angeles, California. Her interests include traditional dances, traveling, backgammon, swimming, music, and volleyball. Growing up in İzmir, she stands at 5' 10" and admires Atatürk, the founder of the modern Turkish Republic. Her ambition is to be a world-famous model.
