= Çağıl Özge Özkul =

Turkish TV host and model

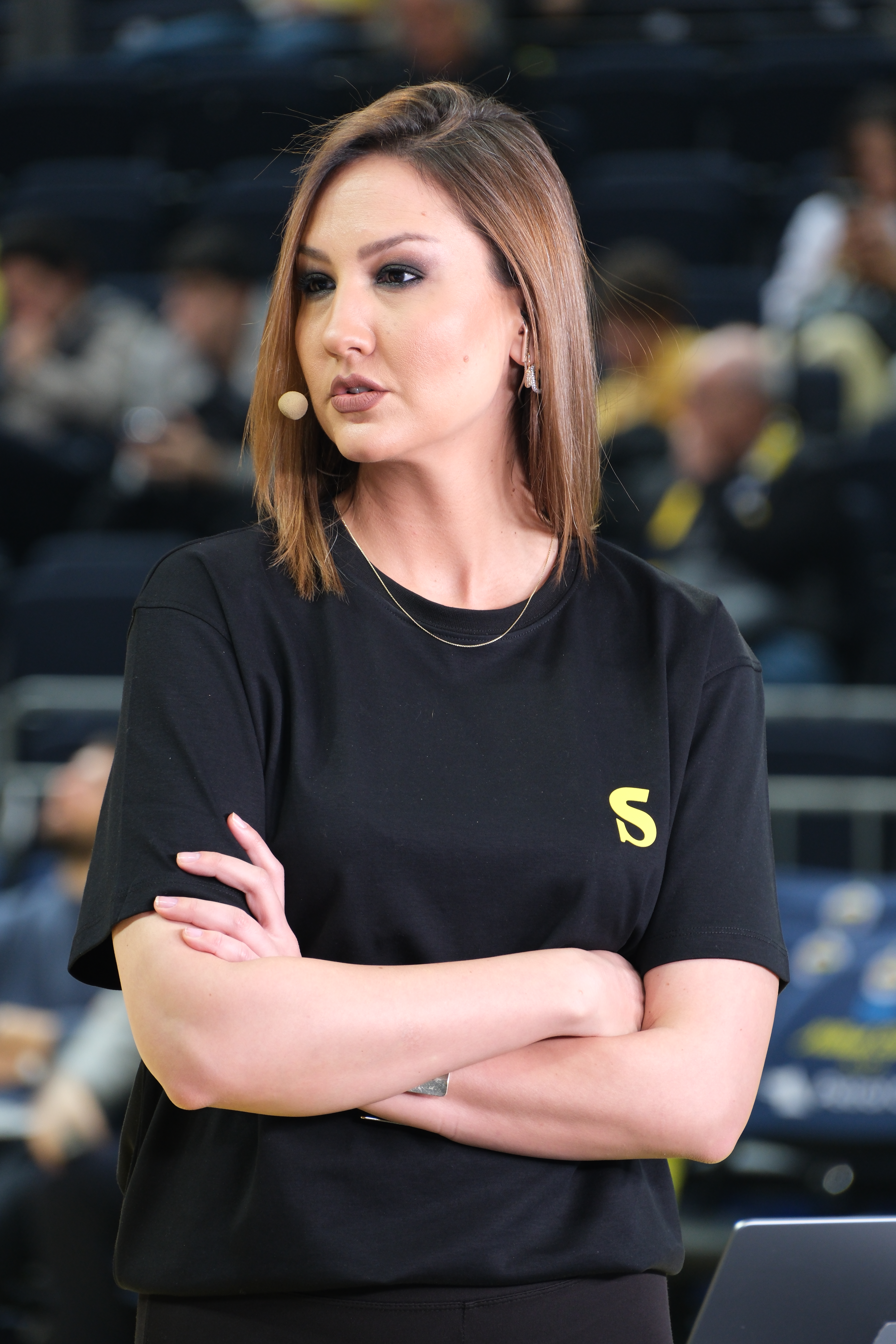
- Born: Çağıl Özge Özkul; September 27, 1988 (age 38); Ankara, Turkey
- Height: 1.80 m (5 ft 11 in)
- Beauty pageant titleholder
- Title: Miss Turkey Universe 2012
- Hair color: Brown
- Eye color: Brown
- Major competitions: Miss Turkey Universe 2012 (Winner); Miss Universe 2012 (Top 16)

Çağıl Özge Özkul (born September 27, 1988) is a Turkish television host, model and beauty pageant titleholder who was crowned Miss Turkey Universe 2012 and represented her country at the 2012 Miss Universe pageant.

== Early life ==
Çağıl Özge Özkul studied economics at Ankara Atılım University.

== Miss Turkey 2012 and Miss Universe 2012 ==
Çağıl Özge Özkul won the Miss Universe Turkey 2012 title at the Lutfi Kirdar Convention and Exhibition Center on 31 May 2012. She represented Turkey in Miss Universe 2012 which was held in Las Vegas on December 19 where she broke a 22-year drought by placing in the Top 16.

She is a TV presenter and sports anchor for S Sport.

Awards and achievements
Preceded by Melisa Aslı Pamuk	Miss Turkey; 2012	Succeeded by Berrin Keklikler
