= Emir Biberoğlu =

Dutch-Turkish footballer (born 2001)

Emır Bıberoğlu
Personal information
- Date of birth: 20 May 2001 (age 25)
- Place of birth: Amsterdam, Netherlands
- Height: 1.80 m (5 ft 11 in)
- Position: Midfielder

Youth career
- 2005–2014: RKSV Pancratius
- 2014–2016: AFC
- 2016–2020: AZ

Senior career*
| Years | Team | Apps | (Gls) |
| 2020–2021 | Jong AZ | 10 | (0) |
| 2021–2022 | Dordrecht | 22 | (0) |
| 2022–2023 | İskenderunspor | 5 | (0) |

International career
| 2017 | Turkey U17 | 6 | (2) |
| 2020 | Turkey U19 | 2 | (0) |
- * Club domestic league appearances and goals as of 13 December 2023

Emir Biberoğlu (born 20 May 2001) is a professional footballer who plays as a midfielder. Born in the Netherlands, he has represented Turkey at youth international level.

== Club career ==
A youth academy graduate of AZ, Biberoğlu made his professional debut for Jong AZ on 21 September 2020 in a 7–3 league win against De Graafschap.

On 9 July 2021, Dordrecht announced the signing of eight players including Biberoğlu after trials. His contract was terminated by mutual consent on 5 August 2022, as his prospects of playing time were severely diminished.

On 9 August 2022, Biberoğlu signed a two-year contract with İskenderunspor in the third-tier TFF Second League.

== International career ==
Biberoğlu is a current Turkish youth national team player.

== Career statistics ==
=== Club ===
As of match played 17 January 2022

Appearances and goals by club, season and competition
| Club | Season | League | | | Cup | | Continental | | Other | | Total | |
| Club | Season | Division | Apps | Goals | Apps | Goals | Apps | Goals | Apps | Goals | Apps | Goals |
|---|---|---|---|---|---|---|---|---|---|---|---|---|
| Jong AZ | 2020–21 | Eerste Divisie | 10 | 0 | — | | — | | — | | 10 | 0 |
| Dordrecht | 2021–22 | Eerste Divisie | 18 | 0 | 1 | 0 | — | | 0 | 0 | 19 | 0 |
| Career total | | | 28 | 0 | 1 | 0 | — | | 0 | 0 | 29 | 0 |
