= Ömer Sepici =

Turkish-Dutch footballer (born 1987)

Personal information
- Full name: Ömer Sepici
- Date of birth: September 30, 1987 (age 39)
- Place of birth: The Hague, Netherlands
- Height: 1.89 m (6 ft 2 1/2 in)
- Position: Goalkeeper

Youth career
- Rvc/Rijswijk

Senior career*
Years	Team	Apps	(Gls)
2006–2007	Ankaragücü	0	(0)
2007–2009	Gebzespor	4	(0)
2009–2012	Keçiörengücü	90	(0)
2012–2013	Fethiyespor	2	(0)
2013–2014	Ünyespor	19	(0)
- * Club domestic league appearances and goals as of 17 September 2015

Ömer Sepici (born September 30, 1987, in The Hague) is a Turkish football player who was born and grew up in the Netherlands. He last played as a goalkeeper for Ünyespor in the TFF Third League.
