= Tolgahan Çiçek =

Dutch-Turkish association football player

Personal information
- Full name: Tolgahan Mulla Çiçek
- Date of birth: 19 June 1995 (age 31)
- Place of birth: Delfzijl, Netherlands
- Height: 1.78 m (5 ft 10 in)
- Position: Left back

Team information
- Current team: Osmaniyespor FK
- Number: 46

Youth career
- VV Appingedam
- 2006–2014: Groningen
- 2014–2017: De Graafschap

Senior career*
Years	Team	Apps	(Gls)
2014–2017	De Graafschap	39	(0)
2017–2018	Adana Demirspor	12	(0)
2019–2020	Nevşehir Belediyespor	13	(0)
2020–2021	Niğde Anadolu	26	(0)
2021–2022	Modafen	2	(0)
2022	Hacettepe	14	(0)
2022–2023	Osmaniyespor	2	(0)

International career
2009–2010	Netherlands U15	5	(0)
2016	Turkey U21	4	(0)
- * Club domestic league appearances and goals as of 13 November 2022

Tolgahan Mulla Çiçek (born 19 June 1995) is a professional footballer who plays as a left back for TFF Third League side Osmaniyespor FK. Born in the Netherlands, he represented Turkey at under-21 international level.

== Club career ==
From 2014, Çiçek was part of the first team of De Graafschap, who signed him from the youth academy of Groningen. On 16 August 2014, Çiçek made his professional debut by filling in for Caner Cavlan eight minutes before the final whistle against Almere City. On 25 September, he made his first start in the cup match against DOSKO. In the 2017–18 season he played for Adana Demirspor. In August 2019, he moved to Nevşehir Belediyespor in the TFF Third League. After a year, he signed with Niğde Anadolu playing in the TFF Second League.

== International career ==
Tolgahan is born in Netherlands to parents of Turkish descent, and originally represented the Netherlands U15 team. However, he later represented the Turkey U21 team and made his debut in a 1–0 loss to the Cyprus U21s.
