= Melisa Aslı Pamuk =

Miss Turkey 2011, actress and model (born 1991)

Melisa Aslı Yazıcı
- Born: Melisa Aslı Pamuk; 14 April 1991 (age 35); Haarlem, Netherlands
- Height: 178 cm (5 ft 10 in)
- Spouse: Yusuf Yazıcı (m. 2024)
- Children: 1
- Beauty pageant titleholder
- Title: Miss Turkey 2011
- Agency: Cem Tatlıtuğ Agency; Caner Sipahi Casting Agency
- Hair color: Brown
- Eye color: Brown
- Major competitions: Miss Turkey 2011 (winner); Miss Universe 2011 (unplaced)

Melisa Aslı Yazıcı (née Pamuk, Turkish: [meɫisa asɫɯ pamuk]; born 14 April 1991) is a Dutch-Turkish actress, model and beauty pageant titleholder. Her family is from İskenderun, Hatay, Turkey. She won the title of Miss Turkey 2011 on 2 June 2011. Pamuk accepted the crown from Gizem Memiç, the Miss Turkey 2010 beauty pageant titleholder. She enrolled on a Psychology degree at University of Amsterdam but abandoned it later due to her desire to focus on her modeling career. She also won the title of "Best Promising" in Best Model of Turkey 2009.

== Biography ==
Melisa Aslı Pamuk was born on 14 April 1991 in the Netherlands. She started her acting career when she was 13 years old, and her model career when she was 14 years old. She became "Promising Model of the Future" (Umut/Gelecek Vaat Eden Model) in 2009 Best Model of Turkey competition. She became Miss Turkey in 2011. She represented Turkey in 2011 Miss Universe competition in São Paulo, Brazil. In order to improve her acting skills, she took acting lessons at Sadri Alışık Culture Center. She made her debut with her role in popular Turkish drama Love in the Sky (Yer Gök Aşk).

== Filmography ==
=== Film ===
Year	Title	Role	Notes
2004	Dat zit wel snor	Hayal	Leading role
2012	G.D.O. KaraKedi	Elmas	Leading role
2021	Karanlık Şehir Hikayeleri: Kilit	Benal Erendik	Leading role
2022	Garip Bülbül Neşet Ertaş	Beyhan	Leading role
2024	Scotoe	Esra	Supporting role

=== Television ===
Year	Title	Role	Notes	Network
2010–2013	Yer Gök Aşk	Sevda Arcaoğlu	Leading role	FOX
2014	Kurt Seyit ve Şura	Ayşe Dinçer	Leading role	Star TV
2014	Her Sevda Bir Veda	Azade Payidar	Leading role	Show TV
2014–2015	Ulan İstanbul	Zeynep	Leading role	Kanal D
2015–2017	Kara Sevda	Asu Kozcuoğlu	Leading role	Star TV
2018–2019	Çarpışma	Cemre Gür	Leading role	Show TV
2020	Yeni Hayat	Yasemin Karatan	Leading role	Kanal D
2021	Kırmızı Oda	Mitra Şerifi	Guest appearance	TV8
2022	Hayaller ve Hayatlar	Setenay	Leading role	BeIN Connect
2023	EGO	Sibel Koraslan	Leading role	FOX
2023	Hay Sultan	Sofya	Leading role	tabii

Awards and achievements
Preceded by Gizem Memiç	Miss Turkey; 2011	Succeeded by Çağıl Özge Özkul
