= Erdinç Saçan =

Erdinç Saçan (born 12 May 1979) is a Dutch internet entrepreneur, website administrator, columnist and politician for the PvdA.

Saçan was born in 's-Hertogenbosch. After studying management and data processing at the Fontys college, he established his eponymous company Saçan Consultancy. At the same time, he founded several websites dealing with politics and the position of Turks in the Netherlands. He was elected member of the States-Provincial of North Brabant. In 2006, he was nominated as a candidate for the Dutch House of Representatives but withdrew as a result of his denial of the Armenian genocide.

== Armenian genocide denial ==
According to the newspaper Trouw, Saçan clearly stated in a chat box of one of his websites that he denied the Armenian genocide of 1915. PvdA-management asked him to explain this when his comments became public following similar controversial statements of CDA. His first stance was to follow the PvdA-position (that the event was a genocide). Two days later however, on 26 September 2006, Saçan declared he still denied the genocide and withdrew his candidacy of the PvdA. Nebahat Albayrak, number 2 on the PvdA-election list, indicated on behalf of the PvdA that the party should no longer "turn around" the actions surrounding the event and called for a reevaluation of the facts (jointly by Armenia and Turkey) because "all sources had become unclear". Saçan's seat at the States-Provincial was not under discussion; and he declared to be against any form of violence (also genocide).
