= Senem Kuyucuoğlu =

Turkish model (born 1990)

- Born: 22 September 1990 (age 36); İzmir, Turkey
- Height: 1.87 m (6 ft 1 1/2 in)
- Beauty pageant titleholder
- Title: Miss Turkey Universe 2009; Miss Model of Turkey 2007
- Hair color: Chestnut brown
- Eye color: Brown

Senem Kuyucuoğlu (born 22 September 1990) is a Turkish tv host, model and beauty pageant titleholder who won the Best Model of Turkey 2007 and Miss Turkey 2009 first runner-up titles. Since her debut, Kuyucuoğlu has been the face of a variety of advertising campaigns in Turkey.

== Career ==
Kuyucuoğlu began modelling at the age of 14. She also participated in "Top Model Türkiye" which is the Turkish version of the worldwide known "Next Top Model" format and finished second in 2006. In 2007, she won the "Best Model of Turkey" competition and participated at the "Best Model of the World". She competed in the Miss Universe 2009 pageant after holding the runner-up Miss Turkey 2009 title. She was chosen third in Boxer Magazine's list of the 50 sexiest women in Turkey. She is also a TV-presenter for the Fashion One TV in Turkey.
