= Tara De Vries =

Turkish-Dutch beauty pageant titleholder

- Born: Tara Madelein De Vries; 6 October 1998 (age 28); Amsterdam, Netherlands
- Height: 5 ft 10 in (178 cm)
- Beauty pageant titleholder
- Title: Miss Universe Turkey 2018
- Major competitions: Miss Universe 2018 (Unplaced)

Tara Madelein De Vries (born 6 October 1998) is a Turkish-Dutch model and beauty pageant titleholder who won Miss Turkey Universe 2018. She represented Turkey in Miss Universe 2018. De Vries was born in the Netherlands to a Dutch father and Turkish mother, and moved to Turkey at age 12. She studies economics and administration at Koç University.

Her mother, Özlem Kaymaz, was also crowned Miss Turkey in 1992.

Awards and achievements
Preceded by Pınar Tartan	Miss Universe Turkey; 2018	Succeeded by Bilgi Nur Aydoğmuş
