= Miss Turkey =

Beauty pageant

- Türkiye Güzellik Kraliçesi
- Formation: 1929; 97 years ago
- Type: Beauty pageant
- Headquarters: Istanbul
- Location: Turkey
- Members: Miss World; Miss International; Miss Supranational
- Official language: Turkish
- Website: missturkey.com.tr

The Miss Turkey (Turkish: Türkiye Güzellik Kraliçesi) is a national beauty pageant in Turkey. The pageant was founded in 1929, where the winners titled as Miss Turkey World, and Miss Turkey Supranational.

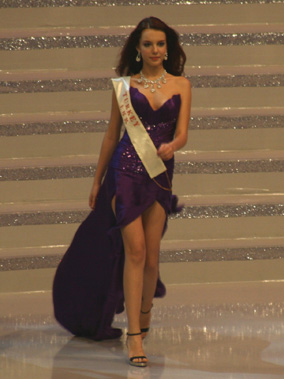
Selen Soyder, Miss Turkey 2007 titleholder

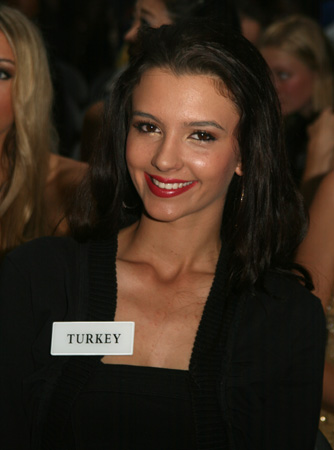
Leyla Lydia Tuğutlu, Miss Turkey 2008 titleholder

== History ==
The Miss Turkey pageant was initially promoted by the newspaper Cumhuriyet. Since 1980, it has been run by the "Miss Turkey Organization".

Between the years 1980–1990, the contest was sponsored by the newspapers Güneş, Sabah, Tercüman, Bulvar, and some others.

=== Broadcasts ===
With the establishment of private TV channels in Turkey in 1990, the channels Magic Box, Show TV, Channel D, Star TV, NTV, CNBC-e and FOX TV took over the promotion of the pageant.

The title "Miss Turkey" is a registered trademark.

=== National franchise holders ===
The main winner of Miss Turkey competes in the Miss World pageant. The Miss Turkey Organization also crowns delegates to Miss Universe, Miss International, and Miss Supranational beauty pageants.

- Miss Turkey—World
- Miss Turkey—Universe
- Miss Turkey—Supranational

== International winners ==
Note: Not all winners are determined by the current Miss Turkey Organization.

- Miss World

- 2002: Azra Akın

- Miss Top Model of the World

- 2001: Yeliz Celiskan
- 2003: Nihan Akkuş

- Miss Intercontinental

- 1999: Mine Erbaykent

- Miss Asia Pacific

- 1979: Ayla Atlas
- 1984: Melek Gurkan
- 1998: Arzu Albayrak

- Miss Europe

- 1952: Günseli Başar
- 1971: Filiz Vural
- 1982: Nazlı Deniz Kuruoğlu
- 1984: Neşe Erberk
- 1993: Arzum Onan

- Miss Universe

- 1932: Keriman Halis Ece

=== Unsuccessful attempts to participate ===
(DNC) = Did not compete

(*) The Miss Universe delegate during the year 2000, Cansu Dere, was forbidden by the Turkish Government to travel to the 2000 Miss Universe pageant, in Cyprus, unless she could pass through Northern Cyprus, which was then forbidden for any visitor to the Republic of Cyprus. The competition committee in Turkey made arrangements for her to travel through Athens, but the day before her departure the government refused to let her go, "for political reasons". This was the second delegate that was not allowed to represent Turkey that year.

(*) Ahu Ağırbaş who was crowned Miss Turkey/International 2013 did not compete, due to maximum age recruitment.

(**) Competition was arranged after the deadline of the Miss Universe pageant, and the competition committee could not send a delegate. The delegate who was supposed to enter the Miss Universe pageant, competed the following year instead.

== Titleholders ==
=== 1929–1991 ===
Winner International Title
Miss Turkey Universe
Miss Turkey World
Miss Turkey International
Miss Turkey Europe

Year	Türkiye Güzellik Kraliçesi / Miss Turkey
1929	Feriha Tevfik
1930	Mübeccel Namık
1931	Naşide Saffet Esen
1932	Keriman Halis Ece; Miss Universe 1932
1933	Naziré Hanim
1936	Mahmure Birsen Sakaoğlu
1950	Güler Arıman
1951	Günseli Başar; Miss Europe 1952
1952	Gelengül Tayfuroğlu
1953	Ayten Akyol
1954	Sibel Göksel
1955	Suna Soley
1956	Can Uysaloğlu
1957	Güler Sirmen
1958	Ezel Olcay
1959	Figen Ozgurun
1960	Hilal Nebahat Çehre
1961	Gülseren Uysal
1962	Zeynep Ziyal
1963	Sevin Emre
1964	Ayten Örnek
1965	Zerrin Arbaş
1966	İnci Asena
1967	Yelda Gürani
1968	Zumal Aktan
1969	Şermin Ayşin
1970	Asuman Tuğberk Yolaç
1971	Filiz Vural
1972	Feyzal Kibarer
1973	Beyhan Kıral
1974	Simiten Gakirgoz
1975	Harika Değirmenci
1976	Jale Bayhan
1977	Kamer Bulutöte
1978	Sevil Özgültekin
1979	Şebnem Ünal
1980	Fahriye Funda Ayloğlu
1981	Aydan Şener
1982	Ayşe Belgin Güven
1983	Dilara Haraççı
1983	Hülya Avşar; Dethroned
1984	Gülçin Ülker
1985	Mülge Gördürür
1986	Meltem Doğanay
1987	Şebnem Dinçgör
1988	Meltem Hakarar
1989	Jasmin Baradan
1990	Jülide Ateş
1991	Pınar Özdemir

=== 1992–2016 ===
Miss Turkey
Year	Universe	Province	World	Province	International	Province	Europe	Province
1992	Elif Ilgaz	Istanbul	Özlem Kaymaz	Istanbul	Banu Nur Dipçin	Istanbul	Banu Sağnak	Istanbul
1993	İpek Gümüşoğlu	Istanbul	Emel Yıldırım	—	Hande Kazanova	Istanbul	Arzum Onan; Miss Europe 1993	Ankara
1994	Banu Usluer	Istanbul	Pınar Altuğ	Istanbul	Ayşin Albayrak	—	Didem Uzel	—
1995	Gamze Saygı	Istanbul	Demet Şener	Bursa	Ahu Paşakay	—	Beste Açar	—
1996	Serpil Sevilay Öztürk	Ankara	Serpil Sevilay Öztürk	Ankara	Gökçe Yanardağ	—	Pınar Yiğit	—
1997	Yeşim Çetin	Istanbul	Çağla Şıkel	Istanbul	Burcu Esmersoy	Istanbul	Nilay Ceylan	—
1998	Asuman Krause	Istanbul	Buket Saygı	Balıkesir	Senay Akay	—	Sinem Öztufan	—
1999	Öznur Dursun	Istanbul	Ayşe Hatun Önal	Adana	Merve Alman	—	Hülya Mutlu	—
2000	Cansu Dere	Ankara	Yüksel Ak	İzmir	Hülya Karanlık	—	Gamze Ozcelik	—
2001	Sedef Avcı	Adana	Tuğçe Kazaz	Balıkesir	Ece Incedursun	—	Hatice Şendil	Istanbul
2002	Çağla Kubat	İzmir	Azra Akın; Miss World 2002	Istanbul	Nihan Akkuş	—	Esra Eron	—
2003	Özge Ulusoy	Ankara	Kadriye Tuğba Karaca	Ankara	Gizem Kalyoncu	—	Yelda Kaya	—
2004	Fatoş Seğmen	İzmir	Nur Gümüsdograyan	Ordu	Gülşah Şahin	—	Birce Akalay	—
2005	Dilek Aksoy	İzmir	Hande Subaşı	Ankara	Şebnem Asade	—	Merve Özkaran	—
2006	Ceyla Kirazlı	İzmir	Merve Büyüksaraç	Ankara	Asena Tuğal	Istanbul	Selda Öğrük	—
2007	Sinem Sülün	Samsun	Mükerrem Selen Soyder	İzmir	Aslı Temel	—	Feyza Çipa	—
2008	Begüm Kızıltuğ	Istanbul	Leyla Lydia Tuğutlu	Istanbul	Gülsün Uslu	—	Gizem Yurtoğlu	—
2009	Senem Kuyucuoğlu	İzmir	Ebru Şam	Istanbul	Gülsün Uslu	—	Ebru Hacıbedel	—
Year	Universe	Province	World	Province	International	Province	Earth	Province
2010	Gizem Memiç	Ankara	Gizem Memiç	Ankara	Dilay Korkmaz	Ankara	Aylin Döndü Şahin	Istanbul
2010	Serenay Sarıkaya; Resigned	Ankara	Gizem Memiç	Ankara	Dilay Korkmaz	Ankara	Aylin Döndü Şahin	Istanbul
2011	Melisa Aslı Pamuk	Hatay	Gizem Karaca	Istanbul	Elif Korkmaz	İzmir	Merve Sarıbaş	Istanbul
2012	Çağıl Özge Özkul	Ankara	Açalya Samyeli Danoğlu	Tekirdağ	Meltem Tuzuner	Istanbul	İlknur Melis Durası	Istanbul
2013	Berrin Keklikler	Istanbul	Ruveyda Öksuz	Istanbul	Ahu Ağırbaş	Istanbul	Ezgi Avcı	Istanbul
2014	Dilan Çiçek Deniz	Sivas	Amine Gülşe	Istanbul	Hilal Yabuz	Bursa	Aybüke Pusat	Istanbul
Year	Universe	Province	World	Province	International	Province	Supranational	Province
2015	Aslı Melisa Uzun	Ankara	Ecem Çırpan	Bursa	Berfu Yıldız	Kocaeli	Hazal Subaşı	İzmir
2016	Tansu Sıla Çakır	Istanbul	Buse İskenderoğlu	Ankara	Damla Figan	Erzincan	Çagla Çukurova	Istanbul

=== 2017–2022 ===
Miss Turkey
Year	Universe	Province	World	Province	Supranational	Province
2017	Pınar Tartan	İzmir	Aslı Sümen	Mersin	Yasemin Çoklar	Istanbul
2017	Pınar Tartan	İzmir	Itır Esen; Dethroned	Istanbul	Yasemin Çoklar	Istanbul
2018	Tara Madelein de Vries	Istanbul	Şevval Şahin	Istanbul	Roda Irmak Kalkan	Istanbul
2019	Bilgi Aydoğmuş	Istanbul	Simay Rasimoğlu	Istanbul	Büşra Turan	Istanbul
2021	Cemrenaz Turhan	Istanbul	Dilara Korkmaz	Ankara	Şira Sahilli	Istanbul
2022	Aleyna Şirin	Istanbul	Nursana Say	Istanbul	Selin Erberk Gurdikyan	Istanbul

== Representatives to international beauty pageants ==
Miss Turkey sends representatives to the Big Four, the world's four most important beauty contest. Traditionally, the major titleholders of Miss Turkey represent the country at the Miss Universe, Miss World and Miss Supranational and other titles might go to Miss International and Miss Earth pageants.

=== Miss Turkey Universe ===
- : Declared as Winner
- : Ended as runner-up or top 5/6 qualification
- : Ended as one of the finalists or semifinalists
- : Ended as special awards winner

On some occasions, the winner of Miss Turkey Universe represents her country at the Miss Universe. Began 2024 the Miss Universe Turkiye was selected by Miss Universe Turkiye Organization.

Year	Province	Miss Turkey Universe	Placement at Miss Universe	Special Awards	Notes
2023	Did not compete				
2022	Istanbul	Aleyna Şirin	Unplaced		
2021	Istanbul	Cemrenaz Turhan	Unplaced		
2020	Due to the impact of COVID-19 pandemic, no representative in 2020				
2019	Istanbul	Bilgi Aydoğmuş	Unplaced		
2018	Istanbul	Tara Madelein de Vries	Unplaced		
2017	İzmir	Pınar Tartan	Unplaced		During Miss Turkey grand finale, Pinar won Miss Turkey Supranational 2017 but some hours later she announced as the winner of Miss Turkey Universe 2017.
2016	Istanbul	Tansu Sıla Çakır	Unplaced		
2015	Ankara	Aslı Melisa Uzun	Unplaced		
2014	Sivas	Dilan Çiçek Deniz	Unplaced		
2013	Istanbul	Berrin Keklikler	Unplaced		
2012	Ankara	Çağıl Özge Özkul	Top 16		
2011	Hatay	Melisa Aslı Pamuk	Unplaced		
2010	Ankara	Gizem Memiç	Unplaced		
2009	İzmir	Senem Kuyucuoğlu	Unplaced		
2008	Samsun	Sinem Sülün	Unplaced		Took over Begüm's position — Sinem was Miss Turkey Universe 2007 who canceled her participant at Miss Universe 2007 in Mexico.
2008	Istanbul	Begüm Kızıltuğ	Did not compete		Withdrew, for personal reasons before coming to Miss Universe 2008 in Vietnam — Last winner of 2007, Sinem Sülün who did not compete at Miss Universe 2007 replaced to be sent to upcoming season in Vietnam.
2007	Samsun	Sinem Sülün	Did not compete		Allocated to Miss Universe 2008.
2006	İzmir	Ceyla Kirazlı	Unplaced		
2005	İzmir	Dilek Aksoy	Unplaced		
2004	İzmir	Fatoş Seğmen	Unplaced		
2003	Ankara	Özge Ulusoy	Unplaced		
2002	İzmir	Çağla Kubat	Unplaced		
2001	Adana	Sedef Avcı	Unplaced		
2000	Ankara	Cansu Dere	Did not compete		Withdrew, due to political issues between Turkey and Cyprus (Host of Miss Universe 2000); Turkey had no relations with the Republic of Cyprus.
1999	Istanbul	Öznur Dursun	Unplaced		
1998	Istanbul	Asuman Krause	Unplaced	Miss Congeniality	
1997	Istanbul	Yeşim Çetin	Unplaced		
1996	Ankara	Serpil Sevilay Öztürk	Unplaced		
1995	Istanbul	Gamze Saygı	Unplaced		
1994	Istanbul	Banu Usluer	Unplaced		
1993	Istanbul	İpek Gümüşoğlu	Unplaced	Best National Costume (2nd Runner-up)	
1992	Istanbul	Elif Ilgaz	Unplaced		
1991	Ankara	Pınar Özdemir	Unplaced		
1990	Elazığ	Jülide Ateş	Top 10		
1989	Istanbul	Jasmin Baradan	Unplaced		
1988	Istanbul	Meltem Hakarar	Unplaced		
1987	İzmir	Leyla Şeşbeş	Unplaced		
1986	Istanbul	Demet Başdemir	Unplaced		Designation — A Runner-up took over to compete at Miss Universe 1986.
1986	Ankara	Meltem Doğanay	Did not compete		Allocated to Miss World 1986.
1985	Did not compete				
1984	Istanbul	Gülçin Ülker	Unplaced		
1983	Istanbul	Dilara Haraççı	Unplaced		
1983	Balıkesir	Hülya Avşar	Did not compete		Dethroned.
1982	Istanbul	Canan Emine Kakmacı	Unplaced		
1981	Ankara	Şenay Ünlü	Unplaced		
1980	Istanbul	Heyecan Gökoğlu	Unplaced		Can Sandıkçıoğlu directorship.
1979	Ankara	Füsan Tahire Dermitaş	Unplaced		
1978	Istanbul	Billur Lütfiye Bingöl	Unplaced		
1977	Did not compete				
1976	Istanbul	Manolya Onur	Unplaced		
1975	Istanbul	Sezin Topçuoğlu	Unplaced		
1974	Istanbul	Simiten Gakirgoz	Unplaced		
1973	Istanbul	Yıldız Arhan	Unplaced		
1972	Eskişehir	Neslihan Sunay	Unplaced		
1971	Istanbul	Filiz Vural	Unplaced		
1970	Istanbul	Asuman Tuğberk	Unplaced		
1969	Istanbul	Azra Balkan	Unplaced		
1968	Istanbul	Zumal Aktan	Unplaced		
1967	Istanbul	Yelda Gürani	Unplaced		
1966	Istanbul	Nilgün Arslaner	Unplaced		
1965	Samsun	Hilal Nebahat Çehre	Unplaced		
1964	Istanbul	İnci Duran	Unplaced		
1963	Istanbul	Güler Samuray	Unplaced		
1962	Istanbul	Behad Gülay Sezer	Unplaced		
1961	Istanbul	Gülseren Uysal	Unplaced		
1960	Istanbul	Figen Ozgurun	Did not compete		
1959	Istanbul	Ezel Olcay	Unplaced		
1958	Did not compete				
1957	Istanbul	Güler Sirmen	Unplaced		
1956	Istanbul	Can Uysaloğlu	Unplaced		
1955	Istanbul	Suna Soley	Did not compete		
1954	Istanbul	Sibel Göksel	Did not compete		
1953	Istanbul	Ayten Akyol	Top 16		
1952	Ankara	Gelengül Tayfuroğlu	Unplaced		Özcan Sandıkçıoğlu directorship.

=== Miss Turkey World ===
- : Declared as Winner
- : Ended as runner-up or top 5/6 qualification
- : Ended as one of the finalists or semifinalists
- : Ended as special awards winner

On some occasions, the winner of Miss Turkey World represents her country at the Miss World.

Year	Province	Miss Turkey World	Placement at Miss World	Special Awards	Notes
2027	TBA	TBA	TBA		
2026	Istanbul	Sila Saraydemir	Top 40		
2025	Ankara	İdil Bilgen	Top 40	Head to Head Challenge; Miss World Sport (Top 32)	
2024	Miss World 2023 was rescheduled to 9 March 2024 due to the elections in India; no edition started in 2024				
2023	Istanbul	Nursena Say	Top 40		
2022	Miss World 2021 was rescheduled to 16 March 2022 due to the COVID-19 pandemic outbreak in Puerto Rico, no edition started in 2022				
2021	Ankara	Dilara Korkmaz	Unplaced		
2020	Due to the impact of COVID-19 pandemic, no competition held				
2019	Istanbul	Simay Rasimoğlu	Unplaced	Miss World Top Model (Top 40)	
2018	Istanbul	Şevval Şahin	Unplaced		
2017	Mersin	Aslı Sümen	Unplaced		
2016	Ankara	Buse İskenderoğlu	Unplaced		
2015	Bursa	Ecem Çırpan	Unplaced		
2014	Istanbul	Amine Gülşe	Unplaced		
2013	Istanbul	Ruveyda Öksuz	Unplaced		
2012	Tekirdağ	Açalya Samyeli Danoğlu	Unplaced		
2011	Istanbul	Gizem Karaca	Unplaced		
2010	Ankara	Gizem Memiç	Unplaced		
2009	Istanbul	Ebru Şam	Unplaced		
2008	Istanbul	Leyla Lydia Tuğutlu	Unplaced		
2007	İzmir	Mükerrem Selen Soyder	Unplaced		
2006	Ankara	Merve Büyüksaraç	Unplaced		
2005	Ankara	Hande Subaşı	Unplaced	World Designer Dress award	
2004	Ordu	Nur Gümüsdograyan	Unplaced		
2003	Ankara	Kadriye Tuğba Karaca	Unplaced		
2002	Istanbul	Azra Akın	Miss World 2002	Miss World Europe; World Designer Dress award	
2001	Balıkesir	Tuğçe Kazaz	Unplaced		
2000	İzmir	Yüksel Ak	2nd Runner-up		
1999	Adana	Ayşe Hatun Önal	Unplaced		
1998	Balıkesir	Buket Saygı	Unplaced		
1997	Istanbul	Çağla Şıkel	Top 5	Miss World Europe	
1996	Ankara	Serpil Sevilay Öztürk	Unplaced		
1995	Bursa	Demet Şener	Unplaced		
1994	Istanbul	Pınar Altuğ	Unplaced		
1993	Istanbul	Emel Yıldırım	Unplaced		
1992	Istanbul	Özlem Kaymaz	Unplaced		
1991	Ankara	Aslıhan Koruyan	Top 10	Miss World Europe	
1990	Elazığ	Jülide Ateş	Top 10		
1989	Istanbul	Burcu Burkut	Unplaced		
1988	Istanbul	Esra Sümer	Unplaced		
1987	Istanbul	Şebnem Dinçgör	Unplaced		
1986	Ankara	Meltem Doğanay	Unplaced		
Did not compete between 1984—1985
1983	Istanbul	Ebru Özmeriç Yaşinel	Unplaced		
1982	Istanbul	Belgin Güven	Unplaced		
1981	Kilis	Aydan Şener	Unplaced		
1980	Istanbul	Fahriye Funda Ayloğlu	Unplaced		Can Sandıkçıoğlu directorship.
1979	Istanbul	Şebnem Ünal	Unplaced		
1978	Istanbul	Sevil Özgültekin	Unplaced		
1977	Istanbul	Kamer Bulutöte	Unplaced		
1976	Ankara	Jale Bayhan	Top 7		
1975	Istanbul	Harika Değirmenci	Unplaced		
1974	Did not compete				
1973	Istanbul	Beyhan Kıral	Unplaced		
1972	Istanbul	Feyzal Kibarer	Unplaced		
1971	Istanbul	Nil Menemencioğlu	Unplaced		
1970	Istanbul	Afet Tuğbay	Unplaced		
1969	Istanbul	Şermin Ayşin	Unplaced		
1968	Istanbul	Mine Kürkçüoğlu	Unplaced		
1967	Istanbul	Neşe Yazıcıgil	Unplaced		
1966	Istanbul	İnci Asena	Unplaced		Asena participated at Miss Turkey using the name of her late aunt, Aylin Öndersev.
1965	Did not compete				
1964	Istanbul	Nurlan Coşkun	Unplaced		
1963	İzmir	Gülseren Kocaman	Unplaced		
1962	Did not compete				
1961	Istanbul	Güler Samuray	Top 15		
1960	Samsun	Hilal Nebahat Çehre	Unplaced		
1959	Did not compete				
1958	Istanbul	Sunay Uslu	Unplaced		
Did not compete between 1955—1957
1954	Istanbul	Suna Özekin	Unplaced		Özcan Sandıkçıoğlu directorship.

=== Miss Turkey International ===
- : Declared as Winner
- : Ended as runner-up or top 5/6 qualification
- : Ended as one of the finalists or semifinalists
- : Ended as special awards winner

Year	Province	Miss Turkey International	Placement at Miss International	Special Awards	Notes
2026	TBA	TBA	TBA		
2025	Ankara	Ayşe Sena Şeref	Unplaced		She made it to the top 12 of Miss Turkey 2024, and was appointed as the representative by Adnan Seker, President of Miss Aura International.

=== Miss Turkey Supranational ===
- : Declared as Winner
- : Ended as runner-up or top 5/6 qualification
- : Ended as one of the finalists or semifinalists
- : Ended as special awards winner

On some occasions, the winner of Miss Turkey Supranational represents her country at the Miss Supranational.

Year	Province	Miss Turkey Supranational	Placement at Miss Supranational	Special Awards	Notes
2025	Istanbul	Cemre Üker	Did not compete		
2024	Did not compete				
2023	Istanbul	Selin Erberk Gürdikyan	Unplaced		
2022	Istanbul	Şira Sahilli	Unplaced	Miss Elegance	
Did not compete between 2020―2021
2019	Istanbul	Büşra Turan	Unplaced		
2018	Istanbul	Roda Irmak Kalkan	Unplaced		
2017	Istanbul	Yasemin Çoklar	Unplaced		
2016	Erzincan	Damla Figan	Unplaced		
2015	İzmir	Hazal Subaşı	Unplaced		
2014	Ankara	Hilal Soyler	Unplaced		
2013	Istanbul	Leyla Köse	2nd Runner-up		
2012	Istanbul	Ozlem Katipoglu	Unplaced		
2011	Ankara	Hilal Uzun	Unplaced		
2010	Ankara	Nazidda Yildiz	Unplaced		Can Sandıkçıoğlu directorship.

== See also ==
- Mister Turkey
