= List of programmes broadcast by MBC 4 =

This is a list of programmes broadcast by MBC 4.

== Programming ==
Dubbing and subtitling of all series is in Arabic.

=== Shows ===
- 4N1K
- The 45 Rules of Divorce
- A-List Lifestyle
- Al-Hayat Turkey
- Action Zone
- Al Anisa Farah
- Ba’at Al Ward
- Big Apple Music Awards
- Beauty Match
- Beauty Match: Tahadi Al Fashionista
- Box Office Top 5
- Celebrity Scoop
- Celebrity Style Story
- Chancers
- Comedy Movies
- Designers, Fashions and Runways
- Extra Turkey
- Famous Foodies
- Fashion
- Fashion Forward
- Fatma
- Films & Stars
- Free Mashup
- Hala
- Hollywood Buzz
- Hollywood Me!
- Hollywood Stars
- How to Live Longer
- The Intimate Story of Isabel Allende
- Khareef al Hob
- Kitchen Millionaire
- Love Songs
- MBC Beauty Match
- Making the Movies
- Miss Farah
- Must Haves
- The Mix
- Nesa'a Ha'erat
- Newton's Cradle
- Oghneyat Hob
- Planet Action
- Reel Talk
- Scoop
- Scoop Box Office
- Scoop Network
- Scoop On Runway
- Scoop On Set
- Scoop with Raya
- StarTalk
- Special Hour
- Travel In Style
- US Box Office

=== News and current affairs ===
- 20/20
- 48 Hours
- 60 Minutes
- ABC World News
- ABC World News Tonight
- America This Morning
- CBS Evening News
- CBS Market Watch
- CBS Overnight News
- The Early Show
- Face the Nation
- Good Morning America
- Nightline
- Primetime
- World News Now

=== Entertainment ===
- A-List Lifestyle
- Action Zone
- Box Office America
- Box Office Top 5
- Celebrity Scoop
- Celebrity Style Story
- Entertainment Tonight
- Extra تركي
- Extra Turkey
- Extra Turkish
- Extra Turki
- Famous Foodies
- Fashion
- Fashion Forward
- Films & Stars
- Inside Edition
- Inside Edition Week
- News Magazine
- Ness Hollywood
- Hala
- Hollywood Buzz
- Hollywood Me!
- Hollywood stars
- Hollywood Stars
- The Insider
- Making the Movies
- Planet Action
- Reel Talk
- Scoop
- Scoop Box Office
- Scoop Network
- Scoop On Runway
- Scoop On Set
- Scoop with Raya
- StarTalk
- Young Hollywood's Greatest...
- Young Hollywood Presents Evolution of…

=== Home shopping ===
- Home Shopping Network (HSN)
- QVC Network
- TVSN
- Home Shopping Network (HSN) USA
- QVC Network UK
- TVSN Australia

=== Soap operas ===
- The Bold and the Beautiful
- Days of Our Lives
- October Road
- October Road (TV series)

=== Talk shows ===
- Conan
- The Doctors
- The Dr. Oz Show
- Dr. Phil
- Late Show with David Letterman
- The Oprah Winfrey Show
- Rachael Ray
- Saturday Night Live
- The Talk

=== Comedy & sitcoms ===
- 2 Broke Girls
- 30 Rock
- 3rd Rock From the Sun
- 8 Simple Rules
- All That
- All of Us
- According To Jim
- Becker
- The Bernie Mac Show
- Big Time Rush
- Better Off Ted
- The Big Bang Theory
- Breaking In
- Bella and the Bulldogs
- Brothers
- Bucket & Skinner's Epic Adventures
- Bad Teacher
- Clueless
- Community
- Courting Alex
- Cory in the House
- Cuts
- Dharma & Greg
- Don't Trust the B— in Apartment 23
- Drake & Josh
- Everybody Hates Chris
- Everybody Loves Raymond
- Even Stevens
- Fred: The Show
- Frasier
- Friends
- Friends with Benefits
- Full House
- The Goldbergs
- Goldie's Oldies
- Go On
- Ground Floor
- Good Luck Charlie
- Game Shakers
- The Golden Girls
- Home Improvement
- Hope & Faith
- How I Met Your Mother
- The Haunted Hathaways
- Hannah Montana
- I'm in the Band
- iCarly
- Instant Mom
- It's Always Sunny in Philadelphia
- Jake in Progress
- Just Jordan
- Joey
- Jonas
- The King of Queens
- Kitchen Confidential
- Kenan & Kel
- Last Man Standing
- Level Up
- The Late Show with David Letterman
- The League
- Life with Derek
- The Latest Buzz
- Less than Perfect
- Living with Fran
- Mad About You
- Mad Love
- Malcolm in the Middle
- Married to the Kellys
- Men at Work
- The Michael J. Fox Show
- The Middle
- Mike & Molly
- The Millers
- The Mindy Project
- My Name Is Earl
- My Wife & Kids
- New Girl
- Ned's Declassified School Survival Guide
- Naturally, Sadie
- Nicky, Ricky, Dicky & Dawn
- Out of Practice
- Odd Mom Out
- The Office
- One on One
- Outsourced
- Phil of the Future
- Parks and Recreation
- Quintuplets
- Raising Hope
- Rules of Engagement
- Sabrina, the Teenage Witch
- Scrubs
- Sam & Cat
- Side Hustle
- See Dad Run
- Seinfeld
- The Simpsons
- Silicon Valley
- Still Standing
- Sonny with a Chance
- Super Fun Night
- That '70s Show
- The Suite Life on Deck
- The Suite Life of Zack & Cody
- That’s So Raven
- The Thundermans
- Traffic Light
- Two and a Half Men
- Two Guys and a Girl
- True Jackson, VP
- Up All Night
- Unfabulous
- Veep
- Victorious
- Wedding Band
- Wendell & Vinnie
- Wizards of Waverly Place
- Whitney
- Your Family or Mine
- Zeke and Luther
- Zoey 101

=== Drama ===
- The 45 Rules of Divorce
- 90210
- Amas de Casa Desesperadas
- Alias
- Alia
- Ally McBeal
- Angel
- The Affair
- Army Wives
- Arrow
- Awake
- Aaron Stone
- Beauty & the Beast
- Beauty and the Beast
- The Best Years
- Big Love
- Big Little Lies
- Bones
- Boston Public
- Brooklyn Nine-Nine
- The Bureau of Magical Things
- Buffy the Vampire Slayer
- Canterbury's Law
- The Carrie Diaries
- Crazy Ex-Girlfriend
- Charlie's Angels
- Charmed
- Commander in Chief
- Crossing Jordan
- Dallas
- Damages
- Dawson's Creek
- The Dead Zone
- The Defenders
- Darcy's Wild Life
- Desperate Housewives
- The District
- Drop Dead Diva
- Don't Say Goodbye (Turkish Series)
- Eastwick
- Ed
- Elementary
- Emily Owens, M.D.
- Empire
- Everwood
- ER
- Eye Candy
- The Enemy Within
- Flight 29 Down
- Falcon Beach
- Fantasy Island
- Franklin & Bash
- Fantasy Island
- The Finder
- The Game
- Girlfriends' Guide to Divorce
- Girlfriends' Guide to Divorce (AR)
- Game of Thrones
- Ghost Whisperer
- Gilmore Girls
- Glee
- The Good Wife
- The Good Wife
- Gossip Girl
- Gossip Girl
- Grey's Anatomy
- Grey's Anatomy (season 3)
- Grimm
- The Guardian
- Gigantic
- Holly's Heroes
- Hollywood Heights
- Hart of Dixie
- Hawthorne
- Hellcats
- Hunter Street
- House
- House, M.D.
- House of Cards
- House of Anubis
- In Plain Sight
- Jake 2.0
- Justified
- Kevin Hill
- Killer Instinct
- Life
- Las Vegas
- Law & Order
- Law & Order: Criminal Intent
- Law & Order: LA
- Law & Order: Special Victims Unit
- Law & Order: Trial by Jury
- Law & Order True Crime
- The Leftovers
- Life Unexpected
- Life with Bonnie
- Lincoln Heights
- Lois & Clark: The New Adventures of Superman
- The Lying Game
- Life Goes On (Turkish Series)
- The Lost Dream
- The Lost Dream (Turkish Series)
- Lizzie McGuire
- Lassie
- Jane the Virgin
- Jane the Virgin (AR)
- Mad Men
- Majority Rules!
- Medical Investigation
- Medium
- Melrose Place
- Men in Trees
- Mercy
- Miami Medical
- Miami Trauma
- Miss Match
- Miss Farah
- Magnum
- Magnum, P.I.
- M.I. High
- Missing
- Monk
- Moonlighting
- NCIS
- Necessary Roughness
- The Newsroom
- The Night Shift
- North Shore
- Nurse Jackie
- Newton's Cradle
- Numbers
- The O.C.
- Once And Again
- Outlander
- October Road
- October Road (TV series)
- Pan Am
- Parenthood
- Pepper Dennis
- The Philanthropist
- Popular
- Presidio Med
- Pretty Little Liars
- Private Practice
- Privileged
- Power Rangers
- Psych
- Rush
- Reign
- Ravenswood
- Rescue Me
- Ringer
- Rizzoli and Isles
- Royal Pains
- The Sarah Jane Adventures
- The Secret Circle
- Sex and the City
- Star Falls
- Six Degrees
- Smash
- Stalker
- Star-Crossed
- Strong Medicine
- The Sparticle Mystery
- Sue Thomas: F.B.Eye
- Suits
- Summerland
- Time After Time
- True Detective
- Three Wishes
- The Troop
- Tower Prep
- Unforgettable
- Ugly Betty
- The Vampire Diaries
- What About Brian?
- The Whole Truth
- Wilfred
- When Saying Goodbye
- The Wall: Cover Your Tracks
- The Wall 2: The Chateau Murder
- Why Women Kill
- Women's Murder Club
- The X-Files

=== Game shows ===
- The Chase USA
- Jeopardy!
- The Moment of Truth
- Wheel of Fortune

=== From the BBC ===
- 5 Days
- Arabian Nights
- 'Allo 'Allo!
- Absolutely Fabulous
- Anthea Turner: Perfect Housewife
- As Time Goes By
- Atlantis
- Ballykissangel
- Blackadder
- Brilliant Creatures
- Deadly 60
- Celebrity MasterChef
- Five Days
- Gavin & Stacey
- Junior MasterChef
- Keeping Up Appearances
- Killing Eve
- The Little Paris Kitchen: Cooking with Rachel Khoo
- M.I. High
- Mary Queen of Shops
- MasterChef
- MasterChef: The Professionals
- Men Behaving Badly (series 3–6)
- Merlin
- The New Statesman
- The Night Manager
- Not the Nine O'Clock News
- The Office
- The Really Wild Show
- Robot Wars (series 8–10)
- The Sarah Jane Adventures
- Sparticle Mystery
- Spooks
- The Thin Blue Line
- To the Manor Born
- The Tudors
- What Not to Wear
- You Rang, M'Lord?

=== From ITV ===
- Agatha Christie's Marple
- Agatha Christie's Poirot
- The Benny Hill Show
- The Bill
- Britain's Got Talent
- Britain's Got Talent S12
- Britain's Got Talent (season 12)
- The Chase UK
- Downton Abbey
- Foyle's War
- Heartbeat
- Hell's Kitchen
- I'm a Celebrity...Get Me Out of Here!
- Law & Order: UK
- Midsomer Murders
- Mind Your Language
- Mr. Bean
- Mr. Selfridge
- Peak Practice
- Quiz
- Tricky TV
- Wheel of Fortune UK
- The X Factor UK
- The X Factor: Battle of the Stars
- The X Factor: Celebrity
- The X Factor: The Band

=== From Channel 4 ===
- Brat Camp UK
- Celebrity Wedding Planner
- Gok's Style Secrets
- Ramsay's Kitchen Nightmares
- Supernanny
- Wife Swap

=== From UKTV ===
- The Clothes Show

=== From RTÉ Ireland ===
- MasterChef Ireland

=== From Network Ten Australia ===
- Australian Princess
- Celebrity MasterChef Australia
- Junior MasterChef Australia
- MasterChef Australia
- MasterChef Australia: The Professionals
- Rush
- The X Factor Australia

=== From Seven Network Australia ===
- Winners & Losers
- The Chase Australia
- The X Factor Australia

=== From Television New Zealand ===
- MasterChef New Zealand

=== From M-Net ===
- MasterChef South Africa

=== From Ebony Life TV ===
- Desperate Housewives Africa

=== From Disney ===
- A.N.T. Farm
- Austin & Ally
- Alex & Co.
- Binny and the Ghost
- Bunk'd
- Best Friends Whenever
- Bizaardvark
- Dog with a Blog
- Cookabout
- Coop & Cami Ask the World
- Cory in the House
- Disney Fam Jam
- Even Stevens
- Gabby Duran & the Unsittables
- Girl Meets World
- Good Luck Charlie
- Hannah Montana
- I Didn't Do It
- Jessie
- Jonas
- Just Roll with It
- K.C. Undercover
- Lab Rats
- Liv and Maddie
- Lizzie McGuire
- Phil of the Future
- Raven's Home
- Soy Luna
- Secrets of Sulphur Springs
- Shake It Up
- Sydney to the Max
- Sonny with a Chance
- So Random!
- The Evermoor Chronicles
- The Suite Life of Zack & Cody
- The Suite Life on Deck
- That's So Raven
- Violetta
- Walk the Prank
- Wizards of Waverly Place

=== From Cartoon Network series ===
- Tower Prep
- Level Up

=== From Nickelodeon ===
- Goldie's Oldies
- All That
- The Bureau of Magical Things
- The Haunted Hathaways
- Max & Shred
- Drake & Josh
- iCarly
- Just Jordan
- Victorious
- The Troop
- Unfabulous
- The Thundermans
- Nickelodeon Kids' Choice Awards Abu Dhabi
- Side Hustle

- Sam & Cat
- True Jackson, VP
- Ned's Declassified School Survival Guide
- Zoey 101
- Kenan & Kel
- Big Time Rush
- Fred: The Show
- Nicky, Ricky, Dicky & Dawn
- The Haunted Hathaways
- Bella and the Bulldogs
- Game Shakers
- Kids Choice Awards

- Hollywood Heights
- Wendell & Vinnie
- See Dad Run
- Instant Mom
- Gigantic
- Bucket & Skinner's Epic Adventures
- House of Anubis
- Star Falls
- Hunter Street
- Nickelodeon Kids' Choice Awards

=== Reality ===
- America's Got Talent
- America's Supernanny
- American Idol
- American Inventor
- The Apprentice
- The Bachelor
- The Biggest Loser
- Brat Camp USA
- Bridezillas
- The Celebrity Apprentice
- Celebrity Rehab with Dr. Drew
- The Cut
- Canada's Got Talent
- DC Cupcakes
- Face Off
- The Fashion Fund
- Gallery Girls
- Haunted Hotels
- Hell's Kitchen USA
- House Swap
- I Can See Your Voice
- Keeping Up With the Kardashians
- Lip Sync Battle
- Lip Sync Battle Shorties
- Living Lahaina
- Making the Band
- The Masked Singer
- The Masked Dancer
- MasterChef Canada
- MasterChef USA
- Miss Seventeen
- Models of the Runway
- The Next: Fame Is at Your Doorstep
- Pimp My Ride
- Planet Cake
- Project Accessory
- Project Runway
- Race to the Altar
- The Real Housewives of Atlanta
- The Real Housewives of Beverly Hills
- The Real Housewives of D.C.
- The Real Housewives of Melbourne
- The Real Housewives of New Jersey
- The Real Housewives of New York City
- The Real Housewives of Orange County
- Say Yes to the Dress
- Say Yes to the Dress: UK
- Say Yes to the Dress: Atlanta
- Shaq's Big Challenge
- She's Got the Look
- Shedding for the Wedding
- Supernanny
- Supernanny USA
- So You Think You Can Dance
- Style Me with Rachel Hunter
- Tim Gunn's Guide to Style
- Three Wishes
- Top Chef
- Tori & Dean: Home Sweet Hollywood
- The X Factor USA
- What Not to Wear USA
- Who Do You Think You Are?
- Wife Swap USA
- XOX Betsey Johnson

=== Clip shows ===
- America's Funniest Home Videos

=== Miniseries ===
- Arabian Nights
- Political Animals
- Lost in the West
- Mildred Pierce

=== Spanish series ===
- Desaparecidos
- El embarcadero
- El ministerio del tiempo
- Hermanos
- La caza
- Madres. Amor y vida
- Presunto culpable
- Pulsaciones
- Secretos de Estado
- Sé quién eres
- Stolen Away
- Traición
- Unauthorized Living
- Velvet

=== Spanish-language series ===
- La bella y las bestias
- La Piloto

=== Japanese series ===
- Masked Rider Ex Aid
- Ultraman Ginga

=== Italian series ===
- Back to the Island
- My Brilliant Friend

=== Argentine series ===
- Lalola

=== German series ===
- Meine Mutter …

=== Slovenian series ===
- Divoké kone

=== Telenovelas ===
- احببت اعمى
- الملائكة الصغار
- Amor Maior
- Cordel Encantado
- India: A Love Story
- Desire
- Direito de Amar
- El Cuerpo del Deseo
- En tierras salvajes
- Kud puklo da puklo
- Fashion House
- Larin izbor
- La reina soy yo
- Monarch Cove
- Nazaré
- Paixão
- Pasión
- Rainha das Flores
- Rubí
- Terra Brava
- Vatre ivanjske
- Zora dubrovačka

=== Indian series ===
- India: A Love Story
- Chittod Ki Rani Padmini Ka Johur
- Caminho das Índias
- Ek Hasina Thi
- Saraswatichandra
- Jeevan Saathi
- Kitani Mohabbat Hai
- Kitani Mohabbat Hai 2
- Mahi Way
- Rishta.com

=== Young people's shows ===
- Bindi the Jungle Girl
- The Blobheads
- Gaming Show (In My Parents' Garage)
- Pirate Islands
- Scout's Safari
- Black Hole High
- Wicked Science
- Strange Days at Blake Holsey High
- Scooter: Secret Agent
- Max & Shred

=== Turkish drama ===
- 20 Dakika
- 4N1K
- 4N1K İlk Aşk
- Arıza
- Aliye
- Al ghareeb
- alzahra albayd
- Al-Ghareeb
- Alia
- Aziz
- Aşk Mantık İntikam
- Ayrılık
- Ada Masalı
- Annem
- Asi
- A.Ş.K.
- Aşk ve Ceza
- Aşk-ı Memnu
- Asmalı Konak
- Baeeat Al-Ward
- Berivan
- Benim Hala Umudum Var
- Benim Tatlı Yalanım
- Beyaz Gelincik
- Bıçak Sırtı
- Bay Yanlış
- Baht Oyunu
- Bir İstanbul Masalı
- Binbir Gece
- Bitmeyen Şarkı
- Brave and Beautiful
- Çarpışma
- Çukur
- Çilek Kokusu
- Cam Tavanlar
- Çemberimde Gül Oya
- Dinle Sevgili
- Don't Say Goodbye (Turkish Series)
- Elveda Derken
- Evlilik Hakkında Her Şey
- Elveda Rumeli
- Eve Düşen Yıldırım
- Ezel
- Fame
- Fame
- Fatima
- Forbiden Love
- Fatmagül'ün Suçu Ne?
- Fatma
- Haziran Gecesi
- Huzur Sokağı
- Gameat al Moshghbeen
- Genco
- Gönülçelen
- Gümüş
- Güneşi Beklerken
- Güneşin Kızları
- İlişki Durumu: Karışık
- Ihlamurlar Altında
- İçerde
- Kaderimin Yazıldığı Gün
- Kampüsistan
- Khareef al Hob
- Kuzey Güney
- Kara Para Aşk
- Kalpsiz Adam
- Kaybollan Yıllar
- Kiralık Aşk
- Karayılan
- Kiraz Mevsimi
- Kınalı Kar
- Kırık Kanatlar
- Kavak Yelleri
- Kızım Nerede?
- Küçük Gelin
- Kurt Seyit ve Şura
- Lale Devri
- The Lost Dream (Turkish Series)
- La makan la watan
- la makan la watan
- Life Goes On (Turkish Series)
- The Lost Dream
- Love Songs
- Hatırla Sevgili
- Muhtesem Yuzyil
- Medcezir
- Mirna Wa Khalil
- Madd Wa Jazr
- Menajerimi Ara
- Mirna and Khalil
- Mrs. Fazilet and Her Daughters
- Merhamet
- Mazi Kalbimde Yaradır
- "Mahkum - Şehrin Kralları"
- Nesa'a Ha'erat
- Nesa'a Haerat
- Nada El Omr
- Nada El Omr
- Jerh Al Mady
- Oghneyat Hob
- Öyle Bir Geçer Zaman Ki
- Öğretmen
- Paramparça
- Samanyolu
- Serçe
- Son
- sanawat el daya3
- Sanawāt adh-Dhayā‘
- Sanawat el daya'a
- Sefirin Kızı
- Sen Çal Kapımı
- Son Bahar
- Stiletto Vendetta
- Şöhret
- Tek Türkiye
- Tozluyaka
- Tatar Ramazan

Thaman al shohra

- The Lost Dream
- Vazgeç Gönlüm
- Umutsuz Ev Kadınları
- Utak Tefek Cinayetler
- Qesat Shetta
- Yabancı Damat
- Yamak Ahmet
- Yersiz Yurtsuz
- Yaprak Dökümü
- Yeşeren Düşler
- Yer Gök Aşk
- Zoraki Koca
- Zemheri

=== Korean drama ===
- The 1st Shop of Coffee Prince
- About Time
- Are You Human?
- At Eighteen
- Beautiful World
- The Beauty Inside
- Big
- Boys Over Flowers
- Cheat on Me If You Can
- Cinderella Man
- Clean with Passion for Now
- Discovery of Love
- Dream High
- Dream High 2
- Extraordinary You
- Fashion King
- Find Me in Your Memory
- Gangnam Beauty
- He Is Psychometric
- Heartstrings
- The Heirs
- Her Private Life
- Hotel del Luna
- Lawless Lawyer
- Love in Sadness
- My Secret Terrius
- Mary Stayed Out All Night
- Master's Sun
- Matrimonial Chaos
- Men Are Men
- Moment of Eighteen
- More Than Friends
- My Fair Lady
- My Princess
- Personal Taste
- Playful Kiss
- The Producers
- Reply 1988
- Reply 1994
- Reply 1997
- The Red Sleeve
- Rooftop Prince
- Search: WWW
- Secret Love Affair
- Suspicious Partner
- That Winter, the Wind Blows
- Touch Your Heart
- True Beauty
- Uncontrollably Fond
- Welcome
- What's Wrong with Secretary Kim
- When My Love Blooms
- Whisper
- When I Was the Most Beautiful
- You're Beautiful
- Oh My Venus

=== Pakistani drama ===
- Dil e Muztar
- Humsafar
- Maat
- Malaal
- Mata-e-Jaan Hai Tu
- Mera Naseeb
- Meray Qatil Meray Dildar
- Zindagi Gulzar Hai
- Qurban
- Baydardi
- Kaisa Hai Naseeban
- Ishq Tamasha

=== Brazilian drama ===
- Amor de Mãe
- Além do Tempo
- Amores Roubados
- Aruanas
- Caminho das Índias
- Cordel Encantado
- Direito de Amar
- Deus Salve o Rei
- Dupla Identidade
- A Fórmula
- Justiça
- Onde Está Meu Coração
- India: A Love Story
- Rock Story
- Salve-se Quem Puder
- Sob Pressão
- Sol Nascente
- Totalmente Demais
- Treze Dias Longe do Sol
- Verdades Secretas

=== Persian drama ===
- Eghma

=== Greek drama ===
- To Tatouaz

== Special events ==
- Academy Awards
- Nickelodeon Kids' Choice Awards
- Academy of Country Music Awards
- American Music Awards
- Brit Awards
- Golden Globe Awards
- Grammy Awards
- Kids' Choice Awards
- Nickelodeon Kids' Choice Awards Abu Dhabi

=== Past special events ===
- Alicia Keys live at Maraya with AlUla Moments (2022)
- Alicia Keys - AlUla Moments (2022)
- Adele One Night Only (2021)
- David Guetta: United At Home - Dubai Edition (2021)
- Nickelodeon Kids' Choice Awards Abu Dhabi (2019)
- Distinctive International Arab Festivals Awards
- Grease: Live (2016)
- Wedding of Prince William and Catherine Middleton (2011)
- Madonna: The Confessions Tour From London (2007)
- Oral Fixation Tour (2007)
- Shakira - Live in Oral Fixation Tour Dubai 2007 (2007)
- Shakira in Dubai 2007 (2007)
- Shakira - Live in Dubai 2007 (2007)
- Shakira - Shakira Oral Fixation Tour Dubai (2007)
- Robbie Williams - Live in Berlin (2005)

=== Music ===
- Adele
- Ariana Grande
- Alicia Keys
- Beyoncé
- BTS
- Britney Spears
- Bridgit Mendler
- Billie Eilish
- Big Time Rush
- Blackpink
- The Cheetah Girls
- Coldplay
- David Guetta
- Demi Lovato
- Dove Cameron
- Elizabeth Gillies
- Emma Roberts
- Ellie Goulding
- Hailee Steinfeld
- Halsey
- Hamza Hawsawi
- Helly Luv
- Michael Jackson
- Hannah Montana
- Madonna
- JoJo Siwa
- Jamie Lynn Spears
- Jessie J
- John Legend
- K-pop
- Keke Palmer
- Katy Perry
- Lady Gaga
- Low Deep T
- Miranda Cosgrove
- Marshmello
- Miley Cyrus
- Mabel
- Nicki Minaj
- Raven-Symoné
- Rihanna
- RedOne
- RedOne
- Robbie Williams
- Ricky Martin
- Selena Gomez
- Shakira
- Stray Kids
- Super Junior-K.R.Y.
- Super Junior-D&E
- Super Junior
- Taylor Swift
- TJ Cases
- Victoria Justice

== Films ==
=== North American films ===
- 10 Things I Hate About You
- 13 Going on 30
- 17 Again
- 27 Dresses
- 500 Days of Summer
- About Schmidt
- Across the Universe
- All Good Things
- Almost Christmas
- All the Pretty Horses
- Almost Famous
- Along Came Polly
- American Beauty
- August Rush
- August: Oscage County
- The Age of Adaline
- A Bad Moms Christmas
- The Bachelor
- Blades of Glory
- Black Nativity
- The Back-up Plan
- The Ballad of Jack and Rose
- Being Julia
- The Best Man
- Bad Moms
- Bewitched
- Black Swan
- Blind Dating
- Blonde Ambition
- Blue Crush
- The Big Wedding
- The Bounty Hunter
- The Brave One
- The Break-Up
- Breakin' All the Rules
- Breaking the Girls
- Burlesque
- Confessions of a Teenage Drama Queen
- Conviction
- Crazy, Stupid, Love
- Contagion
- Crossroads
- The Curse of the Jade Scorpion
- Christmas with the Kranks
- The Devil Wears Prada
- Down With Love
- Dreamgirls
- The Disappearance of Eleanor Rigby
- Dinner for Schmucks
- Easy A
- Eat Pray Love
- Ever After
- Failure to Launch
- Fame
- The Family Stone
- Flightplan
- Fools Rush In
- Friends with Benefits
- Garden State
- Ghost in the Shell
- Ghost Town
- The Girl on the Train
- Gravity
- A Good Woman
- Hairspray
- Hanging Up
- The Heartbreak Kid
- Hell's Kitchen
- Hitch
- The Help
- Hope Floats
- House of Sand and Fog
- The Hundred-Foot Journey
- How Do You Know
- How to Lose a Guy in 10 Days
- I Could Never Be Your Woman
- I Love You, Man
- In Good Company
- In Her Shoes
- It's a Boy Girl Thing
- I Am Number Four
- Jawbreaker
- Just Wright
- Lady in the Water
- The Lake House
- The Light Between Oceans
- The Last Kiss
- Le Divorce
- Legally Blonde
- Legally Blonde 2: Red, White & Blonde
- Little Black Book
- Little Fockers
- Mamma Mia
- Margot at the Wedding
- Meet the Fockers
- Meet the Parents
- The Mistress of Spices
- Mona Lisa Smile
- Monster-in-Law
- Mozart and the Whale
- New in Town
- New York Minute
- New Year's Eve
- Nick & Norah's Infinite Playlist
- Norbit
- No Strings Attached
- One for the Money
- One Last Dance
- Office Christmas Party
- The Phantom of the Opera
- Picture Perfect
- Prime
- The Prince & Me
- The Prince & Me 2: The Royal Wedding
- The Prince & Me 3: A Royal Honeymoon
- The Prince & Me 4: The Elephant Adventure
- The Princess Diaries
- The Princess Diaries 2: Royal Engagement
- Proof
- P.S.
- Remember Me
- Revolutionary Road
- Salt
- Sydney White
- Save the Last Dance
- Serendipity
- Stuck in Love
- Shall We Dance?
- She's Out of My League
- She's the Man
- Shopgirl
- Simply Irresistible
- Something's Gotta Give
- Step Up
- Step Up 2: The Streets
- Step Up 3D
- The Stepford Wives
- Sweet Home Alabama
- Sweet November
- Sabrina
- There's Something About Mary
- Titanic
- Totally Spies! The Movie
- The Tourist
- Tully
- Twilight
- The Twilight Saga: Breaking Dawn – Part 1
- The Twilight Saga: Breaking Dawn – Part 2
- The Twilight Saga: Eclipse
- The Twilight Saga: New Moon
- Two Weeks Notice
- Up in the Air
- The Ugly Truth
- Valentine's Day
- Vanity Fair
- View from the Top
- Waitress
- We Don't Live Here Anymore
- Wedding Crashers
- The Wedding Date
- Wedding Daze
- The Wedding Singer
- Win a Date with Tad Hamilton!
- What Men Want
- Weather Girl
- We're the Millers

=== Russian-language films ===
- Battle for Sevastopol

=== British films ===
- Bridget Jones's Baby
- Bridget Jones's Diary
- Bridget Jones: The Edge of Reason
- Bride & Prejudice
- Definitely, Maybe
- Love Actually
- Pride & Prejudice
- Provoked
- Sliding Doors
- Tamara Drewe

=== Spanish-language films ===
- The Invisible Guest
- It's Now or Never
- Three Steps Above Heaven
- El que busca encuentra
- American Curious

=== Direct-to-video and television films ===
- 12 Men of Christmas
- Britney: For the Record
- I Me Wed
- Legacy
- Life-Size
- The Lion in Winter

=== Hindi-language films ===
- Monsoon Wedding

=== Turkish-language films ===
- 4N1K
- 8 Seconds
- A Small September Affair
- Acı Tatlı Ekşi
- Aşk Geliyorum Demez
- Aşk Bu Mu?
- Aşk Tutulması
- Aşk Yolu
- Asmalı Konak: Hayat
- Âdem'in Trenleri
- Babam
- Bir Aşk Hikayesi
- Cute & Dangerous
- Çocuklar Sana Emanet
- Delibal
- The Crimean
- Everything About Mustafa
- Gülizar
- Gallipoli: End of the Road
- İlk Aşk
- Janjan
- Kötü Çocuk
- Kardeşim Benim
- Kardeşim Benim 2
- Love, Bitter
- Mustang
- Mutluluk Zamanı
- Magic Carpet Ride
- Mahpeyker: Kösem Sultan
- My Father and My Son
- My Grandfather's People
- Öteki Taraf
- Okul
- Rüzgar
- Red Istanbul
- Türkan
- Son Ders
- Seni Seviyorum Adamım
- Sonsuz Aşk
- The Sultan's Women
- Yüreğine Sor
- Veda

=== Chinese-language films ===
- Step Up: Year of the Dance

=== Film blocks ===
- Brought to you by Zain Movies 10 p.m. KSA / 9 p.m. CLT
- Clean & Clear Girls' Night In: Every Thursday 9 p.m. KSA / 8 p.m. CLT
- Clean & Clear Girls Only Movie Time: Every Thursdays and Fridays 10 p.m. KSA / 9 p.m. CLT
- Friday Movie Night: Fridays 8 p.m. KSA / 7 p.m. CLT
- Girls' Night In Movies: Every Friday 9 p.m. KSA / 8 p.m. CLT
- Movies: Every Night 11 p.m. KSA / 10 p.m. CLT
- Movies: Every Thursday and Friday 8 p.m. KSA / 7 p.m. CLT
- Movies: Every Thursdays and Fridays 9 p.m. KSA / 8 p.m. CLT
- Movies: Every Thursdays and Fridays 10 p.m. KSA / 9 p.m. CLT
- Turkish Movies: Every Thursdays and Fridays 10 p.m. KSA / 9 p.m. CLT
- Turkish Movies: Every Friday and Saturday 9 p.m. KSA / 8 p.m. CLT
- Turkish Movies: Every Friday 9:30 p.m. KSA / 8:30 p.m. CLT

== Hosts ==
- Raya Abirached (Correspondent at Hollywood);
- Ramzy Malouki (Correspondent at Hollywood);
