= Rodin Alper Bingöl =

Turkish creative director

- Born: May 22, 1984 (age 42); Istanbul, Turkey
- Education: Istanbul Bilgi University; Visual Communication Design
- Occupations: Creative Director; Entrepreneur; Head of Agency; Founder of the RBM (Removing Barriers Movement)
- Known for: Column, Interviews
- Website: rodinalper.com

Rodin Alper Bingöl (born May 22, 1984), is a Turkish creative director, entrepreneur and business leader known with his works in advertisement, design, digital campaigns and social responsibility.

== Biography ==
Bingöl was born in Istanbul in 1984. He had his first digital experiences in 1996 while he was building amateur web sites and web platforms which were the pioneers of the internet industry in Turkey. During his years in high school, becoming interested in acting, he took acting classes at the Stage of Kadıköy Public Training Center for two years.

In 2002, he graduated from the mechanical department of the Haydarpaşa Anatolian Technical High School. He worked as a designer and instructor at the Bilge Adam Computer Education Center in his last year at high school. Excelling at his business life by becoming an art director, he decided to leave the Center in 2003.

He continued his education at the Faculty of Visual Communication Design at the Istanbul Bilgi University. In his first year, he established Colors of Bilgi, one of the most active and efficient student clubs of the Istanbul Bilgi University. As the general coordinator and the art director of the magazine published by the club, he organized photo shoots and interviews with public figures such as Cem Yılmaz, Serdar Erener, Metin Arolat ve Ali Nesin and got the chance to use his passion for photography. As the first student from the Faculty of Communication who participated in the elections, he was the leader and the creative director of the advertising campaigns of the team “Bilgistanbul” in the 2007 Student Union Elections.

Between 2004 and 2006 he cofounded Colors of USA, the first online Work and Travel firm in Turkey. He traveled to many countries, including United States of America, England and Mexico for business and marketing purposes.

Besides his education, he took part in many different projects as the art and project director. He worked with artists such as Tarkan, Cem Yılmaz, Çağan Irmak and Zeki Demirkubuz; he designed and executed web sites, movie posters and advertising campaigns by creating unique concepts. He contributed to the projects of some of the biggest companies including Swiss Hotel, Bilge Adam, Aviva, Tüpraş and Ülker. The official movie posters for Çağan Irmak's Issız Adam, Zeki Demirkubuz's Envy and Tuna Kiremitçi's Adını Sen Koy were some of the creative works done by Bingöl in this period of time.

While he was still a student, he gave lectures at the Marmara University in the 2008–2009 academic year, focusing on Digital Marketing and Media Technologies. Described as a “Young Talent” by various media organizations, Bingöl gave interviews to widely read magazines such as Trensetter, Marketing Türkiye, Boxer and Cosmogirl.

He graduated from the Istanbul Bilgi University in 2009 by setting up and executing a social responsibility project, Removing Barriers Movement as his thesis. The project gathered a lot of public attention. Celebrities including Ahmet Mümtaz Taylan, Ali Poyrazoğlu, Ali Sunal, Aslıgül Atasagun, Ayçin İnci, Ayşenur Yazıcı, Barış Falay, Bengü, Bora Cengiz, Burcu Kara, Bülent Şakrak, Doğa Rutkay, Ebru Akel, Emre Altuğ, Erdem Yener, Hayko Cepkin, Lale Mansur, Mert Fırat, Mustafa Üstündağ, Müşfik Kenter, Özge Uzun, Pit10, Saba Tümer, Taner Birsel, Tülin Özen, Yetkin Dikinciler acted voluntarily in the promotional clips of the Project.

In addition to his prior achievements, he was awarded first place by JCI Turkey at the “Turkey’s The Most Successful Young Persons of the Year Contest”.

Fark Yaratanlar, CNN Türk’s TV show which is hosted by Cüneyt Özdemir, defined Bingöl as “a real hero”.

In 2009, with the help of his former business experiences, he founded Elmalma Brand Communication. As the creative director and the manager of the Agency, he developed many projects contributing to the progress of the digital opportunities and efficient use of the social media both in Turkey and the World.

Along with artists such as Cem Yılmaz, Murat Boz, Demet Akalın, Yılmaz Erdoğan, Ömer Faruk Sorak Bingöl provided digital services for corporate brands including Fida Film, Böcek Yapım, Saran Holding, LTB, Show TV

In July 2011, Elmalma Brand Communication teamed up with Böcek Yapım which is run by the director Ömer Faruk Sorak and Oğuz Peri.

== Awards ==
Year	Institution	Award
2009	Junior Chamber Turkey	TOYP ’09 (Ten Outstanding Young Persons) - Contribution to Human Rights, Children and World Peace – First Place
2010	Turkish Psychological Counseling and Guidance Association	Empathy Award of the Year
2010	Justice Academy of Turkey	Social Contribution Award

== See also ==
- Removing Barriers Movement
