= Hacıoğlu =

Hacıoğlu is a Turkish surname. Notable people with the surname include:

- Mehmet Hacıoğlu (born 1959), Turkish footballer and manager
- Murat Hacıoğlu (born 1979), Turkish footballer
- İsmail Hacıoğlu (born 1985), Turkish actor. He is also the son of former footballer Mehmet Hacıoğlu
- Ünzile Nur Hacıoğlu (born 1999), Turkish women's volleyball player
