= List of Turkish films of 2008 =

A list of films produced by the Turkish film industry in Turkey in 2008.

== Highest-grossing films ==
Highest-grossing Turkish films of 2008
Rank	Title	Studio	Gross
1	Recep İvedik	Özen Film	$24,632,784
2	A.R.O.G	Fida Film	$19,736,977
3	Muro: Nalet Olsun İçimdeki İnsan Sevgisine	Özen Film	$11,602,503
4	Osmanlı Cumhuriyeti	Avsar Film	$7,746,467
5	Mustafa	NTV	$5,589,390
6	Maskeli Beşler: Kibris	Arzu Film	$5,575,199
7	Çılgın Dersane Kampta	Özen Film	$5,284,100
8	O... Çocukları	Kenda Film	$4,358,771
9	120	Özen Film	$3,327,321
10	Ulak	Avsar Film	$3,120,666

== Released films ==
Opening	Title	Other title	Director	Cast	Genre	Notes	References
07 Nov	Issız Adam	Alone (2008 film)	Çağan Irmak	Melis Birkan, Cemal Hünal	Romance	-	BEYAZPERDE
