= Ayla Dikmen =

Turkish singer

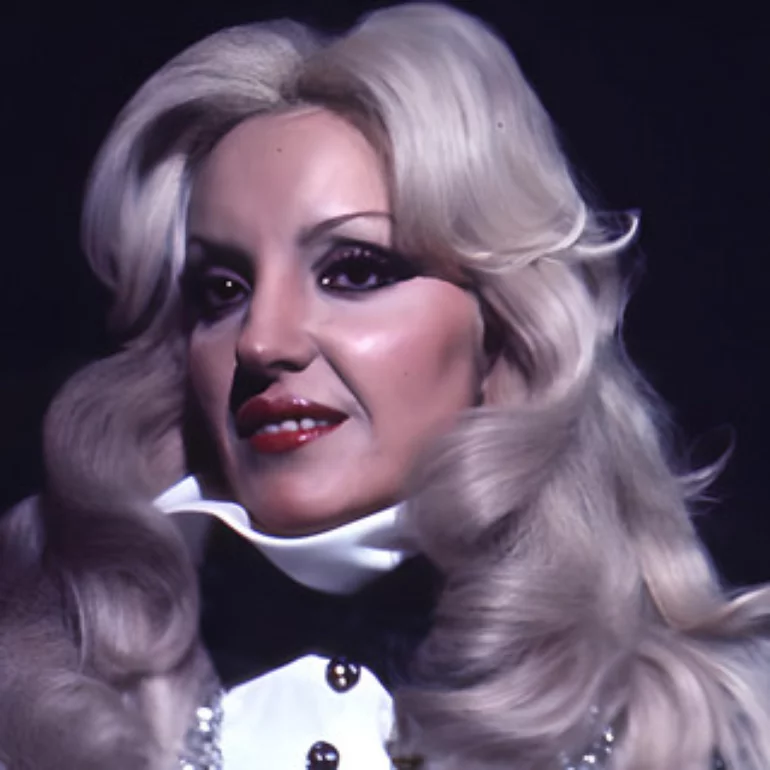

Background information
- Born: 25 March 1944; Kütahya, Turkey
- Died: 20 August 1990 (aged 46) İzmir, Turkey
- Genres: Pop
- Occupation: Singer
- Years active: 1964–1980
- Label: MCC Müzik

Ayla Dikmen (25 March 1944 – 20 August 1990) was a Turkish singer.

== Biography ==
Born in Kütahya on 25 March 1944, Dikmen began her professional singing career with Yavuz Özışık. She met Şerif Yüzbaşıoğlu behind the scenes at a radio program and joined his orchestra under the stage name "Parla Nur". She was selected the best female singer at the second Boğaziçi Music Festival in 1964. In 1965, she won the Balkan Melodileri Festival with the song Niksar'ın Fidanları. Dikmen went on to have a successful music career with several hits like Niksar'ın Fidanları, Yanan Mum, Anlamazdın, Nereye, Aşk Defteri and Zehir Gibi Aşkın Var.

== Death and legacy ==
Ayla Dikmen died of cervical cancer in 1990 at the age of 46. Her hit song Anlamazdın was widely used in Çağan Irmak's 2008 film Issız Adam.

== Discography ==
=== 45's ===
- Niksarın Fidanları / Ay Kız Adın Yamandır (1966)
- Merdiven / Mühür Gözlüm (1967)
- Ayrılık Şarkısı / Seninleyim (1968)
- Sensiz Yaşayamam / Nereye (1970)
- Gençlik Gençlik / Sakın Karşımda Ağlama (1970)
- Yanan Mum / Al Yanaklım (1971)
- Asker Mektubu / Of Aman, Aman (1971)
- Kime Ne Düştü / Hadi Gidelim (1972)
- Bir Gölge Gibi / Sevmeden Kimse Seni (1972)
- Sus Arkadaş / Sonsuz Keder (1973)
- Aşk Defteri / Öpücük (1974)
- Yolcu Yolunda Gerek / Kalbime Kanımla Yazdım Adını (1974)
- Çoban Pınarı / Ay Ay Ay (1975)
- Yeniden seveceğim / Kim Dinler Sizi (1975)
- Hu Bismillah / Anlamadın Mı (1976)
- Benim Kaderim Bu / Hadi İçelim (1976)
- Onu Bunu Bilmem Kararlıyım / İlk Ve Son Aşkımsın (1978)

=== Full length ===
- Ayla Dikmen (Coşkun Plak-1976)
- Göz Bebeğim (Coşkun Plak-1980)

=== Posthumous albums ===
- Seninle Sonsuza Kadar (MCC Müzik-2007)
- Ayla Dikmen Klasikler (MCC Müzik-2008)
