= Fikret Kuşkan =

Turkish actor (born 1965)

- Born: Mehmet Fikret Kuşkan; 22 April 1965 (age 61); Istanbul, Turkey
- Occupation: Actor
- Spouses: Bahar Kerimoğlu (m. 2005; div. 2009) Arsevi Özkara (m. 2014)
- Children: 2

Mehmet Fikret Kuşkan (born 22 April 1965) is a Turkish actor.

Kuşkan grew up in İstinye with his parents and four sisters. His father was of Albanian origin. When he was 13, his father died and he moved to Tokat. After three years, he returned to İstanbul and began studying at Hasköy Lisesi. He graduated from Istanbul University's theatre conservatory.

Kuşkan made his film debut in Sis which was written by Zülfü Livaneli and played the role of a photographer in the TRT series Gençler. He appeared in İki Başlı Dev with Cüneyt Arkın. Next, he starred in Ömer Kavur's Gizli Yüz which he followed with roles in C Blok, Çakalların İçinde, Yaz Yağmuru, Sahte Dünyalar, Özlem Düne Bugüne Yarına, Aşk Üzerine Söylenmemiş Herşey, Deniz Bekliyordu, Kurtuluş, Avcı and Dokuz.

Kuşkan then successfully starred in a series of Çağan Irmak's productions Yolculuk, Mustafa Hakkında Herşey, Babam ve Oğlum and Kabuslar Evi. He was given the Best actor award at the 25th Istanbul Film Festival for his performance in Babam ve Oğlum.

== Filmography ==
Films
Year	Title	Role	Notes
1988	Sis	Murat	First cinematic role
1990	Gizli Yüz	Photographer	
1990	İki Başlı Dev	Hakan Özkan	
1992	Dönersen Islık Çal	Travesti	
1993	C-Blok	Hâled	
1993	Yaz Yağmuru		
1995	Aşk Üzerine Söylenmemiş Herşey	Yazar	
1995	Özlem...Düne, Bugüne, Yarına		
1997	Avcı		
1999	Issızlığın Ortasında	Nazlıgül	
2000	Dansöz	İsa	
2000	Muhallebicinin Oğlu	Suat	
2001	Şellale	Cemal	
2002	9	Tunç	
2002	Abdülhamit Düşerken	Enver Bey	
2002	Hititler		
2003	Mustafa Hakkında Herşey	Mustafa	
2003	Anlat İstanbul	Rafet	
2005	Babam ve Oğlum	Sadık	
2005	Sen Ne Dilersen	Musa	
2013	Erkekler	Adem	
2018	Bizim İçin Şampiyon	Özdemir Atman	
2019	Mucize 2: Aşk	Vedat Zenginer	
2021	Âkif	Mustafa Kemal Atatürk	
2023	Roza	Hüseyin	
2024	Cem Karaca'nın Gözyaşları	Mehmet Karaca	
2025	Bi' Umut		
2025	Bak Postacı Geliyor		
Television
Year	Title	Role	Notes
1989	Gençler	Sinan	
1991	Issızlığın Ortası	Ayhan	
1993	Çakalların İzinde		
1995	Sahte Dünyalar		
1996	Kurtuluş	Kemrelik Yüzbaşı	
1996	Şaşıfelek Çıkmazı	Cesur	
2002	Emanet	Abdurahmanın oğlu	
2003	Esir Şehrin İnsanları	İhsan	
2003	Gelin	Mustafa	
2003	Kasabanın İncisi	Belediye Başkanı Sedat	
2003	Şapkadan Babam Çıktı	Celal	
2004	Adı Aşk Olsun	Çınar	
2004	Çemberimde Gül Oya	Yönetmen Kahraman	
2005	Güz Yangını	Oflaz	
2006	Hacı	Faruk Gesili	
2006	Kabuslar Evi: Takip	İbrahim	
2007	Bıçak Sırtı	Orhan Ertuğrul	
2007–2009	Parmaklıklar Ardında	Ahmet	
2009–2011	Hanımın Çiftliği	Orhan	
2011–2012	Hayat Devam Ediyor	İsmail Bakırcı	
2014	Yasak	Nazım Bey	
2014	Tanıklar	Adnan Kahveci	
2016	Çifte Saadet	Metin Saadet	
2017–2018	Kızlarım İçin	Yaşar	
2019–2020	Zalim İstanbul	Agah Karaçay	
2021	Elkızı	Resul Bozdağlı	
2022	Kaçış	Oktay Tunahan	
2024	Mehmed: Fetihler Sultanı	Loukas Notaras	Leading role
2026	Aynı Yağmur Altında	Umur Karanoğlu	
2026	Evlilik Güzeldir	Mesut Bahtiyar	
Television film
Year	Title	Role	Notes
1996	Deniz Bekliyordu		
2000	Artık Çok Geç	Haydar	
2005	Yolculuk	Efran	

== Awards and nominations ==
Year	Nominee / work	Award	Result
1991	28th Antalya Golden Orange Film Festival	"Best Actor", (Gizli Yüz)	Won
2002	14th Ankara International Film Festival	"Best Actor", (9)	Won
2006	25th International Istanbul Film Festival	"Best Actor", (Babam ve Oğlum)	Won
