= Wish Me Luck (disambiguation) =

Wish Me Luck is a British television drama set during the Second World War.

Wish Me Luck may also refer to:

- Wish Me Luck (film), a 2001 Turkish film
- Wish Me Luck (novel), a 1997 novel by James Heneghan
- "Wish Me Luck...", a 1995 episode of television sitcom Goodnight Sweetheart

== See also ==
- "Wish Me Luck as You Wave Me Goodbye", a song
