= Hakan Boyav =

Turkish actor

- Born: January 10, 1964 (age 62); Ödemiş, Turkey
- Occupation: Actor
- Years active: 1988–present
- Spouse: Nermin Boyav

Hakan Boyav (born 10 January 1964) is a Turkish actor.

He has participated in many serials and is also a theater director who has participated in many plays, films and series.

== Theatre ==
=== As director ===
- At: Julius Gyula Hay - Istanbul State Theatre - 2011
- Matruşka: Tuncer Cücenoğlu - Adana State Theatre - 2010
- Misery: Stephen King\Simon Moore - Adana State Theatre - 2009
- Rezervuar Kanişleri: Bülent Usta - İzmir State Theatre - 2009
- Ayyar Hamza: Ali Bey - Ankara State Theatre\Van State Theatre - 2008
- Rhinoceros: Eugène Ionesco - Antalya State Theatre - 2007
- The Lieutenant of Inishmore: Martin McDonagh - Van State Theatre - 2006
- Ada: Athol Fugard - Antalya State Theatre - 2006
- Perfect Wedding: Robin Hawdon - Konya State Theatre - 2005
- The Government Inspector: Nikolai Gogol - Erzurum State Theatre - 2005
- Sersem Kocanın Kurnaz Karısı: Haldun Taner - Van State Theatre - 2004
- Umut cinayeti: Burak Mikayil Uçar - Ankara State Theatre - 2002
- Rhinoceros: Eugène Ionesco - Ankara State Theatre - 1999
- Şişedeki Balık - Diyarbakır State Theatre
- Çiçek Çölü: Hakan Boyav - Dokuz Eylül University School of Fine Arts - 1987

=== As actor ===
- Nafile Dünya: Oktay Arayıcı - Ankara State Theatre - 2003
- Çiçekleri Sarı Kıza Yedirdim: Nihat Genç - Ankara State Theatre - 2003
- The Dumb Waiter: Woody Allen - Ankara State Theatre - 2002
- Aşk Öldürür: Vladimir Volkoff - Ankara State Theatre - 1999
- Ziyaretçi: Éric-Emmanuel Schmitt - Ankara State Theatre - 1998
- At: Julius Gyula Hay - Ankara State Theatre - 1998
- Blood Wedding: Federico García Lorca - Ankara State Theatre - 1997
- Gilgamesh: Zeynep Avcı - Ankara State Theatre - 1996
- The Idiot: Fyodor Dostoevsky\Simon Gray - Ankara State Theatre - 1995
- The Got “Final”: Woody Allen - Ankara State Theatre - 1994
- Good: Cecil Philip Taylor - Ankara State Theatre - 1994
- Savaş Baba: Iakovos Kambanellis - Ankara State Theatre - 1994
- Sersem Kocanın Kurnaz Karısı: Haldun Taner - Antalya State Theatre - 1993
- Ayyar Hamza: Ali Bey - Diyarbakır State Theatre - 1988
- Şişedeki Balık

== Filmography ==
Film
| Year | Title | Role | Notes |
|---|---|---|---|
| 2004 | Bir Aşk Hikayesi | Hüsnü | |
| 2005 | Hırsız Var! | Muammer | |
| 2007 | Barda | Patlak Osman | |
| 2007 | Hayattan Korkma | Bedrettin | |
| 2008 | Vali | Korcan | |
| 2009 | Black Field | Turkish commander | |
| 2009 | The International | Ahmet Sunay's bodyguard | |
| 2010 | Ejder Kapanı | Correspondent | |
| 2011 | Ay Büyürken Uyuyamam | Hüsam | |
| 2011 | Behzat Ç. Seni Kalbime Gömdüm | Kolsuz Ahmet | |
| 2017 | Cingöz Recai: Bir Efsanenin Dönüşü | Ayıboğan | |
Television
| Year | Title | Role | Notes |
| 2003 | Asmalı Konak | Ahmet | |
| 2004 | Arapsaçı | Remzi | |
| 2005 | Seher Vakti | Avni | |
| 2006 | Fırtına | | |
| 2005–2007 | Hırsız Polis | Kaporta Yakup | 50 episodes (1–50) |
| 2007 | Dağlar Delisi | Aydın Bey | |
| 2007 | Duvar | Selim | |
| 2008 | Kalpsiz Adam | Chauffeur Seyfi | |
| 2008 | Gece Gündüz | Hayalet İrfan | |
| 2009–2011 | Hanımın Çiftliği | Berber Reşit | 70 episodes (1–70) |
| 2011–2014 | Kurtlar Vadisi Pusu | Kara/Mazhar Yıldıran | 104 episodes (129–232) |
| 2014 | Beyaz Karanfil | Başkomiser Salih Yılmazsoy | 6 episodes (1–6) |
| 2016 | Kış Güneşi | Kadim | 18 episodes (1–18) |
| 2017–2021 | Payitaht: Abdülhamid | Mahmud Celâleddin Pasha | 154 episodes (1–154) |
| 2021 | Maraşlı | Yavuz İnce (Hurdacı) | 8 episodes (19–26) |
| 2021–2022 | Teşkilat | Tövbekar (Sadık Özmertli) | 34 episodes (15–48) |
| 2022 | Balkan Ninnisi | Daniel | 16 episodes (1–16) |
| 2023– | Dokuz Oğuz | Brigadier Ali Osman Bozkır | |
Streaming series and films
| Year | Title | Role | Notes |
| 2023 | Biz Kimden Kaçıyorduk Anne? | | |
