= Hümeyra =

Turkish singer and actress

- Hümeyra in 1970
- Born: Fatma Hümeyra Akbay; 15 October 1947 (age 79); Istanbul, Turkey
- Occupations: Singer, actress, singer, composer
- Years active: 1968–present

Fatma Hümeyra Akbay (Turkish pronunciation: [hymejˈɾaː akˈbaj]; born 15 October 1947) is a Turkish actress, singer, composer, and lyricist. In the 1970s she was a noted singer and actress. Her popularity with the new generation rose in the 2000s with the hit sitcom Avrupa Yakası, Yalan Dünya by Gülse Birsel. She played in popular youth series "Melekler Korusun" and "Şahsiyet" which won International Emmy Awards. She played in Çağan Irmak's many films like Babam ve Oğlum, Unutursam Fısılda.

== Musical fame ==
In the 1970s, her songs "Kördüğüm", "Sessiz Gemi", "Otuz Beş Yaş" were very successful. Her later albums Tutkulardan İntihar, Beyhude were outside the mainstream. "Tutkulardan İntihar" was one of the first examples of Turkish rap songs.

== Acting ==
She debuted in theater. Her debut acting in a feature film was Talihli Amele. In 1985, with Ferhan Şensoy's "Ortaoyuncular" troupe, she took part in the stage play İçinden Tramvay Geçen Şarkı. In 1986, she won the Golden Orange for Best Supporting Actress Award with her performance in Asiye Nasıl Kurtulur? at Antalya Film Festival. She was also awarded the honorary "Illuminating Apollo" award at the 10th İstanbul International Meeting of Cinema-History in 2007. She has married and divorced actor Fikret Hakan and later director Ömer Kavur.

== Discography ==
=== Singles ===
- "Kördüğüm/Yol" (Yonca Plak, 1969)
- "Je Sais Que Tu Sais / Il Viendra Celui Que J'aime" (Philips, 1969)
- "Ölüm/Olmasa (Güzelliğin On Para Etmez)" (Melodi Plak, 1969)
- "Dilber/Perişan" (Yonca Plak, 1970)
- "Güzel Ne Güzel Olmuşsun/Bana Kara Diyen Dilber" (Yonca Plak, 1970)
- "Yalan Dünya/Ceylan" (Yonca Plak, 1971)
- "Adım Kadın/Ben Sana Mecburum" (Yonca Plak, 1972)
- "Yiğit/Yardan Haber Yok" (1 Numara, 1974)
- "Dönülmez Bir Yoldayım/Ey Sevgili Sevgilim" (EMI, 1975)
- "Otuz Beş Yaş/Susun Ağlayacağım" (EMI, 1975)
- "Sessiz Gemi/Şükür Verdiklerine" (EMI, 1975)
- "Onu Bana Sakla/Sus, Duymasın" (EMI, 1976)
- "Benim Derdim Seninle/Bundan İyisi Can Sağlığı" (EMI, 1977)
- "Seni Bırakamam/Yüzün Yağmurda" (EMI, 1978)
- "Do Do Do Do Si Re Re/Sevdim Seni Bir Kere" (EMI, 1980)
- "Aşk Kapıyı Çalınca/Bir Damla Yaş" (Balet, 1981)

=== Albums (LP/MC/CD) ===
- Anlatamıyorum, (EMI, LP, 1977)
- Benim Şarkılarım (Balet, LP, 1984; Ossi Müzik, CD, 13 August 2010)
- Yıllar Sonra (Sarp Plak, MC, 1988)
- Tutkulardan İntihar (Sarp Plak, MC, June 1990)
- Beyhude (Ada Müzik, CD-MC, 26 March 1997)
- Eski 45'likler (Ada Müzik, CD, 1998)

== Filmography ==
=== Feature films ===
Name	Director	Year
Talihli Amele	Atıf Yılmaz	1980
Kırık Bir Aşk Hikayesi	Ömer Kavur	1981
Mine	Atıf Yılmaz	1982
Köşedönücü	Ferhan Şensoy	1984
Asiye Nasıl Kurtulur?	Atıf Yılmaz	1986
Devlerin Ölümü	İrfan Tözüm	1990
Kurt Kanunu	Ersin Pertan	1991
Yaz Yağmuru		1993
Bir Kadının Anatomisi	Yavuz Özkan	1995
80. Adım	Tomris Giritlioğlu	1996
Babam ve Oğlum	Çağan Irmak	2005
Sınav	Ömer Faruk Sorak	2006
Kabuslar Evi: Son Dans	Çağan Irmak	2006
Ulak	Çağan Irmak	2008
Güneşin Oğlu	Onur Ünlü	2008
Unutma Beni İstanbul		2010
Dedemin İnsanları	Çağan Irmak	2011
Unutursam Fisilda	Çağan Irmak	2014
Kocan Kadar Konuş: Diriliş	Kıvanç Baruönü	2016
Biz Böyleyiz	Caner Özyurtlu	2020

=== TV series ===
- Yerim Seni
- Üzgünüm Leyla
- Estağfurullah Yokuşu
- Avrupa Yakası
- Sıla
- Melekler Korusun
- Muhteşem Yüzyıl
- Annem Uyurken
- Yalan Dünya
- Paramparça
- Şahsiyet
- Kadın
- Yüz Yıllık Mucize
