= Goncagül Sunar =

Turkish actress

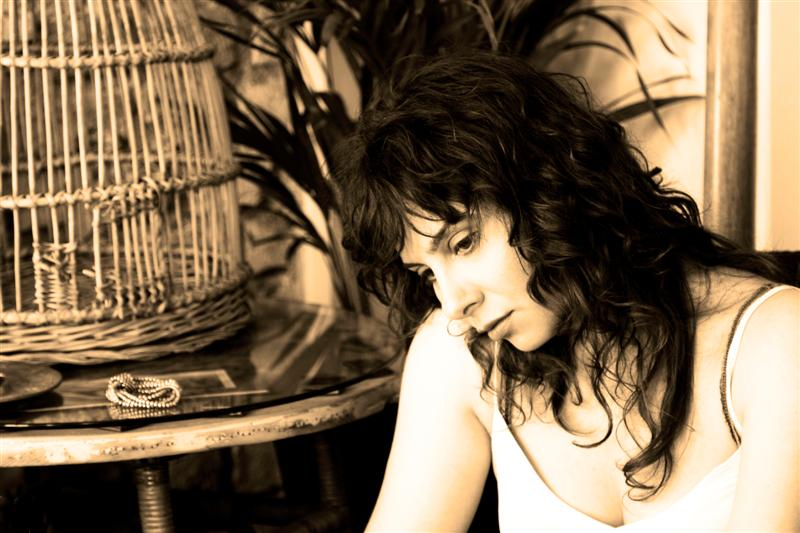
- Born: 17 September 1970 (age 54); Istanbul, Turkey
- Occupation: Actress
- Years active: 1991–present
- Spouse: Marsel Zalma (m. 2007)
- Children: 1

Goncagül Sunar (born Istanbul, 17 September 1970) is a Turkish theater, cinema and television actress and musician.

She started her artistic career in 1991. She won Best Short Screenplay Award at Flying Broom International Women's Film Festival.

== Filmography ==
Year	Film	Role	Note
1992	Mahallenin Muhtarları	Goncagül	
1994	Küçük Bey		
1999	Günaydın İstanbul Kardeş		
2000	Elephants and Grass	Hostes	
2000	Abuzer Kadayıf	Manken	
2002	Asmalı Konak	Hayriye Soylu	
2003	Asmalı Konak Hayat	Hayriye Soylu	
2004	Çemberimde Gül Oya	Canan Cansev	
2005	Güz Yangını	Zülal	
2005	O Şimdi Mahkum	Mine	
2005	Döngel Karhanesi	Gülsüm	
2006	Fırtına	İklima	
2006	Ahh İstanbul	Yağmur	
2006	Ona Melek Deme	Nejla	
2007	Tatlı İntikam	Arife	
2007	Güzel Günler	Şükriye	
2007	Çemberin Dışında		
2008	Alone	Customer	
2008	Gökten Üç Elma Düştü	Yıldız	
2008	Yol Arkadaşım	Rukiye Elmastaş	
2011	Leyla and Mecnun	Sabiha/Alevsu	guest actress
2012	Umutsuz Ev Kadınları	Nazan	
2013	Muhteşem Yüzyıl	Cevher	
2014	Cinayet	Meryem Borova	
2014	Kaderimin Yazıldığı Gün	Şükran Yörükhan	
2017	Her Şey Mümkün	Arzu	
2018–2019	Bir Litre Gözyaşı	Suna	
2019	Benim Tatlı Yalanım	Pervin/Berrin	
2021–2022	Üç Kuruş	Aysel Tekin	
2022	Mükemmel Eşleşme	Meral	
2022	Canım Merkez		
2023	Vermem Seni Ellere	Emine	
2024	Veda Partisi	Arzu	
