= The Messenger (2008 film) =

- Theatrical poster
- Directed by: Çağan Irmak
- Written by: Çağan Irmak
- Produced by: Şükrü Avşar
- Starring: Çetin Tekindor; Hümeyra Akbay; Yetkin Dikinciler; Şerif Sezer; Kaya Akkaya; Melis Birkan
- Cinematography: Mirsad Herović
- Production company: Avşar Film
- Distributed by: United International Pictures
- Release date: 25 January 2008
- Running time: 109 mins
- Country: Turkey
- Language: Turkish

The Messenger (Turkish: Ulak) is a 2007 Turkish drama film, written and directed by Çağan Irmak, which follows a man who travels from village to village to tell children stories about a messenger named İbrahim. The film, which was selected for film festivals in Istanbul, Adana and Antalya, went on general release across Turkey on January 25, 2008 and is one of the highest grossing Turkish films of 2008.

== Plot ==
A mysterious traveller Zekeriya arrives at a village. He captivates much of the village's people by telling tales of a messenger on horseback named İbrahim. The village becomes divided on him, each one taking on various personalities from other stories.

== Cast ==
- Çetin Tekindor (Zekeriya)
- Hümeyra Akbay (Meryem)
- Yetkin Dikinciler (Tahsin Kıroğlu)
- Şerif Sezer (Esma)
- Kaya Akkaya (Ömer - Yunus)
- Melis Birkan (Emine - Ümmü)
- Feride Çetin (Havva)
- Şener Kökkaya (Kahveci Dursun)
- Mahir İpek (İkram)
- Zuhal Gencer Erkaya (Cemile)
- Mahmut Gökgöz (Selman)

== Release ==
=== Festival screenings ===
- 27th Istanbul International Film Festival (April 5–20, 2008)
- 15th International Adana Golden Boll Film Festival (June 2–8, 2008)
- 45th International Antalya Golden Orange Film Festival (October 10–19, 2008)

== Reception ==
=== Reviews ===
Today's Zaman reviewer Fatih Selvi says this, is the kind of film which, as you watch it, you'll start looking inside. It is as though, from the very beginning of the film to the end, you are wandering around in a fairy tale. But not just as an observer and a listener, rather, as though you are interacting with everything. It is a film that makes viewers ask themselves "is this real, or just a story?" over and over again, starting off somewhat like one of the stories your grandmothers and grandfathers might have told you when you were young. But as the film goes on, following the courier's specific tale, everything changes color suddenly. Perhaps Irmak is trying to tell a story from centuries of years ago with this film. Or perhaps this is a story from these days. But whatever the time frame, the message contained in the story is applicable to yesterday, today and even tomorrow. Maybe the film is an attempt to reach tomorrow using the language of yesterday. In any case, the actors are different but the roles are the same. The director underscores the necessity of people like İbrahim in today's world, with all its vulgarities. While cinematographer Mirsad Herovic captures scenes as beautifully as he did in "Babam and Oğlum," Evanthia Reboutsika's musical score adds incredible sounds and action to the visuals. Hümeyra, Şerif Sezer and Yetkin Dikinciler, as well as all the younger stars of this film, deliver great performances while Çetin Tekindor in the role of Zekeriya is quite unforgettable.
