= Çetin Tekindor =

Turkish actor (born 1945)

- Born: 16 July 1945 (age 81); Sivas, Turkey
- Occupation: Actor
- Years active: 1963–present
- Spouse: Zerrin Tekindor (m. 1987; div. 1999)
- Children: 1

Çetin Tekindor (born 16 July 1945) is a Turkish theatre, cinema, TV series actor and voice actor.

== Biography ==
Çetin Tekindor was born in 1945 in Sivas. After studying theatre at the Ankara State Conservatory, he made his professional acting debut in a play IV. Murat in 1970. Beside acting, he also gave acting lessons at the Hacettepe University State Conservatory and Bilkent University.

In 1983, he made his television debut in Küçük Ağa directed by Yücel Çakmaklı. In 1987, he made his film debut in Kaçamak which starred Başar Sabuncu and Müjde Ar. In 2003 won the Best Actor award at the Ankara Film Festival for his role in Karşılaşma. For his role in Babam ve Oğlum, he won the Best Actor awards at the 13th ÇASOD awards and the 27th SİYAD Turkish cinema awards.

== Theatre ==
Yıl	Title	Playwright	Venue
2008	Educating Rita	Willy Russell	Adana State Theatre
2004	The Government Inspector	Nikolai Gogol	Istanbul State Theatre
2002	King Lear	William Shakespeare	Istanbul State Theatre
2002	Assemblywomen	Aristophanes	Aysa Production Theatre
1999	Lavanta Çiçekler	Marguerite Duras	Ankara State Theatre
1998	Happy End	Bertolt Brecht	Ankara State Theatre
1997	Skylight	David Hare	Ankara State Theatre
1995	Jabberwock	Jerome Lawrence & Robert E. Lee	Ankara State Theatre
1995	Kuvayi Milliye	Nâzım Hikmet	Ankara State Theatre
1993	Woman of the Year	Peter Stone	Ankara State Theatre
1991	Chapter Two	Neil Simon	Ankara State Theatre
1990	The Elephant Man	Bernard Pomerance	Ankara State Theatre
1989	Cumhuriyet Kızı	Memet Baydur	Ankara State Theatre
1987	Yedi Kocalı Hürmüz	Sadık Şendil	Istanbul State Theatre
1986	Who's Afraid of Virginia Woolf?	Edward Albee	Ankara State Theatre
1985	The Physicists	Friedrich Dürrenmatt	Ankara State Theatre
1985	Düşüş	Nahid Sırrı Örik & Kemal Bekir	Ankara State Theatre
1984	Osmancık	Tarık Buğra	Ankara State Theatre
1983	Desire Under the Elms	Eugene O'Neill	Ankara State Theatre
1982	Audience-Unveiling-Protest	Václav Havel	Ankara State Theatre
1980	Ben Kimim	Recep Bilginer	Ankara State Theatre
1979	Hürrem Sultan	Orhan Asena	Ankara State Theatre
1979	Özgürlüğün Bedeli	Emmanuel Roblès	Ankara State Theatre
1978	Children of the Sun	Maxim Gorky	Ankara State Theatre
1978	Die neuen Leiden des jungen W.	Ulrich Plenzdorf	Ankara State Theatre
1977	The Glass Menagerie	Tennessee Williams	Ankara State Theatre
1977	Lady Windermere's Fan	Oscar Wilde	Ankara State Theatre
1976	The Misanthrope	Molière & Jean Bastiste Poqulein	Ankara State Theatre
1976	Emin Diye Biri	Ahmet Muhip Dranas	Ankara State Theatre
1975	Küçük Esma Sultan	Adnan Giz	Ankara State Theatre
1973	Andorra	Max Frisch	Ankara State Theatre
1972	Fatih	Nazım Kurşunlu	Ankara State Theatre
1971	Becket	Jean Anouilh	Ankara State Theatre
1971	Romeo and Juliet	William Shakespeare	Ankara State Theatre
1970	Murat IV	Turan Oflazoğlu	Ankara State Theatre
1967	Bir Bardak Su	Hidayet Sayın	Ankara State Theatre
1963	Hep Vatan İçin	İsa Coşkuner	Ankara State Theatre

== Filmography ==
=== Film ===
Year	Title	Director	Role	References
2017	Ayla	Can Ulkay	Süleyman Dilbirliği	
2017	Babam	Nihat Durak	Yusuf Tunalı	
2011	Dedemin İnsanları	Çağan Irmak	Mehmet Bey	
2010	Av Mevsimi	Yavuz Turgul	Battal Çolakzade	
2010	Dersimiz: Atatürk	Hamdi Alkan	Tarihçi dede	
2007	Ulak	Çağan Irmak	Zekeriya	
2006	İlk Aşk	Nihat Durak	Asaf	
2005	Babam ve Oğlum	Çağan Irmak	Hüseyin Efendi	
2004	Anlat İstanbul	Ümit Ünal	İhsan	
2003	Karşılaşma	Ömer Kavur	Mahmut	
1996	Son Türbedar	Yücel Çakmaklı	Bahtiyar	
1988	Kaçamak	Başar Sabuncu	Orhan	
1984	Yavrularım	Bilge Olgaç	Cemal	

=== Television ===
Year	Title	Director	Role
2026	Çirkin	Burcu Alptekin	Ökkeş
2022–2025	Yalı Çapkını	Burcu Alptekin	Halis Ağa
2018	Mehmed: Bir Cihan Fatihi	Cevdet Mercan	Çandarlı Halil Pasha the Younger
2016–2017	İçerde	Uluç Bayraktar	Celal Duman
2012–2015	Karadayı	Uluç Bayraktar & Cem Karcı	Nazif Kara
2011–2012	Bir Çocuk Sevdim	Cevdet Mercan	Turan Şenoğlu
2010	Deli Saraylı	Aydın Bulut	Hüsrev Binbaşı
2007–2009	Asi	Cevdet Mercan	İhsan Kozcuoğlu
2006	Anadolu Kaplanı	Sibel Kocataş	Osman
2006	Rüya Gibi	Ömür Atay	Adil
2006	Kabuslar Evi: Hayal-i Cihan	Çağan Irmak	Haluk
2005	Ödünç Hayat	Nihat Durak	Edip
2004	Şeytan Ayrıntıda Gizlidir	Cevdet Mercan	Superintendent Nevzat
2003	Çaylak	Nihat Durak	Fuat
2003	Bir İstanbul Masalı	Ömür Atay	Ömer Arhan
2000	Tutku Çemberi	Yaprak Bayraktar (Assistant dir.)	-
2000	Üzgünüm Leyla	Orhan Oğuz	Nihat
1999	Kerem	Halit Refiğ	Ferit
1999–2002	Yılan Hikayesi	Nihat Durak	Sinan (King)
1990	Türk Vakıf Medeniyeti	Şenol Demiröz	-
1988	Ölümünün 400. Yılında Mimar Sinan	Tolgay Ziyal	-
1988	Dönemeç	Okan Uysaler	Şerif
1988	Önce Canan	Ertem Göreç	Ferhat
1983	Küçük Ağa	Yücel Çakmaklı	Mehmet Reşit
1977	Sırça Kümes	-	-

=== Short film ===
Yıl	Title	Director	Writer	Role
2006	Örümcek	Hira Tekindor	Çetin Tekindor	The man at the hotel

=== Commercials ===
Year	Company
2017	Filli Boya
2014	YDA Ankara Park Avenue
2012	Nestlé Chocolate
