= Zeynep Eronat =

Turkish actress (born 1963)

- Born: 9 July 1963 (age 62); Istanbul, Turkey
- Occupations: Actress, voice actress, screenwriter
- Years active: 1985–present
- Awards: 1998 Ankara Art Institute, "Best Actress" (Peynirli Yumurta); 2005–2006 Adana Golden Boll Film Festival and Ankara Film Festival, "Best Supporting Actress" (Sen Ne Dilersen)

Zeynep Eronat (born 9 July 1963) is a Turkish actress.

== Life and career ==
Eronat was born in 1963 in Istanbul. Due to her father's profession, her childhood years were spent in various cities of Turkey. She moved to Ankara from the age of 13. With the encouragement of her mother, she won the Theater Department of the Ankara State Conservatory in 1981 and graduated from there in 1985. She received acting lessons from veteran actors. In the same year, she was appointed to Bursa State Theatre as a trainee artist. She was appointed to the Ankara State Theater in 1987. She is known for her role in various movies and TV series, including Asmalı Konak, Neredesin Firuze, Mustafa Hakkında Her şey and Sen Ne Dilersen.

She retired from Ankara State Theatre during the 2006–2007 season and moved back to Istanbul. Eronat received critical acclaim for her portrayal of the character Ziynet Kara in the series Parmaklıklar Ardında. She was also a regular cast member in the series O Hayat Benim.

== Theatre ==
- Steel Magnolias : Robert Harling - Ankara State Theatre - 2002
- Romulus the Great : Friedrich Dürrenmatt - Ankara State Theatre - 2000
- Bahar Noktası : an adaptation of William Shakespeare's A Midsummer Night's Dream by Can Yücel - Ankara State Theatre - 1993
- Kadınla ile Memur : Aldo Nicolaj - Ankara State Theatre - 1999
- Goya : Antonio Buero Vallejo - Ankara State Theatre - 1998
- Patlat Bir Shakespeare : Semih Sergen - Ankara State Theatre - 1993
- Çocuğum : Margeret Mayo - Ankara State Theatre - 1994
- Tamirci : Refik Erduran - Ankara State Theatre - 1991
- Şeytan Çelmesi : Václav Havel - Ankara State Theatre - 1990
- Troyalı Kadınlar : Sophocles - Ankara State Theatre - 1987
- Sinan : Turan Oflazoğlu - Ankara State Theatre - 1987
- Kısmet : Erhan Gökgücü - Bursa State Theatre - 1986
- Bülbül Sesi Gibi : John Hay Beith\L. du Garde Peach\Roger Ferdinand - Bursa State Theatre - 1986
- Sersem Kocanın Kurnaz Karısı : Haldun Taner - Bursa State Theatre - 1985
- Peynirli Yumurta : Ferenc Karinthy
- Akıllı Tavşan : Nezihe Araz - Bursa State Theatre - 1986
- Yedekçi : Musahipzade Celal - Bursa State Theatre - 1985

== Filmography ==
- Uzak Şehrin Masalı (2021) - Aliye
- Kırmızı Oda (2021) - Gümüş
- Yüzleşme (2019) - Songül Kalenderoğlu
- Dostlar Mahallesi (2017) - Neriman
- O Hayat Benim (2015) - Mücella
- Kızıl Elma (2014) - Meryem Kadıoğlu
- Karakol (2011) - Leyla
- Al Yazmalım (2011) - Fatma Avcı
- Kapalı Çarşı (2009–2010) - Feraye
- Parmaklıklar Ardında (2007–2010) - Ziynet Kara
- Hayattan Korkma (2007) - Zehra
- Sıla (2006-2007) - Bedar
- Sensiz Olmuyor (2005) - Handan
- Sen Ne Dilersen (2005) - Eftimya
- Nehir (2005) - Melek
- Körfez Ateşi (2005) - voiceover
- Köpek (2005) - Hayriye
- Yağmur Zamanı (2004)
- Türkmen Düğünü (2004)
- Ablam Böyle İstedi (2004) - Nermin
- Serseri (2003) - Zehra
- Neredesin Firuze (2003) - Sansar
- Mustafa Hakkında Herşey (2003) - Selda
- Fişgittin Bey (2003)
- Ben Bir İnsan (2002)
- Asmalı Konak (2002) - Piraye
- Vasiyet (2001) - Didar
- Baykuşların Saltanatı (2000)
- Köstebek (1999) - Necef
- Cafe Casablanca (1996)
- Issızlığın Ortası (1991)
