= Tomris İncer =

Turkish actress

- Born: Tomris Zehra İncer; 29 May 1947; Bulgaria
- Died: 5 October 2015 (aged 68); İzmir, Turkey
- Occupation: Actress
- Years active: 1973–2015

Tomris Zehra İncer (29 May 1947 – 5 October 2015) was a Turkish actress.

== Biography ==
İncer was born in 1947 in Bulgaria. In 1974, she started her career on stage by joining the Istanbul City Theatres, and continued her career by appearing in both cinema and television productions. A breakthrough in her career came in 2003 with a role in the TV series Bir İstanbul Masalı.

İncer died on 5 October 2015, shortly after being diagnosed with lung cancer and a brain tumor.

== Theatre ==
- Öldün, Duydun mu? : Yiğit Sertdemir - Altıdan Sonra Theatre - 2013
- Gerçek Hayattan Alınmıştır : Yiğit Sertdemir - Altıdan Sonra Theatre - 2012
- Les Liaisons dangereuses : Pierre Choderlos de Laclos - Istanbul City Theatres - 2010
- The Cloven Viscount : Italo Calvino - Istanbul City Theatres - 2010
- Dünya'nı Ortasında Bir Yer : Özen Yula - Istanbul City Theatres - 2010
- Divane Ağaç : Turgay Nar - Istanbul City Theatres - 2009
- Leonce and Lena : Georg Büchner - Istanbul City Theatres - 2008
- The Immortal Story : Karen Blixen - Istanbul City Theatres - 2007
- Eskici Dükkanı : Orhan Kemal - Istanbul City Theatres - 2006
- Far Away : Caryl Churchill - Istanbul City Theatres - 2005
- Medea : Euripides - Istanbul City Theatres - 2003
- Richard III : William Shakespeare - Istanbul City Theatres - 2001
- Open the Door : Krzysztof Choiński - Istanbul City Theatres - 2001
- Gölge Ustası : Istanbul City Theatres
- Canlı Maymun Lokantası : Güngör Dilmen - Istanbul City Theatres
- Altı Derece Uzak : Istanbul City Theatres
- Mikado'nun Çöpleri : Melih Cevdet Anday - Istanbul City Theatres
- A Midsummer Night's Dream : William Shakespeare - Istanbul City Theatres - 1980

== Filmography ==
- Racon - 2015
- Mahmut İle Meryem - 2012
- Böyle Bitmesin - 2012
- Aşk ve Ceza - 2010
- Usta - 2008
- Tramvay - 2006
- Binbir Gece - 2006
- Yedi Günah, Yedi Tepe, Bir Metropol - 2005
- Bir İstanbul Masalı - 2003
- Aşk ve Gurur - 2002
- Gönlümdeki Köşk Olmasa - 2002
- Karşılaşma - 2002
- Çamur - 2002
- O da Beni Seviyor - 2001
- Bana Old and Wise'ı Çal - 1998
- Kuşatma Altında Aşk - 1997
- Aylaklar - 1994
- Tersine Dünya - 1993
- Gizli Yüz - 1990
- Cumartesi Cumartesi (Anet's voice) - 1984
- At Gözlüğü - 1978
- Azap - 1973

== Awards ==
- 9th Adana Golden Boll Film Festival - 1995, Best Actress, Aylaklar
- 15th Ankara International Film Festival - 2003, Best Supporting Actress, Çamur
- 8th Sadri Alışık Awards - 2003, Best Supporting Actress, Gönlümdeki Köşk Olmasa
- 8th Afife Theatre Awards, Most Successful Actress in a Supporting role, Richard III and Medea, 2004
- Theater Critics Association's Honorary Award - 2015
- Afife Theatre Awards, Most Successful Actress in a Supporting Role, King Lear - 2015
