= Haluk Piyes =

Turkish-German actor (born 1975)

- Born: March 30, 1975 (age 51); Cologne, Germany
- Occupation: actor
- Years active: 1997–present
- Awards: see Awards

Haluk Piyes (born March 30, 1975) is a Turkish-German actor.

== Filmography ==
Film
Year	Film	Role	Notes
2023	Mevlânâ Celâleddîn-i Rûmî	Sinaneddin	
2022	Malazgirt 1071	Afshin Bey	
2016	Ateş		
2015	Bizim Hikaye		
2013	Firuze		
2008	Kanımdaki Barut	Barut	
2007	Refugee	Sivan	
2007	Porno!Melo!Drama!	Bülent	
2007	Pars: Kiraz Operasyonu	Tayfun Karahan	
2006	The Stoning	Majidi - Hamid Rheza	
2004	En Garde	Ilir	
2003	Die Klasse von '99	Gordon	
2002	Der Brief des Kosmonauten	Ruslan	
2001	O da Beni Seviyor	Hüseyin	
2000	Kanak Attack	Ertan	

=== Television ===
Year	Film	Role	Notes
2025	El Turco	Yedder	
2013	Galip Derviş	Selim	Guest appearance
2012	M.U.C.K.	Ozan	
2010	Umut Yolcuları	Nasuh	
2009	Aynadaki Düşman	Murat Sahil	
2007	Pusat	Ali Pusat	13 Episodes
2007	Alarm für Cobra 11 – Die Autobahnpolizei	Nick Bauer	1 Episode
2006	Sahte prenses	Kerem	Mini series
2005	Eylül	Kerem Aktas	Mini series
1999	Die Wache	Bülent	1 Episode
1997	The Cry of Love		

== Awards ==
- 2004 Locarno International Film Festival, Bester Film: En Garde
- 2008 International Film Fest Bukarest, Best Film: "Asyl"
