= Nilgün Belgün =

Turkish actress

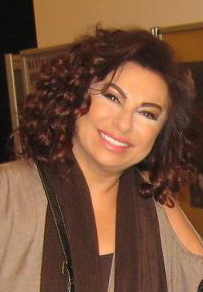
- Born: 18 March 1953 (age 72); Istanbul, Turkey
- Occupation: Actress
- Years active: 1973–present
- Spouses: Abdullah Şahin; İlhan Gencer; Atilla Demircioğlu
- Children: 2
- Website: nilgunbelgun.com.tr

Nilgün Belgün (born 18 March 1953) is a Turkish actress.

== Life and career ==
Belgün studied at the Special Şişli High School and later at the Istanbul Municipal Conservatory. She started her career in 1973. She first went on stage at Devekuşu Cabaret's theatre, and then worked as a stage actress in various locations. After appearing in a number of TV series and movies, her breakthrough came in 1990 with her role in Bir Başka Gece. Aside from her acting career, she made various types of parodies at entertainment shows on TV. She also authored books and worked for the awareness campaign of Turkey Menopause and Osteoporosis Society. She then presented programs on Star TV and TV8.

== Filmography ==
- Jet Sosyete (2019 / 2020) - Olcay Sahici (episodes 30 and 59)
- Akasya Durağı - 2009–2012
- Papatyam - 2011
- Petek Dinçözle 10 Numara - 2010
- Karışık Aile - 2010
- Benim Annem Bir Melek - 2008
- Yağmurdan Sonra - 2008
- Çinliler Geliyor - 2006
- Yalancı Yarim - 2006
- Mavi Kolye - 2004
- 3. Tür - 2004
- Tatil Aşkları - 2004
- Yabancı Damat - 2004
- Beybaba / Koltuk - 2003
- Büyümüş de Küçülmüş - 2003
- Şeytan Bunun Neresinde - 2002
- Şen Kahkahalar - 2001
- Güz Gülleri - 2001
- Bana Şans Dile - 2001
- Bir Demet Kahkaha - 2000
- Adada Bir Sonbahar - 2000
- Baykuşların Saltanatı - 2000
- Kadınlar Kulübü - 1999
- Hayvanlara Dokunduk - 1997
- Köşe Kapmaca - 1996
- Çiçek Taksi - 1995
- Cümbüş Sokak - 1993
- Bizim Mahalle - 1993
- Bıçkın - 1988

== Books ==
- İçimdeki Kadın, Filika Publication
- Bir Kadın Bir Erkek, Filika Publication (with Cengiz Özakıncı)
- Hayat... Sen Benimsin, Doğan Egmont Publication
