= 3 Apples Fell from the Sky =

2008 Turkish drama film

- Theatrical poster
- Turkish: Gökten Üç Elma Düştü
- Directed by: Raşit Çelikezer
- Written by: Raşit Çelikezer
- Produced by: Raşit Çelikezer
- Starring: Ismail Hacioglu; Bennu Yildirimlar; Ayten Uncuoglu
- Cinematography: Mustafa Nuri Eser
- Production company: Defne Film
- Distributed by: Tiglon Film
- Release dates: October 2008 (Antalya); March 6, 2009 (Turkey)
- Running time: 88 minutes
- Country: Turkey
- Language: Turkish

3 Apples Fell from the Sky (Turkish: Gökten Üç Elma Düştü) is a 2008 Turkish drama film produced, written and directed by Raşit Çelikezer. This film was acted by İsmail Hacıoğlu and İlker Ayrık.

== Plot ==
Ali, a young petty thief, runs away from home and seeks refuge with his grandfather in Istanbul. His grandfather, an ex-military disciplinarian who at first did not even recognize his own grandson, is involved in a feud with his upstairs neighbor Nilgun, a middle-aged prostitute. We learn they are not quite what they appear to be in a spiraling chain of events that makes these three seemingly antagonistic characters come closer and closer together.

== See also ==
- 2008 in film
- Turkish films of 2008
