= Şerif Sezer =

Turkish actress

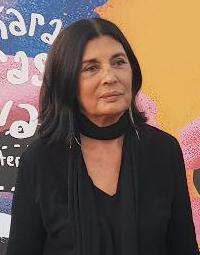
- Şerif Sezer, 2020
- Born: 12 December 1946 (age 79); Mudanya, Turkey
- Education: Ankara University
- Occupation: Actress
- Years active: 1965–present
- Children: 1

Şerif Sezer (born 12 December 1946) is a Turkish actress. She is also known for her roles in Turkish cult films like Everything About Mustafa and My Father and My Son. She was born in Mudanya and has Rumelian, Georgian and Laz roots.

== Selected filmography ==
Film
Year	Title	Role	Notes
2025	When Dandelions Bloom		
2024	Başkan		
2019	Kızım Gibi Kokuyorsun	Emine	
2018	Çocuklat Sana Emanet		
2017	İstanbul Kırmızısı	Annesi	
2015	Menleket	Koca Nane	
2014	The Lamb	Leyla	
2011	After the Revolution		
2010	Secret of the Sultan		
2009	Piano Girl	Popuç	
2007	The Messenger	Esma	
2005	My Father and My Son	Gülbeyaz Teyze	
2003	Everything About Mustafa	Mukadder	
2001	Summer Love		
1997	Hamam	Perran	
1982	Yol	Zine	

Television
Year	Title	Role
2025	Çarpinti	Figen Alkan
2022–2025	Yalı Çapkını	Hatice Şanlı
2019–2021	Benim Adım Melek	Nefise Karadağ
2013–2016	Karagül	Kadriye Şamverdi
2010–2011	Lale Devri	Nedret Ilgaz
2008	Sınıf	Hamiyet
2007	Beyaz Gelincik	Zehra Samur
2007	Yersiz Yurtsuz	Meryem
2002	Asmalı Konak	Kader Hamzaoglu
