= Nejat İşler =

Turkish actor (born 1972)

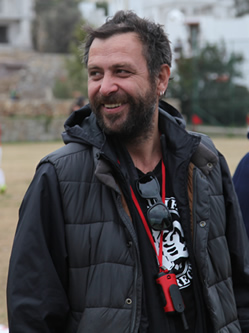
- Nejat İşler at Gümüşlükspor championship, 2016
- Born: 28 February 1972 (age 54); Eyüp, Istanbul, Turkey
- Education: Yıldız Technical University Mimar Sinan Fine Arts University
- Occupation: Actor
- Years active: 1992–present

Nejat İşler (Turkish pronunciation: [neˈʒat iʃˈlæɾ]; born 28 February 1972) is a Turkish actor and writer. He is best known for many hit films including Cannes Film Festivale recipients. Some of his popular series are Behzat Ç, Gülbeyaz, Bıçak Sırtı, Keşanlı Ali Destanı, İntikam, Aliye, and Şehnaz Tango.

== Biography ==
Nejat İşler was born in Eyüp, Istanbul. He studied at Cağaloğlu Anadolu High School, where he joined the theatre group. He took a photography course for two years at Yıldız Technical University, before serving his military service. After which he worked for some time as a salesman. After viewing the play Death of Danton, he became inspired to become an actor and joined Mimar Sinan Fine Arts University Conservatory from where he graduated in theatre.

With two friends, he formed the "Kahramanlar ve Soytarılar Theatre" and "Bodrum Deneme Sahnesi". After making his onscreen debut in the Borsa in 1993, later played films such as Eylül Fırtınası. Mustafa Hakkında Herşey and Anlat İstanbul. He played in the Turkish TV series Behzat Ç. Bir Ankara Polisiyesi as a ruthless villain with a dark sense of humor and honor. He had leading role for same role in spin off series "Saygı". He also appeared as one of the actors in the movies "Behzat Ç. Seni Kalbime Gömdüm", "Behzat Ç. Ankara Yanıyor".

He is the author of the books Gerçek Hesap Bu and Ben Hep Senin Yanındaydım. He is also the president of Gümüşlükspor football team. His paternal side of the family comes from İnebolu, Kastamonu while his maternal side is from Akçaabat, Trabzon.

== Personal life ==
İşler was rushed to the private Bodrum Acıbadem Hospital in January 2014. He was diagnosed with respiratory failure caused by severe pulmonary infection.

== Filmography ==
=== Movies ===
| Year | Title | Role |
|---|---|---|
| 1999 | Eylül Fırtınası | |
| 2004 | Mustafa Hakkında Herşey | Fikret |
| 2004 | Anlat İstanbul | Ramazan |
| 2005 | Çalıntı Gözler | Halil |
| 2006 | 2 Süper Film Birden | Refik Bey |
| 2007 | Barda | Selim |
| 2007 | Yumurta | Yusuf |
| 2007 | Yaşamın Kıyısında | Commissioner |
| 2009 | 11'e 10 kala | Ali |
| 2009 | Ejder Kapanı | Ensar |
| 2010 | Siyah Beyaz | Doctor |
| 2011 | Kaybedenler Kulübü | Kaan Çaydamlı |
| 2011 | Çınar Ağacı | Yağız |
| 2012 | Behzat Ç. Seni Kalbime Gömdüm | Ercüment Çözer |
| 2013 | Behzat Ç. Ankara Yanıyor | Ercüment Çözer |
| 2014 | Kış Uykusu | İsmail |
| 2016 | İkimizin Yerine | Doğan |
| 2017 | İstanbul Kırmızısı | Deniz |
| 2017 | Martıların Efendisi | Cafer |
| 2018 | Kaybedenler Kulübü Yolda | Kaan |
| 2020 | 9,75 | Ahmet |
| 2022 | Tamirhane | Yılmaz |
| 2023 | Oregon | Orçun |
| 2023 | İyi Adamın 10 Günü | Sadık Adil Öçal |
| 2023 | Kötü Adamın 10 Günü | Sadık Adil Öçal |
| 2024 | Meraklı Adamın 10 Günü | Sadık Adil Öçal |
| 2024 | Zaferin Rengi | Mehmet Sabri Toprak |
| 2024 | Evcilik | Özkan |
| 2024 | Barda 2 | cameo |

=== Web series ===
| Year | Title | Role | Notes |
|---|---|---|---|
| 2010–2019 | Behzat Ç. Bir Ankara Polisiyesi | Ercüment Çözer | |
| 2020–2021 | Saygı | Ercüment Çözer | |
| 2022–2024 | Kuş Uçuşu | | voiceover |

=== TV series ===
| Year | Title | Role | Notes |
|---|---|---|---|
| 1993 | Borsa | | |
| 1993 | Tanrı Misafiri | | |
| 1994 | Gurur | | |
| 1994 | Şehnaz Tango | Ergün | |
| 1998 | Dertler Bizim Olsun | | |
| 1998 | Mavi Düşler | | |
| 1999 | Deli Yürek | Oktay | |
| 2001 | Nasıl Evde Kaldım | Metin | |
| 2001 | Dedem, Gofret ve Ben | Murat | |
| 2002 | Aşk ve Gurur | İlhan Timur | |
| 2002–2003 | Gülbeyaz | Kadir Demiroğlu | Leading Role |
| 2003 | Sultan Makamı | | Guest |
| 2003 | Kurşun Yarası | | Guest |
| 2004 | Çemberimde Gül Oya | (himself) | Guest |
| 2004 | Beyaz Gelincik | | Guest |
| 2004 | Şeytan Ayrıntıda Gizlidir | Ali | |
| 2004 | Aliye | Deniz Erbil | |
| 2007–2008 | Bıçak Sırtı | Ali Sinan | |
| 2009 | Kapalıçarşı | Cemal | Season 1 |
| 2009 | Parmaklıklar Ardında | Ahmet | Guest |
| 2011–2012 | Keşanlı Ali Destanı | Keşanlı Ali | |
| 2012 | İntikam | Rüzgâr Denizci | Season 1 |
| 2014 | Benim Adım Gültepe | | voiceover |
| 2017 | Bodrum Masalı | Bora | Joined |
| 2019–2021 | Çukur | Çağatay Erdenet | Joined |
| 2023 | Aile | Cihan Soykan | |

== Theater ==
| Year | Title | Writer | Venue |
|---|---|---|---|
| 1992 | Ferhatın Yeni Acıları | Yüksel Pazarkaya | Istanbul State Theater |
| 1994 | Yeşil Papağan Limitet | Memet Baydur | Istanbul State Theater |
| 1997 | They Shoot Horses, Don't They? | Horace McCoy | Istanbul Show Center |
