= Summer Love (2001 film) =

2001 film by Barış Pirhasan

O da Beni Seviyor
- Directed by: Barış Pirhasan
- Written by: Gül Dirican, Barış Pirhasan
- Produced by: Yavuz Bayraktaroğlu, János Rózsa, Mine Vargı
- Cinematography: Jürgen Jürges
- Edited by: Adnan Elial
- Music by: Mare Nostrum, Ulaş Özdemir
- Release date: 12 October 2001
- Running time: 106 minutes
- Country: Turkey
- Language: Turkish

O da Beni Seviyor or Summer Love is a 2001 Turkish drama film directed and written by Barış Pirhasan with Gül Dirican.

== Cast ==
- Ece Ekşi as Esma Hanım
- Lale Mansur as Saliha
- Luk Piyes as Hüseyin
- Ayla Algan
- Ayşe Nil Şamlıoğlu
- Burak Sergen
- Bezmi Baskın
- Hale Akınlı
- Kemal İnci
- Serra Yılmaz
- Şerif Sezer
- Taner Birsel
- Tomris İncer
- Tuncel Kurtiz
- Uğur Polat
