= Whisper If I Forget =

- Film poster
- Directed by: Çağan Irmak
- Starring: Farah Zeynep Abdullah; Mehmet Günsür
- Cinematography: Gökhan Tiryaki
- Release date: 30 October 2014
- Running time: 118 minutes
- Country: Turkey
- Language: Turkish

Whisper If I Forget (Turkish: Unutursam Fısılda) is a 2014 Turkish drama film directed by Çağan Irmak.

== Cast ==
- Farah Zeynep Abdullah - Hatice (Ayperi)
- Mehmet Günsür - Tarik
- Kerem Bürsin - Erhan
- Hümeyra - Ayperi (older)
- Isil Yücesoy - Hanife (older)
- Gözde Cigaci - Hanife
- Gürkan Uygun - Kemal
- Köksal Engür - Erhan (older)

== Accolades ==
Kenan Doğulu won the Best Soundtrack for “Unutursam Fısılda” and Soydan Kuş won the Best Art Director on the 47th SİYAD Awards.
