= Esra Ronabar =

Turkish actress

- Born: 19 July 1978 (age 47); Ödemiş, Turkey
- Occupation: Actress
- Years active: 1997–present
- Spouse: Barış Falay (m. 2006)
- Children: 1

Esra Ronabar (born 19 July 1978) is a Turkish actress.

== Life and career ==
Ronabar was born in 1978 in Ödemiş. She studied chemistry at Ankara University, but soon started taking acting courses. Altan Erkekli was among her teachers. She then briefly worked with Rutkay Aziz and Metin Balay. Ronabar graduated from School of Language and History – Geography with a degree in theatre studies. Between 1997–1998, she worked for Ankara Art Theatre and had roles in the plays Elmadaki Barış and Küçük Karabalık. In an adaptation of the play Akrep written by Eşber Yağmurdereli and directed by Rutkay Aziz, she worked with Ebru Erkekli as an assistant director. In 1998, she made her television debut with Kader Ayırsa Bile in leading role alongside Ümit Olcay.

Ronabar played in 7 commercials for different brands, including Ülker Cream Chocolate and Alldays. In 2003, she played the role of Cansu in A.G.A. In the same year, she was noted for he role in Bir İstanbul Masalı as Birnur Goyalı. In 2005, she was cast in Beyaz Gelincik, portraying the character of Bahar, a children's doctor. In the same year, she appeared in the Son Osmanlı series.

Ronabar married actor Barış Falay in July 2006.

In 2007, she had a role in the drama movie Hayattan Korkma, directed and written by Berrin Dağçınar. Between 2007–2008, she joined Kocaeli Metropolitan Municipality City Theatre and played roles in adaptations of The Servant of Two Masters and Oyun Nasıl Oynanmalı. With her role as Sevil in Oyun Nasıl Oynanmalı, written by Vasıf Öngören and directed by Ömer Akgüllü, she won the İsmet Küntay Judges Special Award at the 33rd İsmet Küntay Theatre Awards in 2008.

In 2009, her son Mavi Rüzgâr was born.

In 2010, Ronabar portrayed the character of Şahane in the Küstüm Çiçeği series and began working for the Istanbul City Theatres in the same year. There she was among the cast of Les Liaisons dangereuses and Dünyanın Ortasında Bir Yer. With her role as Ahten in Dünyanın Ortasında Bir Yer, written by Özen Yula and directed by M. Nurullah Tuncer, she won the Best Actress award at the 36th İsmet Küntay Theatre Awards in 2011. In 2012, she played the role of a dealer named Nur Sertaç in Uçurum.

In 2013, Ronabar was cast in a leading role in the fantastic drama series Sana Bir Sır Vereceğim. After portraying the character of Sevgi Gündoğdu for 12 episodes, but suffered injuries in September 2013 in a car crash in Bahçeköy on her way to the filming set. Ronabar, who suffered many fractures during the crash, underwent a 5.5-hour operation. The platinum attached to her arm broke after another accident she had in January 2014 while she was about to recover. Due to these injuries, she was forced to leave the cast of Sana Bir Sır Vereceğim.

== Theatre ==
- Les Liaisons dangereuses : Choderlos de Laclos - Istanbul City Theatres - 2011
- Dünyanın Ortasında Bir Yer : Özen Yula - Istanbul City Theatres - 2010
- Oyun Nasıl Oynanmalı : Vasıf Öngören - Kocaeli Metropolitan Municipality City Theatre - 2008
- The Servant of Two Masters - Carlo Goldoni - Kocaeli Metropolitan Municipality City Theatre - 2007
- Karar Kimin (Whose Life Is It Anyway?) - Brian Clark - Kocaeli Metropolitan Municipality City Theatre - 2004
- Küçük Karabalık : Nilbanu Engindeniz - Ankara Art Theatre - 1997
- Elmadaki Barış : Samed Behrengi - Ankara Art Theatre - 1997

== Filmography ==
Film
Year	Title	Role	Notes
2007	Hayattan Korkma	Zilli Emine	
Streaming series and films
Year	Title	Role	Platform
2022–	Çekiç ve Gül: Bir Behzat Ç. Hikayesi	Engin Demirdelen	BluTV
2023	İyi Adamın 10 Günü	Maide	Netflix
2023	Kötü Adamın 10 Günü	Maide	Netflix
2023	Deneme Çekimi	Ayşe	BluTV
Television
Year	Title	Role	Notes
1998	Kader Ayırsa Bile	Suna	Leading role
2003	Bir İstanbul Masalı	Birnur Goyalı Arhan	
2003	A.G.A	Cansu	
2005	Son Osmanlı		
2005–2007	Beyaz Gelincik	Bahar	
2010	Küstüm Çiçeği	Şahane	
2012	Uçurum	Nur Sertaç	Leading role
2013–2014	Sana Bir Sır Vereceğim	Sevgi Gündoğdu	Leading role
2015	Tatlı Küçük Yalancılar	Ilgın	Guest appearance
2017	Cennet'in Gözyaşları	Arzu/Cavidan Soyer	Leading role
2021	Kırmızı Oda	Nihal Karahanoğlu	Guest role
2021	Benim Hayatım	Handan	Leading role
2026–present	Sevdiğim Sensin	İnci Aldur	Supporting role

== Awards ==
- 2011: 36th İsmet Küntay Theatre Awards, "Best Actress" (Dünyanın Ortasında Bir Yer as Ahten)
- 2008: 33rd İsmet Küntay Theatre Awards, "İsmet Küntay Judge Special Award" (Oyun Nasıl Oynanmalı as Sevil)
