= Removing Barriers Movement =

- Founded: January 2009 by Rodin Alper Bingöl in Turkey
- Type: Non-profit; NGO
- Location(s): Global Headquarters in Istanbul
- Services: Protecting human rights
- Fields: Media attention, direct-appeal campaigns, research, lobbying
- Members: More than 300.000 members and supporters
- Key people: Rodin Alper Bingöl (Founder)
- Website: www.engellerikaldir.com

Removing Barriers Movement (RBA), is an international non-governmental organization and movement based in İstanbul. The organization is run by humanitarian volunteers working for human rights.

== History ==
Removing Barriers Movement (RBM) is created by Rodin Alper Bingöl a senior student in visual communications design at Bilgi University in January 2009. The project started as a thesis and has grown with the support of many organizations and the community.

Elmalma Brand Communication is currently in charge of the administration and execution of the movement and its projects.

== Principles ==
RBM takes start with the aim of reaching a social order where the sensitivity and awareness of the violations are at the center. It prospects an ideal community which is using and being aware about their rights that are stated in the Universal Declaration of Human Rights and any other similar texts related with the violations against the internationally recognized human rights.

RBM takes 8 core values as its base in its future and present projects and in the interactions it establishes with all individuals, organizations and associations. These 8 core values are: Independence, Justice, Equality, Sensitivity, Tolerance, Respectfulness, Solidarity, Modernism, and Transparency.

RBM aims to create a social consciousness and awareness that will help to remove all kinds of physical and intellectual barriers in Turkey, fight for the violation of human rights and integrate people to social and production processes who are being viewed as “disabled” and therefore outcast by the society.

== Organisation ==
RBM come up with projects to generate adequate methods and strategies to find permanent solutions in the purpose of creating a social awareness to the human right violations. Participants in the management of RBM are selected from the people who are specialized in their areas. People working under the commissions of law, communication, infrastructure and architecture, psychology-sociology create concrete and specific projects. Volunteers who give part-time support or get involved in specific projects also contribute to the functioning of the RBM.

== Work ==
RBM’s target audience does not only consist of, blind, paralyzed or deaf people. RBM also targets the “disabled” women whose freedom of working is restricted, children whose right of being a child is prevented and generally all people whose freedom of expression is restricted. Beside these targeted groups, the “unhindered” people that has the power to remove barriers but not aware about what he/she can do in that manner is the other major target group.

== Funding ==
RBM carries out its projects without donations collected from the society. Sponsors, organizations and individuals that are in corporation with the RBM, support the accomplishments of projects with their creative ideas and technological supports. The money collected under the regulation of associations with the establishment of Association of Independent Living, is used in realizing the projects that aim to find permanent solutions.

== Notable Campaigns ==
=== April Fool’s Day Campaign ===
Taking its inspiration from the first day of April, which is considered as a hoax day, Removing Barriers Movement wanted to raise public awareness and stress the fact that there are over 8.5 million of people with disabilities (and their parents taken into account; a total number of 20 million people having difficulties in their daily lives). The campaign used the motto “This is not a joke!”.

With the help of its supporters including Microsoft, UPS, Hürriyet, The Spinal Cord Paralytics Association of Turkey, Solidarity Association for the Physical Disabled and many other institutions, Removing Barriers Movement organised and executed outdoor ads, promotional clips, TV appearances, and internet ads for the Campaign and gathered 50.00 new members supporting the Movement.

=== Legal campaigns ===
RBM’s Legal Work Group which is formed by voluntary law students, lawyers and academicians is a subcommittee that aims to develop projects in the field of law.

In this context, Removing Barriers Movement works together with the Turkish Bar Association, Bars of various cities and their commissions and other relevant institutions in order to eliminate legal issues.

=== Urban Planning ===
Architecture and Infrastructure Work Group which is formed by voluntary architecture students, architectures and academicians strive to ameliorate living conditions in Turkey.

Bakırköy is chosen as the pilot area for the initial campaigns and the Group works closely with the authorities so as to create the “Disability Map of Turkey”.

== Awards ==
Year	Institution	Award
2009	The Deutsche Bank - Urban Age Award	3rd Place (Renovatio İstanbul)
2009	Junior Chamber Turkey - TOYP'09 (Ten Outstanding Young Persons)	Contribution to Human Rights, Children and World Peace – First Place (Rodin Alper Bingöl)
2010	Justice Academy of Turkey	Social Contribution Award
2010	HAYAD (Patient and Patient Relatives’ Rights Association)	Special Jury Award
2010	Galatasaray University - The Bests	Award for Best Social Responsibility Campaign
2010	Turkish Psychological Counseling and Guidance Association	Empathy Award of the Year (Rodin Alper Bingöl)
2011	ODTÜ Community of Efficiency	“You Are The Solution” Project
