= At the Bar =

- Theatrical film poster
- Directed by: Serdar Akar
- Written by: Serdar Akar
- Produced by: Serdar Akar; Güner Koralı; Alev Gezer
- Starring: Nejat İşler; Hakan Boyav; Erdal Beşikçioğlu
- Cinematography: Mehmet Aksın
- Music by: Selim Demirdelen
- Production company: Kenda Film
- Release date: February 2, 2007
- Running time: 90 minutes
- Country: Turkey
- Language: Turkish
- Box office: 1.681.728,00 ₺

At the Bar (Turkish: Barda) is a 2007 Turkish horror film, written and directed by Serdar Akar based on a real-life event that happened in Ankara, Turkey in 1997, featuring Nejat İşler as the head of a gang which brutalises, tortures, murders and rapes a group of young friends. The film, which went on general release across the country on February 2, 2007, was shown in competition at the 26th Istanbul International Film Festival and marketed as the most violent Turkish film ever made.

== Plot ==
A group of young high society friends, aged between 18 and 25, are gathered at a friend's bar that they regularly frequent for the night. But when they finish off their last beer and prepare to head home they find themselves held captive at gunpoint by five strangers. With their mouths, hands and feet tied, they are tortured, raped and murdered until the next morning. The gang who have captured them have no clear reason, they just want to punish these young people for everything left incomplete in their lives.

== Cast ==
- Burak Altay – TGG
- Doğu Alpan – Nail
- Eray Özbal – The Prosecutor
- Erdal Beşikçioğlu – Nasır the Villager
- Hakan Boyav – Osman the Pop
- Melis Birkan – Nil
- Meltem Parlak – Aynur
- Nejat İşler – Selim "The Exhaustman" Ketenci
- Nergis Öztürk – Sevgi
- Salih Bademci – Cenk
- Şamil Kafkas – Aliş
- Sarp Aydınoğlu – Barbo
- Serdar Orçin – 45
- Sezen Aray – Pelin
- Volga Sorgu – The Apprentice

== Festival screenings ==
- 14th Adana Golden Boll Film Festival
- 18th Limak Ankara International Film Festival
- 26th International Istanbul Film Festival
