= My Grandfather's People =

2011 Turkish drama film

- Directed by: Çağan Irmak
- Starring: Çetin Tekindor; Hümeyra
- Release date: 25 November 2011
- Running time: 123 minutes
- Country: Turkey
- Language: Turkish

My Grandfather's People (Turkish: Dedemin İnsanları) is a 2011 Turkish comedy-drama film directed by Çağan Irmak. It focuses on a Cretan Turk aged man who was forced to leave his home in Crete during the population exchange between Greece and Turkey, and who hopes to see his birthplace again before his death.

== Cast ==
- Çetin Tekindor - Mehmet Yavaş
- Hümeyra - Peruzat
- Zafer Algöz - Mayor
- Yiğit Özşener - İbrahim
- Gökçe Bahadır - Nurdan
- Mert Fırat - Hasan
- Ezgi Mola - Fatma
