= Bir İstanbul Masalı =

- Also known as: An Istanbul Fairytale
- Starring: Mehmet Aslantuğ; Ahu Türkpençe; Çetin Tekindor; Altan Erkekli; Arsen Gürzap; Vahide Gördüm; İsmail Hacıoğlu; Ozan Güven
- Theme music composer: Ali Tufan Kıraç - Bir İstanbul Masalı
- Country of origin: Turkey
- Original language: Turkish
- No. of seasons: 2
- No. of episodes: 71

Production
- Executive producer: Erol Avcı
- Production location: Istanbul

Original release
- Network: ATV
- Release: September 18, 2003 – June 13, 2005

Bir İstanbul Masalı is a Turkish TV series.

== Cast and characters ==
- Mehmet Aslantuğ - Selim Arhan
- Ozan Güven - Demir Arhan
- Ahu Türkpençe - Esma Kozan Arhan
- Çetin Tekindor - Ömer Arhan
- Arsen Gürzap - Behiye Arhan
- Altan Erkekli - Cemal Kozan
- Vahide Gördüm - Suzan Kozan
- Yasemin Çonka - Çiçek Kozan
- İsmail Hacıoğlu - Ozan Kozan
- Tomris İncer - Nebile Arhan
- Ergun Üglü - Teoman Arhan
- Esra Ronabar - Birnur Arhan
- Şebnem Zorlu - Hande Arhan
- Funda Şirinkal - Nazlı Yenice
- Süheyla Elbaş - Tatyana
- Ozan Şahin - Murat
- Hikmet Körmükçü - Adviye
- Julia Nitu - Maria
- Kaan Çakır - Necati
- Onuryay Evrentan - Yasemin
- Kutay Köktürk
- İbrahim İris - Erkan (şoför)
- Seda Akman - Pelin
- Metin Balay - Bahattin Goyalı
- Canan Hoşgör - Ayşegül
- Kemal Topal - Musa
- Murat Muslu - Murat
- İdil Fırat - Aylin
- Dilan Erçetin - Ayse
- Selda Özer - Sahika
- Erdem Akakçe - Dayi
- Burak Şentürk - Oguz Bey
- Ahmet Özaslan - Teoman Arhan (Ilk bölümler)
- Dolunay Soysert - Derya
- Nihat İleri - Tugrul Hoca
- Ayşe Şule Bilgiç - Zeynep
- Bahar Yanılmaz - İpek
- Zerrin Tekindor - psikolog Deniz Hanım
- Erkan Horzum
- Cemal Ustaoğlu
- Önder Açıkbaş
- Özhan Sargın
- İhsan Ustaoğlu
- Taner Ertürkler
- Filiz Hopa
- Halil İbrahim Aras
- Gamze Çopur
- İsmail Şimşek
- Mecnun Balcı
- Engin Karkın
- Müfit Aytekin
- Cüneyt Sayıl
- Gülseren Çatırlar
- Özgür Senem Gezer
- Orhan Gürses
- Orhan Ayça
- Ushan Çakır
- Murat Kalaman
- Cenan Çamyurd
- Orhan Aydın
- Özlem Saraç
- Necmettin Aras
- Volga Sorgu
- Enes Mazak
- Mehmet Akan
- Murat Özdemir
- Name Eron
- Rebi Levi
- Serhan Ernak

== Link ==
- Bir İstanbul Masalı on IMDb
