= Yetkin Dikinciler =

Turkish actor

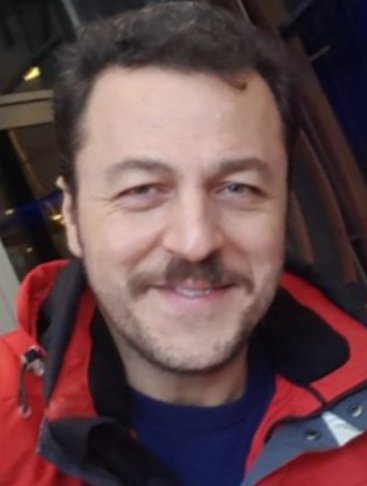
- Born: 15 August 1969 (age 56); Istanbul, Turkey
- Occupation: Actor
- Spouses: Esra Akkaya (m. 1999; div. 2000) Aslı Orcan (m. 2014)
- Children: 1

Yetkin Dikinciler (born 15 August 1969) is a Turkish actor.

== Biography ==
Yetkin Dikinciler graduated in theatre from the State Conservatory of Mimar Sinan University. He was awarded "Best Actor" for his role as Nazım Hikmet in Mavi Gözlü Dev at the 19th Ankara Film Festival, 13th ÇASOD Awards and 13th Sadri Alışık Awards.

== Filmography ==
- Hot Skull (2022)
- Barbaroslar: Akdeniz'in Kılıcı (2021) – İshak Reis
- Yeşilçam (2021) – Reha
- Menajerimi Ara (2020) – Himself
- Merhaba Güzel Vatanım (Batı İstanbul Vakfı) (2019)
- Pocket Hercules: Naim Suleymanoglu (Dijital Yapım Evi) (2019)
- Bahtiyar Ölmez (2017-2018) – Rıfat Çakar/Bahtiyar Ölmez
- Her Şey Mümkün (2017) – İbrahim/Selim
- Nadide Hayat (2015) – Kaptan Yusuf
- Kızım İçin (2013) – Tuncer
- Muhteşem Yüzyıl (2014) – Kara Ahmed Pasha
- Umut Üzümleri (Rönesans Film) (2013) – Ozan
- Merhaba Hayat (2012) – Sinan
- Çıplak Gerçek (2012)
- Bizim Yenge (2011) – Adem
- Umut Yolcuları (2010) – Mehmet Müdür
- Aile Saadeti (2009) – Selim Pasha
- Usta : Bahadır Karataş (2008) – Doğan
- Kara İnci (2007) – Semih
- Mavi Gözlü Dev : Biket İlhan – (2007) – Nâzım Hikmet
- Ulak : Çağan Irmak – (2007) – Adem
- Eşref Saati : Zeynep Günay Tan – (2007) – Sarı Eşref
- Kabuslar Evi: "Son Dans" : Çağan Irmak – (2006) – Selim
- Sis ve Gece : Turgut Yasalar – (2006) – Fahri
- Gözyaşı Çetesi : (2006) – Cevahir
- Babam ve Oğlum : Çağan Irmak – (2005) – Salim
- Misi (2005) – Onur
- Radyo Tantana (2005) – Kenan
- The Net 2.0 : (2005) – Banka Müdürü
- Kırık Kanatlar (2005) – guest appearance
- Gülizar (2004) – İsmail
- Üç Kişilik Aşk (2004) – Cem
- Avrupa Yakası : Hakan Algül – (2004) – guest appearance
- Seni Yaşatacağım : (2003) – Reşat
- Leoparın Kuyruğu : Turgut Yasalar – (1998) – Serdar
