= Mehmet Hacıoğlu =

Turkish footballer and coach

Mehmet Hacıoğlu (born 28 November 1959 in Plovdiv, Bulgaria) is a Turkish coach of Turkey national under-18 football team, Fenerbahçe PAF and former soccer player. He started his professional football managing career with Erzurumspor and also managed of Gaziosmanpaşaspor and coached of Çaykur Rizespor and Etimesgut Şekerspor. He was working for Fenerbahçe S.K. from 2004 till 2008. He also coached the football team of Sabancı University enjoying an attacking style of 3-2-3-1-2 formation with center-backs double man-marking plus a sweeper. He played at defence during his professional career. He played for Fenerbahçe (1980–84), Denizlispor (1984–86), Bakırköyspor (1986–93), Beyoğlu Kapalıçarşıspor (1993) and Gaziosmanpaşaspor (1993–94).

His son İsmail Hacıoğlu is an actor.
