= My Father and My Son =

- Turkish: Babam ve Oğlum
- Directed by: Çağan Irmak
- Written by: Çağan Irmak
- Produced by: Şükrü Avşar
- Starring: Çetin Tekindor; Fikret Kuşkan; Hümeyra; Şerif Sezer; Ege Tanman; Özge Özberk; Tuba Büyüküstün
- Cinematography: Rıdvan Ülgen
- Edited by: Kivanç Ilgüner
- Music by: Evanthia Reboutsika
- Production company: Avşar Film
- Release date: 18 November 2005
- Running time: 108 minutes
- Country: Turkey
- Language: Turkish

My Father and My Son (Turkish: Babam ve Oğlum) is a 2005 Turkish drama film written and directed by Çağan Irmak about a family torn apart by the 1980 Turkish coup d'état. The film which went on nationwide release on 18 November 2005 became one of the highest-grossing Turkish films in history.

== Plot ==
In 1980, Sadik’s wife goes into labor. They struggle to find transportation to a hospital, unaware that a coup has broken out. Exhausted, Sadik attends to his wife as she gives birth at a park, Their child, a boy named Deniz, survives, but Sadik’s wife dies from childbirth complications while Sadik is arrested and tortured for the next few months.

A few years later, Sadik, who raises Deniz with the help of his in-laws, decides to return to his native village with his son. While Sadik’s mother, Nuran, welcomes them enthusiastically, his father Hüseyin snubs them. It is later revealed that their estrangement began when Sadik abandoned his father’s dream of him managing the family farm in order to become a left-wing journalist in Istanbul and broke off his engagement with his fiancée Birgül. Hüseyin skips the welcome dinner hosted by Nuran, who introduces Deniz to his extended family, which includes Sadik’s brother Salim, Salim’s family, and Nuran’s sister, Gülbeyaz.

That night, Deniz wanders around the farmstead looking for a place to urinate. Instead he comes across Hüseyin, who forbids him from entering the barn. The next morning, Hüseyin softens up to Deniz when the latter stumbles upon a horse. An excited Hüseyin goes to town and buys up comic books for Deniz at the general store, but continues to snub Sadik. After reuniting with his friends, a drunk Sadik returns and asks Nuran to take Deniz to Salim’s place for the night. Sadik then confronts his father and reveals that he is struggling to raise Deniz. Sadik entrusts his father to give Deniz a home, but suddenly collapses.

At the hospital, Hüseyin reveals that Sadik is dying from edema acquired during his imprisonment. He reconciles with his son and arranges for him to also reconcile with a now-married Birgül. At Sadik’s funeral procession, Hüseyin expresses regret at failing to prevent his son from leaving years earlier and suffers a nervous breakdown, but Gülbeyaz brings him back to his senses by forcing Salim to ram him, saying he could not have prevented Sadik if he really wanted to leave.

A month later, Deniz has withdrawn himself from the outside world, unable to process his father’s death. On the first day of school, he suffers an emotional breakdown, prompting Hüseyin to bring him to the barn, where it is revealed to be storing home movies of the family. Deniz’ spirits are lifted when he sees the younger version of his father, and Hüseyin gives Deniz his film camera. While filming around the farm, Deniz sees a vision of Sadik, who comes to say goodbye to him one last time. Deniz films his father exiting the farm’s gate as a downpour begins. Deniz’s grandparents rush in and take Deniz to shelter.

== Awards ==
The film won an award for its soundtrack at the World Soundtrack Awards, awarded to Evanthia Reboutsika.

Kuşkan was given the Best actor award at the 25th Istanbul Film Festival for his performance in Babam ve Oğlum.

== Cast ==
- Fikret Kuşkan – Sadık
- Çetin Tekindor – Hüseyin
- Hümeyra – Nuran
- Şerif Sezer – Gülbeyaz Teyze
- Ege Tanman – Deniz
- Özge Özberk – Birgül
- Tuba Büyüküstün – Aysun
- Yetkin Dikinciler – Salim
- Binnur Kaya – Hanife
- Halit Ergenç – Özkan
- Mahmut Gökgöz – Kahya
