= Avcı =

Avcı ([ˈavdʒɯ]) is a Turkish given name and surname. Avcı or Avci may refer to:

== Surname ==
- Abdullah Avcı (born 1963), Turkish football manager
- Bengisu Avcı (born 1996), Turkish long-distance swimmer
- Erkan Avcı (born 1982), Turkish actor
- Gulan Avci (born 1977), Swedish politician
- Hilal Avcı (born 1996), Turkish female canoeist
- Koray Avcı (born 1979), Turkish footballer
- Mehmed Avci (1642–1693), Sultan of the Ottoman Empire
- Nabi Avcı (born 1953), Turkish academic and politician
- Sabit Osman Avcı (1921–2009), Turkish politician
- Sedef Avcı (born 1982), Turkish actress
- Serdar Avcı (born 1985), Turkish boxer
- Turgay Avcı (born 1959), Deputy Prime Minister and Minister of Foreign Affairs in the government of the Turkish Republic of Northern Cyprus
- Yasin Avcı (footballer born 1983), Turkish footballer
- Yasin Avcı (footballer born 1984), Turkish footballer

== Places ==
- Avcı, Kemaliye
