= Everything About Mustafa =

- Film poster
- Directed by: Çağan Irmak
- Written by: Çağan Irmak
- Produced by: Abdullah Oğuz
- Starring: Fikret Kuşkan; Nejat İşler; Başak Köklükaya; Şerif Sezer
- Cinematography: Selahattin Sancaklı
- Edited by: Özen Film
- Release date: 23 September 2003
- Country: Turkey
- Language: Turkish

Everything About Mustafa (Turkish: Mustafa Hakkında Herşey) is a 2004 Turkish drama thriller film written and directed by Çağan Irmak about a man forced to confront his past after he loses everything in an accident.

== Plot ==
Mustafa is a business man living with his family when an accident takes it from him and leaves him with questions and a cab driver who can answer it all. Mustafa is due to get a lot more than what he bargained for, however, as his interrogations take him to childhood memories and force him to see his life from a very different perspective.

== Cast ==
- Fikret Kuşkan - Mustafa
- Nejat İşler - Fikret
- Başak Köklükaya - Ceren
- Şerif Sezer - Mukadder
- Zeynep Eronat - Selda
- Borgahan Gümüşsoy - Young Mustafa
