= Aşk ve Ceza =

- Written by: Yıldız Tunç; Murat Lütfü; Mehmet Bilal; Ethem Yekta
- Directed by: Kudret Sabancı
- Starring: Nurgül Yeşilçay; Murat Yıldırım; Feride Çetin; Tomris İncer; Kerem Atabeyoğlu; Gökçe Yanardağ; Sinan Tuzcu
- Country of origin: Turkey
- Original language: Turkish
- No. of seasons: 2
- No. of episodes: 62

Production
- Running time: 90 minutes

Original release
- Network: ATV
- Release: January 5, 2010 – June 27, 2011

Aşk ve Ceza (English: Love and Punishment) is a Turkish television drama series that aired in 2010 and 2011. Nurgül Yeşilçay, Murat Yıldırım and Feride Çetin starring, the series were shot in Van, Bodrum and Istanbul. Since 2011, this series has been broadcast in more than 43 countries.

In 2011, in Bosnia and Herzegovina on FTV, Croatia on Kanal 2 and Nova TV, and Romania on Kanal D. In Serbia, it was aired from January 8, 2013, in 1PRVA. In Georgia TV Maestro started broadcasting this series on April 15, 2013, and January 17, 2014, on Slovenian channel Planet TV. And, from August 28, 2017, it is again airing by Bosnian FTV.

== Plot ==
A 29-year-old woman called Yasemin (Nurgül Yeşilçay) works at an advertising agency. She has been with her fiancé Mehmet (Caner Kurtaran) for over three years. Just a week before their wedding. Her life turns upside down as she feels deeply betrayed and unappreciated. She drops everything, and goes to Bodrum. In Van, Çiçek (Feride Çetin) is marrying Kemal Baldar (Ali Yiğit), the eldest son of the powerful Baldar family. Kemal Baldar's American educated, modern brother Savaş goes to Bodrum for a vacation after his brother's wedding. Those two have their first encounter at a bar in Bodrum. Yasemin, betrayed and devastated by the turn of events with her fiancé, finds herself in the arms of Savaş after a night of heavy drinking. Burdened with guilt and regret after her one night stand, she leaves without even learning Savaş's name. Savaş also fails to learn who the girl that stole his heart that night is. After receiving a phone call informing him that his newly married brother and his father died in a car accident, Savaş returns to Istanbul as head of his family. In the meantime, Yasemin finds out she is pregnant with Savaş's baby, and then she gives birth to a child named Ömer. While Savaş keeps dealing with his family's unconventional problems, he doesn't stop looking for Yasemin, the Cinderella.

=== Main cast ===
Actor/Actress	Character
Nurgül Yeşilçay	Yasemin Ustun Baldar; Main female protagonist
Murat Yıldırım	Savaş Baldar; Main male protagonist
Feride Çetin	Çiçek Moran Baldar
Tomris İncer	Şahnur Baldar
Zeynep Beşerler	Nadya
Caner Kurtaran	Mehmet; antagonist
Gökçe Yanardağ	Nazan Baldar Noyan
Oktay Gürsoy	Cem
Kerem Atabeyoğlu	Pala Abdulkadir
Sennur Nogaylar	Leyla Ustun
Nazan Kesal	Sevgi
Cenk Ertan	Bora Noyan; antagonist
Halil Kumova	Ahmet Moran; main antagonist of first season (Killed by Mustafa)
Erkan Bektaş	Yavuz Moran; main antagonist of second season (Killed by police)
Ali Yigit	Kemal Baldar (Killed in a car accident)
Taner Barlas	Hasip Baldar (Killed in a car accident)
Belit Özükan	Müjde
Enis Ankan	Alpay
Işil Dayioğlu	Sitare
Meltem Pamirtan	Endam
Gamze Topuz	Derya
Sinan Tuzcu	Hakan
Emrah Elçiboga	Eşref (Killed by Yavuz)
Ahu Yağtu	Pelin
Alihan Araci	Haldun
Özlem Conker	Ceyda
Nalan Yavuz	Fidan
