= Barış Falay =

Turkish actor

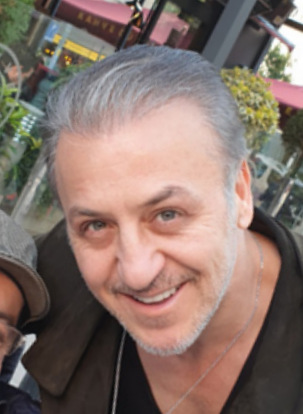
- Born: 9 April 1972 (age 53); Edremit, Turkey
- Education: Graduated in Theatre from Ankara University
- Occupation: Actor
- Years active: 1995–present
- Spouse: Esra Ronabar (m. 2006)
- Children: 1

Barış Falay (born 9 April 1972) is a Turkish actor.

== Biography ==
Barış Falay was born in Edremit, Balıkesir Province and his family is of Bosnian descent. He graduated in theatre from Ankara University. After working at the Ankara State Theatre for 2 years, he joined the İzmir City Theatre appearing in plays such as Hamlet, Üç Kuruşluk Opera, Misafir, Kamyon, Roberto Zucco, Kırmızı Yorgunları, Azizname, Barış, Bahar Noktası, Yaşar Ne Yaşar Ne Yaşamaz and Karar Kimin. He directed the plays Deniz Kızı Masalı and Bir Yaz Gecesi Rüyası, and taught at the theatre's school. Later Falay joined the Kocaeli Metropolitan Theatre.

He began his television career in sitcoms such as Tatlı Hayat, Yarım Elma and Dadı after which he played in the series Aliye. Between 2009 and 2011, he played Kerpeten Ali Kırgız in the series Ezel for which he won a number of acting awards. Falay played a lead role in the film Ya Sonra. Falay returned to television in 2011 with the series Al Yazmalım. From 2013 to 2015, he played Selim Serez on the television series Medcezir.

== Filmography ==
Television
Year	Title	Role	Notes
1995	Çiçek Taksi		
2001	Bizim Çocuklarımız		
2001	90-60-90		
2002	Tatlı Hayat	Akıl hastası	
2002	Yarım Elma		
2002	Kuzenlerim	Engin Öğretmen	
2002	Dadı	Şafak	Episode 51
2004	Karım ve Annem	Coşkun	Mini series
2004–2006	Aliye	Mücahit Gürboğa (Müco)	
2006	Bebeğim	Yavuz Köroğlu	Mini series
2008	Çemberin Dışında	Mafya	
2009	İstanbul Çocukları		
2009–2011	Ezel	Ali Kırgız (Kerpeten Ali)	
2011–2012	Al Yazmalım	Cemşit Ateş	
2013–2015	Medcezir	Selim Serez	
2015–2017	Paramparça	Harun Erguvan	
2020–2021	Menajerimi Ara	Kıraç Özdal	Leading role
2023–	Ömer	Reşat Ademoğlu	Leading role
2023	Yalı Çapkını	Reşat Ademoğlu	Guest appearance
2025	Kardelenler	Koray Gündoğan	Leading role
2025–	Kuruluş: Orhan	Şahinşah Bey	Leading role
Streaming series and films
Year	Title	Role	Notes
2023	İyi Adamın 10 Günü	Macit	Netflix film
Film
Year	Title	Role	Notes
2008	Şeytanın Pabucu	Niyazi	
2008	Kirpi	Jilet Sadi	
2011	Ya Sonra	Cem Kantoğlu	
2021	Sen Ben Lenin	Commissioner Erol	
2025	Uykucu	Kartal	
