= Wish Me Luck (film) =

2001 film

Bana şans dile
- Directed by: Çağan Irmak
- Written by: Çağan Irmak
- Produced by: İrfan Tözüm
- Cinematography: Cenap Cevahir
- Edited by: Erhan Öz
- Music by: Bora Ebeoğlu; Cengiz Onural
- Release date: 2001
- Running time: 88 minutes
- Country: Turkey
- Language: Turkish

Wish Me Luck (Turkish: Bana Şans Dile) is a 2001 Turkish action film directed by Çağan Irmak.

== Cast ==
- Mert Akça
- Nilgün Belgün
- Başak Dasman
- Remzi Evren
- İsmail Hacıoğlu
- Rıza Kocaoğlu
- Kutay Köktürk
- Aysun Metiner
- Güler Ökten
- Fuat Onan
- Oya Semerci
- Volkan Severcan
- Melisa Sözen
- Levent Sülün as Komiser Hasan
- Deniz Ugur
- Berke Üzrek
