= Mahinur Ergun =

Turkish screenwriter, film director

- Born: 1 January 1956 (age 70); Bursa, Turkey
- Occupations: screenwriter, film director
- Awards: Best Director; Medcezir Manzaraları; 3rd Film Festival Ankara 1990

Mahinur Ergun (born 1 January 1956) is a Turkish screenwriter and film director. Her first well-known television series were Şaşıfelek Çıkmazı as a director and Asmalı Konak as a screenwriter.

== Biography ==
Ergun was born on 1 January 1956 in Bursa, Bursa Province, Turkey. She graduated at the radio, television and cinema Communication Faculty of University of Ankara in 1978. Then she produced ad movies for a year.

Her first cinema movie is from 1988, Gece Dansı Tutsakları, about the love between a journalist and a dancer.

She helped in the starting of Çağan Irmak film director's career.

She was a member of the jury at the 44th Golden Orange Film Festival in 2007.

== Filmography ==
Screens
Film	Year	Directed by	Other
Merhamet	2013	Çağatay Tosun; Gül Oğuz	Season I-II.
Alev Alev	2012	Atilla Cengiz	
Yıllar Sonra	2011	Metin Balekoğlu	drama
Al Yazmalım	2011	Ali Bilgin; Nisan Akman	drama
Yapma Diyorum	2009	Abdullah Oğuz	komédia
Kış Masalı	2009	Gül Oğuz	drama
Son Bahar	2008	Nihat Durak	romantic drama
Mert İle Gert	2008	Hakan Algül	family comedy
Limon Ağacı	2008	Deniz Ergun	romantic drama
Karamel	2008	Özer Kızıltan; Şafak Bal	family drama
Sevgili Dünürüm	2007	Bora Tekay; Hakan Algül; Raşit Çelikezer	comedy
Ahh İstanbul	2006	Çağatay Tosun; Şerif Gören	romantic drama
Haziran Gecesi	2004	Andaç Haznedaroğlu	romantic adventure
Asmalı Konak	2002	Abdullah Oğuz; Çağan Irmak	romantic drama
Çatısız Kadınlar	1999	own direction	drama, psychology
Şaşıfelek Çıkmazı	1996	Çağan Irmak	romantic drama
Medcezir Manzaraları	1989	own direction	drama, psychology
Gece Dansı Tutsakları	1988	own direction	romantic adventure

Directions
Film	Year	Other
Nasıl Evde Kaldım	2001	comedy
Dedelerimi Evlendirirken	2000	comedy
Sıdıka	1997	for youths and families
Çılgın Badiler	1996	–
Kopgel Taksi	1995	family
Ay Vakti	1993	cinema movie
Yabancı Bir Sevgi	1987	romantic
