= Melis Birkan =

Turkish actress (born 1982)

- Born: 15 July 1982 (age 43); Eskişehir, Turkey
- Occupation: Actress
- Years active: 2005–present
- Spouse: Aras Aydın (m. 2022)
- Awards: 14th Sadri Alışık Awards; Best Actress; 2008 Issız Adam

Melis Birkan (born 15 July 1982) is a Turkish actress. She graduated from ballet department for elementary school, high school and modern dance department for university in State Conservatory of Mimar Sinan Fine Arts University. She is best known for theatre and films Issız Adam, Barda, Sen Ben Lenin, Ulak, Adını Sen Koy. She won Sadri Alışık Best Actress Award for Issız Adam.

She was cast in romantic comedy series in "Çapkın" alongside Okan Yalabık. With Erdal Beşikçioğlu, she was cast in "Köprü" based on life of governor Recep Yazıcıoğlu. She had guest roles in hit comedies Avrupa Yakası and İşler Güçler.

With Okan Yalabık, she played in spin off period series Bu Kalp Seni Unutur mu? of hit series Hatırla Sevgili. She played in period comedy drama series in "Deli Saraylı" with ensemble cast.

She joined as leading role in third season of hit surreal comedy Leyla ile Mecnun. She played in hit mini series 46: Yok Olan alongside Erdal Beşikçioğlu again.

With Tolga Sarıtaş, she played in mini historical series Büyük Sürgün Kafkasya about Meskhetian Turks and in third season of military series Söz which nominated International Emmy Awards.

She is married to fellow actor Aras Aydın.

== Filmography ==
Movies
Year	Title	Role	Note
2003	Delinin Rüyaları		
2006	Barda	Nil	
2007	Amerikalılar Karadeniz'de 2	Çiçek	
2007	Ulak	Emine (Ümmü)	
2008	Issız Adam	Ada	
2009	Adını Sen Koy	Aybige	
2016	Sen Benim HerŞeyimsin	Pınar	
2021	Sen Ben Lenin	İdil	
Web Series
Year	Title	Role	Note
2015	Büyük Sürgün Kafkasya	Safiye	
2016	46 Yok Olan	Ceyla	
Tv Series
Year	Title	Role	Note
2005	Çapkın	Kiraz	
2006	İyi ki Varsın	Gizem	
2006–2008	Köprü	Elmas	
2008	Ayışığı	Zeynep	
2009	Bu Kalp Seni Unutur mu?	Cemile	
2009	Avrupa Yakası		Guest
2010	Deli Saraylı	Hüma	
2012	İşler Güçler		Guest
2012–2013	Leyla ile Mecnun	Leyla	3rd season
2013	Saklı Kalan	Defne-Gülce Başar	
2019	Söz	Linda	Joined
2020	Sefirin Kızı	Canan	Joined
2020	Menajerimi Ara	Herself	Guest
2022	Kırmızı Oda	Nazgül	Guest
Theatre
Year	Title	Role	Note
2005	Mucizeler Komedisi		
2007	Komedi Dükkanı		Guest
2016	Müdür Ne'aptın?		Guest

== Award ==
- Issız Adam - Sadri Alışık Awards Best Actress Award
