= İsmail Hacıoğlu =

Turkish actor

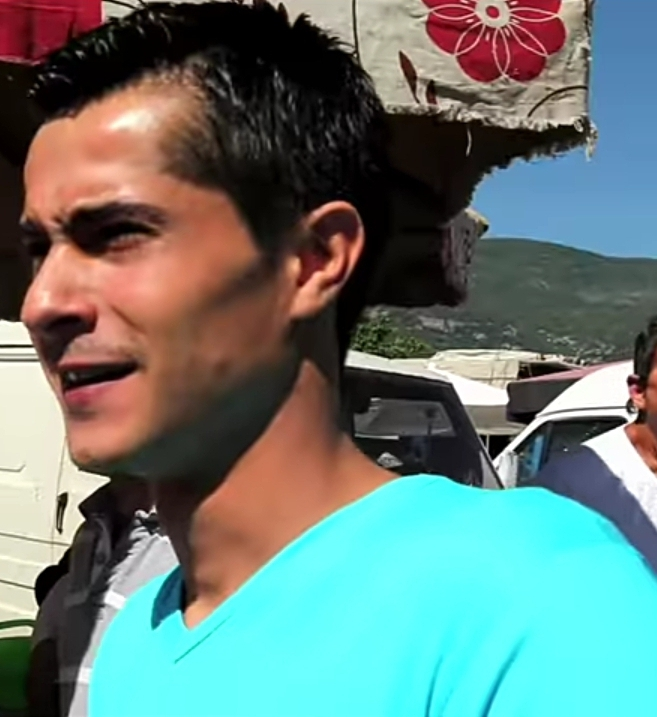
- Born: 30 November 1985 (age 40); Istanbul, Turkey
- Spouse(s): Vildan Atasever (m. 2010; div. 2015) Duygu Kumarki (m. 2016; div. 2020) (m. 2025)
- Children: 1
- Father: Mehmet Hacıoğlu

İsmail Hacıoğlu (born 30 November 1985) is a Turkish actor and son of Turkey national under-18 football team coach Mehmet Hacıoğlu and brother of actress Kardelen Hacıoğlu. Since the beginning his career, he is cited as one of the best actors of his generation.

== Career ==
His paternal family is of Turkish descent who immigrated from Bulgaria. He started acting when he got a role in a play in the fifth grade of elementary school. He studied theater at Müjdat Gezen Art Center and performed in theater productions there for two seasons. He played in the private theater of Aydoğan Tamer and Erdal Duman, and then at the Istanbul Youth Theater. While he was studying at Müjdat Gezen Art Center, he started dubbing ads. While starring in Bir Istanbul Masalı, he was admitted to the theater Department of Mimar Sinan University State Conservatory but later dropped out. He has appeared in many popular films and series. He has numerous awards and box office successes.

At the age of fifteen, he began his TV career with sequel series Günaydın İstanbul Kardeş. He played in hit youth series "Koçum Benim". He was cast in popular dramas "Bir İstanbul Masalı", "Beyaz Gelincik". He played in Sinekli Bakkal which based on classic novel. With his ex-wife Vildan Atasever, he played in Gece Sesleri based on novel.

He portrayed two roles as Mehmed II and Fatih İkinci in surreal period comedy "Osmanlı Tokadı" alongside Vildan Atasever, Pelin Akil. He appeared in period comedy "Zeyrek ile Çeyrek" which was a spin-off of Filinta. He portrayed Üsküplü Ali in historical drama "Mehmetçik Kut'ül Amare".

He played two characters in "Mahkum" which won Seoul Best Series Award.

His web series are "Hükümsüz" and "Ölüm Kime Yakışır".

== Filmography ==
Films
Year	Title	Role	Notes
2001	Bana Şans Dile	Çağlar	
2002	Hiçbiryerde	Boy	
2003	Karşılaşma	Osman	
2005	Anlat İstanbul	Fiko	
2006	Sınav	Mert	
2007	Kabadayı	Murat	
2008	Hoşçakal Güzin	Serkan	
2009	Vali	Sarp Uçar	
2009	Gökten Üç Elma Düştü	Ali	
2009	Başka Semtin Çocukları	Veysel	
2009	Sonsuz Bir An	Volkan	
2010	Çakal	Akın	
2011	Sinyora Enrica ile İtalyan Olmak	Ekin	
2011	Türkan	Police Mustafa	
2013	Meryem	Murat	
2015	Sonsuz Bir Aşk	Volkan	
2015	Kafes	Mehmet Sipahi	
2016	Mahrumlar	Kutlu	TV Film
2016	Lokman İlyas	İlyas	TV Film
2016	Kayıp İnci	Cemal	TV Film
2017	Ayla	Süleyman Dilbirliği	
2019	Cep Herkülü: Naim Süleymanoğlu	Mehmet Tunç	
2019	Şuursuz Aşk	Yusuf	
2019	Türk İşi Dondurma	Kaptan	
2022	Kesişme: İyi ki Varsın Eren	Ferhat Gedik	
2023	49	Oğuz	
Television
Year	Title	Role	Notes
2000	Günaydın İstanbul Kardeş		
2002	Koçum Benim	Ali	
2003–2005	Bir İstanbul Masalı	Ozan Kozan	
2005–2007	Beyaz Gelincik	Mehmet Ali Aslanbaş	
2007	Sinekli Bakkal	Onur	
2008–2009	Gece Sesleri	Yağız Haksever	
2008	Beni Unutma	Guest	
2011	Şüphe	Aziz Kutlu	
2011–2012	Firar	Civan	
2013–2014	Osmanlı Tokadı	Mehmed II / Fatih İkinci	
2015	Zeyrek ile Çeyrek	Meftun	
2017	Kayıtdışı	Nejat Ateş	
2018–2019	Mehmetçik Kut'ül Amare	Üsküplü Ali	
2019–2020	Çocuk	Hasan Çetin	
2020	Zümrüdüanka	Cihan Gürtuna	
2021–2022	Mahkum	Barış Yesari / Savaş Yesari	
2023	Taçsız Prenses	Evgin	
Web series
Year	Title	Role	Notes
2021	Hükümsüz	Selim	Exxen
TBA	Ölüm Kime Yakışır		TV+

== Awards ==
- 2003 – 40th Antalya Film Festival – Hopeful Young Actor for The Encounter (Karşılaşma)
- 2003 – 15th Ankara Film Festival – Mehmet Emin Toprak - Hopeful New Actor for The Encounter
- 2003 – 25th Siyad Türk Cinema Awards – Hopeful Artist of the Year for The Encounter
- 2004 – 11th ÇASOD "Best Actor" Awards – Hopeful Actor for The Encounter
- 2009 – 20th Ankara Film Festival Awards – "Best Supporting Actor" - Üç Elma Düştü
- 2011 – 16th Sadri Alışık Awards – "Best Actor of the Year" -Çakal – Erhan Kozan
