= The Secret Face =

1991 Turkish film

- Directed by: Ömer Kavur
- Cinematography: Erdal Kahraman
- Music by: Cahit Berkay
- Release date: 1991
- Running time: 118 minutes
- Language: Turkish

The Secret Face (Turkish: Gizli Yüz) is a 1991 Turkish drama film written and directed by Ömer Kavur. It was screened in competition at the 48th Venice International Film Festival.

== Cast ==
- Zuhal Olcay
- Fikret Kuşkan
- Sevda Ferdağ
- Savaş Yurttaş
