= Asmalı Konak =

- Written by: Mahinur Ergun; Meral Okay
- Directed by: Çağan Irmak
- Starring: Özcan Deniz; Nurgül Yeşilçay
- Country of origin: Turkey
- Original language: Turkish
- No. of seasons: 1
- No. of episodes: 54

Production
- Producer: Abdullah Oğuz
- Production locations: Ürgüp; Istanbul
- Running time: 90 min.
- Production company: ANS Production

Original release
- Network: ATV
- Release: 11 March 2002 – 16 June 2003

Asmalı Konak ("The Mansion with Vines") is a Turkish TV series directed by Çağan Irmak and written by Mahinur Ergun and Meral Okay. It aired on ATV for a total of 54 episodes. The series was followed by a sequel, released as a feature film titled Asmalı Konak: Hayat.

== Plot ==
The Karadağs are a wealthy family that owns vast estates in Cappadocia. Their heir Seymen goes to study in New York where he meets Bahar, the daughter of a family from İstanbul. They fall in love, get married and move to the Karadağs' ancestral home, the "Asmalı Konak".

== Cast ==
- Özcan Deniz—Seymen Karadağ
- Nurgül Yeşilçay—Bahar Karadağ
- Selda Alkor—Sümbül Karadağ
- Menderes Samancılar—Bekir Kirve
- İpek Tuzcuoğlu—Dicle
- Selda Özer—Dilara Hamzaoğlu
- Eylem Yıldız—Zeynep Karadağ
- Devrim Saltoğlu—Seyhan Karadağ
- Nihal Menzil—Fatma
- Ege Aydan—Yaman
- Kenan Bal—Ali Hamzaoğlu
- Şerif Sezer—Kader Hamzaoğlu
- Yaman Tarcan—Haydar
- Burak Altay—Salih
- Aysun Metiner—Lale
- Efsun Alper—Ayşe Melek
- Zeynep Eronat—Piraye
- Canan Hoşgör—Gül Uysal
- Murat Onuk—Can Uysal
- Erkan Atbin—Murat Uysal
- Goncagül Sunar—Hayriye
- Metin Yıldırım—Memo (Mehmet)
- Yeliz Özdemir—Asya
- Naz Temel—Zeliş (Zeliha)
- Can Kesici—Rıza
- Yonca Cevher—Duygu
- Taner Barlas—Süleyman
- Ali Başar—Tamer Hamzaoğlu
- Barış Hayta—Hakan
- Ali İpin—Kemal
- Meltem Savcı—Keriman
