= Alone (2008 film) =

- Directed by: Çağan Irmak
- Written by: Çağan Irmak
- Starring: Melis Birkan; Cemal Hünal; Yıldız Kültür; Gözde Kansu; Şerif Bozkurt; Aslı Aybars
- Release date: 7 November 2008
- Running time: 113 minutes
- Country: Turkey
- Language: Turkish

Alone (Turkish: Issız Adam) is a 2008 Turkish drama film written and directed by Çağan Irmak. The movie has received widespread interest from the Turkish media and had an outstanding performance in the box-office. The film's Turkish title Issız Adam is a triple entendre, as it can mean "Abandoned Man", "My Abandoned Island", and "My Lonely Ada", Ada being the name of the female lead character.

== Plot ==
The film follows the lives of two people who live in Istanbul who happen to meet each other in a second-hand book shop. Alper is from Tarsus. He and Ada live different lives; Alper is a free-spirited man in his thirties who is the owner and the cook of a popular restaurant whereas Ada is a humble girl in her late twenties who designs child costumes for a living. Alper follows Ada to her shop after the initial meeting but she acts coldly towards him and insists that she doesn't want a serious relationship and throws coffee on him. She later calls him to apologize and Alper asks her out once more. She is reluctant at first but agrees to have dinner at his house and they end up sleeping together. It's the beginning of a moving relationship between them. But soon things begin to go wrong. Alper feels his freedom flying away and the need to utilize prostitutes, as he did before he met Ada. He can't bear the weight of a serious relationship whereas Ada is deeply in love and unable to sense anything unusual. Despite Alper's mother's warning about never letting Ada go, Alper breaks up with her just when their relationship seemed at its best. Ada is devastated and slaps him in the face before leaving. Alper seems happy for himself and for her after the break-up but then falls into depression and feels remorse. Four years later, Alper is taking his friend's son to the cinema where he meets Ada, now married with a daughter and living in London. Their conversation is polite and they act as if they were over each other, but in their thoughts we learn that Ada secretly visited Alper's mother and found out more about his past; and that Alper sits every day in front of her shop imagining that she still works there. They share one tearful last hug before Alper leaves confused and desolate as they look at each other for the last time. Ada imagines a happy ending, an ending they deserved. The film mainly emphasises the desolation and seclusion of modern life and its consequences on the romantic relationship between Alper and Ada.

== Cast ==
- Cemal Hünal as Alper
- Melis Birkan as Ada
- Yıldız Kültür as Müzeyyen
- Şerif Bozkurt as Senol
- Gözde Kansu as Sinem
- Aslı Aybars as Yasemin
- Goncagül Sunar as Müşteri Kadın
- Veda Yurtsever as Alper'in Arkadaşı
