= Çağan Irmak =

Turkish film and television writer and director (born 1970)

- Born: 4 April 1970 (age 55); Seferihisar, İzmir, Turkey
- Occupation: Filmmaker
- Years active: 1992–present

Çağan Irmak (born 4 April 1970) is a Turkish film and television writer and director, who has managed to attract a large audience in Turkey and is best known for the TV series Çemberimde Gül Oya (2004–2005) and Asmalı Konak (2002–2004), and for the hit films Alone (2008) and My Father and My Son (2005), for which he received Turkish Cinema Writers Association Awards for Best Film, Best Screenplay and Best Director.

He studied Radio, TV and Film Studies at Ege University Faculty of Communications, receiving the Sedat Simavi Award for two short films, Masal (The Tale) and Kurban (The Sacrifice), which he made in the course of his studies. After graduating in 1992, he worked in cinema and television as an assistant director to Orhan Oğuz, Mahinur Ergun, Filiz Kaynak and Yusuf Kurçenli, and was awarded first prize by IFSAK for his short film Play Me Old and Wise (1998).

He wrote and directed the TV series Good Morning Brother Istanbul (1998–2001) on atv, and the TV film Strawberry Cake (2000) before achieving some early success with his first feature film, Wish Me Luck (2001), which Rekin Teksoy describes as "unremarkable", and collaborations with Mahinur Ergun on the hit TV series Şaşıfelek Çıkmazı (2001) for TRT, and Asmalı Konak (2002–2004) for atv, for which he received numerous awards.

A period of great success followed with popular TV series Çemberimde Gül Oya (2004–2005) on Kanal D, and hit films Everything About Mustafa (2004) and My Father and My Son (2005), which according to Rekin Teksoy "successfully exploited the melodramatic idiom and was a huge box-office success," which, "showed that popular cinema was successful in appealing to wide audiences" as well as receiving six Turkish Cinema Writers Association Awards including Best Director.

Following this he wrote and directed several installment in the TV horror film series Kabuslar Evi for FOX, and the film The Messenger before achieving another popular success with the film Alone (2008). Since then he has made the short film Düşlerimdeki Atatürk (2008), the TV series Yol Arkadaşım (2008–2009) for Star and the film In Darkness (2009). He has been productive in the last years and has produced 4 additional films: Sleeping Princess (2010), My Grandfather's People (2011), Are We OK? (2012) and Whisper If I Forget (2014).

== Filmography ==
Films & TV series
Year	Title	Credited as			Notes
Year	Title	Director	Producer	Writer	Notes
1998	Play Me Old and Wise (Turkish: Bana Old and Wise'i Cal)	Yes	Yes	Yes	Short film.
1998–2001	Good Morning Brother Istanbul (Turkish: Günaydın Istanbul Kardes)	Yes		Yes	TV series for ATV.
2000	Strawberry Cake (Turkish: Cilekli Pasta)	Yes		Yes	TV film.
2001	Wish Me Luck (Turkish: Bana Şans Dile)	Yes		Yes	Feature film debut.
2001	Şaşıfelek Çıkmazı	Yes			TV series for TRT.
2002–2004	The Mansion with Vines (Turkish: Asmalı Konak)	Yes			TV series for ATV.
2004	Everything About Mustafa (Turkish: Mustafa Hakkında Herşey)	Yes		Yes	
2004–2005	Çemberimde Gül Oya	Yes		Yes	TV series for Kanal D.
2005	My Father and My Son (Turkish: Babam ve Oğlum)	Yes		Yes	
2006	House of Nightmares (Turkish: Kabuslar Evi)	Yes		Yes	TV film series for FOX.
2007	The Messenger (Turkish: Ulak)	Yes		Yes	
2008	Alone (Turkish: Issız Adam)	Yes		Yes	
2008	Atatürk in My Dreams (Turkish: Düşlerimdeki Atatürk)	Yes		Yes	Short film.
2008–2009	My Companion (Turkish: Yol Arkadaşım)			Yes	TV series for Star TV.
2009	In Darkness (Turkish: Karanlıktakiler)	Yes		Yes	
2010	Sleeping Princess (Turkish: Prensesin Uykusu)	Yes		Yes	
2011	My Grandfather's People (Turkish: Dedemin İnsanları)	Yes		Yes	
2013	Are We OK? (Turkish: Tamam mıyız?)	Yes		Yes	
2014	Whisper If I Forget (Turkish: Unutursam Fısılda)	Yes		Yes	
2015	A Unique Life (Turkish: Nadide Hayat)	Yes		Yes	
2016	My Name is Feridun (Turkish: Benim Adım Feridun)	Yes		Yes	
2018	Gülizar	Yes			TV series for Kanal D.
2018	Children's Safety to You (Turkish: Çocuklar Sana Emanet)	Yes		Yes	
2018	Remember Us (Turkish: Bizi Hatırla)	Yes		Yes	
