= List of awards and nominations received by Beren Saat =

Beren Saat awards and nominations
Awards and nominations
Award	Wins	Nominations
Yıldız Technical University	4	4
Golden Butterfly Awards	2	2
Beykent University	2	2
Seoul International Drama Awards	0	1
Latina Turkish Awards	2	2

Totals (Note: Certain award groups do not simply award one winner. They acknowledge several different recipients, have runners-up, and have third place. Since this is a specific recognition and is different from losing an award, runner-up mentions are considered wins in this award tally. For simplification and to avoid errors, each award in this list has been presumed to have had a prior nomination.)
- Wins: 40
- Nominations: 47

Beren Saat is a Turkish actress known for her work predominantly in television and films. Saat is considered one of turkey's highest-paid actresses. She is the recipient of 40 accolades into her credit. Saat has received Yıldız Technical University and Golden Butterfly Awards for her performances in Aşk-ı Memnu and Yıldız Technical University Best Actress for Fatmagül'ün Suçu Ne?, and a nomination at the İsmail Cem Television Awards and Antalya Television Awards for Best Drama Actress for her intriguing performances.

She has received Seoul International Drama Awards and Kadir Has University for Best Actress in a Drama Series for highly acclaimed Fatmagül'ün Suçu Ne?. Apart from acting saat has been honoured as The Most Successful Actress at the Istanbul Technical University and Woman of the Year at the Turkey GQ Awards. She has also won Yıldız Technical University for Best Cinema Actress for Benim Dünyam. Saat received Best Actress in a Historical Series at Ege University Social Media Awards for Muhteşem Yüzyıl: Kösem.

National Solidarity Platform honoured her with the National Posture Honorary Award and 18th Yıldız Technical University Honorary award for Netflix thriller series Atiye (2020).

== Awards and nominations ==
Year	Award	Category	Work	Result
2008	Golden Tulip Fine Arts Award	Best Actress	Hatırla Sevgili	Won
2009	Kabataş Graduates Association	Best Actress	Güz Sancısı	Won
2009	Yıldız Technical University	Best Actress	Aşk-ı Memnu	Won
2009	Golden Butterfly Awards	Best Actress	Aşk-ı Memnu	Won
2009	Beykent University	Best Actress	Aşk-ı Memnu	Won
2010	Cinema is Here Festival	Young Actress	Gecenin Kanatları	Won
2010	Turkey Elle Style Awards	Stylish Actress		Won
2010	AyaklıGazete.com Awards	Best Actress in a Drama Series	Aşk-ı Memnu	Won
2010	Golden Butterfly Awards	Best Actress	Aşk-ı Memnu	Won
2010	Turkey Talk Magazine	Best Actress	Aşk-ı Memnu	Won
2010	Kadir Has University	Best Actress	Aşk-ı Memnu	Won
2010	Galatasaray University	Best Actress	Aşk-ı Memnu	Won
2010	Marmara University	Best Actress	Aşk-ı Memnu	Won
2010	İsmail Cem Television Awards	Best Drama Actress	Aşk-ı Memnu	Nominated
2010	Antalya Television Awards	Best Drama Actress	Aşk-ı Memnu	Nominated
2011	Yıldız Technical University	Best Actress	Fatmagül'ün Suçu Ne?	Won
2011	Doğuş University	Best Actress	Fatmagül'ün Suçu Ne?	Won
2011	Association of Advertising Agencies	Best Actress	Fatmagül'ün Suçu Ne?	Won
2011	2nd Quality Magazine Awards	Best Actress	Fatmagül'ün Suçu Ne?	Won
2011	Esenler Municipality	Best Actress	Fatmagül'ün Suçu Ne?	Won
2011	Dumlupınar University	Best Actress	Fatmagül'ün Suçu Ne?	Won
2011	Antalya Television Awards	Best Drama Actress	Fatmagül'ün Suçu Ne?	Nominated
2012	7th Seoul International Drama Awards	Best Actress	Fatmagül'ün Suçu Ne?	Nominated
2012	Kadir Has University	Best Actress	Fatmagül'ün Suçu Ne?	Won
2012	AyaklıGazete.com Awards	Best Actress in a Drama Series	Fatmagül'ün Suçu Ne?	Won
2012	11. ROTABEST Awards	Best Actress	Fatmagül'ün Suçu Ne?	Won
2012	25th International Consumer Summit	Best Actress	Fatmagül'ün Suçu Ne?	Won
2012	Şişli Vocational School	Best Actress	Fatmagül'ün Suçu Ne?	Won
2012	Haydarpaşa High School	Top Actress	Fatmagül'ün Suçu Ne?	Won
2013	Bilkent University	Best Actress	Fatmagül'ün Suçu Ne?	Won
2013	TUROB	Thanking Award	Aşk-ı Memnu	Won
2013	Turkey GQ Awards	Woman of the Year		Won
2014	Milliyet Art Magazine	Best Actress	Benim Dünyam	Won
2014	Yıldız Technical University	Best Cinema Actress	Benim Dünyam	Won
2014	Istanbul Technical University	The Most Successful Actress	Benim Dünyam	Won
2014	Premio APES	Best International Actress	Fatmagül'ün Suçu Ne? & Aşk-ı Memnu	Won
2014	AyaklıGazete.com Award	Best Actress in a Drama Series	İntikam	Nominated
2015	Haliç University	Best Commercial	Arçelik	Won
2015	Elele Avon Women Awards	Social Responsibility		Nominated
2016	AyaklıGazete.com Awards	Best Actress in a Historical Series	Muhteşem Yüzyıl: Kösem	Nominated
2016	Ege University Social Media Awards	Best Actress	Muhteşem Yüzyıl: Kösem	Nominated
2016	Moon Life Awards	Best Actress	Muhteşem Yüzyıl: Kösem	Nominated
2016	16th Murex d'Or Awards	Best Foreign Actress	Muhteşem Yüzyıl: Kösem	Won
2017	National Solidarity Platform	National Posture Honorary Award		Won
2017	Latina Turkish Awards	Best Actress	Aşk-ı Memnu	Won
2017	Latina Turkish Awards	Sexiest Actress	Aşk-ı Memnu	Won
2020	18th Yıldız Technical University Awards	Honorary award	Atiye	Won
