= Beren Saat =

Turkish actress (born 1984)

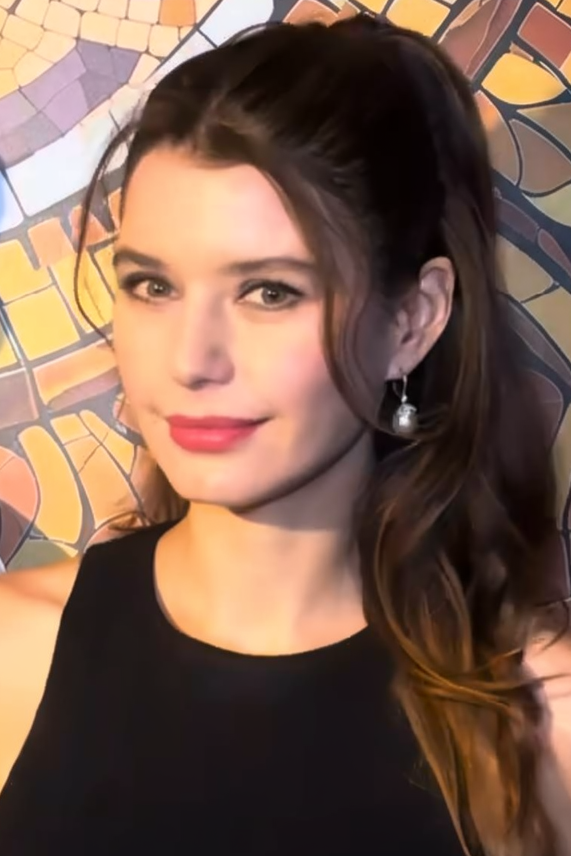
- Saat in 2024
- Born: 26 February 1984 (age 42); Ankara, Turkey
- Education: TED Ankara College Foundation Schools; Başkent University (dropped out)
- Occupations: Actress, Singer
- Years active: 2004–present
- Spouse: Kenan Doğulu (m. 2014)
- Awards: Full list
- Website: berensaat.com.tr

Beren Saat (Turkish pronunciation: [beˈɾæn saˈat]; born 26 February 1984) is a Turkish actress and singer. Since the beginning of her career, she has received critical acclaim and numerous accolades for her acting. While studying at Başkent University, she participated in the acting competition Türkiye'nin Yıldızları and was discovered by Turkish director Tomris Giritlioğlu, launching her professional acting career.

Beren Saat made her acting debut playing a minor role in the television series Aşkımızda Ölüm Var (2004). She was then prepared by Tomris Giritlioğlu for her first major role in Aşka Sürgün (2005–2006). She starred as a feisty tomboy named Yasemin Ünsal in the ATV's political series Hatırla Sevgili (2006–2008) and came to international attention for her role as Bihter Yöreoğlu Ziyagil, an unfaithful wife, in the Kanal D's romantic series Aşk-ı Memnu (2008–2010), for which she received critical acclaim and won numerous accolades, including two Golden Butterfly Awards. Her other major roles in television include a rape victim, Fatmagül Ketenci Ilgaz, in the social drama Fatmagül'ün Suçu Ne? (2010–2012), and an avenger named Derin Çelik/Yağmur Özden in the drama series İntikam (2013–2014), a remake of the American television series Revenge. Her film career began with the drama film Güz Sancısı (2009), and continued with Gecenin Kanatları (2009), Rhino Season (2012) and Benim Dünyam (2013). From 2015 to 2016, she starred as the titular character in the historical drama series Muhteşem Yüzyıl: Kösem, for which she was said to be receiving ₺90,000 per episode. Between 2019 and 2021, Saat had the leading role on the Netflix original series The Gift. In February 2026, Saat made her musical debut with the release of "CapitaliZoo".

Saat was the highest-paid actress in Turkey from 2008 to 2014. She has participated in several movies as a voice actor. She was named Actress of the Year in the "2010 Damgasını Vuranlar" list published by Radikal newspaper. In addition to her acting career, Saat is noted for her charitable efforts. She has been married to singer Kenan Doğulu since 2014.

== Early life ==
Beren Saat was born on 26 February 1984 in Ankara, to Ayla Saat (née Dikmen) and Hüseyin Avni Saat, both graduates of sports academy. She has a brother, Cem Saat. Raised in Ankara, she primarily studied at TED Ankara College Foundation Private High School and briefly attended Başkent University's Faculty of Economic and Administrative Sciences before pursuing a career in acting. With the support of her college friends, she applied to an acting competition called Türkiye'nin Yıldızları in which she became the first runner-up. After that, she appeared on TV commercials of Tofita directed by Sinan Çetin. She was discovered by the renowned director Tomris Giritlioğlu and debuted in her first series Aşkımızda Ölüm Var.

== Career ==
=== 2004–08: Hatırla Sevgili and Aşk-ı Memnu ===
In 2004, she was cast as Nermin in the TV series Aşkımızda Ölüm Var, directed by Nazif Tunç and Ümit Efekan. Her character was the sister of Ece Uslu's character in the series. In 2005, she starred as the female lead Zilan Şahvar Azizoğlu in Aşka Sürgün which was produced by Tomris Giritlioğlu and directed by Cemal Şan. Her co-star in this series was Mahsun Kırmızıgül. In 2006, she was cast as Yasemin Ünsal in the popular series Hatırla Sevgili directed by Faruk Teber and Ümmü Burha. She shared the leading role with Cansel Elçin and Okan Yalabık. The series focused on the political events occurred during 1950–70 and Saat achieved great success and nationwide fame during the period of its broadcast. Saat's friend and co-star Cansel Elçin gave an interview in which he described Beren Saat as a "super artist of high quality". In 2007, Saat appeared as a guest actress on episode 121 of the series Avrupa Yakası.

Later in 2008, she was cast in a leading role as Bihter Yöreoğlu Ziyagil in Aşk-ı Memnu (Forbidden Love), a romantic drama series which was adapted from author Halid Ziya Uşaklıgil's novel of the same name. The series was directed by Hilal Saral. Saat shared the leading role with Kıvanç Tatlıtuğ, Selçuk Yöntem and Nebahat Çehre. The story is about a girl, Bihter Yöreoğlu Ziyagil, who falls in a forbidden love with her husband's young nephew, Behlül (portrayed by Kıvanç Tatlıtuğ). Aşk-ı Memnu received positive response from the audience and was the most watched TV series in the history of Turkish television productions. Three out of every four people in Turkey watched the final episode titled "Veda". Beren Saat received critical acclaim by the critics for her performance in the final episode and the suicide scene of Bihter broke viewing records. Turkish film actress Selda Alkor commented on the final performance of Saat saying: "I congratulate Beren Saat. She really played great. She portrayed the character's psychology so great that I believe she'll become one of the most important actresses of the industry like one of us". The series became one of the most common complaints during its broadcast and some of these complaints were issued by RTÜK from time to time and were rebuffed by some ministers. After the show was broadcast around the world, Saat rose to international prominence specially in the Middle East and Europe. On 24 June 2010, the final episode aired which featured Bihter's death and the following year on the character's death anniversary people shared messages mourning her decease. The series also reached great popularity in Egypt and a TV channel made a documentary about Beren Saat's life. Hamdi Alkan, a member of Türkiye'nin Yıldızları jury was interviewed and detailed information about Beren Saat. At the end of 2010, Media Monitoring Center after a research announced that Saat has been one of the most popular TV series actors and the most talked actress of the year. She was named as Actress of the Year in the "2010 Damgasını Vuranlar" list published by Radikal newspaper.

In an interview, she stated that "I've learned a lot from what the writers wrote about the mentality of Bihter". For her role in the series, she won two Golden Butterfly Awards, and was the first nominee to win the award for two consecutive years. After the series' conclusion, the scenario was sold to Italy in 2010 and to the United States in 2012 for making adaptations in these two countries.

=== 2009–12: Cinema movies and Fatmagül'ün Suçu Ne? ===
Güz Sancısı (Pains of Autumn) was her first feature film experience, a period film directed by Tomris Giritlioğlu. Co-starred with Murat Yıldırım, Okan Yalabık and Belçim Bilgin, Saat portrayed the Greek prostitute Elena. In 2009, she also acted in Serdar Akar's film Gecenin Kanatları (Wings of the Night), written by Mahsun Kırmızıgül. She shared the lead role with Murat Ünalmış, Erkan Petekkaya and Yavuz Bingöl. She played the character Gece. There was a long discussion over a sex scene involving Saat and her co-star Murat Ünalmış on whether to show it or not and later the images of this scene was shown in the film's trailer which resulted in Saat's extreme backlash. She didn't attend the film's premiere and later sued the producer. In 2013, she withdrew the case against the producer. In 2010, she dubbed the voice of Barbie in the Turkish version of high-grossing animation Toy Story 3. In the summer of 2010, she became the face of the chips brand Patos for which she participated in numerous commercials and advertisements. Thereafter, the sales of Patos chips increased by 45% . In the same year, Saat became the face of advertisements for Rexona.

In 2010, Saat acted in the series Fatmagül'ün Suçu Ne? a screenplay adaptation of the movie written by Vedat Türkali in 1986. The series was directed by Hilal Saral and written by Ece Yörenç and Melek Gençoğlu. Her role Fatmagül Ketenci Ilgaz portrayed a victim of rape. Saat's principal partner in this series was her friend from Türkiye'nin Yıldızları competition, Engin Akyürek. The other main actors were Sumru Yavrucuk, Musa Uzunlar, Serdar Gökhan and Deniz Türkali. One of the most discussed scenes in this series was the dramatic rape scene in the first episode which broke the rating records. The series was well received by the audience and was among the top-rated series of the recent years. Saat received psychological support for this role together with some friends before playing the rape scene. The series was later contained among the items of the parliament's agenda because of its sexual scenes and a campaign was launched to stop the series' broadcast. A written statement was issued by several deputies of the Bundesrat of Germany supporting the series because of its emphasis on women's rights. After the series was broadcast in numerous countries around the world, Saat's face began to appear on the covers of magazines in different countries. After her portrayal of Fatmagül, a website published a video game on internet and converted her into one of its characters. During the game Saat could get dresses from a wardrobe that contained items such as clothes, shoes, wigs, etc. It was one of the most played games at the time of its publication. For her role in this series she was nominated for an Antalya Television Award in the Best Drama Series Actress category.

In 2012, Saat acted in her third film Rhino Season directed by the Iranian director Bahman Ghobadi. She was cast as Monica Bellucci's daughter Buse. Yılmaz Erdoğan, Caner Cindoruk and Belçim Bilgin were among the Turkish actors and Behrouz Vossoughi and Arash were among the Iranian actors that starred in this movie. The world premiere of the film was held at the Toronto International Film Festival. In September of the same year, the animation Brave was released in Turkey. Saat dubbed the voice of Merida in the film's Turkish version.

=== 2013–2016: İntikam, Benim Dünyam and Muhteşem Yüzyıl: Kösem ===
At the end of 2012, Saat began filming the series İntikam which is based on the original American series Revenge. She continued her TV career after six months of absence with İntikam. She took private lessons to improve her fighting ability for the role. The starring cast included Mert Fırat, Yiğit Özşener, Zafer Algöz, Arzu Gamze Kılınç and Engin Hepileri. The show premiered in January 2013 and Saat portrayed the character Derin Çelik/Yağmur Özden. Her dressing style was one of the most talked topics beside her acting performance. In the summer of 2013, Saat took the leading role in the movie Benim Dünyam, an adaptation from 2005 Indian movie Black. Saat shared the leading role with Uğur Yücel and played the character Ela Bayındır. Other co-stars included Ayça Bingöl, Turgay Kantürk and Hazar Ergüçlü as well as the child actress Melis Mutluç. She portrayed a blind, deaf and dumb character. After her role in this film, an American website named Beren Saat as one of the "stars" in the world and said the characters that were shown in the adapted movie were portrayed better than the original one. Also in 2013, she became the face of "Duru Perfume Duş Jeli" brand and was featured in an advertising film that took two days to shoot.

In 2014, it was announced that Muhteşem Yüzyıl: Kösem would begin in September 2015 and Saat was among the candidates to portray the leading role Kösem Sultan. The other actresses that were supposed to take the leading role included Bergüzar Korel, Tuba Büyüküstün and Hazal Kaya. The show's producer Timur Savcı refuted these allegations and said that the person who was chosen to portray Kösem Sultan would remain unrecognized. But in June 2015, it was announced that Saat would portray Kösem Sultan in this new TV series. She entered the series from episode 7 and left it after finishing season 1. Her co-stars included Hülya Avşar, Mete Horozoğlu and Erkan Kolçak Köstendil. In July 2015, together with her husband, she appeared in an advertising film for Arçelik. The advertisement begins with an action scene by Saat, while Doğulu is singing a song at the same time. The commercial also shows her while she's on a film set receiving an award in an event and in her home with Kenan Doğulu. In July 2015, she dubbed the voice of Scarlet Overkill in the Turkish version of Minions. In September 2015, the film was released in Turkey and Kenan Doğulu also dubbed the voice of Scarlet Overkill's inventor husband, Herb Overkill.

=== 2019–present: The Gift and Newly founded singing career ===
Between 2019 and 2021, Saat starred in the Netflix original series The Gift, in which she portrayed the lead role Atiye, an artist who comes across universal secrets in Anatolia. It premiered on 27 December 2019. The series was included on BBC's list of 10 most recommended series for December 2019. Writing for Hürriyet, Onur Baştürk mentioned that there was "no trace of the childishness or disharmony" that he had seen in The Protector, and praised the performance of all the actors, including Saat and her co-star Mehmet Günsür. The love scenes in the TV series became subject of discussion on social media and drew mixed reactions. Its second season was released in September 2020, followed by a third and final season in June 2021. Beren Saat's song 'CapitaliZoo,' which she and her husband Kenan Doğulu have been working on for a long time and whose production is now complete, has been released on all digital platforms in 2026. The lyrics of the English song were written by Beren Saat, while the production and arrangement were handled by her husband Kenan Doğulu. The mixing was done by Grammy Award-winning Brendan Morawski. Beren Saat's performance in the music video, filmed in Los Angeles, also drew attention. The song got mixed to negative reception from listeners.

== Personal life ==
Beren Saat began dating Kenan Doğulu in February 2012. Saat and Doğulu became engaged on 23 February 2014 in Istanbul and were married on 29 July 2014 in a private ceremony in Los Angeles, California in the United States.

== Philanthropy ==
Saat has participated in many social projects. In 2011, she became the face of deodorant brand Rexona and donated all ₺100.000 that she had earned to "Mor Çatı", a women's shelter foundation. In 2012, she designed some T-shirts for Elle magazine with her face on their covers and most of the money that was earned from selling the T-shirts in NetWork stores was donated to Nar Taneleri Projesi ("Pomegranate Seeds Project"), a charity which educates young orphan girls aged between 18 and 24. In December of the same year, she appeared on a calendar that was made and designed by Trendus.com, with a girl suffering from leukemia with Snow White costume on its cover. The Money that was earned by selling these calendars was donated to "Health and Education Foundation for Children with Leukemia". Saat, later went in front of the camera for a video supporting a project organized by European Union and Afghanistan's Ministry of Health for women's healthy childbirth in Afghanistan.

In September 2014, Saat vocalized in "Baba Beni Okula Gönder" (Daddy Send Me to School) campaign's advertising film directed by Ozan Açıktan. In the "Breast Cancer Awareness Month" in October 2014, she appeared in Abdi İpekçi Arena and performed a symbolic jump ball with a pink ball during EuroLeague basketball competition. In the same month, Saat along with many other celebrities participated in "Gençliğe Hitabe" program for addressing young people with hearing disabilities using sign language. She was also one of the first people who reacted to the murder of Özgecan Aslan by publishing messages in her social media accounts. The messages contained information about her own experiences of challenges and difficulties of women in Turkey. Saat has voiced her support for the Black Lives Matter movement and expressed solidarity with Palestine during the Gaza war.

== Filmography ==
Film
Year	Original Title	English Title	Role	Director(s)	Notes
2009	Güz Sancısı	Pains of Autumn	Elena	Tomris Giritlioğlu	Main role
2009	Gecenin Kanatları	Wings of the Night	Gece	Serdar Akar	Main role
2012	Gergedan Mevsimi	Rhino Season	Buse	Bahman Ghobadi	Main role
2013	Benim Dünyam	My World	Ela	Uğur Yücel	Main role
2023	İstanbul İçin Son Çağrı	Last Call for Istanbul	Serin	Gönenç Uyanık	Main role
Web Series
Year	Original Title	English Title	Role	Network	Notes
2019–2021	Atiye	The Gift	Atiye Özgürsoy	Netflix	Main role
Tv Series
Year	Original Title	English Title	Role	Network	Notes
2004	Aşımızda Ölüm Var	There Is Death in Our Love	Nermin	Show TV	Supporting role
2005–2006	Aşka Sürgün	Love in Exile	Zilan Şahvar Azizoğlu	ATV	Main role
2006–2008	Hatırla Sevgili	Remember Darling	Yasemin Ünsal	ATV	Main role
2007	Avrupa Yakası	European Side	Herself	ATV	Special guest appearance
2008–2010	Aşk-ı Memnu	Forbidden Love	Bihter Yöreoğlu Ziyagil	Kanal D	Main role
2010–2012	Fatmagül'ün Suçu Ne?	What Is Fatmagül's Fault?	Fatmagül Ketenci Ilgaz	Kanal D	Main role
2013–2014	İntikam	Revenge	Derin Çelik/Yağmur Özden	Kanal D	Main role
2015–2016	Muhteşem Yüzyıl: Kösem	Magnificent Century: Kösem	Kösem Sultan	Star TV	Main role
Dubbing
Year	Original Title	English Title	Role	Director(s)	Notes
2010	Oyuncak Hikayesi 3	Toy Story 3	Barbie	Lee Unkrich	Main (Turkish dubbing voice)
2012	Cesur	Brave	Merida	Mark Andrews; Brenda Chapman	Main (Turkish dubbing voice)
2015	Minyonlar	Minions	Scarlet Overkill	Kyle Balda; Pierre Coffin	Main (Turkish dubbing voice)
2020	Night on Earth	Night on Earth	Narrator		Main (Turkish dubbing voice)

Brand endorsement
Year	Brand	Director(s)	Notes
2004–2005	Tofita	Tomris Giritlioğlu	
2010–2011	Patos	Eric Heimbold	
2010–2011	Rexona	Marco Pinesi	
2013–2014	Duru		
2015–2016	Arçelik	Marco Pinesi	
2021–2023	BMW		

== Discography ==
=== Extended plays ===
Title	Notes
Exuberance	Released: June 18, 2026; Format: Digital download, streaming; Label: Dola Music

=== Singles ===
Title	Year	Album
"CapitaliZoo"	2026	Exuberance
"Honey Bee"	2026	Exuberance
