= Meryem Uzerli =

German-Turkish actress (born 1983)

- Born: Meryem Sarah Uzerli; 12 August 1982 (age 44); Kassel, West Germany
- Citizenship: Germany; Turkey
- Occupation: Actress
- Years active: 2008–present
- Notable work: Hürrem Sultan in Muhteşem Yüzyıl
- Children: 2
- Awards: Golden Butterfly Awards; Chelsea Film Festival
- Website: meryem.me

Meryem Sarah Uzerli (Turkish pronunciation: [mæɾˈjæm uzæɾˈli]; born 12 August 1982) is a German Turkish actress best known for her starring role as Hürrem Sultan in Muhteşem Yüzyıl (2011–2013), Kovan (2018) and RU (2024). She is the recipient of two Golden Butterfly Awards.

== Early life ==
Uzerli was born on 12 August 1982, to Hüseyin, from Turkey and Ursula from Germany. Her mother was head of a university examination office. Her father was a lecturer in social pedagogy. Meryem grew up in Kassel and attended a Waldorf school. She has two older brothers and an older sister, Canan, who is a jazz musician. Her maternal great-grandmother was a Croat. Due to her father's nationality, she has both Turkish-German citizenship.

== Career ==
=== 2011–13: Muhteşem Yüzyıl ===
She made her acting debut with minor parts in German productions. She later made minor appearances in the television series Notruf Hafenkante (2010) and Ein Fall für zwei (2010). Uzerli is also known for her roles in German films like Journey of No Return (2010) and Jetzt aber Ballett (2010). At the end of 2010, she was chosen by Meral Okay for her first leading role in the Turkish TV series Muhteşem Yüzyıl (2011–2013).

Uzerli's most known breakout role is as Hürrem Sultan in the historical television drama series Muhteşem Yüzyıl, directed by the Taylan Brothers. In 2010, after an eight-month search to find the best actress for this role, she was chosen by Meral Okay, the series' screenwriter, and Timur Savcı, the series' producer. About her selection, she said: "Until one day the phone rang, I was invited for a casting in Turkey, and then immediately I started living in Istanbul almost full time." She lived in a hotel for two years during the shooting of Muhteşem Yüzyıl. She shared the leading role with Halit Ergenç, Okan Yalabık and Nebahat Çehre. She won the Golden Butterfly Award for Best Actress for this part in 2012. In 2013, she left the series due to health concerns, reportedly a burnout. From episode 103 and onwards, Vahide Perçin was cast in to play an older version of Hürrem.

=== 2014–present: Gecenin Kraliçesi and Annemin Yarası ===
At the end of 2014, Uzerli signed a contract with O3, the Turkish production company of MBC Group. As of December 2014, she was still living in Berlin, but planning to move to Istanbul. In December 2014, Star TV released a video and a photo of Uzerli introducing her as one of its stars in 2015. In October 2015, she was again introduced among the TV's stars for 2016. About her future, she says: "I am trying to build on my international success within any industry where actors are respected as artists, and where I can find great scripts that allow me to delve into a story that leaves the here and now behind." In March 2015, it was finalized that Uzerli would share the leading role with Murat Yıldırım in her new TV series. The series' name was later announced as Gecenin Kraliçesi. It is directed by Muhteşem Yüzyıl directors, the Taylan Brothers. Some of the scenes for this series were filmed in Cannes, France. The shooting later continued in Rize, Turkey. It premiered on Star TV in January 2016.

In addition to her career in television, Uzerli also appeared in a cinema movie in 2016, titled Annemin Yarası. The film was released in March 2016. Her co-stars include Ozan Güven, Okan Yalabık, and Belçim Bilgin. Between 2016 and 2017, she appeared in a guest role on Eşkiya Dünyaya Hükümdar Olmaz. In 2017, she continued her movie career by appearing in Cingöz Recai opposite Kenan İmirzalıoğlu, although the film was not a box office success. Later in the same year, she shared the leading role with Özcan Deniz and Aslı Enver in the movie Öteki Taraf. In 2019, Uzerli auditioned for a role in the third season of the Netflix original series Dark. She also appeared as the lead role in the movie Kovan, the proceeds of which were donated to Haluk Levent's Ahbap foundation. In 2024 she starred in the show RU playing the character of Reyan. The series was broadcast on the Turkish digital platform GAİN. In October 2024 the series was renewed for a second season. In 2025, she was a guest star in the first season of a Turkish network show Sakir Pasa Ailesi: Mucizeler ve Skandallar.

As a model, she is the face of Blue Diamond, Maison Novague and Morlin Bron eyewear. She was also the face of Russian brand Faberlic and Trendyol Arabia. In 2025, she starred in a limited series called Antalya Gambit which premiered on YouTube and was used as a promotional material for Türkiye's global tourism brand Go Türkiye.

== Personal life ==
On 10 February 2014, she gave birth to a girl, Lara Jemima. A second daughter, Lily, was born on 8 January 2021.

== Filmography ==
Film
Year	Title	Role	Notes
2008	Menage A Trois	Madeline	Short film
2008	Jetzt vorbei		
2009	Das total verrückte Wochenende	Prostitute	
2009	Wiedergeburt		Short film
2009	The Line	Anna	Short film
2009	Schulterblick		Short film
2009	Lauf um deine Liebe		Short film
2009	LUME		Short film
2009	Sterne über dem Eis	Student	
2010	Journey of No Return	Stewardess	
2010	Das ist ja das Leben selbst		
2010	The Dark Chest of Wonders		Short film
2010	Urbane Dater		Short film
2010	Lover's Guide	Mara	Short film
2016	Annemin Yarası	Marija	Main role
2017	Cingöz Recai	Göze	Main role
2017	Öteki Taraf	Sarah	Main role
2018	Kovan	Ayşe	Main role
2024	Güzel Bir Rüya	Meryem	Main role
2027	Kürk Mantolu Madonna	Maria Puder	
Television
Year	Title	Role	Notes
2008	Ein total verrücktes Wochenende		
2008	Inga Lindström: Hannas Fest	Britta	Protagonist
2009	Hayat		Trailer
2010	Der Staatsanwalt		Episode: "Mordswut"
2010	Notruf Hafenkante		Episode: "Alles Lüge"
2010	Ein Fall für zwei	Ankel	Episode: "Verlust"
2010	Jetzt aber Ballett	Sasha Kitano	TV movie
2010	WALF: We All Love Football	Lena	TV series
2011–2013	Muhteşem Yüzyıl	Hürrem Sultan	Main role
2016	Gecenin Kraliçesi	Selin	Main role
2016–2017	Eşkiya Dünyaya Hükümdar Olmaz	Suzi	Supporting role
2024	RU	Reyan	Main role
2024–2025	Sakir Pasa Ailesi: Mucizeler ve Skandallar	Rozali	Supporting role

== Awards and nominations ==
Year	Award	Category	Nominee	Result
2010	47th International Antalya Golden Orange Film Festival	Special Jury Prize	Journey of No Return	Won
2011	24th Tüketici Academy Award	Best Female Lead	Muhteşem Yüzyıl	Won
2011	Silver Horse Award	Best Actress	Muhteşem Yüzyıl	Won
2011	TV Stars Award	Best Actress	Muhteşem Yüzyıl	Won
2011	38th Golden Butterfly Award	Special Prize	Muhteşem Yüzyıl	Won
2011	Marmara University	Best Actress	Muhteşem Yüzyıl	Won
2011	TV Oscars	Best Actress	Muhteşem Yüzyıl	Won
2011	2nd AyakliGazete.com Awards	Best Actress	Muhteşem Yüzyıl	Won
2011	Turkish Antalya Television Award	Best Drama Actress	Muhteşem Yüzyıl	Nominated
2012	Turkey GQ Awards	Woman of the Year		Won
2012	39th Golden Butterfly Award	Best Actress	Muhteşem Yüzyıl	Won
2012	Galatasaray University	Best Film and Serial Actress	Muhteşem Yüzyıl	Won
2012	Istanbul Kültür University	Best Drama Series Actress	Muhteşem Yüzyıl	Won
2012	Golden MDG Award	Best Drama Lead Turkey	Muhteşem Yüzyıl	Won
2012	Magazinci.com Honorary Awards	Best Actress	Muhteşem Yüzyıl	Won
2012	Magazine Journalists Association: Golden Objective Awards	Best Actress of the Year	Muhteşem Yüzyıl	Won
2012	Yıldız Technical University	Most Popular Series Actress	Muhteşem Yüzyıl	Won
2012	3rd AyakliGazete.com Awards	Best Actress	Muhteşem Yüzyıl	Nominated
2012	Turkish Antalya Television Award	Best Drama Actress	Muhteşem Yüzyıl	Nominated
2012	Aydın University Istanbul	Most Popular Series Actress	Muhteşem Yüzyıl	Won
2012	Radikal Awards	Best Actress	Muhteşem Yüzyıl	Won
2012	Andy-Ar Awards	Best Actress of the Year	Muhteşem Yüzyıl	Won
2012	Esenler 2012 Most Successful People Names	Best Actress of the Year	Muhteşem Yüzyıl	Won
2013	11th Stars Award Ceremony	Most admired TV series Actress of 2012	Muhteşem Yüzyıl	Won
2013	20th İtü Emös Achievement Awards	Best Actress	Muhteşem Yüzyıl	Won
2013	Turkish Antalya Television Award	Best Drama Actress	Muhteşem Yüzyıl	Won
2013	Yıldız Technical University	Most Popular Series Actress	Muhteşem Yüzyıl	Won
2013	4th AyakliGazete.com Awards	Best Actress	Muhteşem Yüzyıl	Won
2013	Crystal Mouse Awards	Best Actress	Muhteşem Yüzyıl	Won
2016	7th Beirut International Awards Festival	Best International Actress	Eşkıya Dünyaya Hükümdar Olmaz	Won
2020	Cana Dorada Film Festival	Best International Actress	Kovan	Won
2020	Chelsea Film Festival	Best Actress	Kovan	Won
2024	Harper's Bazaar	Women Empowerment Award		Won
