= He's in the Army Now =

He's in the Army Now (O Şimdi Asker)
- Directed by: Mustafa Altıoklar
- Written by: Mustafa Altıoklar; Levent Kazak
- Produced by: Abdullah Oguz
- Starring: Ali Poyrazoğlu; Özcan Deniz; Pelin Batu; Yavuz Bingöl; Gökhan Özoğuz; Levent Kazak
- Cinematography: Soykut Turan
- Music by: Jingle House
- Production company: ANS
- Distributed by: Warner Bros. Pictures
- Release date: 12 March 2003
- Country: Turkey
- Language: Turkish

He's in the Army Now (original Turkish title: O Şimdi Asker) is a 2003 Turkish film, directed by Mustafa Altıoklar on a screenplay co-written by him and Levent Kazak.

== Plot ==
When the devastating Kocaeli earthquake occurs, the Turkish government passes a special law allowing people to complete their military service in a month. Many make use of this law including Murat (a factory owner), Ömer (a factory worker), Gökhan Özoğuz (frontman of the ska-punk band Athena), Nihat (who lost his family in the earthquake), Can (who was rejected by the army for being overweight), Levent (a thespian), Australian Turk Hüseyin and his son Seyfi Paul, Laptop Recep. They join those who are already at the base: Captain Volkan Ateş (the commanding officer) and Karlıdağ (who is on extended service due to indiscipline).

== Cast ==
- Ali Poyrazoğlu (Hüseyin)
- Pelin Batu (Müzeyyen)
- Mehmet Günsür (Nihat Denizer)
- Yavuz Bingöl (Karlıdağ)
- Levent Kazak (Artist-Levent Kazak)
- Ercan Saatçi (Murat)
- Naci Taşdöğen (Süslü Başçavuş)
- Özcan Deniz (Yüzbaşı Volkan Ateş)
- Gökhan Özoğuz (Athena Gökhan)
- Seray Sever (Doctor Yasemin Alkoç)
- Hakan Ka (Laptop Recep)
- Yiğit Özşener (Ömer)
- Ali Ersin Yenar (Can)
- Özlem Tekin (Aylin)
- Metin Belgin (Albay Arif Keser)
- Meral Okay (Resmiye)
- Küçük İskender (Savcı)
- Fethi Kantarcı (Seyfi Paul)
- Sarp Levendoğlu (Greek soldier)
- Yunus Günce (Doktor Okan)
- Erdem Ergüney (Çavuş)
- Nazif Uslu (Ağa)
- Emir Özbek (Sürmeli)
- Çağlayan Neyman
- Taner Karagüzel
- Güneş Emir
