= The Naked Citizen =

- Directed by: Başar Sabuncu
- Screenplay by: Başar Sabuncu
- Produced by: Başar Sabuncu
- Starring: Şener Şen, Nilgün Akçaoğlu
- Production company: Uzman Filmcilik
- Distributed by: Fanatik Video
- Release date: 1985
- Running time: 79 minutes
- Country: Turkey
- Language: Turkish

The Naked Citizen is a movie written and directed by Başar Sabuncu and starring Şener Şen. It tells about the troubles of the middle class (officer) section of the period and a period of the life of İbrahim, who was overwhelmed by these troubles.

== Story ==
İbrahim is a civil servant, begins to suffer from financial difficulties. Although he does a lot of additional work, his economic situation is getting worse and worse. Finally, he loses himself and undresses, and starts running in the middle of a street. He became known as the Naked Citizen after the media discovered the incident. In this way, he will earn thousands of times the amount of money he could not earn as an honest officer.

== Cast ==
- Şener Şen
- Nilgün Akçaoğlu
- Candan Sabuncu
- Ertuğrul Bilda
- Erdinç Bora
- Erhan Dilligil
- Renan Fosforoğlu
- Salih Kalyon
- Hikmet Karagöz
- Pekcan Koşar
- Zihni Küçümen
- Burçin Terzioğlu
- Kamran Usluer
- Bilge Zobu
