= Okan Yalabık =

Turkish actor

- Born: 1978 (age 47–48); Istanbul, Turkey
- Occupation: Actor
- Years active: 2001–present

Okan Yalabık (born 1978) is a Turkish actor. He graduated theater at Istanbul University State Conservatory and master of Film and Drama in Kadir Has University. He has appeared in more than twenty films since 2001.

== Life and career ==
Yalabık was born in 1978 in Istanbul as the second child of his family who originate from Balıkesir. He went to the Maçka Primary School at a young age showed interest in acting. According to his interview, it was his brother, Ozan, who brought home a cassette of Ferhan Şensoy's movie Ferhangi Şeyler and Yalabık memorized every line of it and became determined to become an actor. He later went to Şişli Terakki High School followed by Sakıp Sabancı Anadolu High School, and in 1993 by inviting Cengiz Deveci to the school he helped in the establishment of Sakıp Sabancı Anadolu High School Theater Department. Yalabık, who played in various roles in many amateur groups, eventually got enrolled in Istanbul University State Conservatory in 1997 to study theater. He had his first role in 1998 by playing the character Martı in a play at Kenter Theater. Later he portrayed different characters in the plays Nükte, Sırça Kümes, İnishmorelu Yüzbaşı at the same venue. In 2006, he appeared in Orhan Hakalmaz's clip Şu Kışlanın Kapısına, and in 2007, together Sezin Akbaşoğulları, he played in Robert Bosch GmbH's commercial for Turkey. Later he started to act in the movies such as Gülüm and Kolay Para.

He was cast in the hit crime series Yılan Hikâyesi. He played in Serseri with his ex-girlfriend Gamze Özçelik. He played in hit period series Hatırla Sevgili with Beren Saat, Cansel Elçin and in spin off series Bu Kalp Seni Unutur mu. In 2010, for he role as Hasan in Yavuz Turgul's movie Av Mevsimi he won the "Best Supporting Actor" award at the 4th Yeşilçam Awards. At the same year he took part in Kadir Has University Film and Drama Graduate Program.

In 2011, portrayed Pargalı İbrahim Pasha on the historical TV series Muhteşem Yüzyıl and has appeared in 82 episodes, though he does voiceovers in later episodes for his character.

In 2015, he was cast in atv's period series Analar ve Anneler directed by Mehmet Ada Öztekin, and was part of the main cast alongside Sinem Kobal, Hazar Ergüçlü and Binnur Kaya. But, due to low ratings, the series ended after 9 episodes.

In 2016, he was cast in a movie about the effects left behind by the Balkan Wars, titled Annemin Yarası, which was directed by Ozan Açıktan. At the same year he voiced the characters Adnan ve Çizer on the animation film Kötü Kedi Şerafettin based on Bülent Üstün's novel

He also continued his theater career by appearing on the play The 39 Steps in Turkey.

== Filmography ==
Film
Year	Title	Role	Director	Note
2024	Mavi Mağara	Harun	Altan Dönmez	
2024	Bir Cumhuriyet Şarkısı	Osman Zeki Üngör	Yağız Alp Akaydın	
2022	Cici	Kadir	Berkun Oya	
2021	Azizler	psychologist	Taylan Brothers	
2018	Bağcık		Görkem Yeltan	
2018	Balık Kraker		Yiğit Evgar	
2016	Tereddüt		Yeşim Ustaoğlu	
2016	Annemin Yarası	Mirsad	Ozan Açıktan	
2010	Av Mevsimi	Hasan Rıfat Adıgüzel (Çömez Hasan)	Yavuz Turgul	
2010	Peşpeşe	Kaan	Suvi Elif Alagöz	
2009	Güz Sancısı	Suat	Tomris Giritlioğlu	
2007	Mavi Mavi Gözlü Dev		Biket İlhan	
2006	Kabuslar Evi- Hayal-i Cihan	Cihan/Burak	Çağan Irmak	TV film series
2006	İlk Aşk	Rasim	Nihat Durak	
2005	Sen Ne Dilersen	Stavro	Cem Başeskioğlu	
2004	Büyü	Cemil	Orhan Oğuz	
2003	Başyapıt	Nejat	Tuna Kiremitci	Short movie
2003	Sen Kapat Ben Ararım			Short movie
2002	Kolay Para	Güven	Hakan Haksun	
2002	Gülüm	Serhat	Zeki Ökten	
2002	Sır Çocukları	2. erkek sevgili	Ümit Cin Güven/Aydın Sayman	Supporting actor
Web series
Year	Title	Role	Director	Note
2018	Hakan: Muhafız	Faysal Erdem / The Immortal	Can Evrenol	Main cast
2017	Masum	Tarık Bayrakçı	Seren Yüce	
2016	Seddülbahir 32 Saat	Cevat Paşa	Yasin Uslu	
TV series
Year	Title	Role	Director	Note
2019–2021	Hekimoğlu	Orhan Yavuz	Hülya Gezer	
2017	Vatanım Sensin	Charles	Taylan Brothers	
2015	Analar ve Anneler	Komiser Ayhan	Mehmet Ada Öztekin	
2011–2013	Muhteşem Yüzyıl	Pargalı İbrahim Paşa	Taylan Brothers	
2009–2010	Bu Kalp Seni Unutur Mu?	Kerim Yılmaz Sipahioğlu/Necdet Aygün	Aydın Bulut	
2007	Avrupa Yakası	himself	Jale Atabey	episode 121
2006–2008	Hatırla Sevgili	Necdet Aygün	Ümmü Burhan	
2005	Çapkın	Özgür	Bora Onur	
2005	Sensiz Olmuyor	Can	Taner Akvardar	
2003–2005	Serseri	Ömer	Cem Akyoldaş	
2003	Çaylak	Evren	Nihat Durak	
2003	Gel Kulağına Söyleyeyim			
2002	Yıldızların Altında	Engin	Filiz Kaynak	
2002	Zeybek Ateşi	Kerem	Veli Çelik	
2002	İki Arada	David	Ersoy Güler	
2001	Aşkım Aşkım	Tarkancan	Filiz Kaynak	episode 1
2001	Çifte Bela	Acar	Bülent Özdural	
1999	Yılan Hikayesi	Komiser Tayfun	Nihat Durak	
1998	Ğ TV	Bedri		
1994	Kaygısızlar		Uğur Erkır/Oğuz Yalçın	

== Theater ==
Theatre
Year	Title	Role	Writer	Director	Venue	Note
2018	Dünyada Karşılaşmış Gibi	Aziz	Berkun Oya	Berkun Oya	Krek Tiyatro	
2016	Kozalar		Adalet Ağaoğlu	Ayşenil Şamlıoğlu	Pangar	Sound designer
2014	Kral (Soytarım) Lear	Albany Dükü/ Gloucester Kontu	William Shakespeare	Yiğit Sertdemir	Pangar/Altıdan Sonra Tiyatro	
2009/2011	Bayrak		Berkun Oya	Berkun Oya	Krek Tiyatro	
2008/2016	39 Basamak		John Buchan/Patrick Barlow	Mehmet Birkiye	Kent Oyuncuları/Müşterek	
2005	Kumarbazın Seçimi	Carl	Patric Marber	Cengiz Bozkurt	Kent Oyuncuları	
2003	İnishmorelu Yüzbaşı	Brendan	Martin McDonagh	Mehmet Ergen	Kent Oyuncuları	
2001	İhtiras Tramvayı	Stanley Kowalski	Tennessee Williams	Yıldız Kenter	Kent Oyuncuları	
1999	Nükte		Margaret Edson	Yıldız Kenter	Kent Oyuncuları	
1998	Martı		Anton Çehov	Joseff Raikhelgaouz	Kent Oyuncuları	

== Voice ==
Voice
Year	Title	Role	Note
2016	Anadolu Masalları	Narrator	Documentary
2016	Kung Fu Panda 3	Po	Animation film
2016	Kötü Kedi Şerafettin	Adnan ve Çizer	Animation film
2016	Uncharted 4: A Thief's End	Nathan Drake	Video game
2011	Kung Fu Panda 2	Po	Animation film
2011	Uncharted 3: Drake's Deception	Nathan Drake	Video game
2009	Cüceler Devlere Karşı: Gizli Oda	Karga Sneaky	Animation film
2008	Kung Fu Panda	Po	Animation film
2007	Don Kişot	Horoz	Animation film

== Awards ==
- Yeşilçam Award for best supporting actor (2011)
