= Mrs. Salkım's Diamonds =

1999 Turkish drama film

- Theatrical release poster
- Directed by: Tomris Giritlioğlu
- Written by: Screenplay: Tamer Baran; Etyen Mahçupyan; Novel: Yılmaz Karakoyunlu
- Starring: Hülya Avşar; Kamran Usluer; Zuhal Olcay; Uğur Polat; Derya Alabora; Güven Kıraç; Zafer Algöz; Murat Daltaban; Nurseli İdiz; Yavuz Bingöl
- Cinematography: Yavuz Türkeri; Ercan Yılmaz
- Edited by: Avşar Film
- Music by: Tamer Çıray
- Distributed by: Avşar Film
- Release date: 19 November 1999
- Running time: 120 min.
- Country: Turkey
- Language: Turkish

Mrs. Salkım's Diamonds (Turkish: Salkım Hanım'ın Taneleri) is a 1999 Turkish drama film, directed by Tomris Giritlioğlu. It is based on the historical novel Mrs. Salkim's Diamonds by Yılmaz Karakoyunlu. The film, which went on nationwide general release across Turkey on 19 November 1999, won awards at film festivals in Antalya and Istanbul, including the Golden Orange Award for Best Film. This film was submitted to Turkey's 72nd Academy Awards for the Academy Award for Best Foreign Language Film, but was not accepted as a nominee.

== Novel ==
The novel Mrs. Salkım's Diamonds (Salkım Hanımın Taneleri), written by Turkish author and ANAP party member Yilmaz Karakoyunlu in 1990, recounts stories and witnesses of the non-Muslims during the Varlik Vergisi. The novel was developed into a film in 1999.

== Film ==
The film is set during the period of the Varlik Vergisi where many non-Muslims were forced to pay higher taxes, often in an arbitrary and unrealistic way. Around two thousand non-Muslims, who could not pay the amount demanded for the tax within the time-limit of thirty days, were arrested and sent to a forced labor camp in Aşkale in the Erzurum Province of eastern Turkey. Twenty-one of these laborers died there.

The movie language is in Turkish, however some scenes include Armenian. The film follows the plight of one family and traces how they were affected by the tax and other policies directed at non-Muslim ethnic minorities. The plot has a young Armenian man named Levon who is sent to Askale along with a man who considered himself ethnic Turkish, only to find out that there was Jewish ancestry in his bloodline (donme). Nora, an Armenian woman who was raped, kills herself and her baby because she did not want to bear a child of an involuntary pregnancy.

== Production ==
The film was shot on location in Aşkale, Büyükada and Mardin.

== Cast ==
- Hülya Avşar as Nora
- Kamran Usluer as Halit Bey
- Zuhal Olcay as Nefise
- Uğur Polat as Levon
- Derya Alabora as Nimet
- Güven Kıraç as Bekir
- Zafer Algöz as Durmuş
- Murat Daltaban as Clarinetist Artin

== Awards ==
=== Antalya Golden Orange Film Festival ===
- Best Picture (Golden Orange): Tomris Giritlioğlu
- Best Actor: Uğur Polat
- Best Music: Tamer Çıray
- Best Art Direction: Ziya Ulkenciler
- Best Film Editing: Mevlüt Kocak

=== Istanbul International Film Festival ===
- Best Actor: Güven Kıraç

== Reactions ==
Ahmet Çakar, a member of Parliament from the MHP, was outraged at the screening and believed it is indecent and unacceptable under the guidance of nationalism.

== See also ==
- List of submissions to the 72nd Academy Awards for Best Foreign Language Film
- List of Turkish submissions for the Academy Award for Best Foreign Language Film
