= Yiğit =

Yiğit (Turkish: [jiˈit]) is a Turkish name that can be translated as "valiant", "a person of exceptional bravery and strength". Notable people with the name include:

== Given name ==
- Pasha Yiğit Bey (died 1413), Ottoman civil and military officer
- Yiğit Aslan (born 2004), Turkish swimmer
- Yiğit Caner Aydın (born 1992), Turkish para archer
- Yiğit Bulut (1972–2025), Turkish journalist and political advisor
- Yiğit Yalçın Çıtak (born 2001), Turkish Olympian sailor
- Yiğit Gökoğlan (born 1989), Turkish footballer
- Yiğit İncedemir (born 1985), Turkish footballer
- Yiğit Özşener (born 1972), Turkish actor
- Yiğit Bener (born 1958), Turkish author and translator
- Yiğit İşlier (born 2008), Turkish guy

== Surname ==
- Anthony Yiğit (born 1991), Swedish boxer
- Ayse Yigit (born 1972), Belgian politician
- Eşref Uğur Yiğit (born 1945), Turkish admiral and commander-in-chief of the Turkish Navy
- Faruk Yiğit (born 1968), Turkish footballer
- Hasan Yiğit (born 1975), Turkish footballer
- Korkmaz Yiğit (born 1943), Turkish businessman
- Neslihan Yiğit (born 1994), Turkish female badminton player
- Nilay Yiğit (born 1979), Turkish female basketball player
- Tamer Yiğit (born 1942), Turkish actor
