= Pains of Autumn =

- Theatrical poster
- Directed by: Tomris Giritlioğlu
- Screenplay by: Etyen Mahçupyan; Nilgün Öneş; Tayfun Pirselimoğlu; Ali Ulvi Hünkar
- Produced by: Bahadir Atay; Fatih Enes Omeroglu
- Starring: Murat Yıldırım; Beren Saat; Okan Yalabık
- Music by: Tamer Çıray
- Distributed by: Özen Film
- Release date: 23 January 2009
- Running time: 112 mins.
- Country: Turkey
- Language: Turkish
- Box office: $3,388,636

Pains of Autumn (Turkish: Güz Sancısı) is a 2009 Turkish drama film, directed by Tomris Giritlioğlu, based on the novel by Yılmaz Karakoyunlu. The film, which went on nationwide general release across Turkey on 23 January 2009, was one of the highest-grossing Turkish films of 2009.

== Plot ==
The story is set in Istanbul, during the Pogrom of September 1955. Behçet (Murat Yildirim) is the only son of a father, in whom the government and the bureaucracy take a close interest due to his strong influence in Antakya. While he is working as an assistant researcher in the faculty of law in Istanbul, he falls under the sway of the extreme nationalist movement as a result of his upbringing and the influential role model of his father.

The only thing that causes Behçet to stumble on his convictions is Elena, a woman he secretly observes from his apartment. She is a Greek prostitute, who has been exploited by her grandmother since her mother left them. Elena is aware that she is being observed by Behçet and falls in love with him. They get close to each other which does not please Behçet's father and his political party.

The death of Behçet's friend Suat and the role that his father plays with the leaders of the party to exterminate the opposition and even the tolerated voices force Behçet to reconsider his political affiliation. During the Istanbul pogrom, riots which were organized by Turkish mob attacks directed at Istanbul's Greek minority, Behçet finds Elena dead after being hit by an activist. He takes her and remembers the words she said while lying on the bed in her apartment.

== Cast ==
- Murat Yıldırım - Behçet
- Okan Yalabık - Suat
- Beren Saat - Elena
- Belçim Bilgin - Nemika
- Umut Kurt - Ferit
- Zeliha Berksoy - Grandmother
- Emir Faruk Uğurcan - Ali

== Production ==
Production for the film, originally planned for 2002, commenced on 1 June 2008. The film was shot on location in Istanbul, Turkey from 3 August - 29 September 2008. Post production was completed on 23 January 2009.

== Release ==
The film opened in 180 screens across Turkey on 23 January 2009 at number one in the Turkish box office chart with an opening weekend gross of $555,543.

Gross Chart
| Date | Territory | Screens | Rank | Opening Weekend Gross | Total Gross | As Of |
|---|---|---|---|---|---|---|
| 23 January 2009 | Turkey | 180 | 1 | $555,543 | $3,105,177 | 8/23/09 |
| 30 April 2009 | Greece | 17 | 4 | $90,966 | $254,157 | 5/24/09 |
| 30 April 2009 | Germany | 21 | 37 | $15,447 | $28,179 | 5/10/09 |
| 1 May 2009 | Austria | 3 | 36 | $1,123 | $1,123 | 5/3/09 |

== Reception ==
=== Box office ===
The film was the sixth highest grossing Turkish film of 2009 and has made a total worldwide gross of $3,388,636.

=== Public controversy ===
Television talk shows and newspapers have covered both the film and the discussion of the events on which it is based. Its makers say the public debate is a result of an easing of curbs on freedom of expression accompanying Turkey's drive to meet European Union membership standards. This film couldn't have been made 10 years ago, screenwriter Etyen Mahçupyan told Today's Zaman, Though the laws on the books still limit free speech, the reality is there's less and less that can't be criticized.

September 6–7 was our Kristallnacht, Rev. Dositheos Anagnostopulous, a spokesman for the Greek Orthodox Church in Istanbul said, The chances of something like this happening again are slim, because Turkish youth today are more critical in their thinking. But to be sure, they need to learn that this catastrophe occurred, that's why the film is important.

A film like this might be just a film in another country, Mahçupyan continued, because there's been a vacuum and this issue was never discussed, the film now fulfils an important mission.

Yet, according to the Greek perspective, the film does not depict the events of September 1955 in their actual historic depth, not to mention the portrayal of the main Greek character as a prostitute sold off by her family, totally contrasting the Greek-envisioned social reality of the Greek community of the city, according to contemporary Greeks of Greece, which quite reflects the Turkish views over their non-Muslim neighbours, particularly the women. The film remains still highly controversial for being an attempt to white-wash the "responsibilities" of the Turkish people pretending it was all down to a political manipulation when this is a pogrom in which tens of thousands of Turkish citizens took part and which forced the majority of the Greek community to leave Istanbul.

== See also ==
- 2009 in film
- Turkish films of 2009
