= Fatih Al =

Turkish actor

- Born: 12 September 1976 (age 48); Ankara, Turkey
- Occupation: Actor
- Years active: 2003–present

Fatih Al (born 12 September 1976) is a Turkish actor.

== Biography ==
Fatih Al was born 12 September 1976 in Ankara. He graduated from Ankara University's School of Language and History – Geography with a degree in theatre studies. Later, Al worked in city theatres and then acted in movies and television series. He made his television debut in 2003 with a role in the series Sihirli Annem. He subsequently appeared in the series Rüzgarlı Bahçe in 2005. In 2007, he was casr in the movie Hazan Mevsimi - Bir Panayır Hikâyesi as Cemal. In 2010, Al returned to stage with a role in the play Korkuyu Beklerken. In the following year he starred in the movie Bizim Büyük Çaresizliğimiz and went on stage again with the play Giderayak. In the same year, he began portraying Matrakçı Nasuh in the historical drama series Muhteşem Yüzyıl, after which he rose to prominence. In 2013, he starred in the movie Evdeki Yabancılar as Yaşar. In 2014, he appeared in the movie Daire as Feramus and starred in FOX's TV series Not Defteri as Mahir Soysal. He is also known for his role in the Netflix original series Atiye.

== Theatre ==
- Giderayak, 2011
- Korkuyu Beklerken, 2010
- Dolu Düşün Boş Konuş, 2014–2016

== Filmography ==
=== TV series ===
- Sihirli Annem, 2005–2006, Hasan Ali
- Rüzgarlı Bahçe, 2005, İbrahim
- Muhteşem Yüzyıl, 2011–2013, Matrakçı Nasuh
- Not Defteri, 2014, Mahir Soysal
- Karadayı, 2014, Sosyete Yusuf
- Kanatsız Kuşlar, 2017, Muzaffer
- Atiye, 2019–2020, Nazım Kurtiz
- Kahraman Babam, 2021, Yavuz
- Menajerimi Ara, 2021, Timur
- Aşk 101, 2021, Yıldıray Pınar
- Adı Sevgi, 2022, Ekrem Baykara
- Vermem Seni Ellere, 2023, Şakir

=== Film ===
- Hazan Mevsimi - Bir Panayır Hikâyesi, 2007, Cemal (İşçi)
- Bizim Büyük Çaresizliğimiz, 2011, Çetin
- Evdeki Yabancılar, 2013, Yaşar
- Daire, 2014, Feramus
- Uzaklarda Arama, 2015, Bakkal Ömer
- Beceriksiz Katil, 2017
- Sonsuz Aşk, 2017, Tufan
- Sofra Sırları
- Smuggling Hendrix, 2018, Hasan
- Kim Bu Aile?, 2022
