= The Little Gypsy Witch =

2011 film

- Directed by: Tomislav Žaja
- Written by: Irena Krčelić
- Starring: Sabina Ajrula; Selma Ibrahimi; Marin Arman Grbin
- Cinematography: Mario Delić
- Edited by: Hrvoje Mršić
- Release date: 19 July 2011 (Pula Film Festival)
- Running time: 96 minutes
- Country: Croatia
- Language: Croatian

The Little Gypsy Witch (Croatian: Duh babe Ilonke) is a 2011 Croatian children's fantasy film which is directed by Tomislav Žaja.

== Cast ==
- Sabina Ajrula as Baba Ilonka
- Selma Ibrahimi as Manuša
- Marin Arman Grbin as Zdenko
- Aleksandra Balmazović as Aska
- Rakan Rushaidat as Hrast
- Krunoslav Sarić as Kasum
