= Sabina Ajrula =

Macedonian-Turkish actress (1946–2021)

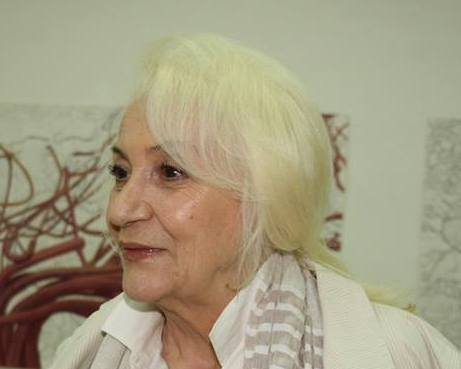
- Born: 17 April 1946; Skopje, Macedonia, Yugoslavia
- Died: 10 August 2021 (aged 75); Skopje, North Macedonia
- Other names: Sabina Toziya
- Occupation: Actress
- Years active: 1969–2021

Sabina Ajrula Toziya (17 April 1946 – 10 August 2021) was a Macedonian-Turkish actress best known for playing Hayriye Çakırbeyli in crime-drama series Eşkıya Dünyaya Hükümdar Olmaz and Afife Hatun in Muhteşem Yüzyıl.

== Life and career ==
Toziya was born on 17 April 1946 in Skopje, Macedonia, Yugoslavia, which is now within the borders of North Macedonia. She studied acting at the Skopje State Theatre. After acting in Macedonia and Yugoslavia, Toziya played the character of Afife Hatun in the TV series Magnificent Century, which was broadcast on Star TV for the first time in Turkey. She played the role of Hayriye Çakırbeyli in the TV series Eşkıya Dünyaya Hükümdar Olmaz. She left the show in January 2021 after suffering a partial stroke due to a brain tumor.

== Death ==
On 10 August 2021, Toziya died at the age of 75, after suffering a stroke due to a tumor in her brain.

== Filmography ==
=== Films ===
- Times Without War (1969)
- Itrata vdovica (1969)
- Vetar vo kutice kibrit (1970)
- Zedj (1969) - Nikolina
- Precek (1971) - Julka
- Dobra Dolina (1973)
- Misery (1975)
- Stand Up Straight, Delfina (1977) - Neda Korkut
- Beliot Sid (1978)
- Vreme, vodi (1980) - Kjuskoica
- The Lead Brigade (1980) - Vera
- The Red Horse (1981)
- Juzna Pateka (1982)
- Opasni trag (1984) - Bolnicarka
- Jazol (1985)
- Bolva v'uvo (1991) - Sandebis
- Tattoo (1991)
- Vreme, zivot (1992)
- Angels of the Dumps (1995) - Rabotninckata
- Na balkanot ne se pie caj (1998)
- Today, Tomorrow (1998) - Mother
- Kontakt (2005) - Neighbour Woman
- Krcma na patot kon Evropa (2005) - Sultanaa
- Shadows (2005) - Dr. Vera Perkova
- The Little Gypsy Witch (2011) - Baba Ilonka
- Materijal za audicija (2013) - Silva
- Honey Night (2015) - Cveta
- Amok (2016) - Mother
- My Mother's Wound (2016) - Mevlide
- Bal Kaymak (2018) - Havva
- Vera (2019) - Vera
- Aman Reis Duymasin (2019) - Mother
- Escape To The Sea (2021) - Anka
- M (2022)

=== Television ===
- Solunski patrdii (1986) - Fatime
- Sluski od zivotot (1987) Mother
- Makedonski narodni prikazni (1994)
- Salon Harmoni (1998) - Grozda
- Nase maalo (2002) - Vesterka
- Makedonski narodni prikazni 2 (2012-2015)
- Magnificent Century (2012–2014) - Afife Hatun
- Familijata Markovski (2017–2019) - Milica
- Zoki Poki (2020) - Zoki Poki Grandmother / Narrator
- Eskiya Dünyaya Hükümdar Olmaz (2015–2021) - Hayriye Çakirbeyli
