= My Mother's Wound =

Annemin Yarası
- Original title: Annemin Yarası
- Directed by: Ozan Açıktan
- Written by: Funda Çetin
- Produced by: Necati Akpınar
- Starring: Meryem Uzerli; Ozan Güven; Okan Yalabık; Belçim Bilgin; Bora Akkaş; Sabina Ajrula
- Music by: Jingle House
- Production company: BKM Film
- Release date: March 11, 2016 (Turkey)
- Country: Turkey
- Language: Turkish

Annemin Yarası (English: My Mother's Wound) is a 2016 Turkish dramatic film. Set in Bosnia and Herzegovina, it tells the story of Salih, a Bosniak teenager seeking revenge against the man who raped his mother during the Bosnian War. Annemin Yarası was released by BKM Film on 11 March 2016.

== Plot ==
Upon turning 18, Salih leaves the orphanage in Zenica in modern-day Bosnia, where he was raised, to search for his parents. Mr Sadik the principal hesitantly gives him the address of Mirsad, a crippled cobbler who lives in Simin Han.

On Salih's arrival, Mirsad insists Salih joins the family for lunch, where he meets Mirsad's wife Nerma and their young son Vedat. He also meets Nerma's elderly mother Mrs Mevlide, who takes him aside and in private reveals to him that he is Nerma's son. During the war Nerma and other Bosnian female Muslims had taken refuge with an uncle. Serbian paramilitary troops attacked the house and killed Nerma's uncle. Their commander, one Borislav Milić, who was a neighbour well known to the family with an eagle tattooed on his chest, ordered all the troops out and then raped Nerma who was only 15 or 16 at the time. With Nerma pregnant and severely traumatised, Mrs Mevlide arranged to give up baby Salih to the orphanage as Nerma suffered amnesia and had to take chronic medication to manage the trauma of her shattered life.

Mrs Mevlide demands that Salih immediately leave, giving him money and her earrings. As he departs he bumps into a surprised Nerma bringing them lunch. Salih hands her the earrings on his way out. A severely enraged Salih resolves to search for Borislav but he discovers that there are multiple persons answering to that name.

His search brings him to a farm in Prijedor, a predominantly Serbian town, where he poses as a job seeker. Borislav is about to send Salih away but his wife Marija, who resents discrimination against Muslims, takes to Salih and hires him above the protestations. Borislav reluctantly agrees to a 2-week trial.

Salih unsuccessfully tries to find evidence linking Borislav to the rape of his mother. On the contrary he finds Borislav to be a loving husband to Marija even though they are unable to have children, and a hero when he rescues a boy from a burning building.

During a hunting trip with Borislav and his rowdy tattooed former paramilitary friends, Salih eventually gets to see Borislav's chest as he takes off his shirt. To Salih's relief, the tattoo on Borislav's chest is not of an eagle. Salih grows comfortable with his life on the farm, bonding in particular with Marija. In the meantime, his mother Nerma struggles with her trauma taking its toll on her mental health.

Salih decides to move out of the farmhouse to find the rapist and leaves a note, but his plans are foiled when Borislav drags him off fishing and he hurriedly hides the note. Marija discovers the note and confronts him. Salih confesses that he is trying to find his parents but says nothing of the rape.

Marija decides she needs to help him find his parents and visits the town's registry officials, eventually discovering his connection with Mrs Mevlide. In the meantime, Borislav tattoos Salih whilst both of them are drunk. Borislav ends up in hospital due to over-drinking but is later discharged.

Nerma continues to struggle with her amnesia and tries unsuccessfully to get her mother to tell her what happened in order to put the pieces together. Her mother leaves to stay with her sister. Marija phones and speaks to Nerma, assuming her to be Mrs Mevlide, and tells her that Salih works on her farm and that they are desperately trying to find his family. She invites Nerma to visit.

Desperate to regain her memory of what happened, Nerma rushes off to the farm where she finds Salih on the grounds and demands the truth. Salih denies any knowledge. She then asks if Salih is her son, to which he cryptically replies, "I am my mother's wound."

Nerma goes to the farmhouse to use the bathroom and meets Marija. As she leaves she sees a photograph of Borislav and her memory returns. She recognises him as the rapist realising also that Salih is her son. Salih then recalls through his drunken haze that the eagle tattoo on Borislav's chest had been inked over. Realising his identity has been discovered, Borislav arrives with a shotgun and a standoff ensues. Salih angrily denounces Borislav and disowns him as his father. Nerma drags Salih away and they leave on foot.

Marija confronts Borislav and takes the shotgun which she points at her own head. Salih and Nerma meet Mirsad driving down on the road searching for Nerma and they hear a gunshot coming from the farmhouse. As Salih races back to the farmhouse, a second shot rings out, implying that both Marija and Borislav committed suicide. The film ends with Nerma calling out to Salih.

== Cast ==
- Meryem Uzerli - Marija
- Ozan Güven - Borislav
- Okan Yalabık - Mirsad
- Belçim Bilgin - Nerma
- Bora Akkaş - Salih
- Sabina Ajrula - Mevlide
- Ayça Eren
- Mehmet Ergen - İhsan
