= Burak Sergen =

Turkish actor (born 1961)

- Born: 9 February 1961 (age 65); Ankara, Turkey
- Occupation: Actor
- Years active: 1996–present
- Spouses: Pamela Spence (m. 1991; div. 1992) Işıl Sergen (m. 1999; div. 2018) Nihan Ünsal (m. 2021; div. 2021)
- Children: 1

Burak Sergen (born 9 February 1961) is a Turkish actor. He has appeared in more than thirty films since 1996.

== Selected filmography ==
=== Film ===
Year	Title	Role	Notes
1996	Istanbul Beneath My Wings	Murad IV	
1997	Cholera Street	Arap Sado	
2000	Beans		
2001	Summer Love		
2002	Hittites	Šuppiluliuma I	
2006	Turks in Space	Uga	
2008	120	Sermet Bey/Musa Çavuş	
2010	Secret of the Sultan	Derviş	

=== Television ===
Year	Title	Role	Notes
2008	Derdest	Bülent Yıldırım	
2012	Araf Zamanı	Veysel Atay	
2013	Saklı Kalkan	Tarik Cevher	
2014	Kızılema	Süleyman Hekimoğlu	
2015	Sen Benimsin	Simal Toprak	
2017	Fi	Tuğrul Pasaoğlu	
2015–2017	Kara Sevda	Galip Kozcuoğlu	Antagonist
2017–2018	Çukur	Baykal	
2019	Halka	İlhan Tepeli	
2019–2020	Eşkıya Dünyaya Hükümdar Olmaz	Feyyaz Meftun	
2021	Akıncı	Prolog	
2020–2022	Sadakatsiz	Haluk Güçlü	
2022	Gülümse Kaderine	Kudret	
2023-2024	Hudutsuz Sevda	Rızvan Leto	
2024	Siyah Kalp	Samet Şansalan	
