= Scorpion (2018 film) =

- Theatrical release poster
- Directed by: Muhlisa Azizova
- Screenplay by: Rashid Malikov; Abduhamil Sodiqov; Bob Underwood
- Starring: Farhod Mahmudov; Shahzoda Matchanova; Karim Mirhadiyev; Yulduz Rajabova; Akbar Rasulov; Vyacheslav Razbegaev; Raʼno Shodiyeva; Murat Yıldırım
- Cinematography: Max Tsui
- Release dates: 28 November 2018 (ProLogue International Film Festival); 1 December 2018 (Uzbekistan)
- Running time: 94 minutes
- Country: Uzbekistan
- Languages: Uzbek, Russian
- Budget: $5 million

Scorpion is a 2018 Uzbek action drama thriller film directed by Muhlisa Azizova and written by Rashid Malikov, Abduhamil Sodiqov, and Bob Underwood. The film features an ensemble cast that includes Farhod Mahmudov, Shahzoda Matchanova, Karim Mirhadiyev, Yulduz Rajabova, Akbar Rasulov, Vyacheslav Razbegaev, Raʼno Shodiyeva and Murat Yıldırım.

Scorpion premiered in ProLogue International Film Festival on November 28, 2018, and was released in the Uzbekistan on December 1, 2018. The filming took place in cities of Uzbekistan, Russia and Morocco. The soundtrack of the film was performed by the famous singer Valeriya.

== Plot ==
An agent of the Uzbek special services, Timur Saliev, is conducting an operation to seize the Scorpion terrorist group when he learns that his brother, whom he considered dead, is alive and belongs to this very organization. Risking his life and career, Saliev follows in his brother's footsteps into a country engulfed in chaos and the mercilessness of war. Suspected of treason, he faces a choice that will affect not only his life, but also the peace in the region.

== Cast ==
- Farhod Mahmudov as Temur Soliyev
- Akbar Rasulov as Jahongir Soliyev
- Murat Yıldırım as Yassir
- Vyacheslav Razbegaev as Peter McCallister
- Yulduz Rajabova as Catherine Trammel
- Shahzoda Matchanova as Petra
- Karim Mirhadiyev as General Mahmudov
- Raʼno Shodiyeva as Umarova
