= Zeynep Özder =

Turkish actress (born 1980)

- Born: 15 August 1980 (age 45); Ankara, Turkey
- Education: Bilkent University School of Music and Performing Arts; Gazi University, Music Teaching (M.A. and Ph.D.)
- Occupation: Actress
- Years active: 2009–present
- Spouse: Mehmet Bilal (m. 2013)

Zeynep Özder (born Ankara, 15 August 1980) is a Turkish television and film actress.

== Life and career ==
At the age of 8 she started taking piano and cello lessons. After graduating from Ankara Anatolian Performing Arts High School, she enrolled in Bilkent University Conservatory and graduated with a degree in music and performing arts in 2004. She later received her master's degree in music from Gazi University and got her PhD in music teaching from the same school. Meanwhile, she served as a cellist on the Gazi University Academic Chamber Orchestra. She worked as a contract artist in the Presidential Symphony Orchestra between 2005 and 2007. She participated in concerts with the university orchestra in various countries. After graduating, she gave piano and cello lessons at Durul Gence Music School in 2009. She gave a concert with the Tekfen Philharmonic Orchestra in 2011.

Özder received acting lessons at the Stella Adler Studio in New York in 2011. She then joined Gaye Sökmen Agency, which managed her acting roles. In 2009, she made her television debut with her role as Eda in the series Samanyolu. In 2011 she made her cinematic debut with Bir Avuç Deniz, in which she portrayed the character Dilek Hanoğlu. She continued her cinematic career with the movie Sen Kimsin?, which was released in 2012. She continued to have recurring roles in a number of TV series, including Dila Hanım, İntikam and 4N1K İlk Aşk. She rose to prominence with her role as Fatma Pesend Hanım in the historical drama series Payitaht: Abdülhamid and as Begim Şehver Sultan in Alparslan: Büyük Selçuklu.

== Filmography ==
=== Television ===
Year	Title	Role	Network	No. of episodes
2009–2010	Samanyolu	Eda Andaç	ATV	29 episodes
2010	Adanalı	Maya Mertcan	ATV	9 episodes
2012	Koyu Kırmızı	Mercan	Star TV	13 episodes
2012–2013	Dila Hanım	Hülya	Star TV	
2013–2014	İntikam	Aslı Sağlam	Kanal D	23 episodes
2015–2016	Eve Dönüş	Pınar	ATV	22 episodes
2017	Payitaht: Abdülhamid	Fatma Pesend Hanım	TRT1	14 episodes
2018	4N1K İlk Aşk	Ela Safak	Fox	12 episodes
2019–2020	Benim Adım Melek	Başak	TRT1	35 episodes
2021–	Alparslan: Büyük Selçuklu	Begim Şehver Sultan	TRT1	

=== Film ===
Year	Title	Role	Director
2011	Bir Avuç Deniz	Dilek Hanoğlu	Leyla Yılmaz
2012	Sen Kimsin?	Pelin	Ozan Açıktan
2017	Sonsuz Aşk	Berrin	Ahmet Katıksız
