= 120 (film) =

- Theatrical poster
- Directed by: Murat Saraçoğlu; Özhan Eren
- Written by: Özhan Eren
- Produced by: Özhan Eren
- Starring: Cansel Elçin; Özge Özberk; Burak Sergen; Ahmet Uz; Demir Karahan; Emin Olcay
- Music by: Özhan Eren
- Production company: Posta Tanitim Hizmetleri
- Distributed by: Özen Film; Kinostar; Cinegraph
- Release date: February 15, 2008
- Running time: 120 min
- Country: Turkey
- Language: Turkish
- Budget: US$3,000,000
- Box office: US$3,714,949

120 is a 2008 Turkish war film directed by Murat Saraçoğlu and Özhan Eren based on the true story of 120 children who died in 1915 carrying ammunition for the Battle of Sarikamish against the Russians during World War I. The film went on general release across Turkey on February 15, 2008 and is one of the highest grossing Turkish films of 2008.

== Production ==
Writer, producer and co-director Özhan Eren, an expert on the Caucasus Campaign in World War I, who came across the story of the 120 boys while doing the research for his bestselling The Road to Sarıkamış (Turkish: Sarıkamış'a Giden Yol), spent three years preparing for the film.

I adore period movies... this is what stimulates me about the movie... The authentic historical scenario of the movie is one of the features that make the film exceptional. We show what our ancestors sacrificed -- and under which conditions -- for the country. There may not be many battle scenes, but there certainly is emotion around every corner. It is about the heroism of 120 children. I expect the audience to respond positively, looking from this perspective.

— Co-director Mustafa Saraçlıoğlu

It is a theme I have stressed for years. We went through unique battles and pretty hard days as a nation. However, we are somehow unsuccessful in making movies out of them. We are unable to tell our history to the coming generations... We experienced calamities. In each home we have a martyr. These [stories] have to be told, and '120' is a crucial project in this respect. It will be tiring for me, but it is worth it.

— Actor Emin Olcay

The film, which received a record amount of support from the Turkish Ministry of Culture and Tourism, was shot over two years in harsh conditions on location in Safranbolu, Van and Istanbul, Turkey. When heavy snow, expected in Van for the winter settings of the film, failed to arrive, 20 trucks, two loaders and 30 staff members had to be hired to bring 300 tons of snow from Çaldıran to Van for several scenes.

== Plot ==
During the Battle of Sarikamish, the Ottoman army runs out of ammunition and appeals for help to the people of Van, who happen to have supplies. However, the First World War is on and all the men are fighting at the four corners of the empire and therefore cannot respond to the appeal. The young children of Van want to do something and when the principal of a school, who has lost a son in the war, suggests that they transport ammunition to the army, 120 young boys aged 12 to 17 volunteer and take to the road. The movie tells the true story of the 120 boys and their sisters and mothers left behind, who wait for their return.

== Cast ==
- Ozge Ozberk
- Burak Sergen
- Cansel Elcin
- Yaşar Abravaya
- Melih Atalay
- Ozan Cem Dur
- Emin Olcay
- Demir Karahan
- Deniz Güngören
- Halil Kumova
- İncilay Şahin
- Misak Toros
- Melza Burcu İnce
- İbrahim Öner
- Mustafa Karakoyun
- Ahmet Uz
- Oytun Öztamur
- Emre Törün
- Alican Yılmaz

== Release ==
The film went on general release, with what Emrah Güler described as, an aggressive (and unnecessarily nationalistic) marketing campaign, in 179 screens across Turkey on February 15, 2008 at number one in the Turkish box office with an opening weekend gross of US$376,812.

The film had a gala screening in Stuttgart on May 7, 2008 before going on general release in 32 screens across Germany on May 8, 2008 at number 17 in the German box office with an opening weekend gross of US$53,763.

The film was re-released, to coincide with August 30 Victory Day (Turkish: Zafer Bayramı) celebrations, in 32 screens across Turkey on August 29, 2008 at number thirteen in the Turkish box office with an opening weekend gross of US$23,071.

== Reception ==
=== Box office ===
The film was in the Turkish box office charts for 41 weeks and is the 9th highest-grossing Turkish film of 2008 with a total nationwide gross of US$3,289,480.

=== Reviews ===
Despite the tone of the press release and the trailer... [it is] attracting impressive crowds thanks to rising nationalism, fueled by, among many things, the debates around the Armenian issue, [the film] is very careful not to become another tool for mindless propaganda in the recent nationalist discourses. And neither does it play out as praise of war. It simply tells a sad story, lost to the annals of history. The trick is that the period the movie carefully taps into is a minefield already, whether you are careful not to take sides or overlook certain details. [The film] opens up another discussion on whether you can make an anti-war film through depicting war and the unnecessary deaths of many, when most of the time it is better to find a justification for those deaths if you do not want your young to have died in vain.

— Hürriyet Daily News reviewer Emrah Güler

On the whole, [it] is a powerful film despite its many setbacks, including the usual didactic dialogue, overdose of melodrama and over-length running time. It reminds us that the milestones forming the Turkish Republic were achieved with great personal and social sacrifice under the harshest of conditions, where disease and poverty had already overcome Anatolia. Throughout our childhood and youth, we are always taught how painstakingly difficult and laborious it was to declare independence to create modern Turkey, and yes, sometimes we hear it to too many times for own good. However, the makers of '120' -- I want to believe with good intentions -- succinctly remind us that indeed it was never easy as a nation to get to where we are now. In our current socio-politically volatile times, let's just hope that history doesn't repeat itself.

— Today's Zaman reviewer Emine Yıldırım
