= Başar Sabuncu =

- Born: September 9, 1943; Istanbul, Turkey
- Died: June 17, 2015 (aged 71); Istanbul, Turkey
- Occupations: Film director, screenwriter, cinematographer, actor
- Years active: 1961–2004
- Spouses: Sevgi Soysal (m. 1965; div. 1971): Candan Sabuncu

Başar Sabuncu (September 9, 1943 – June 17, 2015) was a Turkish film director, screenwriter, cinematographer and occasional actor.

== Early life ==
Sabuncu started acting when he was a student at the St. Joseph High School.

== Filmography ==
Film director
Year	Film	Notes
1985	Çıplak Vatandaş	
1986	Kupa Kızı	
1986	Asılacak Kadın	
1987	Kaçamak	
1988	Zengin Mutfağı	
1994	Yolcu	

Film writer
Year	Film	Notes
1975	Şöhret Budalası	
1979	Adak	
1980	Talihli Amele	
1983	Şalvar Davası	
1985	Çıplak Vatandaş	
1986	Asılacak Kadın	
1986	Kupa Kızı	
1987	Kaçamak	
1988	Zengin Mutfağı	
1994	Yolcu	
Television writer
Year	Series	Notes
1989	Kaldırım Serçesi	

Film actor
Year	Film	Role	Notes
1963	Dişi Örümcek		
1990	Aşk Filmlerinin Unutulmaz Yönetmeni		
