= Yiğit Özşener =

Turkish actor

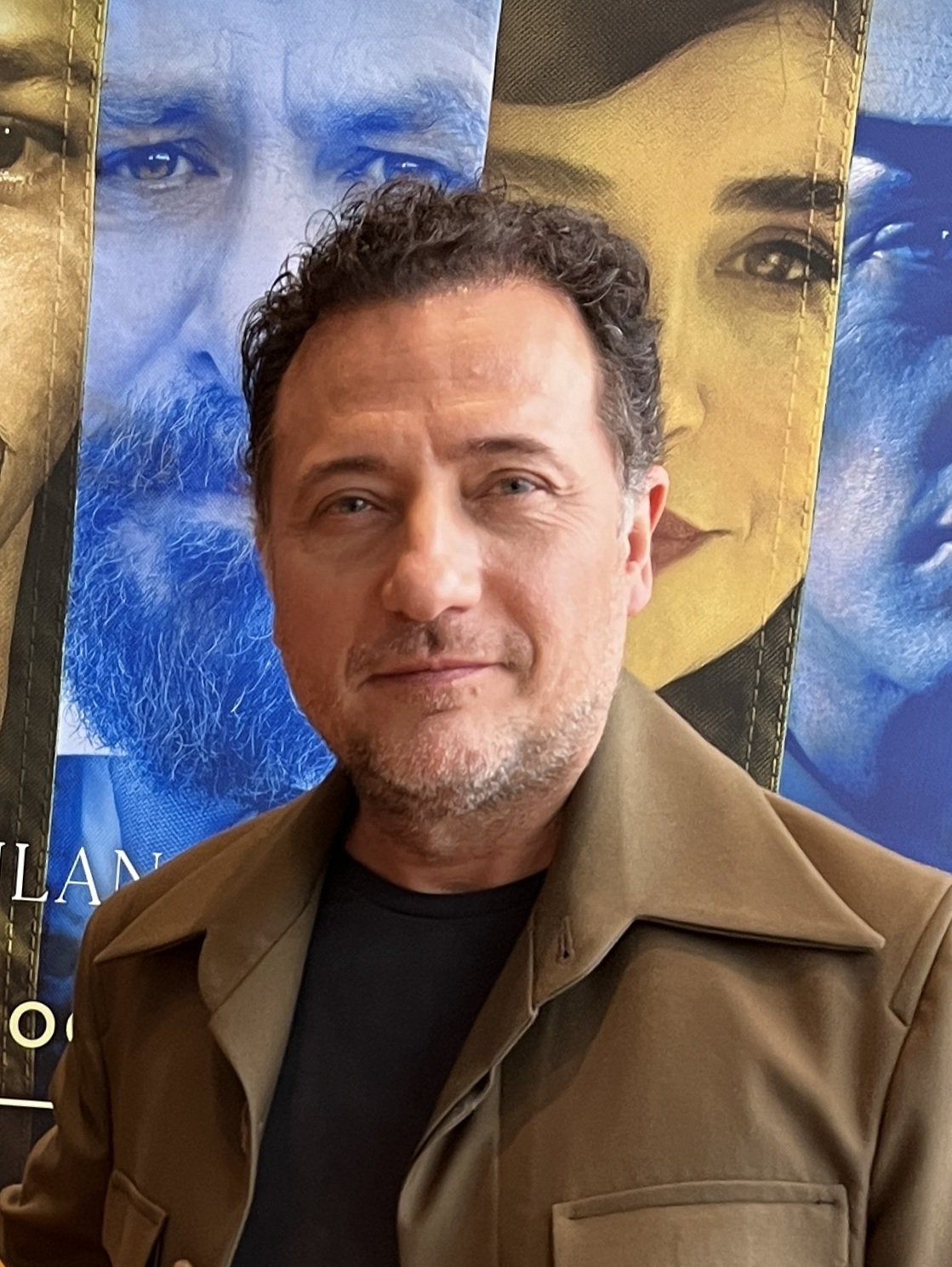
- Born: 6 April 1972 (age 54); İzmir, Turkey
- Education: Yıldız Technical University
- Occupation: Actor
- Years active: 1997–present

Yiğit Özşener (Turkish pronunciation: [jiˈit ˈœzʃenæɾ]; born 6 April 1972) is a Turkish actor.

== Early life ==
After Ottoman Empire collapsed, His paternal family is of Turkish descent who immigrated from Kavala. His maternal family is of Turkish descent who immigrated from Skopje. Özşener graduated from Yıldız Technical University with a degree in Electronics and Communications Engineering in 1996. Özşener, who had begun studying acting at the Şahika Tekand acting studio, began acting there in various plays, including Harold Pinter's The Dumb Waiter, which was directed by Şahika Tekand herself.

== Career ==
He gained national attention for appearing as the "Özgür Çocuk" (Free Child) with singer Nil Karaibrahimgil in a series of commercials for Turkcell and Nil Karaibrahimgil's music video "Ben Özgürüm". He appeared in the series Karanlıkta Koşanlar based from detective novel with Haluk Bilginer, Uğur Yücel. Then he joined in the series Üzgünüm Leyla alongside veteran actors Perran Kutman, Çetin Tekindor, Selçuk Yöntem, Burçin Terzioğlu.

Between 2007 and 2009, he played Cemil Paşazade in the series Dudaktan Kalbe adapted from Reşat Nuri Güntekin's classic novel. Since 2009, he played Cengiz Atay in the hit revenge series Ezel. His crime series "Son" was sold to USA, France, Spain, Russian, Netherlands for adaptation. Due to Nejat İşler left "Rüzgar" role, he started to play as "Rüzgar" with Beren Saat in second season of İntikam which Turkish remake of "Revenge". He had guest roles in Galip Derviş Turkish version of "Monk" and popular series Cesur ve Güzel, "Kırmızı Oda", "10 Bin Adım".

He played crime series "Bozkır" and "Ramo". He played in historical series "Yüzyıllık Mühür", "Barbaroslar: Akdeniz'in Kılıcı". He played in series "Cezailer" about Rosenhan experiment.

During his cinema career, he played in many hit films. He had parts in films such as O Şimdi Asker, Gece 11:45 and Beş Vakit. In 2011, he appeared in the film series Aşk Tesadüfleri Sever. He starred as Mete Avunduk in the film series Kaybedenler Kulübü about the 1990s cult radio show of the same name. He played in period film "Dedemin İnsanları" and "Güneşi Gördüm". With Dudaktan Kalbe's co-star Aslı Tandoğan, he played in film "Bir Kahramanın Rüyası" twice. He portrayed as Mustafa Kemal Atatürk in film "Zaferin Rengi".

== Filmography ==
Web series
Year	Title	Role	Notes
2001	Karanlıkta Koşanlar	Mehmet	Leading role
2016	Yüzyıllık Mühür	Hilmi	Leading role
2018-	Bozkır	Seyfi	Leading role
2022	Cezailer	Mert	Leading role
2022	10 Bin Adım	Gönenç	Guest
TV series
Year	Title	Role	Notes
2001-2003	Üzgünüm Leyla	İshak	Supporting role
2002	Unutma Beni	Esat	Guest
2002	Zeybek Ateşi	Gazeteci Burak	Guest
2003	Estağfurullah Yokuşu	Sadi	Leading role
2004	Arapsaçı		Leading role
2004	24 Saat	Yiğit	Leading role
2005	Rüzgarlı Bahçe	Ozan	Leading role
2006	Rüya Gibi	Cenk Öztürk	Leading role
2007–2009	Dudaktan Kalbe	Cemil Paşazade	Leading role
2009–2011	Ezel	Cengiz Atay	Leading role
2012	Son	Selim	Leading role
2012	Esir Şehrin Gözyaşları - Bir Ferhat ile Şirin Hikayesi	Ferhat	Leading role
2013	İntikam	Rüzgar Denizci	Joined
2013	Galip Derviş	Engin Seçim	Joined
2017	Cesur ve Güzel	Rıza	Joined
2020	Ramo	Yavuz Gürkan	Supporting role
2021	Kırmızı Oda	Zafer Karahanoğlu	Guest role
2021–2022	Barbaroslar: Akdeniz'in Kılıcı	Pietro	Leading role
2022–2023	Sıfırıncı Gün	Ejder /Salih	Leading role
2023–2024	Şahane Hayatım	Onur Gümüşçü	Leading role
Film
Year	Title	Role	Notes
2000	Herkes Kendi Evinde		
2001	Yeşil Işık		
2002	O Şimdi Asker	Ömer	
2003	Giz		
2003	Crude (Fırsat)	Ali	
2004	Çalınan Ceset	Yiğit	TV film
2004	One Day In Europe	Policeman	
2004	Gece 11:45	Okan	
2005	Tombala		TV film
2005	Last Looks		
2006	Kabuslar Evi: Onlara Dokunmak	Yunus	TV film
2006	Beş Vakit	Yusuf	
2007	Kayıp		TV film
2008	Kung Fu Panda		dubbing
2008	Prenses Lissi ve Karadamı Yeti		dubbing
2009	Güneşi Gördüm	Caner	
2011	Aşk Tesadüfleri Sever	Burak	
2011	Kaybedenler Kulübü	Mete	
2011	Dedemin İnsanları	İbrahim	
2014	Ocak Ayının İki Yüzü		
2017	İşe Yarar Bir Şey	Bahtıma Takılan Karaçalı Gibi Yusuf	
2017	Bir Kahramanın Rüyası		TV film
2018	Kaybedenler Kulübü Yolda	Mete	
2022	Aile Toplantısı		
2023	Zaferin Rengi	Mustafa Kemal Atatürk	
Short film
Year	Title		
2001	Model		
2003	Prenses...Kankam ve Ben		
2004	Apartman		
2006	Taklit		
2007	Yoldaki Kedi		
2020	Hatıra Fotoğrafı		
