= Kamran Usluer =

- Born: 1937; İzmir, Turkey
- Died: 26 July 2004 (aged 66–67); Istanbul, Turkey
- Occupation: Actor
- Years active: 1966–2004

Kamran Usluer (1937 – 26 July 2004) was a Turkish film actor. He appeared in more than fifty films from 1966 to 2004.

== Selected filmography ==
Film
Year	Title	Role	Notes
1999	Mrs. Salkım's Diamonds		
1996	The Bandit		
1985	Çıplak Vatandaş		
1979	The Canal		
