= Cansel Elçin =

Turkish actor (born 1973)

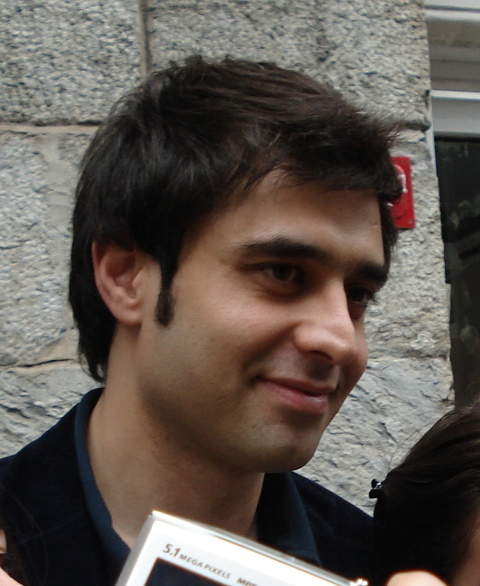
- Elçin in 2006
- Born: 20 September 1973 (age 53); İzmir, Turkey
- Occupation: Actor
- Years active: 1999–present
- Spouses: Pınar Apaydın (m. 2012; div. 2017) Zeynep Tuğçe Bayat (m. 2020)
- Children: 1

Cansel Elçin (born 20 September 1973) is a Turkish-French actor.

== Biography ==
Cansel Elçin was born on 20 September 1973, in İzmir, Turkey, but his family moved to France when he was 9 years old. Elcin grew up trilingually and can speak French, English and Turkish. He studied in the Ecole Florent in Paris, where he was classmates with Audrey Tautou. He has French citizenship.

He is known for the hit period series Hatırla Sevgili alongside Beren Saat and Okan Yalabık. With Özge Özberk, Berk Hakman, he played in period series Kırık Kanatlar and in historical film 120. He played in sci-fi Börü: 2039. He portrayed as Kenan in Kötü Yol based on classic novel.

His co-stars are Tuba Büyüküstün in Gönülçelen, Fahriye Evcen in Yalancı Bahar, Tülin Özen in Cennetin Çocukları. He had films, plays in many languages.

In 2009, Elcin directed his first feature film, Kampüste Çıplak Ayaklar. He performs at various theatres.

== Filmography ==
=== Web series ===
Web series
Year	Title	Role	Note
2022	Senkron		
2022	Börü: 2039		

=== TV series ===
Tv series
Year	Title	Role	Note
2002	La Crim	Vincent Hartmann	
2005	Navarro	Le chirurgien	
2006	Kırık kanatlar	Cemal	
2006-2008	Hatırla Sevgili	Ahmet	
2008	Cennetin Çocukları	Ömer	
2010	Gönülçelen	Murat	
2011	Yalancı Bahar	Selim & Aziz	
2012	Kötü Yol	Kenan	
2015	Eve Dönüş	Yusuf Bozyel	
2017	Dayan Yüreğim	Fuat	
2018	Ağlama Anne	Adnan Alan	
2020	Sol Yanım	İhsan	
2022	Yasak Elma	Cenk	

=== Films ===
Film
Year	Title	Role	Note
1996	Irma Vep		
1999	Harem suaré	Journaliste	
2000	Route de nuit	Le medecin de garde	
2000	Le coeur à l'ouvrage	Actor (Hamlet)	
2001	L'art (délicat) de la séduction	Designer 4	
2002	A+ Pollux	A Friend	
2005	Tu vas rire, mais je te quitte		
2005	Navarro	Le chirurgien	
2006	L'équilibre de la terreur	Tarek	
2006	Küçük Kıyamet	Zeki	
2008	120	Süleyman	
2009	Kampüste Çıplak Ayaklar	Joseph Hoca /Vishnu /Shiva /Brahmi	
2009	The Watercolor	Marco	
2010	Ada: Zombilerin Düğünü	Zombi	
2011	Aşk Tesadüfleri Sever	French director	
2015	Bizim Hikaye		
2015	Là où Atilla passe…	Ahmet	
2015	Darbe	Hakan Fidan	
2015	Evlenmeden Olmaz	Yavuz	
2021	Doğum	Özer/Arif	

=== Short film ===
Short Film
Title	Year	Role	Note
Le grand avoir	2002		
Roya	2014		
Bulutlardan Aşağı	2021		

=== Screenwriter and director ===
- 2004 -Kelebek/Papillion (short film)
- 2009 -Kampüste Çıplak Ayaklar
- 2016 -Melekleri Taşıyan Adam

=== Producer ===
- Melekleri Taşıyan Adam

== Awards ==
Elçin won the Best Male TV Actor Award for his role in Hatırla Sevgili, at Beykent University Faculty of Communations, 2008 Communation Awards; which honors the year's bests as voted by the students.
