= The Gift (Turkish TV series) =

Turkish television series

- Turkish: Atiye
- Genre: Mystery; psychological thriller; science fiction
- Based on: Dünyanın Uyanışı by Şengül Boybaş
- Written by: Jason George; Nuran Evren Şit
- Directed by: Ozan Açıktan; Gönenç Uyanık; Ali Taner; Burcu Alptekin
- Starring: Beren Saat; Mehmet Günsür; Metin Akdülger; Melisa Şenolsun
- Country of origin: Turkey
- Original language: Turkish
- No. of seasons: 3
- No. of episodes: 24

Production
- Executive producers: Onur Güvenatam; Özge Bağdatlıoğlu; Jason George
- Producer: Alex Sutherland
- Production location: Göbekli Tepe
- Editors: Erhan Acar Jr; Korhan Koryurek; Aylin Tinel
- Camera setup: Single-camera
- Running time: 30-50 minutes
- Production companies: Netflix; OG Medya

Original release
- Network: Netflix
- Release: December 27, 2019 – June 17, 2021

The Gift (Turkish: Atiye) is a Turkish drama fantasy Netflix series starring Beren Saat. It was written by Jason George and Nuran Evren Şit. The first season consists of 8 episodes and became available for streaming on Netflix on December 27, 2019. The series is an adaptation of the novel Dünyanın Uyanışı (The World's Awakening) by Şengül Boybaş. The second season was released on September 10, 2020. The series was renewed for a third and final season, which premiered on June 17, 2021.

== Plot ==
Atiye is a young woman who has been drawing a fertility symbol since her childhood, without knowing the meaning attached to it. She is a part-time teacher as well as an abstract painter. She has always drawn that symbol, but never saw it anywhere other than in her own art. She is in a relationship with a man named Ozan, the son of a very wealthy businessman named Serdar, although Atiye does not find peace in her relationship. She hosts her first exhibition which showcases the same symbol she has been drawing since her childhood in different colours and sizes. All her paintings are loved by people and hence her exhibition is a success. On the same day, an archeologist named Erhan discovers something strange in Göbekli Tepe: an unusual artifact which has laid buried for millennia. Atiye recognises that it is the same symbol that she has been attached to since childhood. She makes an immediate decision to go see the symbol the next day herself. On her way there, she sees a girl with a star mark on her forehead with some cattle on the road. She asks the child for directions but she can not understand her language.

Upon hearing Göbekli Tepe, the girl understands and leads her to the site. There she meets Erhan and tells him about her association with the symbol, but he thinks either she is making up the story to get fame or has lost her mind altogether. She asks him to let her see it but he refuses, saying that it is not open for public. After her failed attempt to see the symbol, she checks in to a hotel. The girl with the star mark comes knocking on her hotel room door. She leads her to the cave and she sees purple stones; that is when Erhan and one of his crew men pull her out of the site and ask her to leave. Atiye tells Erhan that a little girl with a star mark is still inside and that there are purple stones. He does not believe her and again asks her to leave.

On the next day Erhan and his crew go further inside and sees the purple stones and a drawing of a girl with a star mark on her forehead. Erhan later contacts Atiye. Upon her return, Ozan proposes to her and she accepts. Atiye frequently sees an old woman approaching her and that scares Atiye a lot. Erhan and Atiye's fates are connected by some mysterious duty that they have towards the world, and it is up to them to find out what their purpose is meant to be... They try to find out what this is all about. That's when Erhan's father's old colleague gives him the diary and some documents that belonged to his father since he recalled the symbol Erhan discovered from his father's notes. Erhan's father left many messages for Atiye and Erhan many years ago, before the birth of Atiye, and the messages too have to be found and solved like riddles. Ozan's father Serdar Yılmaz and Erhan's ex-girlfriend Hannah work for some mysterious mafia that needs Atiye.

Season 3

Atiye and Erhan continue to search for their daughter. Seeking to reach her daughter Aden, Atiye faces a wrenching dilemma as dark forces attempt to harness Aden's cosmic powers to bring about destruction.

== Cast ==
Actor	Character
Beren Saat	Atiye Özgürsoy
Mehmet Günsür	Erhan Kurtiz
Metin Akdülger	Ozan Yılmaz
Melisa Şenolsun	Cansu Özgürsoy - Elif Kurtiz
Başak Köklükaya	Serap Özgürsoy
Civan Canova	Mustafa Özgürsoy
Tim Seyfi	Serdar Yılmaz
Meral Çetinkaya	Zühre Altın
Lara Tonka	Aden
Selma Ergeç	Umut
Fatih Al	Nazım Kurtiz
Hazal Türesan	Hannah
Selen Öztürk - Sibel Melek Arat	Seher Altın
Senan Kara	Melek Yılmaz
Cezmi Baskın	Öner

== Episodes ==
Season	Episodes	Originally released
1	8	December 27, 2019
2	8	September 10, 2020
3	8	June 17, 2021

=== Season 1 (2019) ===
No. overall	No. in season	Title	Directed by	Written by	Original release date
1	1	"Episode 1"	Ozan Açıktan	Jason George	December 27, 2019
Abstract painter Atiye crosses paths with Erhan, an archaeologist who discovered a mysterious symbol at the Göbeklitepe excavation site.
2	2	"Episode 2"	Ozan Açıktan	Nuran Evren Şit	December 27, 2019
A haunting vision torments Atiye amid wedding preparations. Erhan retrieves a clue leading to the woman who keeps appearing before Atiye.
3	3	"Episode 3"	Ozan Açıktan	Ayşin Akbulut	December 27, 2019
As Zühre's identity comes to light, Atiye suspects a deliberate cover-up. Erhan hears about a blind woman who had visited his father at Göbeklitepe.
4	4	"Episode 4"	Gönenç Uyanık	Cansu Çoban	December 27, 2019
Serdar scrambles to find Atiye, Erhan sees a vision of his family, and Zühre reveals to Atiye her calling -- and their shared mystical lineage.
5	5	"Episode 5"	Gönenç Uyanık	Nuran Evren Şit	December 27, 2019
Inside the cave, Atiye comes to terms with her past and faces her fears. Erhan rushes to find the tunnel entrance as Atiye's fate hangs by a thread.
6	6	"Episode 6"	Gönenç Uyanık	Cansu Çoban and Merih Aslan	December 27, 2019
A picture of Shahmaran confirms Erhan's suspicions. Atiye stumbles upon a shocking truth while investigating the Kurtiz family deaths.
7	7	"Episode 7"	Gönenç Uyanık	Atasay Koç	December 27, 2019
Bristling under pressure from Serdar, Ozan confronts Cansu about her attempts to confess to Atiye. A betrayal threatens to seal Atiye's fate.
8	8	"Episode 8"	Gönenç Uyanık	Nuran Evren Şit and Nergis Otluoğlu Akoğlu	December 27, 2019
In a flashback, Zühre shares with Nazim her premonitions about Atiye and Erhan. Atiye makes a fateful decision that inevitably alters reality.

=== Season 2 (2020) ===
No. overall	No. in season	Title	Directed by	Written by	Original release date
9	1	"Episode 1"	Ali Taner Baltacı	Nuran Evren Şit	September 10, 2020
Thrust into an unsettling new reality in which her existence is void, Atiye encounters a familiar face at the place where it all began.
10	2	"Episode 2"	Ali Taner Baltacı	Nuran Evren Şit and Ayşin Akbulut	September 10, 2020
Serdar orders Hannah to keep a close watch on Atiye, who soon discovers Serdar's link to Erhan's mining operation and meets a man from Erhan's past.
11	3	"Episode 3"	Ali Taner Baltacı	Nuran Evren Şit and Ali Ercivan	September 10, 2020
Atiye shows Nazim's notebook to Erhan and encounters the fertility symbol. Mustafa investigates Serap's past, and Atiye has a shocking realization.
12	4	"Episode 4"	Burcu Alptekin	Nergis Otluoğlu Akoğlu	September 10, 2020
As Ozan's fate hangs by a thread, Serdar scrambles to locate Atiye, who learns that she carries the world's only hope for a future.
13	5	"Episode 5"	Burcu Alptekin	Nuran Evren Şit and Merih Aslan	September 10, 2020
Melek begins to connect the dots, Hannah coerces Nazim into helping her find Erhan and a benevolent figure awaits Erhan and Atiye at Cappadocia.
14	6	"Episode 6"	Burcu Alptekin	Pelin Karamehmetoğlu	September 10, 2020
Serap sends Melek a signal. Seher points Atiye to the stone inscriptions that would help Erhan remember her, but Atiye's journey hits a snag.
15	7	"Episode 7"	Gökhan Tiryaki	Atasay Koç and Nuran Evren Şit	September 10, 2020
As Elif's time runs out, Serdar reveals his dark, tragic beginnings and forces Atiye to lead him to the cave's entrance.
16	8	"Episode 8"	Gökhan Tiryaki	Nuran Evren Şit	September 10, 2020
The truth behind the deaths of pregnant women comes to light. Two parallel realities intersect as Atiye fulfills her quest - at a price.

== Production ==
Filming took place in Istanbul, Göbekli Tepe, Adıyaman, Mount Nemrut, Cappadocia, Mardin, and Bursa, among other locations in Turkey.

== Reception ==
Pop culture site Decider.com's review column Stream It Or Skip It recommended The Gift as "stream it", calling the show "a good-looking series about a human’s connection to the mystical" and "ground[ed] in reality, [not] hokey or overly precious."
