= Murat Yıldırım (actor) =

Turkish actor (born 1979)

- Born: 13 April 1979 (age 47); Konya, Turkey
- Occupation: Actor
- Years active: 1999–present
- Spouse(s): Burçin Terzioğlu (m. 2008; div. 2014) Iman Elbani (m. 2016)
- Children: 2

Murat Yıldırım (born 13 April 1979) is a Turkish actor.

== Early life ==
Murat Yıldırım was born in Konya, Turkey. His father is of Kurdish origin and was a teacher of literature. Yıldırım's father speaks Turkish and Kurdish. His mother is of Arab descent and speaks Arabic as well, but Murat Yıldırım is neither fluent in Kurdish nor Arabic. Due to his father's job Yıldırım grew up between Konya and Adana. He has two sisters.

Yıldırım graduated in Mechanical Engineering from the Yıldız Technical University in Istanbul, Turkey and he has a keen interest in mathematics. His interest in music and theatre started early on in his life as well. As a student, Yıldırım played drums in a band. During his studying period he also started performing with his University's theatrical team and attending acting lessons.

== Career ==
After performing three years in theater, a writer who watched him perform in a comedy recommended him to attend a casting in Beşiktaş Cultural Center.

=== Television ===
Thus he played his first minor role in Ölümsüz Aşk which was written by Yılmaz Erdoğan. Later he performed in Bütün Çocuklarım and in Büyük Yalan. His first leading role was in the series Fırtına where he met his future first wife, Burçin Terzioğlu.

In 2007 he starred in Asi which was nominated for the International TV Audience Award-Best Drama TV Series at the 51st Monte-Carlo Television Festival alongside Tuba Büyüküstün. After the end of Asi Yıldırım agreed to act in Aşk ve Ceza alongside Nurgül Yeşilçay.

Yıldırım's next role, in 2012, was Ecevit in the hit series Suskunlar which the first Turkish drama sold to the USA market for remake alongside Aslı Enver. In middle 2015 Yıldırım signed a contract with O3 productions and MBC Group for an upcoming series, which eventually premiered in early 2016 under the title Gecenin Kraliçesi. In 2017, together with his wife Iman Elbani, he played in a music video for American singer Jessica Sutta's single, "When a Girl Loves a Boy".

From 2019 to 2021, he starred as the titular character in the crime-mafia action series Ramo, alongside co-star Esra Bilgiç. From 2021 to 2022, he shared the leading roles with Damla Sönmez in the period drama Aziz on Show TV. He currently stars as one of the lead roles in the TRT1 series Teşkilat about Mit.

=== Film ===
Yıldırım also had a brief appearance in the Turkish film Organize İşler. He got nominated for Golden Orange Award for Best Actor for his leading role in the film Araf. During the filming of Asi he starred opposite Beren Saat in the movie Güz sancisi about Istanbul pogrom. In late 2014, Yıldırım returned on screens, after a break of one a half years, portraying Lieutenant Sadık Turan in the movie Kırımlı based on the autobiographical novel Korkunç Yıllar. In 2015, he appeared as Sinan in the film adaptation of Turkey's 2014 best-selling novel Kocan Kadar Konuş. The romantic comedy was released on 20 March 2015, to positive reviews. Due to its commercial success, a sequel was announced shortly after the film's release. The sequel, named Kocan Kadar Konuş-Diriliş was released on 1 January 2016.

== Personal life ==
Yıldırım met his first wife, Burçin Terzioğlu, while filming the TV series Fırtına. They were married from 2008 to 2014. On 10 March 2016, he married former beauty pageant title holder of Morocco and actress Iman Elbani. Elbani, who was pregnant with the couple's child, suffered a miscarriage in 2019. The couple suffered another miscarriage in 2020. Elbani has suffered a total of five miscarriages. The couple welcomed their first child, a daughter, in October 2022.

== Filmography ==
Film
Year	Title	Role	Notes
2005	Organize İşler		
2006	Araf	Cenk	Main role
2009	Güz Sancısı	Behçet	Main role
2014	Kırımlı	Sadık Turan	Main role
2015	Kocan Kadar Konuş	Sinan	Main role
2016	Kocan Kadar Konuş: Diriliş	Sinan	Main role
2017	Sonsuz Aşk	Can	Main role
2017	Ayla	Mesut	
2017	İlk Öpücük	Hakan	
2018	Scorpion	Yassir	
2021	Mako	Murad	
2023	Nefes: Yer Eksi İki	Captain Tayfun	
2026	Trees Are Watching		

Television
Year	Title	Role	Notes
2003	Hayat Bilgisi		Guest
2003	Patron Kim		Guest
2003	Ölümsüz Aşk		Supporting role
2004	Bütün Çocuklarım	Mesut	Supporting role
2004	Büyük Yalan	Okan	2.Season
2006	Fırtına	Ali	Main role
2007–2009	Asi	Demir Doğan	Main role
2009	Ey Aşk Nerdesin	Police officer	Guest
2010–2011	Aşk ve Ceza	Savaş Baldar	Main role
2012	Suskunlar	Ecevit (Şerif) Oran	Main role
2016	Night Queen	Kartal	Main role
2020–2021	Ramo	Ramazan Kaya	Main role
2021–2022	Aziz	Aziz Payidar	Main role
2022–2024	Teşkilat	Ömer	Main role
2024	Gizli Bahçe	Demir Akçınar	Main role
2025–	Guller Ve Gunahlar	Serhat Tejer	Main role

Programs
Year	Title	Role	Notes
2017–2019	Kim Milyoner Olmak İster?	Presenter	
