= Levent Kazak =

Turkish screenwriter and actor (born 1967)

- Born: 5 May 1967 (age 58); Ankara, Turkey
- Occupations: Screenwriter, actor

Levent Kazak (born 5 May 1967) is a Turkish screenwriter and actor.

== Biography ==
Levent Kazak was born in Ankara in 1967. He finished Beşiktaş Atatürk High School in 1985. He studied at several universities such as Boğaziçi University (English Language and Literature Department), Mimar Sinan University (Painting Department, Sculpture Department and the Department of Theater Decoration and Costume), Marmara University Conservatory (Theater Department) and Istanbul University (Italian Language and Literature Department and Greek Language and Literature Department).

In 1986, Kazak began performing in theater professionally. He has performed on over thirty stages with famous actors like Altan Erbulak, Ali Poyrazoğlu, Alpay İzer, Bülent Kayabaş, Savaş Dinçel and İsmet Ay. In addition, Kazak has written scenarios, translated and adapted scripts.

In 1989, he prepared a TV drama Kim Bunlar with Peker Açıkalın, Nilüfer Açıkalın, Pelinsu Pir, and Levent Tülek. Kazak has also written scenarios for Children’s theaters and TV programs. In 2000, he wrote scenarios for films such as O Şimdi Asker (2000), Neredesin Firuze (2002) and O Şimdi Mahkum (2003).

In 2005, Kazak wrote scenario for the film Hacivat Karagöz Neden Öldürüldü. He won the best scenarist with this film in the 13th Altın Koza Film Festival.

Kazak is one of the founders of the Senaryo Stüdyosu.

== Works ==
Films as a screenwriter

- O Şimdi Asker, 2003
- Neredesin Firuze, 2004
- O Şimdi Mahkum, 2005
- Hacivat Karagöz Neden Öldürüldü, 2006

Films as an actor

- Yolun Sonundaki Karanlık, 1985
- Hemşo, 1999
- O Şimdi Asker, 2002
- O Şimdi Mahkum, 2003
- Hacivat Karagöz Neden Öldürüldü, 2005

Theater as an actor / screenwriter / translator

- Aş Bunları Aş, 1985
- Hamam (Steaming), 1987
- Hoşçakal İstanbul, 1988
- Seçimler, 1989
- Dünyalar, 1990
- Sevimli Hayalet Pufidik
- Babam 9 Doğurdu, 1991
- Çehov Yalta′da, 1992
- Kelebekler Özgürdür, 1993
- Çılgınlar Klübü, 1990

TV dramas as an actor / scenarist / director

- Kim Bunlar TRT, 1988
- Bol Bol Futbol TRT, 1990
- Gülen Ayva Ağlayan Nar Star, 1992

Awards
Preceded by Nilüfer Gündoğmuş; Reha Erdem	Golden Boll Award for Best Screenplay; 2006	Succeeded by Sırrı Süreyya Önder
