= Burçin Terzioğlu =

Turkish actress (born 1980)

- Born: 9 March 1980 (age 46); Istanbul, Turkey
- Occupation: Actress
- Years active: 1985–present
- Spouse: Murat Yıldırım (m. 2008; div. 2014)
- Website: burcinterzioglu.com

Burçin Terzioğlu (born 9 March 1980) is a Turkish actress.

== Life and career ==
Her family works in the cinema industry. Terzioğlu began acting at the age of five as a child actress, appearing in 45 films and 16 television series until the age of ten. She later studied acting at the Müjdat Gezen Arts Center. She played in numerous hit series and films since childhood. Her first popular adult role was in the hit revenge series "Kadın İsterse". She won Golden Butterfly Best Actress Award for Poyraz Karayel. She played adult and young versions of her role Deniz in series Merhamet based on novel which won Golden Butterfly Best Music Award.

Terzioğlu was married to her Fırtına co-star Murat Yıldırım from 2008 to 2014.

== Filmography ==
=== Movies ===
Year	Title	Role	Notes
1985	Patron Duymasın		
1985	Çıplak Vatandaş	İbrahim's daughter	
1986	Hasretinle Yaşanmıyor	Burçin	
1986	İki Milyarlık Bilet	Gül	
1986	Yıkılmışım Ben		
1987	Baba Yüreği	Aslı	
1987	Bir Çember Kırılırken	Sinem	
1987	Menekşeler Mavidir		
1987	Hayallerim, Aşkım ve Sen	Rukiye	
1988	Izdırap Çocukları		
1989	Fazilet	Fazilet's daughter	
1991	Menekşe Koyu	Ayşe	
1994	İki Küçük Yaramaz		
1996	Cinayet Masası		
2000	Annem ve Ben	Gül	
2000	Oyun Bitti		
2003	Taştan Kalp	Özlem	
2014	Halam Geldi	Benek	Leading role
2019	Güzelliğin Portresi	Nisan	Leading role

=== Web series ===
Year	Title	Role	Notes
2018–20	Hakan: Muhafız	Rüya Erdem	Joined
2021	Hükümsüz	Esma Öztürk	Leading role
2023	Sarmaşık Zamanı	Ezgi	Leading role
2024	Asaf	Sema	Leading role

=== TV series ===
Year	Title	Role	Notes
1986–88	Perihan Abla		
1987	Yeniden Doğmak		
1989	Doktorlar	Billur	
1992	Kavak Ailesi	Fındık Yeğen	
1993	Solan Gül	Gülten	
1993	Firar		
1996	Kır Çiçekleri		
1997	Yasemince		
1997	Hatıralar		
1998	Sırılsıklam		
1998.. ever	...	...	...
1997-2000	Mahallenin Muhtarları	Simge	Joined
1999	Tirvana		Guest
2000	Yılan Hikâyesi	Azat	Guest
2001	Güz Gülleri	Nuray	Supporting role
2002	Deli Boran Destanı		Guest
2002	Anne Babamla Evlensene		Guest
2002	Çiçek Taksi	Sinem	Guest
2002	Üzgünüm Leyla	İshak's lover	Guest
2002-2004	Kınalı Kar	Pınar Beyoğlu	Supporting role
2004	Melekler Adası	Ceren	Joined
2004	Aliye	Ümit	Guest
2004–06	Kadın İsterse	Demet	Supporting role
2006	Fırtına	Zeynep Dalcı	Leading role
2007	Çemberin Dışında	Laçin Sürmen	Leading role
2009	Ey Aşk Nerdesin?	Zeliş (Zeliha Yılmaz)	Leading role
2010–11	Ezel	Azad Karaeski Kırgız	Joined
2013–14	Merhamet	Deniz Tunalı	Leading role
2015–17	Poyraz Karayel	Ayşegül Umman	Leading role
2019	Kurşun	Leyla Devrim	Leading role
2020	Menajerimi Ara	Herself	Guest
2021	Yalancı	Deniz Sungur	Leading role

== Awards and nominations ==
Year	Award	Category	Work	Result
2015	YBTB Top Awards of the Year	Most Successful TV Series Actress	Poyraz Karayel	Won
2015	4. Crystal Mouse Media Awards	Best Actress	Poyraz Karayel	Nominated
2015	42. Pantene Golden Butterfly Awards	Best Actress	Poyraz Karayel	Nominated
2015	6. İMK Social Media Awards	Best Actress	Poyraz Karayel	Nominated
2015	Haliç University 2015's Top Awards	Best TV Actress of the Year	Poyraz Karayel	Won
2016	2. Elele Avon Woman Awards	Actress of the Year	Poyraz Karayel	Won
2016	23. İTÜ EMÖS Achievement Awards	Most Successful TV Actress of the Year	Poyraz Karayel	Nominated
2016	5. TURKMSIC Bests of the Year Awards	Best Actress of the Year	Poyraz Karayel	Won
2016	2. Turkey Youth Awards	Best TV Actress	Poyraz Karayel	Nominated
2016	7. KTÜ Media Awards	Most Liked Actress	Poyraz Karayel	Nominated
2016	11. İTÜ Makinistanbul Media, Art and Sport Awards	Best TV Actress	Poyraz Karayel	Won
2016	Ege University 5. Media Awards	Best TV Actress	Poyraz Karayel	Nominated
2016	Sabancı University Media Club 3. Navy Blue Awards	Actress of the Year	Poyraz Karayel	Won
2016	3. Mersin Golden Palm Awards	TV Actress of the Year	Poyraz Karayel	Nominated
2016	1. YBU Media Awards	Best TV Actress	Poyraz Karayel	Nominated
2016	10. GSUEN Awards	Best TV/Cinema Actress	Poyraz Karayel	Nominated
2016	Gazi University 9. Academy Career Days Awards	Best Actress of the Year	Poyraz Karayel	Won
2016	MGD 22. Golden Lens Awards	Best Drama Actress	Poyraz Karayel	Won
2016	6. Ayaklı Ayaklı Newspaper TV Stars Awards	Best Detective TV Series Actress	Poyraz Karayel	Won
2016	43. Pantene Golden Butterfly Awards	En İyi Kadın Oyuncu	Poyraz Karayel	Won
2016	43. Pantene Golden Butterfly Awards	Best TV Couple (Ayşegül & Poyraz)	Poyraz Karayel	Nominated
2016	Poltio.com TV Survey Awards	Most Successful Actress	Poyraz Karayel	Won
2016	7. İMK Social Media Awards	Best Actress	Poyraz Karayel	Won
2017	15. YTÜ Stars of the Year Awards	Most Liked Series-Movie Actress	Poyraz Karayel	Won
2017	5. Bilkent TV Awards	Best Drama Actress	Poyraz Karayel	Nominated
2017	1. Müzikonair Awards	Best TV Actress	Poyraz Karayel	Nominated
2017	24. İTÜ EMÖS Achievement Awards	Most Successful TV Actress of the Year	Poyraz Karayel	Won
2017	6. TURKMSIC Bests of the Year Awards	Best Actress of the Year	Poyraz Karayel	Nominated
2017	8. KTÜ Media Awards	Most Liked Actress	Poyraz Karayel	Nominated
2017	8. KTÜ Media Awards	Most Liked TV Couple (Ayşegül & Poyraz)	Poyraz Karayel	Nominated
2017	11. GSUEN Awards	Best TV/Cinema Actress	Poyraz Karayel	Won
2017	Yeditepe University 5. Wish Awards	Best Actress	Poyraz Karayel	Won
2017	3. Turkey Youth Awards	Best TV Actress	Poyraz Karayel	Nominated
2017	Atatürk University 1. Akıl Fikir Club Awards	Best Actress	Poyraz Karayel	Nominated
2017	İKÜ 1. Career Honorary Awards	Most Liked TV Actress	Poyraz Karayel	Won
2017	Istanbul University 1453 Awards	Best TV/Film Actress of the Year	Poyraz Karayel	Nominated
2017	Akdeniz University Media Success Awards	Most Liked TV Actress	Poyraz Karayel	Won
2017	44. Pantene Golden Butterfly Awards	Best Actress	Poyraz Karayel	Nominated
2017	44. Pantene Golden Butterfly Awards	Best TV Couple (Ayşegül & Poyraz)	Poyraz Karayel	Nominated
2020	3. International İzmir Artemis Film Festival	Best Supporting Actress in a Web Series	Hakan: Muhafız	Won

== TV survey achievements and nominations ==
Year	Award	Category	Work	Result
2016	Gecce.com Year -End TV Survey Awards	Best Actress of 2015	Poyraz Karayel	Nominated
2016	Gecce.com Year -End TV Survey Awards	Best Tv Couple of 2015 (Ayşegül & Poyraz)	Poyraz Karayel	Won
2016	Noluyo.tv Year-End Surveys	Best Actress of 2015	Poyraz Karayel	Nominated
2016	Noluyo.tv Year-End Surveys	Best TV Couple of 2015 (Ayşegül & Poyraz)	Poyraz Karayel	Nominated
2017	Gecce.com Year-End TV Survey Awards	Best Actress of 2016	Poyraz Karayel	Nominated
2017	Gecce.com Year-End TV Survey Awards	Best TV Couple of 2016 (Ayşegül & Poyraz)	Poyraz Karayel	Nominated
2017	Noluyo.tv Year -End Surveys	Best Actress of 2016	Poyraz Karayel	Nominated
2017	Noluyo.tv Year -End Surveys	Best TV Couple of 2016 (Ayşegül & Poyraz)	Poyraz Karayel	Nominated
2017	Valentine Day's Symbol Couple Survey Awards	Symbolic Couple of the Year (Burçin & İlker)	Poyraz Karayel	Won
2017	Poltio.com TV Survey Awards	Most Liked Couple (Burçin & İlker)	Poyraz Karayel	Won
