= Benim Dünyam =

2013 film by Uğur Yücel

- Film poster
- Directed by: Uğur Yücel
- Written by: Ugras Günes, Can Yücel
- Produced by: Erol Avci
- Starring: Beren Saat; Uğur Yücel
- Release date: 25 October 2013
- Running time: 100 minutes
- Country: Turkey
- Language: Turkish

Benim Dünyam (My World) is a 2013 Turkish drama film directed by Uğur Yücel. It is the remake of the 2005 Indian film, Black which in turn was inspired by the true story of American political activist and lecturer Helen Keller, who was taught to read, write and speak, despite her condition as a deafblind.

The remade in Turkish as Benim Dünyam (2013), which generated controversy in the media. On 5 September, when TMC Films released its trailer, Bhansali sent e-mails to the production company as no remake rights had been purchased, but they did not provide any response.

== Cast ==
- Beren Saat as Ela
- Uğur Yücel as Mahir Hoca
- Ayça Bingöl as Handan
- Melis Mutluç
- Turgay Kantürk as Refik
