= İntikam =

2013 Turkish primetime drama television series

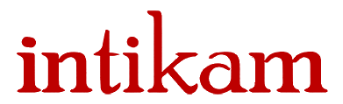
- Genre: Soap opera Drama; Psychological thriller Mystery; Serial drama
- Created by: Mike Kelley
- Based on: Revenge by Mike Kelley The Count of Monte Cristo by Alexandre Dumas
- Starring: Beren Saat; Başak Daşman; Yiğit Özşener; Mert Fırat; Zafer Algöz; Arzu Gamze Kılınç; Engin Hepileri; Başak Daşman; Burak Davutoğlu; Alican Yücesoy; Ezgi Eyüboğlu
- Theme music composer: Atakan Ilgazdağ
- Country of origin: Turkey
- Original language: Turkish
- No. of seasons: 2
- No. of episodes: 44

Production
- Executive producer: Mike Kelley
- Running time: 90 minutes
- Production companies: İnD House in association with ABC Studios; D Productions; ABC Studios

Original release
- Network: Kanal D
- Release: January 3, 2013 – February 20, 2014

Related
- Venganza; Revenge

İntikam (transl. Revenge) is a Turkish primetime drama television series that aired on Kanal D, starring Beren Saat and Yiğit Özşener. It debuted on January 3, 2013. İntikam is the Turkish version of the ABC TV series Revenge created by Mike Kelley. The plot is inspired by Alexandre Dumas' 1844 novel The Count of Monte Cristo.

== Overview ==
Yağmur Özden moves to a yalı in a rich neighborhood on the shore of the Bosphorus in Istanbul. Her real name is Derin Çelik. Her father, Adil was framed for a crime he didn't commit and sent to prison. Derin was sent to an orphanage and believed that her father was guilty. Adil wanted his daughter to learn the truth and kept a diary to be given to her. Derin learned the truth about her father when she was 18. But it was too late. He died in jail as an innocent man. Derin comes to her childhood neighborhood with a different identity to seek revenge against the people who betrayed her father.

== Cast and characters ==
=== Main cast ===
Actor	Character	Season	
Actor	Character	1	2
Beren Saat	Yağmur Özden/Derin Çelik	Main	Main
Başak Daşman	Derin Çelik/Yağmur Özden	Main	Main
Nejat İşler	Rüzgar Denizci	Main	
Yiğit Özşener	Rüzgar Denizci		Main
Mert Fırat	Emre Arsoy	Main	Main
Arzu Gamze Kılınç	Şahika Arsoy	Main	Main
Zafer Algöz	Haldun Arsoy	Main	Main
Engin Hepileri	Hakan Eren	Main	Main
Ezgi Eyüboğlu	Cemre Arsoy	Main	Main
Dilşat Çelebi	Aslı Sağlam	Main	
Zeynep Özder	Aslı Sağlam		Main
Burak Davutoğlu	Adil Çelik	Main	
Can Sipahi	Barış Denizci	Main	Main

== Seasons ==
Season	Originally aired				
Season	Timeslot	Season premiere	Season finale	Episodes	TV season
1	Thursday 20.00	January 3, 2013	June 6, 2013	22	2012-2013
2	Thursday 20.00	September 12, 2013	February 20, 2014	22	2013-2014

== General Manager ==
- Giovanni Mastrangelo

== International broadcasts ==
Country	Network	Premiere date
Arab World	OSN First (Pay-per-view)	April 22, 2013
Pakistan	GEO Kahani	September 14, 2013
Croatia	RTL	October, 2013
Greece	Mega	January 20, 2014
Serbia	AXN Spin	April 3, 2017
Bulgaria	AXN White	April 19, 2017
Romania	AXN White	April 19, 2017
Russia	Sony Channel Россия	November 20, 2017
Chile	Mega	February 15, 2021
