= Yavuz Bingöl =

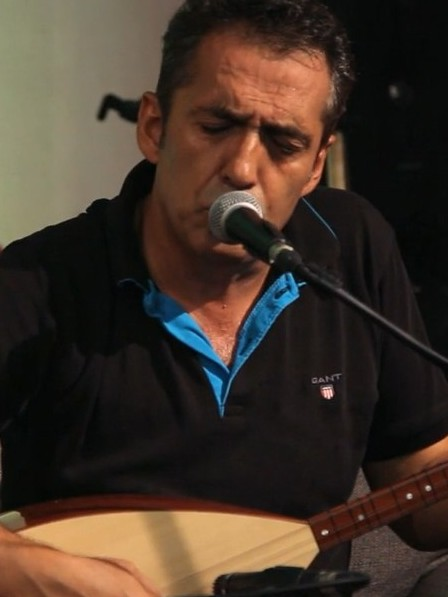

Background information
- Born: 7 October 1964 (age 61); Istanbul, Turkey
- Genres: Turkish folk
- Occupations: Musician, actor
- Years active: 1995–present
- Website: www.yavuzbingol.com.tr

Yavuz Bingöl (born 7 October 1964) is a Turkish folk music artist and actor.

== Early life ==
Bingöl was born in Istanbul, Turkey in 1964 to teacher Yılmaz Bingöl and folk singer Senem Akkaş (better known by her stage name Şahsenem Bacı), both hailing from Sarıkamış district.

== Music career ==
Bingöl enrolled at the Ankara State Conservatory in 1977, influence by his mother, but following his parents' divorce, he left the Conservatory in 1979 and moved to İzmir where his mother settled and started to work in menial jobs to support his family. He returned to music in 1983 and founded, with his friend Nihat Aydın, the protest music band Atmacalar in 1989. The band changed its name to Umuda Ezgi in 1991. Bingöl left the band in 1995 and released his first solo album Sen Türkülerini Söyle the same year.

== Acting career ==
Bingöl was in several miniseries on Turkish TV, including Bayanlar Baylar, Ah Be İstanbul and Yanık Koza. He also did the romance series Zerda and the sitcom Eşref Saati. His 2008 films made both great success: Üç Maymun premiered in competition at the 2008 Cannes Film Festival, where its director Nuri Bilge Ceylan won the Award for Best Director. Bingöl's another film, released into English, He's in the Army Now was nominated for best Turkish film at the Istanbul International Film Festival.

== Personal life ==
Bingöl announced his fourth marriage with pop music singer Öykü Gürman (b. 1982) in 2014 and the couple married on 4 August 2015.

Bingöl has a daughter named Türkü Sinem (b. 1988) from his first marriage. She is studying in the United States and working as a fashion model.

== Filmography ==
- Teşkilat (2021) - Adem Seyhan
- Sevda Kuşun Kanadında (2016) - Zafer Erbay
- Aşk Zamanı (2015) - Orhan
- Aşk Sana Benzer (2015) - Yusuf Baba
- Karagül (2013–2015) - Fırat Mercan
- Çanakkale Çocukları (2012)
- Bulutların Ötesi (2012) - Bekir Aksu
- Mevsim Çiçek Açtı (2012)
- İstanbul (2011) - Halil
- Yangın Var (2011) - Diyarbakır Mayor
- 72. Koğuş (2011) - Kaptan
- Kurtuluş Son Durak (2011) - Hüseyin
- Ateşe Yürümek (2010) - Fikret
- Gecenin Kanatları (2009) - Ali Rıza
- Üç Maymun (2008) - Eyüp
- Eşref Saati (2007–2008) - Kara Eşref
- Beyaz Melek (2007) - Hıdır
- Eve Dönüş (2006)
- O Şimdi Mahkum (2005) - Karlıdağ
- Yanık Koza (2005) - Galip Çelebi
- Ah Be İstanbul (2004) - Metin
- Zerda (2002) - Şahin Eroğlu
- Bayanlar Baylar (2002) - Ozan
- O Şimdi Asker (2002) - Karlıdağ
- Salkım Hanımın Taneleri (1999) - Asker
- Cumhuriyet (1998) - Yahya Hayati Bey

== Discography ==
- Gün Işımış (with Atmacalar, 1990) Ezgi Müzik
- Örgütlemişler Baharı (with Umuda Ezgi, 1991) Ezgi Müzik
- Ateş Dağları Sarmış (with Umuda Ezgi, 1993) Ezgi Müzik
- Onların Türküsü (with Umuda Ezgi, 1995) Ada Müzik
- Sen Türkülerini Söyle (1995) Ada Müzik
- Baharım Sensin (1997) Ada Müzik
- Gülen Az (1998) Prestij Müzik
- Sitemdir (1999) Prestij Müzik
- Üşüdüm Biraz (2000) Sony
- Umuda Ezgi'ler... (with Nihat Aydın, 2000) Ada Müzik
- Belki Yine Gelirsin (2002) Sony
