= Hatırla Sevgili =

- Genre: Historical, Drama, Romantic
- Written by: Şebnem Çitak; Nilgün Öneş
- Directed by: Ümmü Burhan; Faruk Teber
- Starring: Beren Saat; Cansel Elçin
- Theme music composer: Kemal Sahir Gürel; Hüseyin Yıldız; Erdal Güney
- Country of origin: Turkey
- Original language: Turkish
- No. of seasons: 2
- No. of episodes: 68

Production
- Producer: Fatmanur Sevinç
- Running time: 90 minutes (up to 120 minutes with commercials)

Original release
- Network: ATV Turkey
- Release: October 27, 2006 – June 6, 2008

Hatırla Sevgili (Remember, Darling) was a popular but controversial Turkish TV series. The series started on October 27, 2006 on the Turkish TV channel ATV, aired on Friday evenings at 22:15 hrs local time. After 68 episodes, the final one was aired on June 6, 2008. It has the spin-off series Bu Kalp Seni Unutur mu?.

== Plot ==
The series goes over 3 periods in Turkish political history, 1959-1962, 1966-1972, and 1977-1980.

The series tells the story of the love between Yasemin and Ahmet, two young people from opposing families, and the relationship between their relatives and friends in the political era starting at the end of the 1950s in Turkey. In the background, historical events are depicted, beginning with Prime Minister Adnan Menderes' 1959 plane crash survival followed by the 1960 military coup, the Yassıada trials, the executions and other important incidents that generated the radical political polarization of Turkish society afterwards.

Yasemin and Ahmet's fathers, Rıza and Şevket, who are childhood friends and neighbors, develop opposite political views as they grow up. Rıza becomes a member of the right wing Democratic Party and enters parliament while Şevket, a public prosecutor, is a follower of the leftist Republican People's Party. Riza's older daughter Yasemin falls in love with Şevket's son Ahmet, however, their families do not allow them to marry and force them to separate. Things become complicated when Yasemin discovers that she is carrying Ahmet's baby. Their mutual friend Necdet tries to help Yasemin by offering to marry her and pretending to be the father of the baby.

The unconsummated marriage between Yasemin and Necdet forces Yasemin and Ahmet apart. During their separation, Necdet's act of kindness takes on a new role as he begins to fall in love with Yasemin. Her feelings for Necdet become complicated because her heart still belongs to Ahmet. Years later Yasemin and Ahmet meet by chance again on a train. Ahmet meets Rüya, Yasemin's daughter, and wishes she were his own daughter. Ahmet tries to reconcile with Yasemin when he discovers how both families intervened to split them up but Yasemin refuses. He suggests she runs away with him but she cannot betray Necdet after all he has done for her. So Ahmet carries on alone, later becoming engaged to Ayla and working as a teacher in the same university in which Yasemin is teaching Arts. At the end of the first season Ahmet discovers that he is the father of Yasemin's daughter Rüya; he feels betrayed and disappointed by Yasemin, and sues Yasemin and Necdet to get custody of his daughter. During the trial, many truths are discovered which attenuate Ahmet's anger.

As the series proceeds various dramatic events take place, in Turkey and in the lives of the characters. The political history of Turkey from 1971 to the military coup in 1980 is portrayed, from the point of view of the two families, who eventually resolve their differences.

== Cast ==
=== Family of Yasemin ===
- Beren Saat – Yasemin Ünsal, female lead
- Engin Şenkan – Rıza Ünsal, father of Yasemin, former barber, Democrat Party politician
- Lale Mansur – Nezahat Ünsal, mother of Yasemin
- Ayfer Dönmez – Işık Ünsal, sister of Yasemin, marries Yaşar
- Turgay Aydın – Mehmet Karayel, brother of Nezahat and uncle of Yasemin and Işık, former Turkish Army officer during the 1960 Turkish coup d'état and journalist, married to Sevim Gürsoy
- Berk Hakman – Deniz Karayel, Mehmet's son

=== Family of Ahmet ===
- Cansel Elçin – Ahmet Gürsoy, male lead
- Avni Yalçın – Şevket Gürsoy, father of Ahmet and Defne, public prosecutor, deceased.
- Ayda Aksel – Dr. Selma Gürsoy, mother of Ahmet and Defne, physician
- Belçim Bilgin – Defne Gürsoy, sister of Ahmet
- Laçin Ceylan – Sevim Gürsoy, sister of Şevked and aunt of Ahmet and Defne, journalist, married to Mehmet Karayel
- Karina Selin Gükrer – Rüya Gürsoy, daughter of Ahmet and Yasemin (age 4)
- Asena Taşkın – Rüya Gürsoy, daughter of Ahmet and Yasemin (age 9)
- Ezgi Asaroğlu – Rüya Gürsoy, daughter of Ahmet and Yasemin (age 17)

=== Family of Necdet ===
- Okan Yalabık – Necdet Aygün, first husband of Yasemin, patisserie owner, parliamentarian for CHP (People's Republican Party – in Turkish: Cumhuriyet Halk Partisi)
- Meltem Parlak – Lâle Aygün, sister of Necdet
- Erdoğan Sıcak – Hasan Aygün, father of Necdet and Lâle, patisserie owner
- Nurhayat Boz Yarpuz – Dilşad Aygün, mother of Necdet and Lâle

=== Historical figures ===
- Hüseyin Avni Danyal – Adnan Menderes, executed former Turkish prime minister
- Serap Aksoy – Berin Menderes, wife of Adnan Menderes
- Oğuz Okul – Albay Tarık Güryay, colonel, commandant of Yassıada
- Barış Koçak – Deniz Gezmiş, leftist militant, executed
- Saygın Soysal – Recep Tayyip Erdoğan, Current Turkish President
- İhsan Duduoğlu – Necip Fazıl, poet
- Oğuz Turgut Genç – Hüseyin İnan, leftist militant, executed
- Murat Zubi – Yusuf Aslan, leftist militant, executed
- Erol Alpsoykan – Emin Kalafat, former Democratic Party politician.
- Kanbolat Görkem Arslan – Mahir Çayan, leader of the THKP-C – Turkish People's Liberation Party-Front (Turkish: Türkiye Halk Kurtuluş Partisi-Cephesi), killed in Kızıldere
- Emre Korkmaz – Cihan Alptekin, leftist militant, one of the leaders of the THKO – Turkish People's Liberation Army (Turkish: Türkiye Halk Kurtuluş Ordusu), killed in Kızıldere
- Engin Gürman – Celal Bayar, former prime minister of Turkey and Third President of The Republic of Turkey
- Ahmet Karakman – Salim Başol, Headjudge of Yassıada
- Savaş Dinçel – İsmet İnönü, former prime minister and Second President of The Republic of Turkey, former leader of CHP
- ? – Harun Karadeniz, leftist militant
- İlhami Adsal – Kemal Kurdaş, former president of METU
- Çetin Demir – Sinan Cemgil, leftist militant, one of the leaders of the THKO – Turkish People's Liberation Army (Turkish: Türkiye Halk Kurtuluş Ordusu), killed in Nurhak
- Orhan Ayça – Halit Çelenk, lawyer of Gezmiş, Aslan and İnan
- Levent Akkök – Mustafa Yalçıner, leftist militant, one of the leaders of the THKO – Turkish People's Liberation Army (Turkish: Türkiye Halk Kurtuluş Ordusu), wounded and arrested in Nurhak
- Murat Eken – Yusuf Küpeli, leftist militant
- Ercan Tulunay – Mustafa Pehlivanoğlu, rightist militant, executed after 12th September coup d'état
- Tolga Güleç – Necdet Adalı, leftist militant, executed after 12th September coup d'état
- ? – Avni Yalçın, actor, also playing character "Şevket Gürsoy" in same TV serial

=== Some minor roles ===
- Şahnaz Çakıralp – Keriman Kızıltan, lover of Rıza, night club singer
- Kadir Özdal – Harun Karagöl, Deniz's friend from Galatasaray High School, romantically involved with Işık, whom he marries soon
- Umut Kurt – Yaşar Çiftçioğlu, Harun's childhood fiend, marries and divorces Işık, right-wing academist and journalist
- Emre Özcan – Teodolos, a.k.a. Teo, a Turk of Greek origin, Necdet's close friend and business partner, romantically involved with Lale, whom he marries
- Feride Çetin – Güzide, trained pastry cook, marries Necdet
- Lale Yavaş – Zeynep, a student of Ahmet's
- Alp Eren Khamis – Mehmet Sinan Karayel, son of Deniz Karayel and Defne Gürsoy Karayel, grandson of Mehmet Karayel
- ? – Metin Kurtuluş, rightist militant, friend of Yaşar

== Reception ==
Hatırla Sevgili became one of the most popular and most controversial TV series in Turkey. Books about the historical periods portrayed and people mentioned in the series became bestsellers for at least two weeks after the episodes about them were aired.
