= Istanbul Beykent University =

University in Istanbul, Turkey

Coordinates: 40°59′10″N 29°03′13″E

- İstanbul Beykent Üniversitesi
- Seal of Istanbul Beykent University
- Motto: İşte Gelecek
- Motto in English: The Future Is Now
- Type: Private (Non-profit)
- Established: 1997; 29 years ago
- Founder: Adem Çelik-Beykent Educational Foundation
- Affiliations: Beykent Educational Institutions; Bologna Process; Erasmus Exchange Programme; TÜBİTAK; YÖK
- Chairman: Dr. Erkan Çelik
- Chancellor: Prof. Dr. Volkan Öngel
- Vice-Chancellor: Prof. Dr. Hamparsun Hampikyan; Prof. Dr. Yalçın Kırdar; Prof. Dr. Günay Deniz Dursun
- Students: 30,000
- Location: Istanbul, Turkey
- Campus: Urban Sarıyer-Ayazağa Campus Taksim Campus Beylikdüzü Campus Hadımköy Campus
- University Press: Beykent University Press
Colours
Yellow, black and turquoise
- Mascot: Beykent Compass
- Website: www.beykent.edu.tr

Istanbul Beykent University (Turkish: İstanbul Beykent Üniversitesi) is a private non-profit university in Istanbul, Turkey, offering instruction in English and Turkish, with approximately 30,000 students.

Beykent University participates in the Erasmus Programme and has agreements with several European universities for student exchange between Turkey and European institutions. The university is a member of the Caucasus University Association.

== History ==
Beykent University is a foundation university with public legal entity status, established by the Adem Çelik–Beykent Educational Foundation on 9 July 1997 under Law No. 4282. Adem Çelik, the founder of Beykent University, established several educational institutions ranging from kindergarten to secondary level before founding the university.

The university began its activities on the Büyükçekmece Campus in the 1997–1998 academic year and currently operates four campuses located in central districts of Istanbul.

Istanbul Beykent University men's volleyball team won the First League Volleyball Tournament organized by the Turkish University Sports Federation between 18 and 29 March 2013.

== Academics ==
=== Faculties and departments ===
- Faculty of Science and Literature: English Language and Literature, History, Psychology, Sociology, Translation and Interpreting (in English), Translation and Interpreting (in Russian), Turkish Language and Literature
- Faculty of Economics and Administrative Sciences: Banking and Finance, Business Administration, Economics, International Relations, International Logistics and Transportation, International Trade, Management Information Systems, Tourism Management, Political Science and Public Administration
- Faculty of Engineering and Architecture: Architecture, Chemical Engineering, Civil Engineering, Computer Engineering, Electronics and Communication Engineering, Energy System Engineering, Industrial Engineering, Interior Architecture, Management Engineering, Mechanical Engineering, Software Engineering
- Faculty of Law
- Faculty of Fine Arts: Acting, Art Management and Performing Arts, Cinema and TV, Communication and Design, Graphic Design, Textile and Design
- Faculty of Communication: New Media, Public Relations and Advertising, Television Reporting and Programming, Visual Communication
- Faculty of Medicine
- Faculty of Dentistry
- School of Applied Sciences: Capital Market and Portfolio Management, Gastronomy and Culinary Arts, Industrial Design
- School of Foreign Languages
- School of Health Services: Child Development, Social Services, Audiology, Nursing

=== Graduate schools ===
- Institute of Social Sciences
- Institute of Science and Engineering

== Campuses ==
=== Beylikdüzü Campus ===
The Beykent Büyükçekmece Beylikdüzü Campus is located in Istanbul’s Büyükçekmece district, within the residential area of Beykent. The 12-story building is situated near the Beylikdüzü Life Center, healthcare institutions, and the Tüyap Exhibition Center.

The 16,000 m² enclosed educational complex includes modern classrooms, laboratories, workshop studios, an auditorium, and a cultural center. The campus also features outdoor sports facilities and a swimming pool shared with Beykent College students.

The campus primarily accommodates the Vocational School, which offers 38 programs, with 23 in the daytime and 15 in the evening to support working students. The Vocational School began operations in the 2005–2006 academic year. The newly established Faculty of Communication also moved into the building for the 2008–2009 academic year.

=== Ayazağa-Maslak Campus ===
The Ayazağa-Maslak Campus is located in the Sarıyer district of Istanbul. The campus opened in the 2005–2006 academic year with a capacity for 8,000 students and primarily serves undergraduate programs. By 2011, following building improvements, the campus capacity increased to 12,000 students.

=== Taksim Campus ===
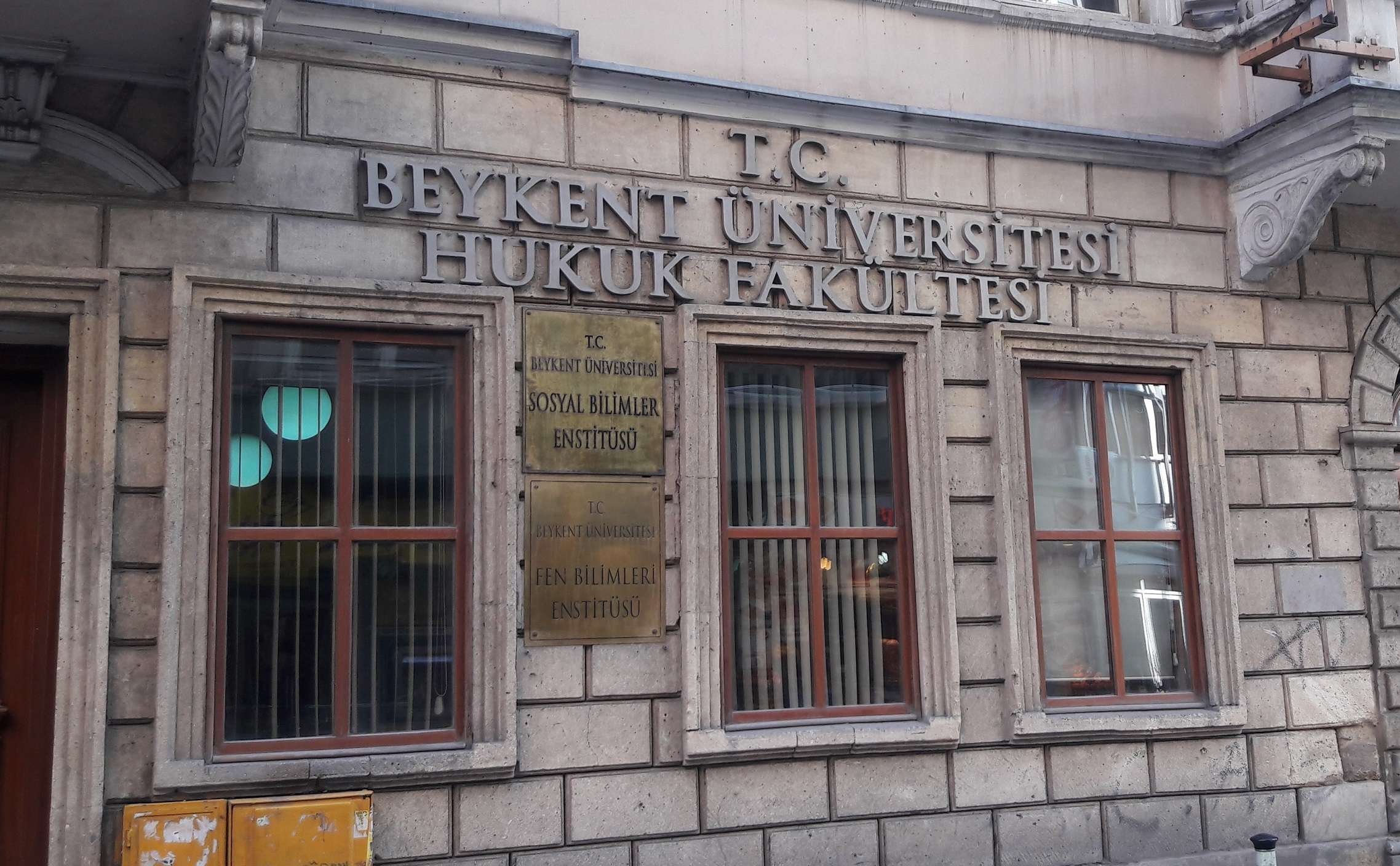
Beykent University Faculty of Law

The Taksim Campus occupies a 5,000 m² building that opened in 2004. The campus houses the Social Sciences Institute, where most postgraduate programs are conducted. The Faculty of Law is also located in this building and began teaching in the 2008–2009 academic year.

In the 2008–2009 academic year, the Taksim Campus also launched a distance learning program offering two two-year programs. The building serves as the headquarters for the Beykent University Atatürk Research and Applied Sciences Center and the Beykent University Strategic Research Center.

== Notable faculty ==
- Ahmet Davutoğlu — Former Prime Minister of Turkey; professor at Beykent University from 1999 to 2004, serving as Head of the Department of International Relations, member of the University Senate, and member of the Board of Management
- Ömer Dinçer — Former Minister of National Education of Turkey; professor at Beykent University from 1999 to 2003, serving as Dean of the Faculty of Economics and Administrative Sciences, Director of the Institute of Social Sciences, and Vice Chancellor

== See also ==
- List of universities in Turkey
