= Tomris Giritlioğlu =

Turkish film director and producer (1957–2024)

- Born: 1957; Kadınhanı, Turkey
- Died: 23 September 2024 (aged 67)
- Occupations: Film director Producer
- Years active: 1989–2024

Tomris Giritlioğlu (1957 – 23 September 2024) was a Turkish film director and producer, who directed the 1999 film Mrs. Salkım's Diamonds.

== Early life and education ==
Giritlioğlu was born in 1957 in Kadınhanı, Konya, and educated at TED Ankara College and the Department of English Language and Literature at Hacettepe University.

== Career ==
After graduating, Giritlioğlu began working for Turkish Radio and Television Corporation (TRT), initially as a translator before becoming an assistant producer in the Departments of Children's Programmes and Educational and Cultural Programmes. She then transferred to the Documentary Department, where she directed her first films, before moving to TRT's Drama Department as a general coordinator in 1988. She retired from TRT in 2002 and began working as a freelance filmmaker.

== Personal life and death ==
Giritlioğlu married TRT News Department Head Aycan Giritlioğlu in 1977. The couple had one son, Ilgaz.

She died from cancer on 23 September 2024, at the age of 67.

== Selected filmography ==
Year	Title	Role	Notes
1985	Ahmet Muhip Dranas	Director	Documentary
1986	Tabletten Kasete	Director	Documentary
1988,	İşte Beyoğlu	Director	Documentary
1989	Kantodan Tangoya	Director/Screenwriter	Fipresci prize, First Film Festival International Competition
1991	Suyun Öte Yanı (The Other Side of Water)	Director	Best Director, Jury prize, Istanbul Film Festival; Second Film prize, Best Director jury prize, Best Actress, Ankara Film Festival; Jury prize, Nantes Film Festival
1993	Yaz Yağmuru (Summer Rain)	Director/Screenwriter	Second Film prize, Film Festival Cologne; Second Film prize, SİYAD; Best Art Director, Ankara Film Festival
1995	80. Adım (The 80th Step)	Director	Best Director, Turkish Film of the Year, Istanbul Film Festival; Jury prize, Ankara Film Festival; Best Actress, Film Festival Cologne
1997	Kördüğüm	Director	
1999	Salkım Hanımın Taneleri (Mrs. Salkim's Diamonds)	Director	Best Film, Best Actor, Best Music, Best Editing, Best Art Director, International Antalya Altın Portakal Film Festival; Mahmut Tali Öngören Special Award, Ankara Film Festival
2002	Aşk Meydan Savaşı	Producer	
2005	Aşka Sürgün	Producer	
2006	Esir Kalpler	Producer	
2007	Asi	Producer	
2008	Güz Sancısı (Pains of Autumn)	Director	
2009	Bu Kalp Seni Unutur Mu?	Producer	
2009	Kasaba	Producer	
