= Yılmaz Karakoyunlu =

Turkish politician (1936–2024)

Member of the Grand National Assembly
- In office 8 January 1996 – 1 October 2002

Minister of State
- In office 5 June 2001 – 18 November 2002
- Prime Minister: Bülent Ecevit

Personal details
- Born: 26 April 1936
- Died: 11 February 2024 (aged 87)
- Party: Motherland Party; Republican People's Party

Yılmaz Karakoyunlu (26 April 1936 – 11 February 2024) was a Turkish writer and politician. He served as minister of state of Turkey from 2001 to 2002.

Born on 26 April 1936, Karakoyunlu died on 11 February 2024, at the age of 87. He was buried at the Zincirlikuyu Cemetery in Istanbul.
