= Menderes Samancılar =

Turkish actor

- Born: 1 May 1954 (age 71); Adana, Turkey
- Occupation: Actor
- Years active: 1974–present

Menderes Samancılar (born 1 May 1954) is a Turkish actor of Kurdish origin.

== Life and career ==
Samancılar was born on 1 May 1954 in Adana and is of Kurdish descent. He won the first prize in a photonovel competition organized by a newspaper in 1974. He starred in more than twenty photonovels within two years. He made his cinematic debut in 1975 with a role in Yılmaz Duru's movie İnce Memed Vuruldu. Until 1998 he appeared in more than 80 movie productions. In 1998, he was cast in Claude Lelouch's movie Hasards ou coïncidences. He subsequently continued his career in television. In 2005, he appeared on stage with Kerem Alışık and İpek Tuzcuoğlu in an adaptation of Selvi Boylum Al Yazmalım at Sadri Alışık Cultural Center. Samancılar ran for Adana's seat in the 1999 Turkish general election, representing the Freedom and Solidarity Party.

Samancılar started writing poems at the age of 15, and has published two poetry books: Sonbaharın Sarısını Vurdular Gece (ISBN 9756530464) in 2003; and Yanmış Orman Kokusu (ISBN 9786059670074) in 2016. He has also expressed his inetersting in screenwriting.

== Filmography ==
- Rüya Gibi (2025-2026)
- Ayrilik da Sevdaya Dahil (2025)
- A Round of Applause (2024)
- Inci Taneleri (2024)
- Ayşe (2024)
- Bambaşka Biri (2023)
- Magarsus (2023)
- Yalı Çapkını (2022–2023)
- Hükümsüz (2021)
- Zümrüdüanka (2020–2021)
- Güvercin (2019–2020)
- Kapı (2019)
- Çukur (2019)
- Çoban Yıldızı (2018)
- Babamın Kanatları (2016)
- Dar Elbise (2016)
- Urfalıyam Ezelden (2014)
- Kayıp (2012)
- Gözetleme Kulesi (2012)
- Hayat Devam Ediyor (2012)
- Bitmeyen Şarkı (2010)
- Asi (2009)
- Sarı Saten (Der gelbe Satin) (2008) - Galip Abi
- Hasret (2006) - Recep Dayı
- Rıza (2006)
- Sıla (2006-2008) - Celil
- Düşler ve Gerçekler (2005) - Sadık
- O Şimdi Mahkum (2005) - Osman
- Kısmet (2004)
- Bütün Çocuklarım (2004) - Ahmet Kıroğlu
- Asmalı Konak - Hayat (2003) - Bekir Kirve
- Sır Çocukları (2002)
- Gönlümdeki Köşk Olmasa (2002) - İmam
- Yıldız Karayel (2002)
- Asmalı Konak (2002) - Bekir Kirve
- Derviş (2001) - Izak
- Vasiyet (2001) - Cambaz
- Sevgi Zamanı (2000)
- Halk Çocuğu (2000)
- Kumru (2000)
- Dilber (1999) - Arif Onbaşı
- Bir Filiz Vardı (1998) - Filiz'in babası
- Hasards ou coïncidences (1998)
- Öldürme Üzerine Küçük Bir Film (1997)
- Ah Nalan Ah (1997)
- İlişkiler (1997)
- Yaban (1996)
- Kış Çiçeği (1996) - Mehmet Umut
- Kurtuluş (1996) - Topal Gazi
- Avrenos'un Müşterileri (1995)
- Mirasyediler (1995) - Tayfur
- Soğuk Geceler (1994) - Mahmut
- Alem Buysa (1994)
- Mavi Sürgün (1993)
- Öldüren Miras (1993)
- Gelincik Tarlası (1993)
- Dönersen Islık Çal (1992)
- Aliye (1992)
- Aysarının Zilleri (1992)
- Zıkkımın Kökü (1992)
- Piano Piano Bacaksız (1992) - Tevfik
- Krallığın Bedeli (1991)
- Siyabend-ü Xece (1991) - Siyabend'in amcası
- Robert'in Filmi (1990)
- Eskici ve Oğulları (1990)
- Karartma Geceleri (1990)
- Kiraz Çiçek Açıyor (1990)
- Darbe (1990)
- Aşkın Zamanı (1990)
- Cahide (1989)
- Gönüller Sultanı Mevlana (1989)
- İçimizden Biri: Yunus Emre (1989) - Derviş Yusuf
- Acı Şarkı (1989)
- Baharın Bittiği Yer (1989)
- Bu Talihimin Canına Okuyacağım (1988)
- Ağlamaya Değer Mi? (1988)
- Ayrı Dünyalar (1988)
- Tanrı Seni Korusun (1988)
- Yedi Uyuyanlar (1988)
- Sis (1988)
- Gramofon Avrat (1987)
- 72. Koğuş (1987)
- Fikrimin İnce Gülü - Sarı Mercedes (1987)
- Biz Doğarken Gülmüşüz (1987)
- Yirmidört Saat (1987)
- Karınca Katar (1987)
- Zamansızlar (1987)
- Can Yoldaşım (1987)
- Bekçi (1986)
- Halkalı Köle (1986)
- Fatmagül'ün Suçu Ne (1986)
- Uzun Bir Gece (1986)
- Güneşe Köprü (1986)
- Gün Akşam Oldu (1986)
- Sevdan Öldürdü Beni (1986)
- Sıcak Tatlı Yaz (1986)
- Parmak Damgası (1985)
- Kaşık Düşmanı (1984)
- Aşk Sürgünü (1984)
- Beş Kafadar (1984)
- Severek Ayrılalım (1984)
- Geçim Otobüsü (1984)
- Bereketli Topraklar Üzerinde (1979)
- Derdim Dünyadan Büyük (1978)
- Kanal (1978)
- Azrailin Beş Atlısı (1978)
- Fırat'ın Cinleri (1977)
- Alçaktan Uçan Güvercin (1977)
- Hıdır (1977)
- Güneşli Bataklık (1977)
- İnce Memed Vuruldu (1975)
- Kara Çarşaflı Gelin (1975)
- Gecelerin Ötesi / İster Darıl İster Sarıl (1974)

== Awards ==
- 1989 Antalya Golden Orange Film Festival, "Best Supporting Actor" (Sis)
- 1993 Adana Golden Boll Film Festival, "Best Actor" (Zıkkımın Kökü)
- 1993 Turkish Film Critics Association Awards, "Best Supporting Actor"
- 1996 Orhon Murat Arıburnu Awards, "Best Actor"
- Contemporary Film Actors Association Awards, "Best Actor"
- 19th Golden Boll Film Festival, "Best Supporting Actor" (Gözetleme Kulesi)
- 23rd Golden Boll Film Festival, "Best Actor" (Babamın Kanatları)
