= Fatih (TV series) =

- Written by: Pınar Uysal; Funda Çetin
- Directed by: Fatih Aksoy
- Starring: Mehmet Akif Alakurt; Gamze Özçelik; Seda Akman; Dağhan Külegeç; Hande Soral; Birkan Sokullu; Salih Bademci; Müjde Uzman; İbrahim Selim; Furkan Şentürk
- Country of origin: Turkey
- Original language: Turkish
- No. of seasons: 1
- No. of episodes: 5

Production
- Running time: 90-150 min.
- Production companies: Med Yapım, FX Epics

Original release
- Network: Kanal D (HD)
- Release: January 5 – June 11, 2013

Fatih is a 2013 Turkish historical television drama series based on the life of Ottoman emperor Mehmed II. The series was broadcast on Kanal D and consisted of only 5 episodes.

== Characters ==
Actor/Actress	Character
Mehmet Akif Alakurt	Mehmed the Conqueror
Gamze Özçelik	Çiçek Hatun
Seda Akman	Gülbahar Hatun
Dağhan Külegeç	Turhan Bey
Hande Soral	Gevherhan Hatun
Birkan Sokullu	Şehzade Mustafa
Salih Bademci	Şehzade Bayezid
Furkan Şentürk	Şehzade Cem
Müjde Uzman	Dilyar
