= Mor Abai Monastery =

Syriac Orthodox monastery in Mardin Province, Turkey

Coordinates: 37.5573°N 40.9584°E

- Mor Abay Manastırı

Religion
- Affiliation: Syriac Orthodox

Location
- Location: Dereiçi, Savur, Mardin, Turkey
- Interactive map of Mor Abai Monastery

Architecture
- Established: 6th century

Mor Abai Monastery is a Syriac Orthodox monastery located in the Savur district of Mardin province, Turkey. Situated in the Syriac-inhabited village of Dereiçi, it was built in the 6th century and dedicated to Mor Abai, who was killed by his father for being a Christian. It was actively used until the 18th century and is now in ruins. In 2021, it was added to the UNESCO World Heritage Tentative List as part of the Late Antique and Medieval Churches and Monasteries of Midyat and Surrounding Area (Tur ʿAbdin).

== Architecture ==
Mor Abai Monastery was built in a north-south direction. Among the inscriptions of the church are those praising the Artuqid rulers and mentioning the relations between Christians and Muslim rulers in the 12th century.
