= Dilberović =

Dilberović is a South Slavic surname. Notable people with the name include:

- Mensud Dilberović, Bosnian footballer who played for Velež, appeared in 1957–58 Yugoslav Cup final
- Sreten Dilberović, Bosnian footballer who played for Sarajevo, winning the 1966–67 Yugoslav First League
- Suada Dilberović, Bosnian war victim
- Stefan Dilberović, Serbian politician from Grocka, 2012 Serbian local elections

== See also ==
- Dilber
