= Çiçek Hatun =

Concubine of Sultan Mehmed II

- Born: c. 1442
- Died: 3 May 1498 (aged 55–56); Cairo, Mamluk Sultanate (present day Egypt)
- Burial: Cairo
- Consort of: Mehmed II
- Issue: Şehzade Cem
- Religion: Sunni Islam (converted)

Çiçek Hatun (Ottoman Turkish: چیچك خاتون; died 3 May 1498) was a concubine of Sultan Mehmed the Conqueror of the Ottoman Empire. She was the mother of Şehzade Cem, a claimant to the Ottoman throne.

== Early years ==
Çiçek Hatun's origins are unknown. However, various sources have attributed Serbian, Greek, Venetian, Turkish, French, or Hungarian origins to her.

According to one account, she was a Serbian noblewoman; according to another, she was a Greek captured during the fall of Constantinople. It has also been claimed that she was the niece of Hunyadi János, or that she was a Turk born in Bursa. According to Münevver Okur Meriç, the vocabulary and expressions used by Çiçek Hatun in her letters suggest that she was of Turkish origin. However, none of these claims have been proven.

The earliest and most reliable account is provided by the historian İbn İyas (d. 1523) in his chronicle Badā’iʿ al-Zuhūr fī Waqā’iʿ al-Duhūr. He describes Çiçek Hatun as "one of the female captives of the Imperial Palace".

According to Uluçay she became Mehmed II's concubine in 1457 or 1458.

She gave birth to her only son, Şehzade Cem, on 22 December 1459. According to Turkish tradition, all princes were expected to work as provincial governors as a part of their training. In 1469, Cem was appointed governor of Kastamonu, and Çiçek Hatun accompanied him. In 1470 or 1471, they went to Istanbul for Cem's circumcision ceremony. After the death of Cem's older brother, Şehzade Mustafa, in 1474, Cem was assigned as governor of Konya, and his mother Çiçek accompanied him once again.

== Exile ==
=== At Egypt ===
After Cem's first defeat in the succession war following his father's death in 1481, the prince, Çiçek Hatun, and the rest of his household took refuge with the Mamluk Sultan in Cairo. Of all the members of Cem's household, Çiçek Hatun was his most devoted ally. Gedik Ahmed Pasha, who had been a tutor to Cem, failed to supply the prince with the support he confidently accepted his challenge to the enthronement of his older brother Bayezid. Although Cem was deserted by his tutor, he was well served by his mother Çiçek Hatun.

=== Cem's imprisonment ===
After a second defeat of Cem by Bayezid in 1482, Cem fled to Rhodes, where he was received by Pierre d'Aubusson, Grand Master of the order of St. John of Jerusalem and a zealous opponent of the Ottoman Empire. Later on, D'Aubusson concluded a peace treaty with Bayezid, and then reached a separate agreement on Cem's captivity. He promised Bayezid to detain Cem in return for an annual payment of 35,000 ducats for his maintenance. Therefore, the Knights took the money and betrayed Cem, who thereafter became a well-treated prisoner at Rhodes.

In Egypt, Çiçek Hatun, was urging the Sultan through his wife to free and bring her son to Egypt. The letters carried by a certain Nicolas de Nicosie revealed that Cem had been communicating with his mother. Çiçek Hatun's efforts to bring her son to Egypt and use her influence in the Mamluk court by urging Qaitbay to help her in this attempt were brought to Bayezid's attention through intelligence reports from Cairo. D'Aubusson used Cem to control Çiçek Hatun and Qaitbay and to wield from them twenty thousand gold pieces by pretending to bring Cem to Egypt.

Çiçek struggled on Cem's behalf for years and served as his principal ally in his efforts to free himself from the European captivity he encountered after his defeat by his brother.

== Death ==
She died on 3 May 1498 of plague and was buried in Cairo. Cem's corpse, however, was returned from Naples, where he died, and was buried in the tomb of his elder brother, Mustafa.

== Issue ==
By Mehmed II, she had a son:

- Şehzade Cem (22 December 1459 - 25 February 1495). He proclaimed himself Sultan and fought for the throne against his half-brother, Bayezid II. Defeated, he fled to Italy, where he died as a hostage in Capua, in the Kingdom of Naples. He had at least three sons and two daughters. His son Murad converted to Christianity and became Prince of Sayd.

== In popular culture ==
- Çiçek Hatun was played by Gamze Özçelik in the 2013 Turkish series Fatih. In the series, she was depicted as Mehmed the Conqueror's favorite concubine.
- In the Turkish historical fiction TV series Mehmed: Fetihler Sultanı, Çiçek Hatun is portrayed by Turkish actress Merve Üçer. In the series, she is depicted as a Bosnian princess, daughter of Thomas of Bosnia.

== Bibliography ==
- Babinger, Franz (1992). Mehmed the Conqueror and His Time. Princeton University Press. ISBN 978-0-691-01078-6.
- Uluçay, M. Çağatay (1985). Padişahların kadınları ve kızları. Türk Tarih Kurumu.
- Peirce, Leslie P. (1993). The Imperial Harem: Women and Sovereignty in the Ottoman Empire. Oxford University Press. ISBN 978-0-195-08677-5.
- Süreyya Bey, Mehmet (1969) [1893/94]. Osmanlı devletinde kim kimdi, Volume 1. Küğ Yayını.
- Yurdusev, A. (January 28, 2016). Ottoman Diplomacy: Conventional or Unconventional?. Springer. ISBN 978-0-230-55443-6.
- Journal of Turkish Studies. Harvard University Printing Office. 1979.
- Cem, Hasan (2004). Osmanlı tarihinde katledilen şehzadeler. Geçit Kitabevi. ISBN 978-9-757-69989-7.
- Yılmaz, Muammer (1996). Cem Sultan. Springer.
- Baysun, Cavid (1946). Cem Sultan: hayati ve ṣiirleri. Ahmet Halit Kitabevi.
- Sakaoğlu, Necdet (2007). Famous Ottoman Women. Avea.
- Har-El, Shai (1995). Struggle for Domination in the Middle East: The Ottoman-Mamluk War, 1485-91. BRILL. ISBN 978-9-004-10180-7.
