= İbn-i Arabi (character) =

Fictional character

- Diriliş: Ertuğrul character
- Ozman Sirgood as Arabi
- First appearance: "Pilot" (2014)
- Last appearance: "Anadolu Planları" (2018); "Diriliş" (2019; voice only)
- Based on: Ibn Arabi
- Adapted by: Mehmet Bozdağ
- Portrayed by: Ozman Sirgood
- Voiced by: Levent Dönmez

In-universe information
- Alias: Arabi
- Occupation: Sheikh; Preacher
- Religion: Islam
- Nationality: Andalusian
- Doctrine: Sufism

İbn-i Arabi, sometimes simply called Arabi, is a character in the Turkish TV series, Diriliş: Ertuğrul where he is portrayed by Ozman Sirgood and voiced by Levent Dönmez. İbn-i Arabi is based on the historical Sufi mystic Ibn Arabi and is considered the most influential character in the series.

== Personality ==
İbn-i Arabi is shown to be a wise old man, who comforts everyone with his soothing words. He is not only wise but is also patient and kind to everyone. The TRT 1 website states about his character; "Andalusian Sufi mystic Ibn Arabi is wise who possesses a spiritual appearance and presence. He is a true friend of God and guides Ertugrul through his religious knowledge."

== Storyline ==
=== Season 1 ===
Arabi is first shown healing a gazelle that was actually injured by Ertuğrul when he was hunting. İbn-i Arabi stays in Aleppo with his dervishes and goes out sometimes too. Meanwhile, Cardinal Thomas, of the Templars, seeks a chest that is kept by the Sufi Sheikh and tasks Claudius to find it. Arabi gives the chest to Ertuğrul and his wife Halime who hide it while Claudius disguises himself as a dervish in order to kill Arabi and seize the chest. Thomas is going against the will of the Üstad-i Azam Petruccio Manzini who does not want Arabi killed yet. Manzini also has his own brother locked up and later killed as he converted to Islam because of Arabi. Claudius nearly kills İbn-i Arabi but he is saved upon the arrival of Ertuğrul and his alps. Claudius escapes but he later actually converts to Islam and becomes one of İbn-i Arabi's dervishes. Later on, Arabi tells Claudius, who is now named Ömer, to work as Ertuğrul's spy in Templar Castle. Ömer becomes influential in Ertuğrul and his father Süleyman Şah's conquest of Templar Castle and killing of Manzini, although Ömer is martyred when his spying is revealed prior to the conquest. After Thomas is sent back to the pope, the castle is razed and Süleyman Şah dies, the Kayı move to Erzurum.

=== Season 2–5 and Kuruluş: Osman ===
Arabi does not make much influence on the second and third season, although he does treat the injured in Geyikli's cave and makes minor appearances from time to time. In season 2, he tells one of his dervishes, Derviş İshaak, to teach the Kayı about Islam and to assist Artuk Bey in his medical responsibilities. He also tells Ertuğrul to open the chest he gave in season 1, the chest revealing a shirt to be worn underneath for Allah's protection. When a portion of the Kayı decide to go to the Western borders, led by Ertuğrul, Arabi sends a group of dervishes to accompany them. In the fourth season, he does not appear for a long time but later comes to save Ertuğrul when Sultan Gıyaseddın was about to behead him for killing his father, the killing actually being done by the devious Sadettin Köpek. Arabi also appears in the dream of Halime Sultan where he reveals to her that she will give birth to a son named Osman, whose descendants will conquer Constantinople (modern Istanbul). He is present in the tribe when Osman is born and recites the Adhan into Osman's ear and names him. After Halime Sultan dies in childbirth, Arabi comforts Ertugrul, encouraging him to follow in the footsteps of the Prophet Muhammad after his wife died. Arabi dies offscreen between Seasons 4 and 5. Following a chase after a chest in season 5, Ertuğrul gives the chest to Sadreddin Konevî, one of İbn-i Arabi's dervishes. His voice can be heard at the end of season 5 and he is mentioned by Ertuğrul in the sequel series Kuruluş: Osman.

== Reception ==
İbn-i Arabi's character has been well received in Pakistan. Ozman Sirgood, who portrays this role offered to work with Pakistani actor, Feroze Khan, who also agreed. They had a conversation after Khan tweeted a quote by Arabi. In 2020, Sirgood, who is an American-Turkish actor, visited young fans in the USA who attended Orange Crescent School, he wrote "Event at Orange Crescent School in California. Lots of love for Dirilis in the USA" on his Instagram account. The actor also praised Pakistani Prime Minister Imran Khan for promoting the series as well as the teaching of Ibn Arabi.

== See also ==
- List of Diriliş: Ertuğrul characters
- List of Kuruluş: Osman characters
