= P-51 Dragon Fighter =

- Film poster
- Directed by: Mark Atkins
- Written by: Mark Atkins
- Produced by: Scott Martin; Michael Slifkin; Henry Mu; Kami Asgar; Tim Tuchrello; Scott Wheeler
- Starring: Scott Martin; Stephanie Beran; Ross Brooks; Thom Rachford; Clint Glenn Hummel; Harwood Gordon; Stephen Suitts; Trey McCurley; Riley Litman; Anthony Dupray; Johnny Kostrey; Paul Whetstone; Michael Hampton; Stephen Blackehart; Pernille Trojgaard
- Cinematography: Mark Atkins
- Edited by: Tim Tuchrello
- Music by: Navid Hejazi
- Production companies: Archstone Pictures; Rogue State
- Distributed by: Archstone Distribution; Edel Media & Entertainment; Interfilm
- Release date: August 19, 2014 (United States)
- Running time: 85 minutes
- Country: United States
- Language: English

P-51 Dragon Fighter is a 2014 science fiction fantasy action film written and directed by Mark Atkins. The film stars Scott Martin, Stephanie Beran, Ross Brooks, Thom Rachford, Clint Glenn Hummel, Harwood Gordon, Stephen Suitts, Trey McCurley, Riley Litman, Anthony Dupray, Johnny Kostrey, Paul Whetstone, Michael Hampton, Stephen Blackehart and Pernille Trojgaard.

== Plot ==
Some time before World War II, a Nazi archaeological expedition had found a dragon's egg and hatched it, setting about to breed more. These dragons are able to reproduce parthenogenically, with one dragon able to reproduce many times, as can each of her "daughters". The dragons themselves are controlled by Vril, Aryan witch women who are psychically connected to the dragons and can command them.

In 1942, Dr. Heinrich Gudrun (Ozman Sirgood), a Nazi cryptozoologist in charge of the dragon breeding program, code named "Skyward", arrives with his brood. The adult dragons and the vrill are intended to regain air superiority in the North African Campaign to support the Afrika Korps, under the command of Field Marshal Erwin Rommel (Robert Pike Daniel).

To combat the dragons, an American general is dispatched with orders to put together a squadron made up of the best Allied fighter pilots that are available, led by Lieutenant John Robbins (Scott Martin), the only survivor of the first fighter squadron to encounter the dragons. General Ward (Thom Rachford) forms the "Ghost Squadron", so named because it does not officially exist. (Note: During World War II, the U.S. Army 23rd Headquarters Special Troops were called the "Ghost Army", set up as a ruse to deceive the Germans about the Normandy landings.)

In their North American P-51 Mustangs, the squadron leads the dragons into a trap made up of numerous flak guns. The guns shoot down two while one of the pilots manages to shoot down a dragon and mark the location before he runs out of fuel and is himself killed by the dragons. Lt. Robbins departs with his friends to go to the shoot-down site to see what they can learn, but are captured by German soldiers, who take them to see Field Marshal Rommel.

Rommel, who has serious doubts about Dr. Gudrun's intentions and the vrill's ability to keep the dragons under control, meets with Robbins. He reveals that, that once in a very long while, the parthenogenic females will lay an egg that hatches out a male dragon, and that the incredibly rare males are so powerful that the legends say they herald the end of the world. Rommel explains this actually means the fall of a civilization, saying that one male dragon had laid waste to the Carthaginian Empire, and another had accelerated the fall of the Roman Empire. He also believes Dr. Gudrun has possession of such an egg in his incubator complex, hidden under a mountain.

Rommel gives Robbins the location of the incubator and explains that he will have an "inside man" open an air vent that lead directly into the incubator. All the Allied pilots have to do is put a bomb down the vent, and the incubator and the eggs will be destroyed. Armed with this information, an air attack with an accompanying British SAS ground mission is planned. General Anderson (Harwood Gordon) obtains a B-17 Flying Fortress bomber from an antisubmarine squadron to handle the problem of a down-the-stack shot.

The Ghost Squadron, escorting the Fortress, keep the Nazi dragons at bay long enough for it to bomb the incubator and destroy the eggs. Rommel's "inside man" — one of the vrill women Dagmar (Pernille Trojgaard), a British agent — opens the facility's air vent for Ghost Squadron. Gundrun releases Asuzaka, a gigantic male dragon, but is incinerated by him. During the aerial battle, only Lt. Marks (Stephen Suitts) is unscathed as each pilot rams a dragon to halt the attacking force of dragons, buying time for the Fortress to reach the mountain and destroy the facility, taking with it Asuzaka and the remaining dragons. When it is thought that Lt. Robbins is also killed, a SAS ground party, however, locates him and bring him back to the headquarters hospital where he reunites with nurse Rachel McKee (Stephanie Beran).

With all the dragon eggs destroyed and the adult dragons killed, the war will proceed with conventional weaponry.

== Cast ==
- Scott Martin as Lieutenant John Robbins
- Stephanie Beran as Rachel McKee
- Ross Brooks as Lieutenant Drake Holdrin
- Thom Rachford as General Ward
- Clint Glenn Hummel as Lieutenant Jake Kranston
- Harwood Gordon as General Anderson
- Stephen Suitts as Lieutenant Arthur Marks
- Trey McCurley as Lieutenant Jeff Campbell
- Riley Litman as 2nd Lieutenant Robert Foy
- Anthony Dupray as Lieutenant Bertrand Galieu
- Johnny Kostrey as Flight Lieutenant Karl Kuttelwascher
- Paul Whetstone as General Dirk Emerick
- Michael Hampton as Pilot Officer Alistair Godfrey
- Stephen Blackehart as Flight Lieutenant Millet
- Pernille Trojgaard as Dagmar (vril)
- Ozman Sirgood as Dr. Heinrich Gudrun
- Robert Pike Daniel as General Erwin Rommel (spelled as "Irwin" Rommel)
- Madison Boyd as Sue Strickland
- Jared Cohn as Lieutenant Gilman

== Production ==
P-51 Dragon Fighter relied heavily on computer-generated imagery to recreate the aerial battles of P-51 Fighter aircraft and dragons. The principal photography in a North Africa landscape was based on location shooting at Blue Cloud Movie Ranch, Santa Clarita, Red Rock Canyon State Park, Cantil, and Trona Pinnacles, Ridgecrest, California.

== Reception ==
In his review of P-51 Dragon Fighter, film critic Martin Hafer notes: "The bottom line is that P-51 is indeed a bad movie—and this should come as no surprise to anyone (except, perhaps, the folks who made the film). It does have some decent production values and might be of interest to the really undemanding and possibly demented film buff. My only worry is that if the film manages to somehow make money that we'll see even weirder mash-ups. What's next—'Cavemen with Nukes', 'Jesus and Gandhi Versus Hitler' or perhaps 'The Obaminator'–where we learn that our president is a robot sent from the future to wipe out mankind?!"
