= Ozman Sirgood =

American actor (born 1957)

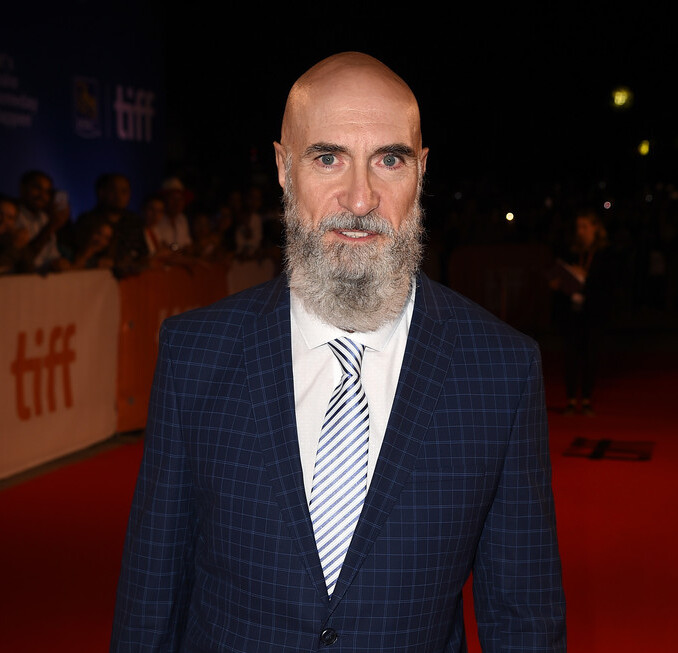
- Born: Osman Soykut; January 1, 1957 (age 69); Ankara, Turkey
- Occupation: Actor
- Years active: 1989–present
- Website: www.sirgood.com

Osman Soykut (born January 1, 1957), better known by his stage name Ozman Sirgood, is an American actor of Turkish and Dagestani heritage.

== Biography ==
Ozman Sirgood is an established actor who works in film and television projects on both sides of the Atlantic. A celebrity in his native Turkey, Ozman makes his home in Los Angeles, California. Ozman's career spans 17 years and three continents.

Ozman was born as Osman Soykut in Ankara, Turkey. His heritage includes Dagestani Avar roots on his mother's side and Crimean Tatar from his father. He attended Frankfurt International School, TED Ankara College Foundation Schools and holds a Bachelor of Architecture degree from the Middle East Technical University.

He moved to California in 1984 and began his acting career in 1989. In 2001, he began receiving training from Milton Katselas at the Beverly Hills Playhouse, continuing until Milton's death in 2008.

Ozman found quick success as an actor in Los Angeles and played in a number of productions including Charmed, Alias, The Bold And The Beautiful, The Hot Chick, Art School Confidential and others.

Discovered for the Turkish market in 2007, Ozman went to Istanbul with a lead role in the TV drama Iki Yabanci. Quickly gaining a reputation as a skilled actor, he continued with bigger roles in Pars Narkoteror and Adanalı.

In 2009, he was cast as the suave and deadly Aron Feller in the long-running TV action drama Kurtlar Vadisi Pusu which he played for three seasons. In 2014, he was selected to play İbn-i Arabi in the historical TV drama Diriliş: Ertuğrul, another very successful role. In 2016, he played opposite Christian Bale as Dep. Gov. Mazhar in the epic drama The Promise directed by Terry George.

== Filmography ==
Year	Title	Role
2021	Eşkıya Dünyaya Hükümdar Olmaz	
2016	The Promise	Deputy Governor Mazhar
2014	Diriliş: Ertuğrul	İbn-i Arabi
2014	P-51 Dragon Fighter	Dr. Heinrich Gudrun
2013	Tatar Ramazan	Kirmastılı Dayı
2012	League of Steam	The Chairman
2012	Merhaba Hayat	Nihat
2011	Wilde Salome	King Herod
2009	Kurtlar Vadisi Pusu	Aron Feller
2009	It's A Mismatch	Mr. Brenner
2008	Adanalı	Zeus
2007	Pars: Narkoterör	Haydar
2007	Dağlar Delisi	Carl
2007	İki Yabancı	Mustafa Hasırcı
2007	Game of Life	Mr. Rafiki
2007	Art School Confidential	Dad Platz
2006	Petrified	Dr. Horatio Van Gelder
2005	Shopgirl	Ballroom Guest
2005	The Net 2.0	Oscar
2005	Alias	Alliance Member
2003	The Bold and the Beautiful	Vijay
2003	One of Them	Santiago
2002	Charmed	Dark Priest
2002	The Hot Chick	The King
2023	Al Sancak	Mithat
2024	Mehmed: Fetihler Sultani	Loukas Notaras
