= Timur Acar =

Turkish actor (born 1979)

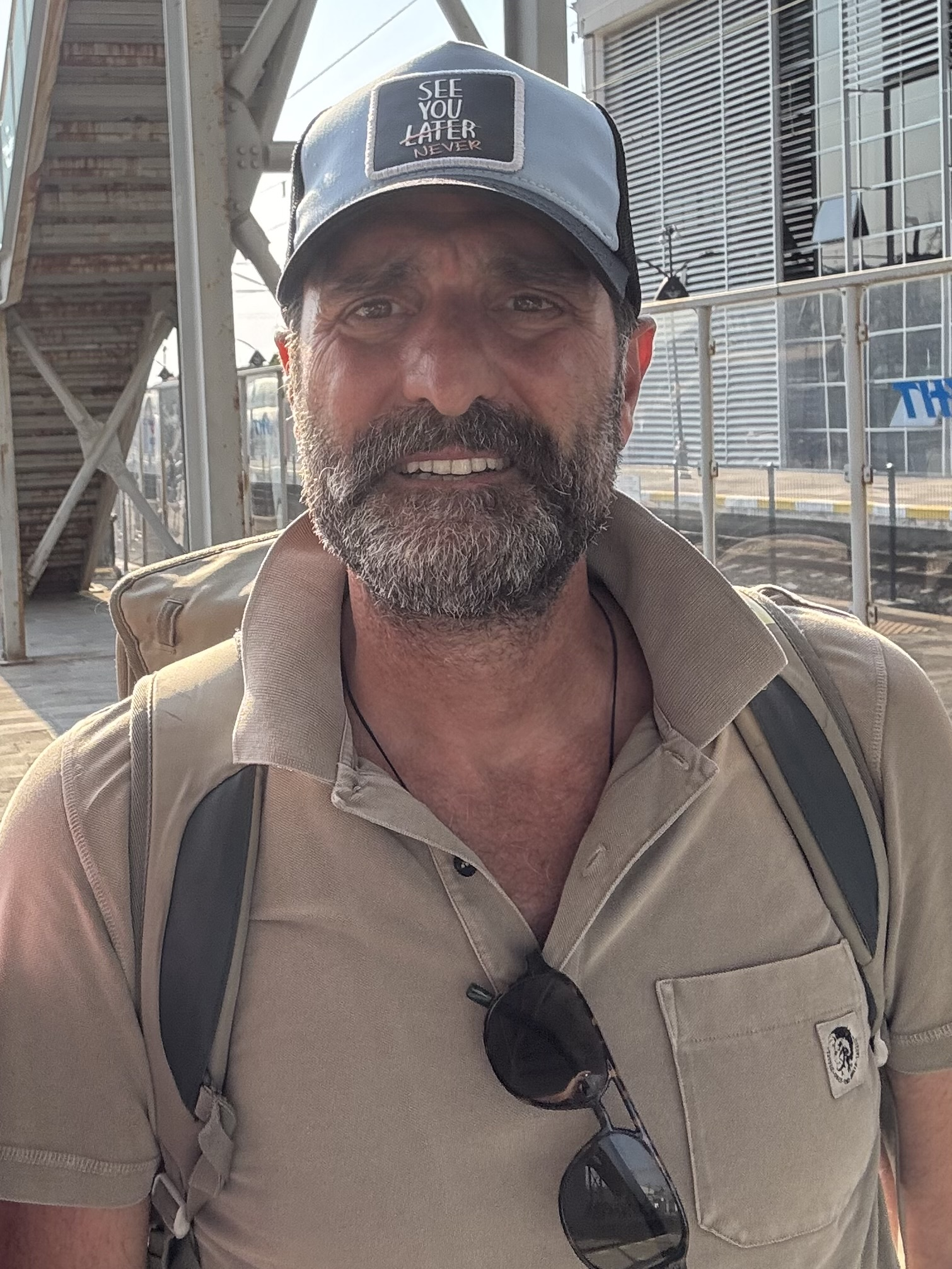
- Born: 22 December 1979 (age 46); Munich, Germany
- Occupation: Actor
- Years active: 2007–present
- Height: 1.83 m (6 ft 0 in)
- Spouses: Özlem Karabay (m. 2007; div. 2009) Eda Özerkan (m. 2016)
- Children: 1

Timur Acar (born 22 December 1979) is a Turkish actor.

== Life and career ==
Acar was born and raised in Germany and later moved to Turkey with his family. Following the 1999 İzmit earthquake, the family moved to Karasu. His family are of Georgian descent and originally lived in Batumi. Acar is one of the founders of Moda Sahnesi, a cultural center in Istanbul. He started his career in 1999 by appearing in theatre plays and received his education at Dokuz Eylül University.

He rose to prominence through his roles in the period series Kurşun Yarası, hit sitcom Avrupa Yakası and Akasya Durağı. He played in franchise comedy film series "Çakallarla Dans". In 2013, he starred in the TV series Bebek İşi as Murat. In Kertenkele, he portrayed three different characters simultaneously. He was first married in 2007 but the marriage dissolved in 2009. In July 2016, he married actress Eda Özerkan with whom he has a daughter.

== Filmography ==
Film
Year	Title	Role	Notes
2005	Organize İşler		
2008	Ulak	2nd apostle	
2009	Çıngıraklı Top	Nuri	
2009	Türkler Çıldırmış Olmalı	Recep	
2009	Başka Dilde Aşk	Policeman	
2009	Ah Kalbim		
2009	Gomeda	Truck driver	
2010	Çakallarla Dans	Necmi	
2011	Devrimden Sonra	Policeman	
2012	Çakallarla Dans 2: Hastasıyız Dede	Necmi	
2014	Hayat Sana Güzel	Taner	
2014	Çakallarla Dans 3: Sıfır Sıkıntı	Necmi	
2016	Çakallarla Dans 4	Necmi	
2018	Çakallarla Dans 5	Necmi	
2019	Kapı	Remzi	
2019	Akıllara Seza	Galip	
2019	Kırk Yalan	Kamil	
2021	Karanlık Şehir Hikayeleri: Kilit	Mesut	
2022	Çakallarla Dans 6	Necmi	
2023	Cenazemize Hoş Geldiniz		

Television
Year	Title	Role	Notes
2007	Kurşun Yarası		
2008	Kaybedenler		
2009	Avrupa Yakası	İzzet	
2010–2012	Akasya Durağı	Arif Keser	111 episodes (63–174)
2011	Disko Kralı	Himself	Guest appearance
2012	Leyla ile Mecnun	Namık	1 episode (85)
2013	Yalan Dünya	Zorbey	
2013	Bebek İşi	Murat	34 episodes (1–34)
2013	Erkek Tarafı		
2014–2016	Kertenkele	Ziya Bilgin, Kertenkele, Kara Faruk	71 episodes (1–71)
2017–2018	Ekip 2	Alparslan Zengin	
2017	Nerdesin Birader	Yiğit, Yunus	4 episodes (1–4)
2018	Söz	Derman	14 episodes (36–50)
2019	Eser Yenenler Show	Himself	Guest appearance
2020–2021	İyi Aile Babası/Babam Çok Değişti	Rıfkı Pamuk	8 episodes (1–8)
2021	Uzak Şehrin Masalı	Affan	5 episodes (1–5)
2022	Oğlum	İlyas Özyürek	
2022–2023	Barbaros Hayreddin: Sultanın Fermanı	Andrea Doria	
2023	Şahane Hayatım	Selo / Selahattin	

Theatre
Year	Title	Role	Notes
	En Kısa Gecenin Rüyası		
	6 Oyuncu Yönetmenini Arıyor		
	Hamlet		
	Hırçın Kız		
	Testosteron		

Music videos
Year	Title	Role	Notes
2011	"Uzun İnce Bir Yoldayım"		
2019	"Bir Ay Doğar"		
