= Bir Küçük Gün Işığı =

Turkish television series

- Genre: Drama
- Created by: Emre Kabakuşak
- Written by: Özgür Evren Heptürk; Elif Başaran; Kerem Bozok; Pervin Bozan; Nuriye Bilici; Mustafa Mutlu; Birol Elginöz
- Directed by: Emre Kabakuşak
- Starring: Seray Kaya; Berk Oktay; Esra Dermancıoğlu
- Composer: Alp Yenier
- Country of origin: Turkey
- Original language: Turkish
- No. of seasons: 1
- No. of episodes: 36

Production
- Executive producer: Nazlı Heptürk
- Production company: NGM Medya

Original release
- Network: ATV
- Release: 5 September 2022 – 5 June 2023

Bir Küçük Gün Işığı (English title: A Little Sunshine) is a Turkish drama television series created by Emre Kabakuşak and produced by NGM Medya. It aired on ATV from 5 September 2022 to 5 June 2024. The series stars Seray Kaya and Berk Oktay.

== Cast ==
- Seray Kaya as Elif Kara
- Berk Oktay as Fırat Ayaz
- Esra Dermancıoğlu as Ümran Ayaz
- Tuğçe Açıkgöz as Dila Ayaz
- Şeyma Korkmaz as Sude
- Azra Aksu as Güneş Kara
- Yılmaz Bayraktar as Yılmaz
- Güneş Hayat as Mehveş
- Eda Özerkan as Feraye
- Beran Kotan as Alper
- Gizem Ünsal as Fulya Bilgin
- Yiğit Yapıcı as Hakan Kara
- Cansu Senem as Zerrin Yalman
- Nail Kırmızıgül as Cemil Ayaz
- Süreyya Kilimci as Gülümser
- Melis Gürhan as Yasemin
- Tuna Arman as Lamia
- Altan Erkekli as Eşref
- Armağan Oğuz as Sinan
- Yıldız Kültür as Ayten
