= Seray Kaya =

Turkish actress (born 1991)

- Born: 4 February 1991 (age 35); Istanbul, Turkey
- Occupation: Actress
- Years active: 2012–present
- Website: Official website

Seray Kaya (born 4 February 1991) is a Turkish actress known for playing Lena Hatun in historical series Kuruluş: Osman.

== Early life ==
Seray Kaya was born on 4 February 1991 in Istanbul, Turkey. Her maternal family is of Circassian descent. During her high school years she pursued her education as a make-up artist, after her high school education, she was enrolled in Sadri Alışık Culture Centre where she received adequate training for acting.

== Career ==
Kaya began her acting career in 2012, she appeared in the series Huzur Sokağı and portrayed the character of Rezzan. In 2014, she appeared in the series Kocamın Ailesi and portrayed the character of Miray. In 2016, she had a leading role in the series Gülümse Yeter and depicted the character of Gül, it starred Erdal Özyağcılar, Aslı Bekiroğlu, Evrim Doğan and others. In 2017, she had a leading role in the series Kadın and depicted the character of Şirin Sarıkadı. Kaya has stated she received a lot of criticism and hatred on social media, due to portraying a negative character in the series. In 2019, she made her cinematic debut in the movie Türkler Geliyor: Adaletin Kılıcı and depicted the character of Maria. In 2020, she appeared in the historical fiction series Kuruluş: Osman and portrayed the character of Lena Hatun. In 2021, Kaya starred in the series Mahkum, the show was adaptation of South Korean show Innocent Defendant. She portrayed the character of Cemre, it starred Onur Tuna and İsmail Hacıoğlu as main characters. In 2022, with the series still being on-air, Kaya left the series.

== Personal life ==
Seray Kaya's father Hasan Kaya died on 3 February 2019 due to heart attack, a day before her 28th birthday. She announced the death of her father through Instagram. On 4 February 2020, in addition to celebrating her 29th birthday, she released a song called Baba, in tribute to his death.

== Filmography ==
Film
Year	Title	Role	Notes
2019	Türkler Geliyor: Adaletin Kılıcı	Maria	Leading role
Television
2012	Huzur Sokağı	Rezzan	Supporting role
2014	Kocamın Ailesi	Miray Ar	Supporting role
2016	Gülüsme Yeter	Gül Özdemir	Leading role
2017–2020	Kadın	Şirin Sarıkadı	Leading role
2020–2021	Kuruluş: Osman	Lena Hatun	Supporting role
2021–2022	Mahkum	Cemre Uysal	Leading role
2022–2023	Bir Küçük Gün Işığı	Elif Kara	Leading role
2024	Kopuk	Müjde	Leading role
2025–	Kızılcık Şerbeti	Başak	Leading role
