= Esra Dermancıoğlu =

Turkish actress (born 1968)

- Born: Esra Altınay; 7 December 1968 (age 57)
- Occupation: Actress
- Years active: 2008–present
- Spouse: Mehmet Dermancıoğlu (div. 2010)
- Children: 1

Esra Dermancıoğlu (née Altınay; born 7 December 1968) is a Turkish actress and comedian, known for her role as Mukaddes Ketenci in the drama series Fatmagül'ün Suçu Ne?. She also appears in Kırgın Çiçekler as Zehra.

== Life and career ==
Dermancıoğlu studied at Pierre Loti High School and continued her education at Franklin College Switzerland. She received acting lessons from Şahika Tekand at Stüdyo Oyuncuları and singing lessons from Derya Alabora. She made her acting debut with the help of Gülse Birsel by appearing in an episode of Avrupa Yakası. In 2010, she had a role in the short movie Moral Bozukluğu ve 31. Dermancıoğlu then continued her career on television. Her breakthrough came with her role in the Fatmagül'ün Suçu Ne? TV series, in which she played the role of Mukaddes. She further came to the spotlight by appearing in a leading role in the comedy movie Kadın İşi: Banka Soygunu.

Dermancıoğlu has been married three times. She divorced her third husband, Mehmet Dermancıoğlu, as he was opposed to her decision to pursue a career in acting. The couple had a daughter, born in 2003.

== Filmography ==
Television
Year	Title	Role	Notes	Network
2008	Sen Harikasın		Guest appearance	atv
2008	Avrupa Yakası		Guest appearance	atv
2010–2012	Fatmagül'ün Suçu ne?	Mukaddes Ketenci	Supporting role	Kanal D
2012	Küçük Hesaplar		Guest appearance	Star TV
2013	Galip Derviş	Seer Şükriye	Guest appearance	Kanal D
2013–2014	Doksanlar	Şükran Tuncay	Leading role	atv
2014	Ulan İstanbul	Aytop	Guest appearance	Kanal D
2014	Sil Baştan	Yelda Yeşilyurt	Leading role	Star TV
2015	Serçe Sarayı	Süla	Leading role	Star TV
2015–2016	Muhteşem Yüzyıl: Kösem	Cennet Hatun	Supporting role	Star TV
2016–2018	Kırgın Çiçekler	Zehra Celen	Supporting role	atv
2018	Şahin Tepesi	Ceylan	Leading role	atv
2019–2021	Bir Zamanlar Çukurova	Behice Hekimoğlu	Leading role	atv
2021–2022	Kaderimin Oyunu	Zahide Demirhan	Leading role	Star TV
2022–2023	Bir Küçük Gün Işığı	Ümran Ayaz	Leading role	atv
2023–2024	Hudutsuz Sevda	Asiye Leto / Kayatan	Leading role	FOX/NOW
2024–2025	Siyah Kalp	Hikmet Şansalan	Leading role	Show TV
2026	Anne Yarısı	Meryem Altay	Leading role	NOW
Streaming series
Year	Title	Role	Notes	Platform
2024	Dilemma		Leading role	Amazon Prime
Film
Year	Title	Role	Notes	
2010	Moral Bozukluğu ve 31	Sexy neighbor	Leading role	
2014	Kadın İşi: Banka Soygunu	Dürdane	Leading role	
2015	Hayalet Dayı	Samet	Leading role	
2015	Merdiven Baba	Süheyla	Leading role	
2017	Ayla	Sebahat Dilbirliği	Supporting role	
2025	En Güzel Cenaze Şarkıları	Saadet	Leading role	

== Theatre ==
Theatre
Year	Title	Role	Venue	Position
2013	Şapkalı O***** Çocuğu	Victoria	İkincikat	Actress
2014	Poz	Azra	İkincikat	Actress
2016	Kozalar		Tiyatro Pangar	Actress
2019	Klan	Kadın	Tebdil-i Mekan Prodüksiyon Tiyatrosu	Actress and project designer
2020	Varlık		Podcato	Actress
2021	Başka Bir Dünyada Görüşürüz		Podcato	Actress
2023	b/ağ		DasDas	Project designer
2024	Muskat		Mall of İstanbul MOİ Sahne	Actress

== Awards and nomination ==
Awards
Year	Award	Category	Work	Result	Reference
2014	19th Sadri Alışık Theatre and Cinema Acting Awards	Best Supporting Actress in a Comedy Role	Kadın İşi: Banka Soygunu	Nominated	
2015	3rd Ekin Yazın Friends Theatre Awards	Best Supporting Actress	Poz	Won	
2016	21st Sadri Alışık Theatre and Cinema Acting Awards	Best Supporting Actress in a Comedy Role	Hayalet Dayı	Won	
2025	45th Istanbul Film Festival	Best Actress	En Güzel Cenaze Şarkıları	Won	
