= Adanalı =

Turkish police comedy TV series

- Genre: Action, Crime, Comedy
- Written by: Tayfun Güneyer
- Directed by: Adnan Güler
- Starring: Oktay Kaynarca; Mehmet Akif Alakurt; Ekin Türkmen; Çağkan Çulha; Cemal Hünal; Zeynep Özder; Umut Oğuz; Tuğçe Özbudak; Selim Erdoğan; Eda Özerkan; Serenay Sarıkaya
- Narrated by: Tayfun Güneyer
- Theme music composer: Ceza; Yalın; İzel
- Country of origin: Turkey
- Original language: Turkish
- No. of seasons: 3
- No. of episodes: 79

Production
- Running time: 90 minutes (up to 120 minutes with commercials)
- Production company: Kuzey Production

Original release
- Network: ATV November 7, 2008 – November 7, 2010
- Release: 7 November 2008 – 7 November 2010

Adanalı is a Turkish crime comedy drama TV series that was broadcast by ATV in 2008.

== Cast ==
| Cast | Role | Appearances by episode | Reason for Leaving |
|---|---|---|---|
| Oktay Kaynarca | Adanalı (Yavuz Dikkaya) | 1-79 | lasted till last episode |
| Mehmet Akif Alakurt | Maraz Ali (Ali Gökdeniz) | 1-79 | Cengiz Komiser killed. |
| Selin Demiratar | İdil Ertürk | 1-47 | Atilla Komutan killed. |
| Zeynep Koltuk | Maria | 1-60 | Was killed by an exploded car. |
| Eda Özerkan | Nazlı Karabağ | 49-70 | Was killed with a long-barreled gun. |
| Serenay Sarıkaya | Sofia | 1-70 | She went abroad. |
| Çağkan Çulha | Engin | 1-79 | lasted till last episode. |
| Cemal Hünal | Alex Mertcan | 71-79 | lasted till last episode. |
| Tuğçe Özbudak | Pınar | 15-79 | lasted till last episode. |
| Selim Erdoğan | Neco | 71-79 | lasted till last episode. |
| Umut Oğuz | Fiko / Lezize Nine | 3-79 | lasted till last episode. |
| Ayhan Eroğlu | Matador İsmail | 2-57 | Maraz Ali killed. |
| Ozman Sirgood | Zeus (as Osman Soykut) | 13-17 | Maraz Ali killed. |
| Alican Yücesoy | Tilki Timur | 1-54 | Flees abroad with other gang members. |
| Fırat Albayram | Boncuk | 1-54 | Flees abroad with other gang members. |
| Rüzgar Aksoy | Ferruh | 1-54 | Flees abroad with other gang members. |
| Gökhan Kıraç | Mülayim | 1-30 | He went to the army. |
| Ebru Şam | Esra Komiser | 47-70 | left |
| Orhan Aydın | Nevzat Müdür | 1-69 | Maraz Ali killed. |
| Pınar Dikici | Ayşegül Gökdeniz | 1-30 | She went to university. |
| Seda Bakan | Başak | 24-30 | left |
| Ergun Taş | Öküz Ömer | 13-58 | left |
| Serdar Yeğin | Tarık | 19-30 | He was sent to prison. |
| Nilüfer Silsüpür | Derya | 1-30 | left |
| Mehmet Çepiç | Samet Komiser | 1-34 | left |
| Volkan Ünal | Ertan Başkomiser | 32-70 | left |
| Dolunay Soysert | Elif Müdür | 66-70 | left |
| Demir Karahan | Atilla Komutan | ? | |
