= Mehmet Akif Alakurt =

Turkish actor and model

- Born: July 23, 1979 (age 47); Ordu, Turkey
- Occupations: Actor, model
- Years active: 2001–2016
- Notable work: Sıla as “Boran Ağa Adanalı as Maraz Ali
- Height: 1.89 m (6 ft 2 in)
- Awards: Best Model of Turkey (2001)

Mehmet Akif Alakurt (born July 23, 1979) is a Turkish-born Georgian actor and former model. He is best known for his role as Maraz Ali in the Tv series Adanalı (2008-2010). His role as Boran Ağa in the television drama Sıla (2006–2008) brought him national and international recognition.

== Career ==
Mehmet Akif Alakurt began his career in the fashion industry as a model under the Neşe Erberk agency. In 1998, he was awarded the titles of Most Promising Model and Turkey Prince. His modeling career quickly gained momentum, and in 2001, he won both the Best Model of Turkey and Best Model of the World titles. He went on to win the Best Model of the World award again in 2002.

Following his success in modeling, Alakurt transitioned into acting. He made his television debut in 2002 in the series Kırık Ayna, portraying the character Ali Kirman alongside Kadir İnanır, Burak Hakkı, and Yeşim Büber. In 2005, he played the role of Kenan in Zeytin Dalı, acting opposite Bergüzar Korel. The following year, he appeared in the drama Hacı as Ahmet Gesili, starring with veteran actor Tuncel Kurtiz.

Alakurt's breakthrough came in 2006 when he was cast as Boran Ağa, the male lead in the television series Sıla. His performance as the authoritative but devoted husband of Cansu Dere's character gained widespread acclaim and made him a household name across Turkey and internationally.

In 2008, he took on the role of Maraz Ali in the crime drama Adanalı. His character was portrayed as a clever and principled thief, and the show enjoyed a successful multi-season run. In 2011, he starred in Reis as Murat, a man who returns to Turkey from the United States to find his family facing serious financial troubles. The character takes up work as a fisherman to support his loved ones and repay their debts.

After 2014, Alakurt gradually stepped away from acting and has since remained largely out of the public eye.

In 2022, via an Instagram story, Alakurt stated that he is of Georgian descent..

=== Television ===
| Year | Title | Role | Notes |
|---|---|---|---|
| 2003 | Kirik Ayna | Ali Kirman | TV series |
| 2004 | Metro Palas | Ural | TV series |
| 2005 | Zeytin Dali | Kenan | TV series |
| 2006 | Haci | Ahmet Gesili | TV series |
| 2006–2008 | Sıla | Boran Genco | TV series |
| 2008–2010 | Adanalı | Maraz Ali | TV series |
| 2011 | Reis | Murat Reis | TV series |
| 2013 | Fatih | Fatih Sultan Mehmet | TV series |
| 2014 | Emanet | Firat | TV series |
