= Eda Özerkan =

Turkish actress

- Born: March 11, 1984 (age 41); Adana, Turkey
- Occupation(s): Actress, model and presenter
- Years active: 2004–present
- Spouse: Timur Acar (m. 2016)
- Children: 1

Eda Özerkan (born March 11, 1984) is a Turkish actress. She is best known for her roles in Pars: Operation Cherry (2007) and Girdap (2008), as well as the TV series Aşk-ı Memnu.

== Filmography ==
Film
Year	Title	Role	Notes
2007	Pars: Kiraz Operasyonu	Füsun	
2008	Girdap	Zeynep	

Television
Year	Title	Role	Notes
2005	Cennet Mahallesi	Cansel	1 episodes (58)
2008–2009	Aşk-ı Memnu	Elif	50 episodes (1–50)
2008	Mordkommission Istanbul	Nur	
2009	Disko Kralı	Herself	Guest appearance
2009–2010	Adanalı	Nazlı	21 episodes (49–70)
2012	Firar	Elif	18 episodes (17–35)
2014	Survivor Ünlüler - Gönüllüler	Herself	Contestant
2014–2016	Kertenkele	Selin	49 episodes (1–49)
2022-2023	Bir Küçük Gün Işığı	Feraye	
