= Tuğçe Özbudak =

Turkish actress (born 1982)

- Born: 10 June 1982 (age 43); Ankara, Turkey
- Education: Bilkent University
- Occupations: Actress and presenter
- Years active: 2006–present
- Spouse: Melikhan Kılıçarslan (m. 2020)

Tuğçe Özbudak (born 10 July 1982) Turkish actress.

== Filmography ==
Title	Role	Year	Type
Aloya	Zeynep	2006	TV series
Kod Adı	Başak Yörükoğlu	2006	TV series
El Gibi	Elif	2006	TV series
Kod Adı: Kaos	Başak Yörükoğlu	2006	TV series
Kuzey Rüzgarı	Canan	2007–2008	TV series
Son Ders: Aşk ve Üniversite	Kübra	2007	Film
Yalan Dünya	İpek	2006	TV series
Adanalı	Pınar	2008–2010	TV series
Gece Gündüz	Aynur	2009	TV series
Memur Muzaffer	Gizem	2007	TV series
Yusuf Yusuf	Zeynep	2015	Film
