= Sıla (TV series) =

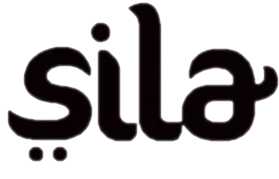
- Sila Logo
- Genre: Romantic drama
- Created by: Gül Oğuz
- Written by: Sema Ergenekon; Eylem Canpolat; Muharrem Buhara; Bektaş Topaloğlu
- Directed by: Gül Oğuz; Yasin Uslu
- Starring: Cansu Dere; Mehmet Akif Alakurt; Zeynep Eronat; Menderes Samancılar; Fatoş Tez
- Theme music composer: Murat Tunali; Can Hatipoğlu
- Opening theme: Tōre
- Country of origin: Turkey
- Original language: Turkish
- No. of seasons: 3
- No. of episodes: 79

Production
- Producer: Nezihe Dikilitaş
- Production locations: Istanbul, Turkey; Mardin, Turkey
- Camera setup: Multi-camera
- Running time: 90 minutes (with commercials)
- Production companies: Fm Yapım; Most Production

Original release
- Network: ATV
- Release: September 15, 2006 – September 20, 2008

Related
- Tere Bin (2022 TV series)

Sıla is a Turkish television series directed by Gül Oğuz for ATV and ATV Avrupa (Europe) in 2006. On September 15, 2006, ATV started broadcasting Sila. The last episode was broadcast on September 20, 2008.

Sila began airing in the Arab World in 2010 and gained great popularity and success throughout its run. In Greece, Sıla began airing on Mega Channel on June 10, 2012. In Croatia, this series was aired from December 2012 to May 2013 on Nova TV. In Serbia, Montenegro and Bosnia and Herzegovina this series started on December 15, 2013 at 20:00 on RTV Pink, Pink M and Pink BH, and it became one of the highest watched Turkish TV series breaking all records.

In Slovakia started on August 5, 2013 on channel TV Doma and was breaking channel records. In Slovenia started on May 15, 2014 on channel POP TV, and in North Macedonia on October 1, 2014 on Sitel TV. In Romania started on January 5, 2015 on the channels PRO TV (the first 4 episodes) and Acasă (all of episodes). In Bulgaria started on February 9, 2015 on channel bTV. In Chile started on March 8, 2015 on channel Mega, in Colombia in 2016 it will be released soon by RCN Television. In Brazil started on 2016, as part of TV Bandeirantes programming.

== Episodes ==
Season	Episodes	Episodes range	Originally aired		Season's years
Season	Episodes	Episodes range	First aired	Last aired	Season's years
1	38	1 - 38	September 15, 2006	June 15, 2007	2006 - 2007
2	37	39 - 75	September 14, 2007	June 6, 2008	2007 - 2008
3	4	76 - 79	August 29, 2008	September 20, 2008	2008

== Plot ==
Sila was born in Midyat, Mardin to Celil and Beder. She is later given to a wealthy family in Istanbul by Celil in exchange for money. Celil convinced Beder that Sila had a terminal illness and hence had to be given away.

After many years, Sila, now a 17 year old, lives in Istanbul with her adoptive parents. She is pampered by her parents and has a boyfriend named Emre. In Mardin, Sila's biological brother, Azad, has run away with Narin, the sister of the Genco tribe's leader Boran Agha. When they are caught by Boran, the tribe orders a death sentence on them as per the 'honour code'. However, this is later forgiven as Boran agrees to the Bride exchange ritual, which requires Azad's sister, Sila, to be married to Boran.

Celil and Azad come to Istanbul on the night of Sila's graduation to take her away to Mardin, claiming that her biological mother is very sick and needed to see her before she died. However, in reality she is being deceived to marry Boran. Sila and her adoptive father go to Mardin in order to meet Sila's biological family but later her father has to return for urgent work. Nevertheless, Sila decides to stay a little bit longer as she is thinking that they are celebrating her brother Azad's wedding and her return together. However, on the day of their wedding Azad holds Sila at gunpoint and threatens to shoot her if she does not agree to marry Boran. Fearing for her life, Sila signs the marriage papers. On their wedding night, Sila tells everything to Boran and asks for a divorce. However Boran, knowing the tribe's rules, refuses to annul the marriage. A few days later, Sila's adoptive parents come to Mardin after failing to communicate with her. When they insist Sila to return to Istanbul, she refuses as this could threaten Azad and Narin's lives. Sila and her parents decide to make an escape plan for Sila. However, on returning to Istanbul, her parents die in an accident and Sila has to now remain the wife of Boran.

== Cast ==
- Cansu Dere as Sila Sönmez/Özdemir/Genco - Wife of Boran, mother of Bedirhan, Sude, and Bade, daughter of Bedar & Celil, sister of Azad, Dilan & Emir
- Mehmet Akif Alakurt as Boran Ağa/Boran Genco - Leader of Mardin tribe, husband of Sila, father of Bedirhan, Sude, and Bade, son of Kevser & Firuz Ağa, brother of Narin
- Zeynep Eronat as Bedar Sönmez - Wife of Celil, mother of Sila, Azad, Dilan & Emir
- Menderes Samancılar as Celil Sönmez - Husband of Bedar, father of Sila, Azad, Dilan & Emir
- Fatoş Tez as Kevser Genco/Kevser Hanım/Hanım Ağa - Wife of Firuz Ağa, mother of Boran & Narin
- Fatoş Sezer as Mehveş - Sister of Bedar, aunt of Sila, Azad, Dilan & Emir
- Muhammed Cangören as Zinar Genco - Brother of Firuz Ağa, father of Cihan & Dilaver, uncle of Boran & Narin
- Kartal Balaban as Emre Türkoğlu - Friend & in love with Sila, son of Kenan
- Devrim Saltoğlu as Cihan Genco - Son of Zinar, brother of Dilaver, husband of Ümmü, kills to Azad, killed shot by Burhan
- Cemal Toktaş as Azad Sönmez - Son of Bedar & Celil, husband of Narin, brother of Sila, Dilan & Emir, killed by Cihan
- Boncuk Yılmaz as Narin Genco/Narin Sönmez - Wife of Azad, daughter of Kevser & Firuz Ağa, sister of Boran
- Tayanç Ayaydın as Abay - Best friend and "brother" of Boran
- İsmet Hürmüzlü as Firuz Ağa/Firuz Genco #1 - Former leader of Mardin tribe, husband of Kevser, father of Boran & Narin, brother of Zinar
- Namık Kemal Yiğittürk as Firuz Ağa/Firuz Genco #2 - Former leader of Mardin tribe, husband of Kevser, father of Boran & Narin, brother of Zinar
- Vural Tantekin as Şivan - Brother of Ayşe, employee of Boran
- Celil Nalçakan as Dilaver Genco - Son of Zinar, brother of Cihan
- Sermiyan Midyat as Berzan - commits suicide
- Tarık Şerbetçioğlu as Burhan Özdemir - Nephew of Erkan & Nese, husband of Esma, kill shot to Cihan, killed by prisoner in jail
- Gökçe Yanardağ as Esma Özdemir - Wife of Burhan, mistress of Cihan, try to kills shot to Sila
- İpek Tanrıyar as Doktor Zeynep
- Esra Akhisarlı as Zeliha
- Duygu Eriçok as Dr. Ceren
- Serap Doğan as Ümmü - Wife of Cihan
- Sinem Yaruk as Ayşe - Sister of Şivan, servant of Boran
- Mehmet Dağ as Emir Sönmez - Son of Bedar & Celil, brother of Sila, Azad & Dilan
- Nisan Turgul as Lusin - Sister of Abay
- Hümeyra Akbay as Nese Özdemir - Wife of Erkan, adoptive mother of Sila, killed in car accident
- Cüneyt Turel as Erkan Özdemir - Husband of Nese, adoptive father of Sila, killed in car accident
- Zeynep Anıl Tatdıran as Dilan Sönmez - Daughter of Bedar & Celil, sister of Sila, Azad & Emir
- Burçin Oraloğlu as Kenan Türkoğlu - Father of Emre
- Sema Mumcu as Gizem
- Muzaffer Demirel as Edip
- Yüksel Arıcı as Ahmet Ağa - try to kills to Boran, ends up goes to jail
- Boğaçhan Yağ as Ömer
- Emin Yaşar as Osman
- Gürol Güngör as Samim
- Nalan Gücüpek as Dr. Duygu Kaya
