= Dereiçi, Savur =

Village in Savur, Turkey

Dereiçi
- Neighbourhood
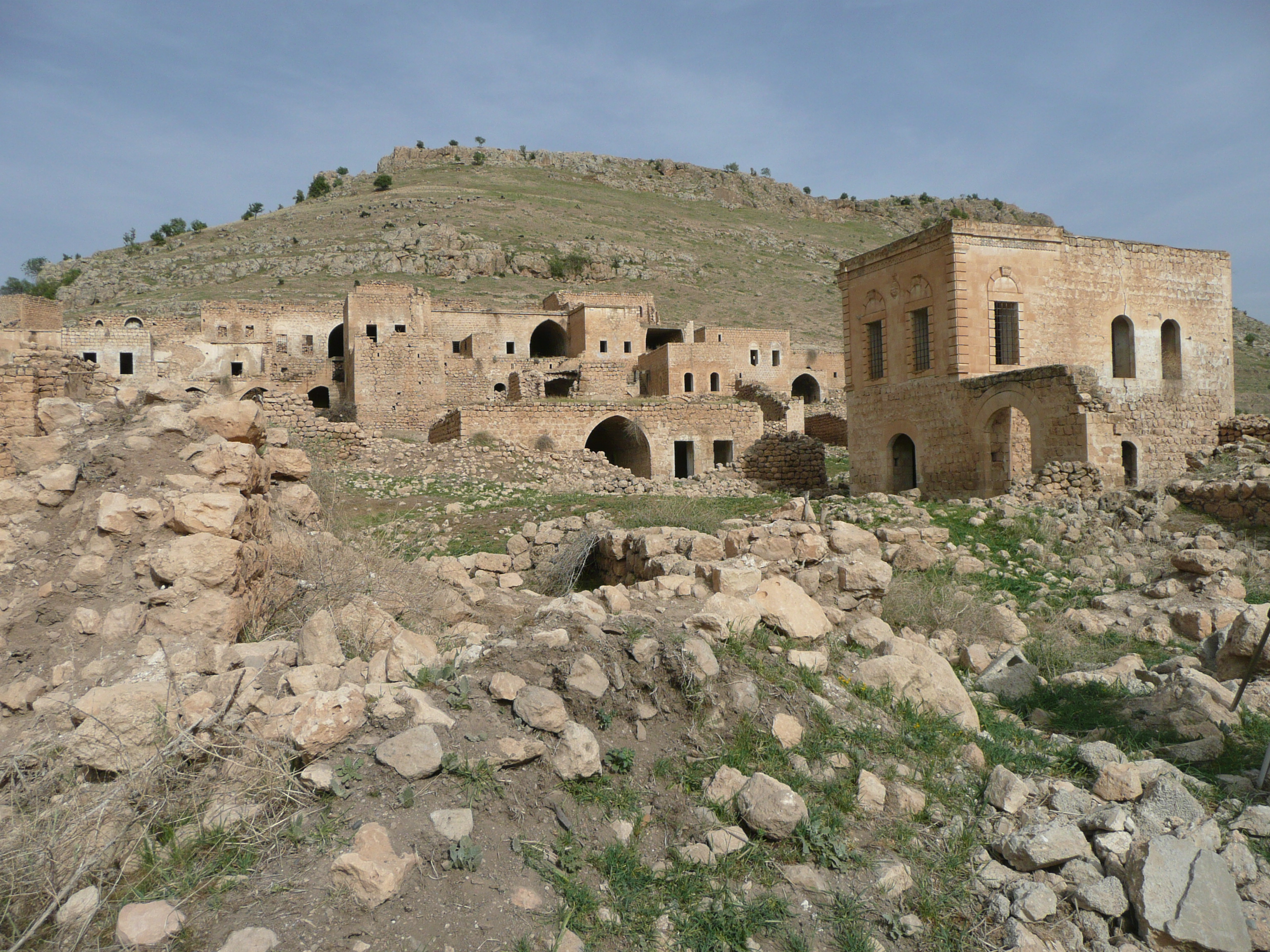

- Location within Turkey
- Coordinates: 37°32′54″N 40°57′38″E
- Country: Turkey
- Province: Mardin
- District: Savur
- Population (2023): 187
- Time zone: UTC+3 (TRT)

Dereiçi (Note: "the inner part of the valley" in Turkish. Also spelt as Dere İçi.) (Arabic: قلث; Syriac: ܩܠܬ, romanized: Qeleth) (Note: Alternatively transliterated as Keleth, Kellef, Kellêt, Kellith, Killit, Killith, Kullith, Qēliḏ, Qelith, Qelıth, Qelleth, Qellith, Qilleţ, Qilleth, Qıllıt, and Qillith. Nisba: Qıltōyo.) is a neighbourhood of the municipality and district of Savur, Mardin Province in Turkey. In 2023, the population was 187. It is populated by Assyrians who speak the Mardin dialect of Arabic. (Note: For the use of the term "Syriac" to refer to the population of Qeleth. For use of the term "Assyrian". The terms "Syriac" and "Assyrian" are used to refer to the same group of people.) It is located by Mount Qoros in the historic region of Tur Abdin.

In the village, there is a church of Mor Yuhannon, a Syriac Catholic church of the Mother of God, and a Syriac Protestant church. The ruins of the monasteries of Mor Abay, Mor Theodotus, and Mor Dimet are also located near the village.

== History ==
The Monastery of Mor Abay at Qeleth (today called Dereiçi) was founded in either AD 370 or in the sixth century. The village is believed to have been destroyed in AD 577/578 by the Persians and subsequently repopulated by adherents of the Church of the East with a small community of Syriac Orthodox Christians. The village was returned to Roman control in 591. In the seventh century, the village belonged to the Roman diocese of Dara. The Church of Mor Yuhannon at Qeleth was constructed in the eighth century. (Note: Sinclair argues the Church of Mor Yuhannon was likely constructed in the late 7th century.) The village was under the jurisdiction of the Syriac Orthodox Maphrian of the East from 1042 onwards, according to the Chronicle of 1234. By 1481, there were monasteries of Mor Abai, Mor Theodotus, Mor Shabai, Mor Dimeṭ, and a hermitage of Mor Barṣawmo at the village.

Qeleth was the only village in the Mhallami tract that remained Christian and did not convert to Islam. It was part of the Syriac Orthodox diocese of the Monastery of Mor Abay until the death of its last bishop Isḥoq Ṣaliba in 1730, upon which the diocese was subsumed into the diocese of Mardin. There were 120 Syriac Orthodox families at the village when it was visited by Reverend George Percy Badger in 1850. Badger noted that they mostly spoke Arabic, as well as Kurdish and vernacular Syriac, and that the priests were illiterate. The Church of the Mother of God at Qeleth was opened in 1857. In the Syriac Orthodox patriarchal register of dues of 1870, it was recorded that the village had one hundred and six households, who paid one hundred and seventy-six dues, and it was served by the churches of Morī Šem'ūn Qonunoyō, Yūḥanun Delamoyō, and Yūldaṯ Alohō, four priests, and the monasteries of Morī Abay, Morī Tāwodotā, Morī Dīmiṭ, and Morī Šabay. Qeleth was attacked by Kurds in early November 1895 during the Hamidian massacres.

In 1914, 2500 Assyrians inhabited the village, as per the list presented to the Paris Peace Conference by the Assyro-Chaldean delegation. Two-thirds of the village's population adhered to the Syriac Orthodox Church whilst one third was Syriac Protestant. There were also Syriac Catholics. Amidst the Sayfo, on 3 June 1915, Kurds arrived at the village and 25 militiamen came under the pretence of having received orders to keep guard there. The village headmen Benjamin and his son were murdered as they returned to the village after having been taken to Diyarbakır. On 10 June, the villagers barricaded themselves inside large buildings, and some with guns were able to defend their homes, but most were killed. The Syriac Orthodox Christians who took refuge in their church were burned alive there. The women and children were abducted, over 200 homes were completely devastated, and over 2000 people were believed to have been slaughtered. The Syriac Orthodox priests Ibrahîm, Thomas, and Massud, and a monk named Abdallah were also amongst the dead.

Qeleth was inhabited by 871 people in 1960, including 600 Syriac Orthodox Christians, and were served by one priest and one church. The village's population declined in the 1970s due to emigration. Villagers historically emigrated to Latin America but have more recently moved to Germany and Sweden. In 1974, 20 Syriac Protestant families inhabited Qeleth. The Church of Mor Yuhannon was renovated in 2006 and reopened for worship on 23 July 2006. By 2013, 14–15 Assyrians in 5–6 families populated the village. There were only a few families remaining at Qeleth by 2022.

== Demography ==
The following is a list of the number of Syriac Orthodox families that have inhabited Qeleth per year stated. Unless otherwise stated, all figures are from the list provided in The Syrian Orthodox Christians in the Late Ottoman Period and Beyond: Crisis then Revival, as noted in the bibliography below.

- 1915: c. 200
- 1978: 62
- 1979: 58
- 1995: 7

== In popular culture ==
Qeleth was used as a filming location for the Turkish-language film Kapı (2019), which features an Assyrian family who return to the village after 25 years.

== Bibliography ==
- Barsoum, Aphrem (2003). The Scattered Pearls: A History of Syriac Literature and Sciences. Translated by Matti Moosa (2nd ed.). Gorgias Press.
- Bcheiry, Iskandar (2009). The Syriac Orthodox Patriarchal Register of Dues of 1870: An Unpublished Historical Document from the Late Ottoman Period. Gorgias Press.
- Bcheiry, Iskandar (2013). The Account of the Syriac Orthodox Patriarch Yūḥanun Bar Šay Allāh (1483–1492): The Syriac Manuscript of Cambridge: DD.3.8(1). Gorgias Press.
- Bizzeti, Paolo; Chialà, Sabino (2024). Turchia: Chiese e monasteri di tradizione siriaca (in Italian) (2nd ed.). Edizioni Terra Santa.
- Courtois, Sébastien de (2004). The Forgotten Genocide: Eastern Christians, The Last Arameans. Translated by Vincent Aurora. Gorgias Press.
- Courtois, Sébastien de (2013). "Tur Abdin : Réflexions sur l'état présent descommunautés syriaques du Sud-Est de la Turquie, mémoire, exils, retours". Cahier du Gremmamo (in French). 21: 113–150.
- Dinno, Khalid S. (2017). The Syrian Orthodox Christians in the Late Ottoman Period and Beyond: Crisis then Revival. Gorgias Press.
- Gaunt, David (2006). Massacres, Resistance, Protectors: Muslim-Christian Relations in Eastern Anatolia during World War I. Gorgias Press.
- Genç, Işılay; Aykal, Demet (2024). "Examining the Cultural Reflections in Monumental Building Facades: A Case Study of Mardin Dereiçi (Kıllıt) Village". Medeniyet Sanat Dergisi (in Turkish). 10 (1): 74–97.
- Hoyland, Robert G.; Palmer, Andrew N. (2023). The Life of Theodotus of Amida: Syriac Christianity under the Umayyad Caliphate. Gorgias Press.
- Jongerden, Joost; Verheij, Jelle, eds. (2012). Social Relations in Ottoman Diyarbekir, 1870-1915. Brill.
- Joseph, John (1983). Muslim-Christian Relations and Inter-Christian Rivalries in the Middle East: The Case of the Jacobites in an Age of Transition. SUNY Press.
- Karataş, Lale; Dal, Murat (2023). "Investigating the Geoenvironmental and Climatic Impacts on the Facades of Historical Houses in Killit (Dereiçi) Village, Mardin". Journal of Architectural Sciences and Applications. 8 (2): 1046–1061.
- Keser-Kayaalp, Elif, ed. (January 2022). Syriac Architectural Heritage at Risk in TurʿAbdin (PDF).
- Kiraz, George A. (2011). "Isḥoq Ṣaliba". Gorgias Encyclopedic Dictionary of the Syriac Heritage: Electronic Edition. Gorgias Press.
- Omtzigt, Pieter; Tozman, Markus K.; Tyndall, Andrea, eds. (2012). The Slow Disappearance of the Syriacs from Turkey and of the Grounds of the Mor Gabriel Monastery (PDF). LIT Verlag Münster.
- Palmer, Andrew (1990). Monk and Mason on the Tigris Frontier: The Early History of Tur Abdin. Cambridge University Press.
- Ritter, Hellmut (1967). Turoyo: Die Volkssprache der Syrischen Christen des Tur 'Abdin (in German). Vol. 1. Franz Steiner Verlag.
- Sinclair, T.A. (1989). Eastern Turkey: An Architectural & Archaeological Survey. Vol. III. Pindar Press.
- Travis, Hannibal, ed. (2018). The Assyrian Genocide: Cultural and Political Legacies (PDF). Routledge.
