= Cem Sultan =

Claimant to the Ottoman throne (1459–1495)

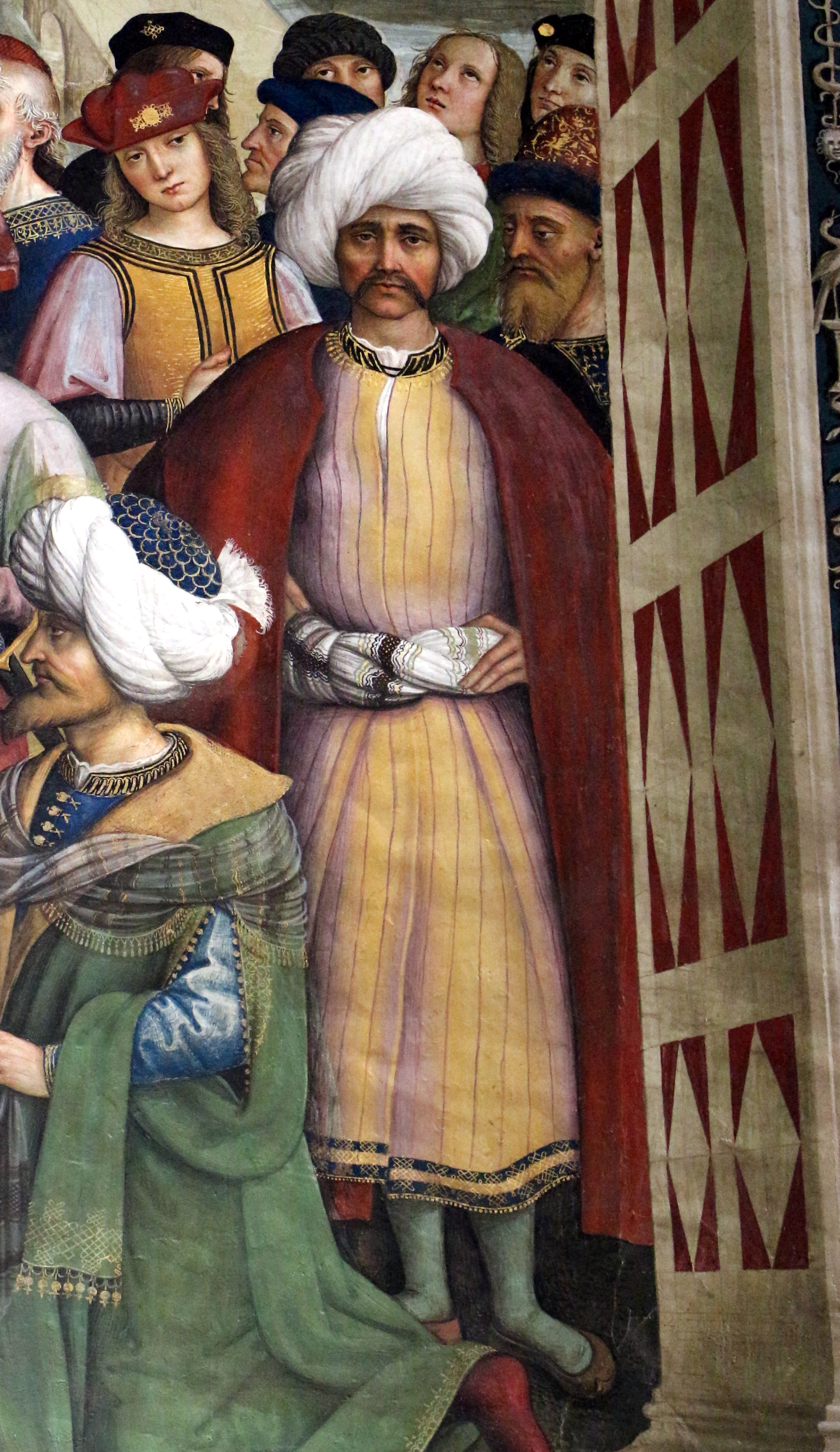
- Cem Sultan, by Pinturicchio, circa 1502-07.

Sultan of the Ottoman Empire (claimant)
- Reign: 28 May 1481 − 20 June 1481
- Opposing: Bayezid II

Sanjak-bey of Karaman
- Reign: 1474 – 1481

Sanjak-bey of Kastamonu
- Reign: 1469 – 1474
- Born: 22 December 1459; Adrianople Palace, Edirne, Rumelia, Ottoman Empire
- Died: 25 February 1495 (aged 35); Capua, Kingdom of Naples
- Burial: Muradiye Complex, Bursa, Turkey
- Consort: Gülşirin Hatun
- Issue: Şehzade Abdullah; Şehzade Oğuzhan; Şehzade Murad; Gevhermelik Hatun; Ayşe Hatun
Names
- Cem bin Meḥemmed Ḫān
- Dynasty: Ottoman
- Father: Mehmed II
- Mother: Çiçek Hatun
- Religion: Sunni Islam
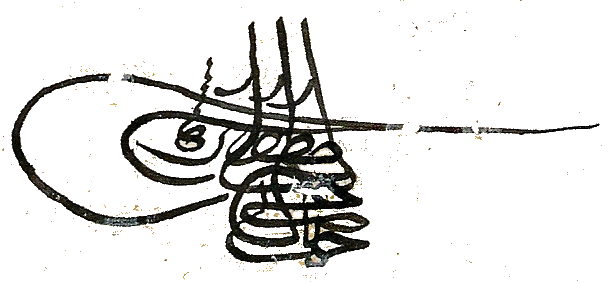
- Tughra

Cem Sultan (Turkish pronunciation: [ˈdʒem sulˈtaːn]; 22 December 1459 – 25 February 1495) was a claimant to the Ottoman throne in the 15th century.

Cem was the third son of Sultan Mehmed II and a younger half-brother of Sultan Bayezid II, and thus a half-uncle of Sultan Selim I of the Ottoman Empire. After being defeated by Bayezid, Cem went into exile in Egypt and Europe, under the protection of the Mamluks, the Knights Hospitaller on the island of Rhodes, and ultimately the Pope.

== Early life ==
Cem was born on 22 December 1459 in Edirne. His mother was Çiçek Hatun. In accordance with the custom for a Şehzade (prince), Cem was appointed to a provincial governorship of Kastamonu in 1469. In December 1474, Cem succeeded his deceased brother Mustafa as governor of Karaman in Konya.

== Succession dispute ==
At the death of Mehmed the Conqueror, on 3 May 1481, Bayezid was the governor of Sivas, Tokat and Amasya, and Cem ruled the provinces of Karaman and Konya. With no designated heir after Mehmed, conflict over succession to the throne erupted between Cem and Bayezid.

Contrary to Islamic law, which prohibits any unnecessary delay in burial, Mehmed II's body was transported to Constantinople, where it lay for three days. His grand vizier Karamanlı Mehmet Pasha – believing himself to be fulfilling the wishes of the recently deceased Sultan – attempted to arrange a situation whereby the younger son Cem, whose governing seat at Konya was closer than his brother Bayezid's seat at Amasya, would arrive in Constantinople prior to his older sibling and be able to claim the throne.

However, Bayezid had already established a political network of influential pashas (two of whom were his sons-in-law), the janissaries, and those opposed to the policies of Mehmed II and the grand vizier. In spite of Karamanlı Mehmet Pasha's attempts at secrecy, the Sultan's death and the grand vizier's plan were discovered by the Janissary corps, who supported Bayezid over Cem and had been kept out of the capital after the Sultan's death. As a result, the Janissary corps rebelled, entering the capital, and lynched the grand vizier.

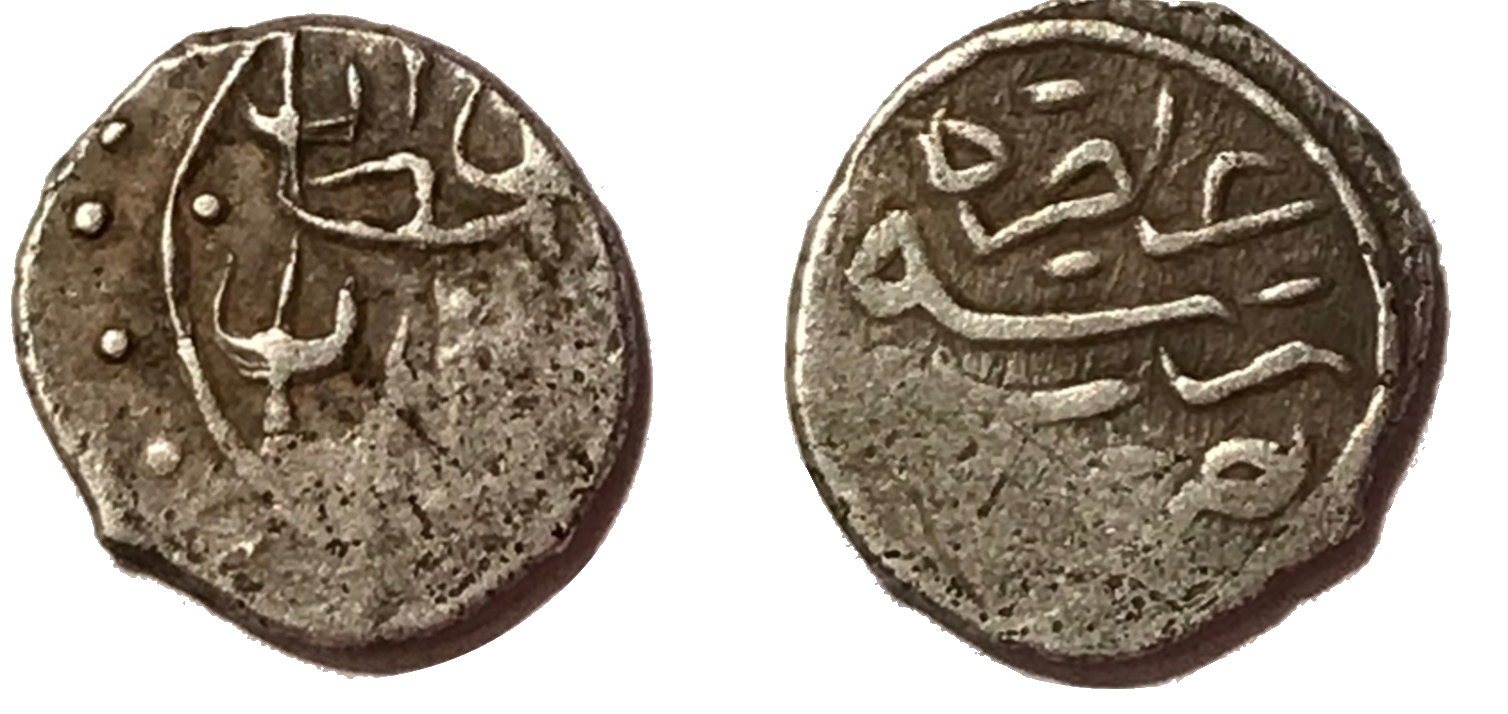
1481 dated akçe minted by Cem. On the obverse: "Sultan Cem son of Mehmed Khan" and on the reverse: "May his victory be glorious. Struck in Bursa, year 886 [AH]"

After the death of Karamanlı Mehmet Pasha, there was widespread rioting among the janissaries in Constantinople as there was neither a sultan nor a grand vizier to control the situation. Understanding the danger of the situation, former grand vizier Ishak Pasha took the initiative of beseeching Bayezid to arrive with all due haste. In the meantime, Ishak Pasha took the cautionary measure of proclaiming Bayezid's 11-year-old son, Şehzade (prince) Korkut, as regent until the arrival of his father.

Prince Bayezid arrived at Constantinople on 21 May 1481, and was declared Sultan Bayezid II. Only six days later, Cem captured the city of Inegöl with an army of 4,000. Sultan Bayezid sent his army under the command of vizier Ayas Pasha to kill his brother. On 28 May Cem had defeated Bayezid's army and declared himself Sultan of Anatolia, establishing his capital at Bursa. He proposed to divide the empire between him and his brother, leaving Bayezid the European side. Bayezid furiously rejected the proposal, declared that "between rulers there is no kinship," and marched on to Bursa. The decisive battle between the two contenders to the Ottoman throne took place on 19 June 1481, near the town of Yenişehir. Cem lost and fled with his family to the Mamluk Cairo.

== In Cairo ==
The Mamlūk sultan Qāʾit Bāy (r. 1468–1496) received Cem with honour in Cairo, and Cem took the opportunity to go on pilgrimage to Mecca, making him the only Ottoman prince to have made the pilgrimage.

In Cairo, Cem received a letter from his brother, offering Cem one million akçes (the Ottoman currency) to stop competing for the throne. Cem rejected the offer, and in the following year he launched a campaign in Anatolia under the support of Kasım Bey (Qāsım Beğ), heir of the ruling house of Karaman, and the sanjek bey of Ankara. On 27 May 1482 Cem besieged Konya but was soon defeated and forced to withdraw to Ankara. He intended to give it all up and return to Cairo but all of the roads to Egypt were under Bayezid's control. Cem then tried to renegotiate with his brother. Bayezid offered him a stipend to live quietly in Jerusalem but refused to divide the empire, prompting Cem to flee to Rhodes on 29 July 1482.

== Imprisonment ==
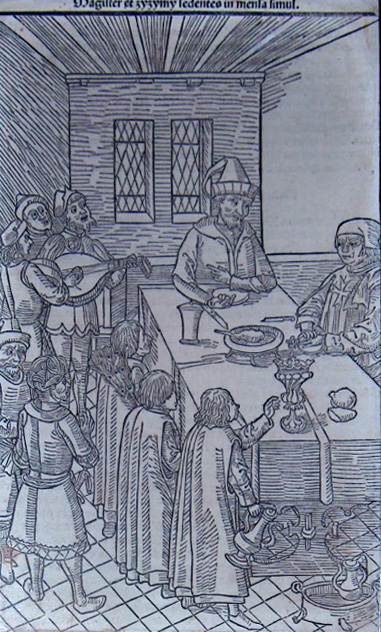
Cem Sultan (middle) and Pierre d'Aubusson at a dinner in Rhodes

=== Knights Hospitaller ===
Upon arriving at Rhodes, Cem asked the protection of the French captain of Bodrum Castle, Pierre d'Aubusson, grand master of the Knights of St. John, the Latin Catholic order on the island. On 29 July Cem arrived at Rhodes and was received with honor. In return for the overthrow of the new sultan Bayezid, Prince Cem offered perpetual peace between the Ottoman Empire and Christendom if he regained the Ottoman throne. However, Pierre d'Aubusson realized that conflict with Bayezid would be imprudent, so he secretly approached Bayezid, concluded a peace treaty, and then reached a separate agreement on Cem's captivity in March 1483. D'Aubusson promised Bayezid to detain Cem in return for an annual payment of 40,000 ducats for his maintenance.

Therefore, the Knights took the money and betrayed Cem, who thereafter became a well-treated prisoner at Rhodes. Afterwards, Cem was sent to the castle of Pierre d'Aubusson in France.

=== France ===
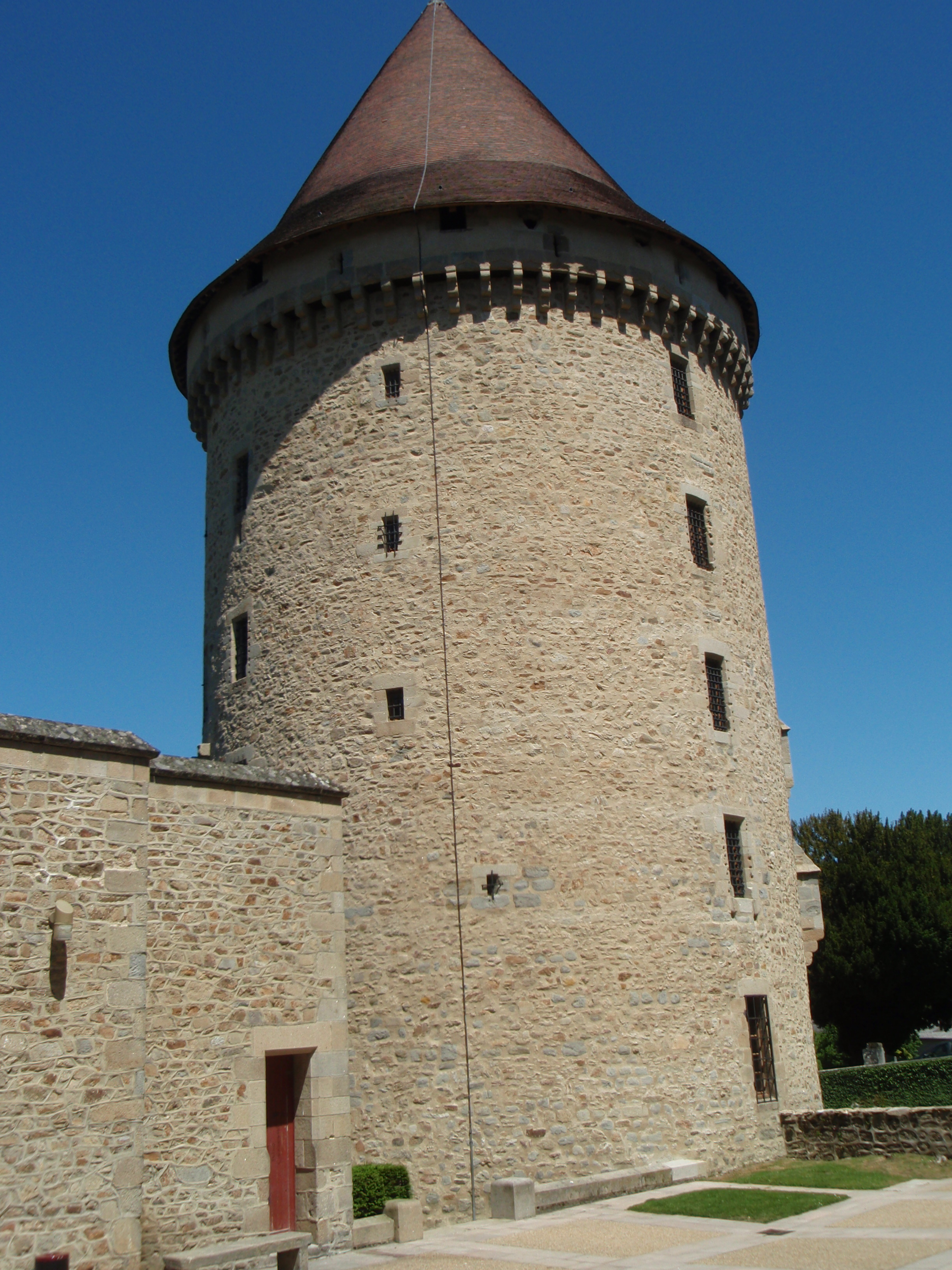
The Zizim Tower in Bourganeuf, France.

Cem had reached Nice, at that time in the Duchy of Savoy, on 17 October 1482, en route to Hungary, but the Knights were playing for time. After the agreement about his confinement was finalised, he became a hostage, as well as a potential pawn. Those who hoped to use his name and person to foment turmoil in the Ottoman realm included the Mamlūk sultan Qāʾit Bāy, Matthias Corvinus, king of Hungary, and Pope Innocent VIII. Others, such as the Knights of Saint John, the Venetians, the king of Naples, and Popes Innocent VIII and Alexander VI, viewed his presence in Europe as a deterrent to Ottoman aggression against Christendom and an opportunity for profit. For his part, Bayezid II dispatched ambassadors and spies to the West to assure that his rival was detained indefinitely, and he even attempted to eliminate him through assassination.

Cem spent a year in the Duchy of Savoy. After the death of King Louis XI of France (30 August 1483), who had refused to accept a Muslim in his lands, the Knights of Saint John transferred him to Limousin (D'Aubusson's birthplace). Cem spent the next five years there, mostly at Bourganeuf. He was well treated, but essentially a captive (a fortified tower was constructed to house him). Bayezid II negotiated both with D'Aubusson, to have Cem returned to Rhodes, and with representatives of the new French monarch, Charles VIII, to have him kept in France. When the king of Hungary and Pope Innocent VIII sought custody of the prince, the Pope prevailed, and Cem arrived in Rome on 13 March 1489.

=== Rome ===
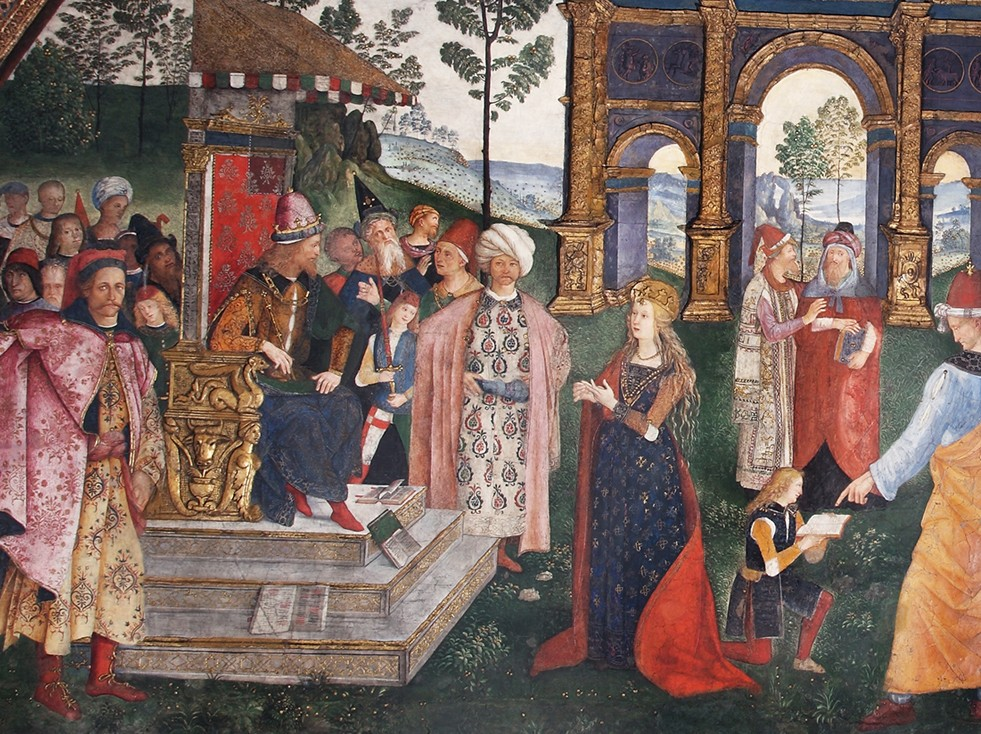
Cem in St Catherine's Disputation by Pinturicchio.

Innocent VIII rebuffed overtures from the Mamlūks and prepared to launch a crusade against the Ottomans, but it was postponed when Matthias Corvinus of Hungary died on 6 April 1490. These developments worried Bayezid, who contacted D'Aubusson and also sent Mustafa Bey (later a grand vizier) to Rome, to conclude a secret agreement, in December 1490. The sultan promised not to attack Rhodes, Rome, or Venice, as well as to pay Cem's allowance of 40,000 ducats to the Pope (10,000 of which were earmarked for the Knights of Saint John), in return for the prince's incarceration. Apparently, Cem found life in Rome more pleasant than in France, and he had lost hope of seizing the Ottoman throne, but he wanted to die in a Muslim land. His wish would not be realized.

Pope Innocent VIII unsuccessfully attempted to use Cem to begin a new crusade against the Ottomans. The Pope also tried to convert Cem to Christianity, without success. Cem's presence in Rome was useful nevertheless, because whenever Bayezid intended to launch a military campaign against Christian nations of the Balkans, the Pope would threaten to release his brother.

In exchange for maintaining the custody of Cem, Bayezid paid Innocent VIII 120,000 crowns (at the time, equal to all other annual sources of papal revenue combined), a relic of the Holy Lance (which allegedly had pierced the side of Christ), one hundred Moorish slaves, and an annual fee of 45,000 ducats. Much of the costs associated with the Sistine Chapel were paid with funds from the Ottoman ransoms.

== Death ==
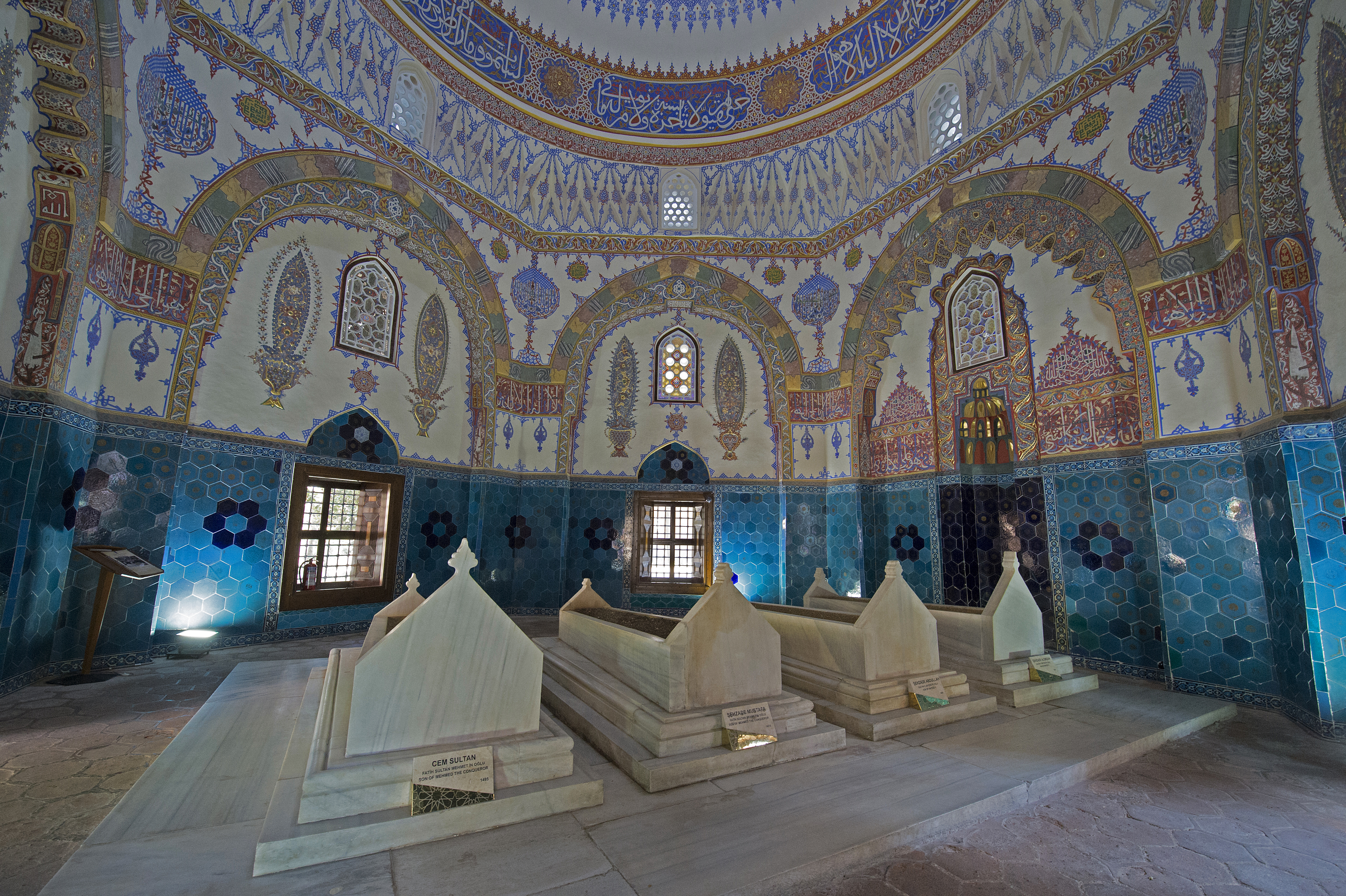
Tomb of Cem Sultan alongside his brother Mustafa

In 1494, Charles VIII invaded Italy, to take possession of the Kingdom of Naples, and also announced a crusade against the Turks. He compelled Pope Alexander VI to surrender Cem, who left Rome with the French army on 28 January 1495. The prince died in Naples on 24 February.

It is rumored that he was poisoned by the Pope who was forced to give up his valuable hostage.

Sultan Bayezid declared national mourning for three days. He also requested to have Cem's body for an Islamic funeral, but it was not until four years after Cem's death that his body was finally brought to the Ottoman lands because of attempts to receive more gold for Cem's corpse. He was buried in Bursa.

== Legacy ==
=== Personality ===
Cem had two diwans written in Turkish and Persian, and he also spoke Arabic.

=== Depictions of Cem ===
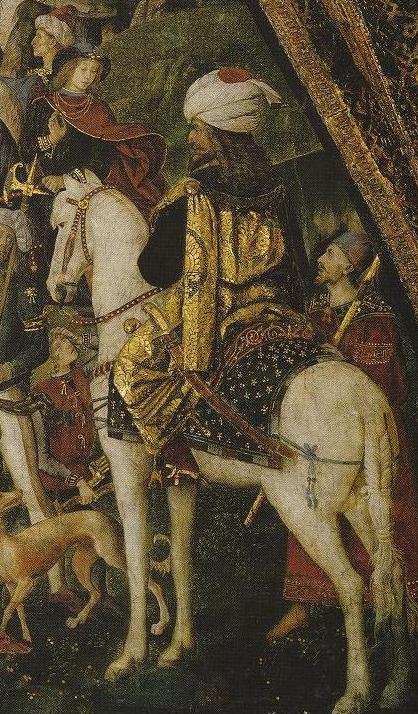
A man on horseback, possibly Cem, by The Borgia Apartments, by Pinturicchio

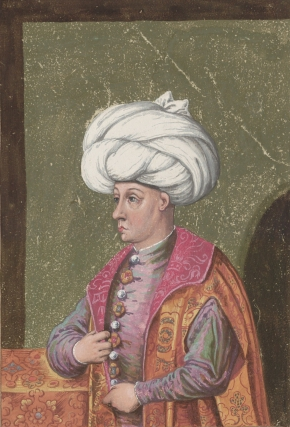
Portrait of Cem Sultan, 1586

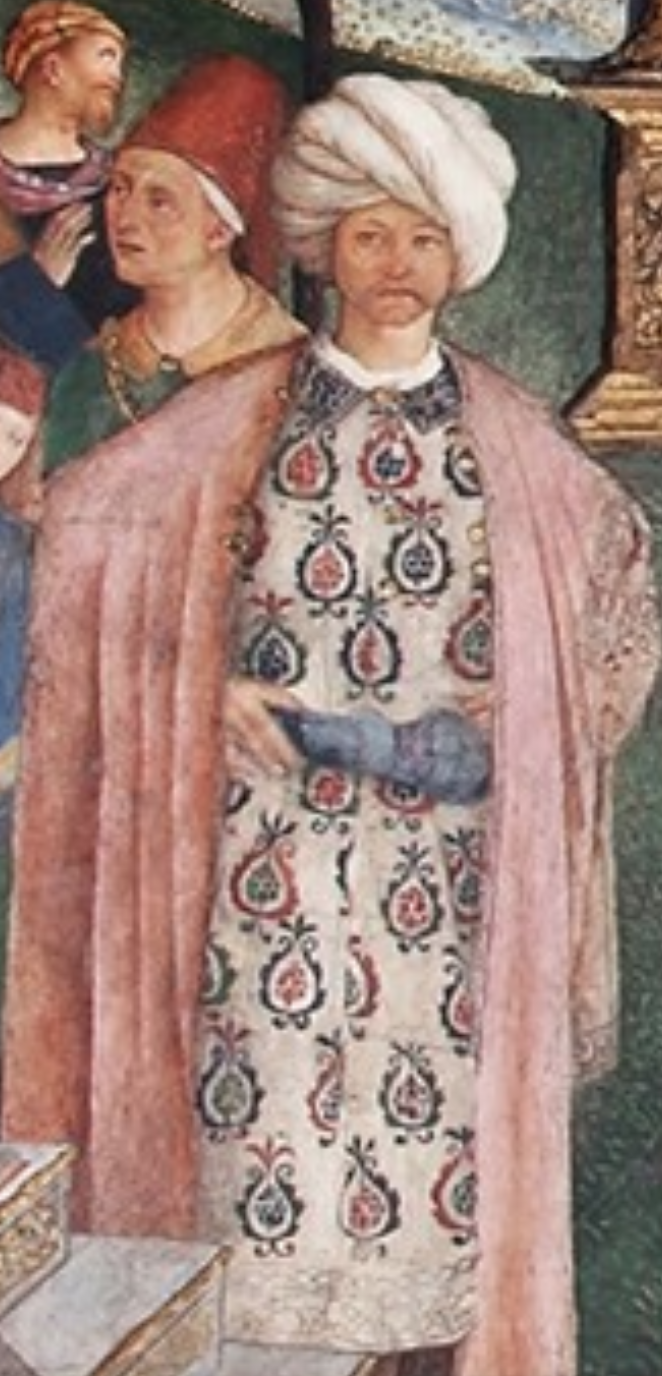
Cem Sultan in St Catherine's Disputation.

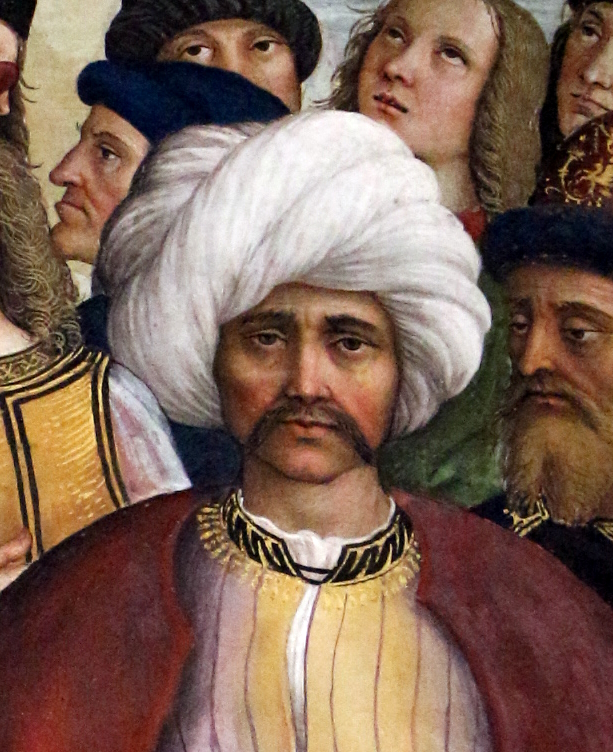
Portrait of Cem, Pinturicchio, 1502-07.

== Family ==
=== Consorts ===
It's known only one of Cem's consort:

- Gülşirin Hatun.

=== Sons ===
Cem had at least three sons:

- Şehzade Abdullah (executed by Bayezid II, 1481, buried in Orhan's türbe, Bursa).
- Şehzade Oğuzhan (executed by Bayezid II, Constantinople, 1482), called also Şehzade Oğuz. His name was given to him by his grandfather, Sultan Mehmed II, in honor of Oghuz Khan, the legendary forefather of the Oghuz Turks and a central figure in Turkic mythology.
- Şehzade Murad (executed by Suleiman the Magnificent, Rhodes, December 1522), later Pierre Mehmed Sayd; married and had four sons and three daughters.

=== Daughters ===
Cem had at least two daughters:

- Gevhermelik Hatun, called also Gevhermuluk Hatun, married firstly in 1496 Sultan An-Nasir Muhammad, son of Qaitbay (d. 1498), married secondly in 1503 Sinan Pasha, Beylerbey of Anatolia;
- Ayşe Hatun, married in 1503 Mehmed Bey, son of Sinan Pasha, Sanjak-bey of Ioannina

== Treatments and references ==
=== In literature ===
In the 1490s, a book in Latin was written about Cem's life. It was illustrated by Guillaume Caoursin, vice-chancellor of the Knights Hospitaller. It was published in several European cities that possessed printing capability: Venice, Paris, Bruges, Salamanca, Ulm and London. The many illustrations in the book are the first accurately described representations in Western Europe of costumes and weapons of the Turkish people.

An account of Cem's captivity—and of the political machinations that kept him captive—forms the basis of the historical novel, Francesca: Les Jeux du Sort (1872), written by the Haitian writer and political exile, Demesvar Delorme.

Cem's life also served as inspiration for a character in the book The Damned Yard (1954) by the Yugoslav Nobelist writer Ivo Andrić. It is widely considered to be one of his masterpieces and has been translated into over 30 languages. Cem Sultan appears as one of the main characters in a multiple-layered narration and serves as a metaphor for the human condition.

Bulgarian Ottoman historian Vera Mutafchieva, inspired by Cem Sultan's importance in European politics of the 15th century, wrote a novel (The Case of Cem) about him in 1967. The book strives for historical accuracy and has been translated into Turkish, German, Romanian, Polish, Russian, Czech, Slovak, Hungarian, French, Estonian, Greek and Croatian. An English translation by Angela Rodel was published in 2024.

=== In film ===
In 1951, was released historical film Cem Sultan, which main protagonist was portrayed by Bülent Ufuk.

In 1969 was released historical adventure film Malkoçoğlu Cem Sultan, which directed by Remzi Aydın Jöntürk, the character of Cem Sultan, was portrayed by Cihangir Ghaffari.

=== In television ===
- In the Showtime series The Borgias, Cem is played by British actor Elyes Gabel, and is depicted in Rome under the papacy of Innocent VIII's successor, Pope Alexander VI. He is also portrayed to have sought to convert to Christianity, and to have been assassinated by Alexander VI's son, Juan Borgia.
- In the Canal+ series Borgia, the character of Cem, played by Nicolás Belmonte, dies from fever when traveling with Cesare Borgia in Charles' campaign against Naples.
- In the MBC series Kingdoms of Fire, Cem fought against Bayezid II, then he sought refuge with the crusaders, who agreed to host him in exchange to annual tribute from the Ottoman Sultan.

=== In video games ===
- In Assassin's Creed: Revelations, Cem was mentioned to possess an Apple of Eden, then he became a Templar acquainted with Rodrigo Borgia, however, he was eventually killed by the Assassins.
