= Kapı (film) =

2019 Turkish drama film

Door
- Kapı
- Directed by: Nihat Durak
- Written by: Filiz Üstün Durak
- Produced by: Önder Köse; Filiz Üstün Durak
- Starring: Kadir İnanır; Vahide Perçin; Timur Acar; Erdal Beşikçioğlu; Aybüke Pusat; Sermet Yeşil; Nilay Erdönmez; Özgün Çoban; Reyhan Özdilek; Engin Yüksel; Sinan Helvacı
- Cinematography: Eyüp Boz
- Music by: Guldiyar Tanridagli
- Production companies: TAFF Pictures; Durak Film
- Distributed by: CJ Entertainment Turkey
- Release date: April 11, 2019
- Running time: 110 min
- Country: Turkey
- Language: Turkish
- Box office: 254,212 Turkish lira

Kapı is a Turkish language drama film released in 2019. The film was directed by Turkish director Nihat Durak, while its script was written by Filiz Üstün Durak.

The film starred Turkish actors Vahide Perçin and Kadir İnanır, the latter starring as part of his first film appearance after a 7-year hiatus and his last before retirement. Actors Timur Acar, Erdal Beşikçioğlu, and Aybüke Pusat also starred and played leading roles in the film.

== Plot ==
Woodworker Yakup (played by Kadir İnanır), as well as his family, are ethnic Assyrians that migrated from Mardin to Berlin, Germany. He and his wife, Şemsa (played by Vahide Perçin) moved abroad due to their son Mikhael being killed by unidentified gunmen 25 years prior, with his body not being found. One day during a birthday celebration, Yakup receives a call, and so the family travel to Mardin alongside their granddaughter Nardin (played by Aybüke Pusat) from Germany for identification.

The film confronts Assyrian history in Turkey and the journey of "returning home" as Yakup finds that the door he made with Mikhael for their old house is missing. The family travels to Istanbul as Yakup's wish is to retrieve the door and his son's legacy.

== Cast ==
- Kadir İnanır as Yakup
- Vahide Perçin as Şemsa
- Timur Acar as Remzi
- Erdal Beşikçioğlu as Efrem
- Aybüke Pusat as Nardin
- Sermet Yeşil as Sain
- Nilay Erdönmez as Asya
- Özgün Çoban as Samuel
- Reyhan Özdilek as Harran
- Engin Yüksel as Ahment
- Sinan Helvacı as Musa

== Production ==
The film was shot primarily in Germany, as well as in the districts of Midyat and Savur, specifically in the village of Qelet.

== Release ==
The film premiered in Istanbul in April 2019. The film also had a special premiere event in Diyarbakır, with İnanır present as well as government officials from Mardin.

Kapı headlined the 19th Frankfurt Turkish Film Festival in 2019, and was broadcast alongside other Turkish films of that year.

== Reception ==
On Beyazperde, a Turkish cinema website, the film currently holds a score of 2.9/5 from press reviews and 3.7/5 from the site's users. During the premiere of the film, many of its actors expressed their satisfaction with the movie, with one of its actors, Menderes Samancılar. stating "I think the project opens the door to pain. The important thing is that it allows us all to look through this gap." The film was received mostly well among audiences, especially the Assyrian community.

Kadir İnanır, as a result of his participation in the film, received criticism from both Turkish nationalists and Turkish government officials.

=== Awards ===
Kapı won the Audience Award at the 2019 Adana Golden Boll Film Festival.
