= Fatmagül'ün Suçu ne? =

2010 Turkish drama series

- Created by: Vedat Türkali
- Written by: Ece Yörenç; Melek Gençoğlu
- Directed by: Hilal Saral
- Starring: Beren Saat; Engin Akyürek
- Composer: Toygar Işıklı
- Country of origin: Turkey
- Original language: Turkish
- No. of seasons: 2
- No. of episodes: 80

Production
- Production location: İzmir
- Running time: 90 min
- Production company: Ay Yapım

Original release
- Network: Kanal D
- Release: 16 September 2010 – 21 June 2012

Fatmagül'ün Suçu ne? (transl. What is Fatmagül's Fault?) is a Turkish television drama series produced by Ay Yapım and broadcast on Kanal D. The series is based on Vedat Türkali's scenario, unter the same title as Fatmagül'ün Suçu ne?, which was then made into a film in 1986, Hülya Avşar as Fatmagül. The series is written by the duo Ece Yörenç and Melek Gençoğlu. The soundtrack was composed and conducted by Toygar Işıklı. It tells the story of a woman who falls victim to a group rape and is then forced to marry one of the men that was present during the event.

== Plot ==
Fatmagül Ketenci (Beren Saat) is a lower-class dairy-farm girl who lives in the village Ildır on the Aegean coast belonging to the administrative district of Çeşme, in İzmir Province, with her brother Rahmi (who is cognitively impaired) (Bülent Seyran), his son and his wife Mukaddes (Esra Dermancıoğlu) who despises her. Fatmagül plans to marry her childhood love Mustafa (Fırat Çelik), a fisherman. They are only waiting for Mustafa to earn enough money to finish their house construction before the wedding. Then there is the Yaşaran family (rich family that tries to hide the fact that two of its sons raped Fatmagül) that is in İzmir for the engagement ceremony of the son of the elder brother Reşat Yaşaran (Musa Uzunlar) to the daughter of a politician. Selim (Engin Öztürk) is his son and Erdoğan (Kaan Taşaner) his nephew. These cousins have a third friend, Vural (Buğra Gülsoy) who also belongs to the upper-class. All these three have spent their childhood in İzmir but as the businesses of their fathers grew, they moved to Istanbul. They have a childhood friend in İzmir, whom they meet on a yearly basis when they come there for summer vacations, whose name is Kerim Ilgaz (Engin Akyürek).

Kerim Ilgaz is a well-mannered man, a blacksmith apprentice by profession and he lives with his aunt Meryem Aksoy (Sumru Yavrucuk), known affectionately as "Ebe Nine", who is a homeopath. Kerim was orphaned during childhood so Meryem brought him up as her own son. He works as a carpenter in the workshop of his father's friend.

Fatmagül is desperate to be married-off to Mustafa, not only because she loves him but also to get rid away from her nagging sister-in-law. Her desire for Mustafa and an independent married life is growing with time as Mukaddes' hatred is growing towards her. Except for Mustafa, she has no one to share her feelings with. While in İzmir, Erdoğan, Selim, Vural and Kerim see Fatmagül and the three rich men ogle and tease her. Kerim doesn't like this. Then at Selim's engagement, Kerim comes face-to-face with her as she is working there with her sister-in-law.

The big event of the season is the engagement of Selim, to the politician Turaner Alagöz's (Aziz Sarvan) daughter Meltem (Seda Güven). Kerim after attending Selim's engagement, joins his friends for an after-party. All four go for drinking and drug binge near the sea. Mustafa is leaving for a night fish-catch. Fatmagül is coming to see him off. She passes from the area where the drunk boys are singing. Kerim sees her and on recognizing her shouts to his friends "Guys! It's the same girl!!" Then when she tries to run, Kerim gets hold of her while the other three come near her.

The tragedy occurs. Fatmagül is gang-raped. The four boys are shown to be involved in the crime as she faints when Kerim comes on her. The next morning, a traumatized Fatmagül is discovered by Ebe Nine while she is picking herbs. The four boys have already left the crime scene. Kerim drops off Selim and Erdoğan at their place and himself goes with Vural to his house. Kerim is left deeply disturbed by the event and is even more distressed to know that the girl has been rescued by his mother. The rich boys are confident in the power of their rich fathers and are sure to be saved. As Mukaddes approaches the Yaşarans threatening of giving their name to the police (as she had found Selim's engagement ring at the rape-scene), with the course of events, the Yaşarans save their sons and forcefully marry Kerim to Fatmagül. Kerim accepts the blame of solely raping Fatmagül for protecting his friends and also because he believes himself to be guilty. Mukaddes is their accomplice in all this. Mustafa is hurt primarily because of his fiancé being raped. He burns their half-finished house in front of Fatmagül because he believes Yaşaran's false stories that Fatmagül has been having an affair with Kerim from the beginning. Fatmagül and Kerim's families sell their properties and move to İstanbul to start a new life.

The story develops in Istanbul. Fatmagül hates Kerim. She insults him, abuses him, spits at him, tries to kill him, etc. Kerim is not sure whether he really raped her, as he was drunk and drugged. But Fatmagül believes that he did it as his was the last face she saw before fainting. Then Vural who is having little traumas of guilt, tells Kerim what he knows that; Kerim did not rape Fatmagül. In fact, when she laid there and fainted, he just sat beside her. Kerim tells this to Fatmagül. She believes it but it is of no importance for her as she hates him and considers him as much as culprit as the other three.

Things become complicated due to the exploitations of the Yaşarans and their unscrupulous lawyer, Münir Telci (Murat Daltaban), who wants to protect them, as well as Mustafa, who seeks revenge on Kerim. As a result, both the Yaşarans and Mustafa start harassing Kerim, Fatmagül and their relatives. Kerim, realizing his presence causes Fatmagül a lot of pain, prepares to leave and divorce her as she desires. Just before he leaves, Kerim realizes that he loves Fatmagül, and that it was love at first sight. He writes a letter to her, telling her to move on in her life and that one day he will come and ask for forgiveness from her.

Fatmagül reads this letter. Later-on the viewers are shown that this was the moment when Fatmagül fell in love with Kerim as his words softened her heart for him and she believed him. Kerim returns and Fatmagül gradually begins to trust him more.

One day, Vural overhears Erdoğan's plan to get rid of Mustafa and Kerim forever. He requests a meeting with Kerim to warn him. Fatmagül, on a passing bus, sees Vural hug Kerim goodbye and her trust in Kerim dissolves. She believes he is still conspiring with her rapists. In order to prove his innocence and love for her, Kerim files her rape case and asks the police to arrest him, Vural and the Yaşarans, after which Fatmagül finally accepts his of being honest with her. Mustafa finds out the truth and asks Fatmagül to forgive him, but she rejects him. The Yaşarans bribe Mustafa to not divulge the truth to the police and he becomes a greedy co-conspirator in the Yaşarans' attempts to obstruct justice. During the first trial, the Yaşarans falsify their testimonies. They also resort to using several bribed witnesses. Vural then is accidentally killed by Mustafa.

In the second season, Fatmagül also confesses her love for Kerim. After the Yaşarans forcefully protect Mustafa against Fatmagül, he abducts her, stating he loves her more than Kerim and that he regrets leaving her. Kerim eventually rescues his wife and they escape. Mustafa is arrested and imprisoned for his crimes. At the wedding of Kerim and Fatmagül, Mustafa intentionally tries to escape from police custody and is therefore, shot to death. Meanwhile, Selim and Erdoğan surreptitiously move to Malta where they briefly hide from the authorities. However, they are extradited to Istanbul after Erdoğan engages in a fight at a nightclub and is arrested.

Eventually, Fatmagül confronts them in court and they are charged for their part in her rape, essentially bringing down the Yaşaran empire. The series ends with Fatmagül and Kerim expecting their first child. In the final scene, they walk down the street in İzmir holding hands, expressing that their love cannot be shaken despite the difficult challenges they faced and that when a woman is strong like Fatmagül and has the support of a strong husband like Kerim, even a crime like 'rape' cannot escape justice.

== Characters ==
Role	Actor	Character
Fatmagül Ilgaz (née Ketenci)	Beren Saat	A beautiful and naive village girl who was raped by Erdoğan, Selim, and Vural. Was engaged to Mustafa. In order to save the honour of her family she is forced to marry Kerim. Later falls in love with him.
Kerim Ilgaz	Engin Akyürek	A blacksmith who falls in love with Fatmagül at first sight. Erdoğan, Selim, and Vural friend. He was present during the incident and was later forced by Yaşaran's family to take the blame for her rape. He marries Fatmagül to protect her. Later supports her in the fight against her rapists.
Selim Yaşaran	Engin Öztürk	Son of Reşat Yaşaran. Meltem Alagöz ex- husband. He took part in Fatmagül's rape.
Erdoğan Yaşaran	Kaan Taşaner	Nephew of the wealthy businessman, Reşat Yaşaran. Jealous of Selim, hates his uncle Reşat but secretly wants to be like him. He raped Fatmagül and later stalked her and threatened her. Blackmailed Mustafa and led to suicide Turaner Alagöz.
Vural Namlı	Buğra Gülsoy	Kerim's friend. Also took part in Fatmagül's rape. After the rape he regrets his actions and is left with a scattered psyche. Later he wants to confess and even apologized to Fatmagül, but Yaşaran's pressurize him to keep quiet. He was accidentally killed by Mustafa.
Mustafa Nalçalı	Fırat Çelik	Halide and Emin's son. Fatmagül’s first love. After she’s rapes, he breaks off their engagement but can't forget her. He worked for the Yaşaran family and ended up blackmailing them. Swore to take revenge on the rapists and Kerim. He accidentally kills Vural following a confrontation. He shot Kerim and had an affair with Meltem Alagöz. He later marries Hacre Ovacık (Asu) but never loves her. After Fatmagül and Kerim’s wedding, he commits suicide by cop, making sure they would shoot him.
Reşat Yaşaran	Musa Uzunlar	Selim's father, Erdoğan's uncle, and Rıfat's brother. He is a wealthy businessman who tries to cover his family's crimes, including the rape of Fatmagül. Blackmailed Mustafa and led to suicide Turaner Alagöz. Suffers a stroke late in the series due to stress.
Meryem Aksoy Pakalın	Sumru Yavrucuk	Kerim's adoptive mother who raised him. Affectionately known as "Ebe Nine" ("Granny Ebe").
Münir Telci	Murat Daltaban	Selim's maternal uncle and is also the Yasaran's family lawyer. Forced Fatmagül to marry Kerim, blackmailed Mustafa.
Asu(de) / Hacer Ovacık / Hacer Nalçalı	Sevtap Özaltun	Previously worked as a prostitute. Madly in love with Mustafa. Even after she learned all his crimes she still marries him. Later, heartbroken she told everything to Fatmagül and the police. Gives birth to Mustafa child Murat.
Meltem Alagöz/ Yaşaran	Seda Guven	Selim's ex-wife. After learning of her husband's actions, she divorces him and becomes an ally to Fatmagül. Had an affair with Mustafa.
Galip	Salih Zeki Yorulmaz	Kerim's blacksmith teacher. Dies in a car accident. Fahrettin Ilgaz friend.
Perihan Yaşaran / Telci	Deniz Türkali	Selim's mother, Reşat's wife, Münir's sister. Later turns on her husband after learning of his attempts to cover up crimes committed by Selim and Erdoğan Yaşaran.
Kadir Pakalın	Civan Canova	Fatmagül's lawyer. A lawyer and a father-figure to Kerim. Eventually falls in love and marries Meryem Aksoy.
Mukaddes Ketenci	Esra Dermancıoğlu	Rahmi's wife and Fatmagül's sister-in-law. Used to scheme against Fatmagül and the whole family.
Rahmi Ketenci	Bülent Seyran	Fatmagül's brother and Mukaddes' husband.
Ender Alagöz	Veda Yurtsever İpek	Meltem's mother.
Turaner Alagöz	Aziz Sarvan	Meltem's father. Commits suicide by Yaşaran's fault.
Rıfat Yaşaran	Mehmet Uslu	Erdoğan's father. Dies from a heart attack. His son blames Reşat Yaşaran for his death.
Leman Namlı	Servet Pandur	Vural's mother. After her son and her husband die, she commits suicide.
Şemsi Namlı	Zühtü Erkan	Vural's father. Dies in a car accident.
Halide Nalçalı	Sacide Taşaner	Mustafa's mother. Convince Mustafa to leave Fatmagül after the rape but later regrets it. Dies of illness.
Emin Nalçalı	Toygun Ateş	Mustafa's father. Dies of a heart attack.
Hilmiye Yaşaran	Deniz Baytaş	Erdoğan's mother.
Sami Khaner	Alper Saylik	A taxi driver and Asu's pimp, though later becomes her friend. He eventually falls in love with her.
Ömer Akari	Alper Kut	Kerim's lawyer and Kadir's friend.
Emre	Emre Yetim	Kerim's and Fatmagül's friend. Had a crush on Asu, later on Deniz.
Fahrettin Ilgaz	Serdar Gökhan	Kerim and Deniz father who lives in Australia. Comes back to Istanbul to help Kerim and Fatmagül.
Deniz Ilgaz	Gözde Kocaoğlu	Kerim's half-Turkish, half-Australian sister.
Gaye	Nilay Kaya	Meltem's cousin, Erdoğan and Münir's love interest.
Kristen Norton	Clare Louise Frost	An Englishwoman and Kerim's ex-fling.
Murat Ketenci	Ata Yılmaz Önal	Mukaddes' son; Rahmi's adaptive son.
Salih Mercanli	Ali Yigit	Murat's biological father.
Dr. Nil Yörgen	Bengü Ergin	Erdoğan's love interest. Later becomes an ally to Fatmagül.
Ayçe	Burçin Abdulla	helps Selim and Erdogan escape to Malta. Later falls in love with Selim.

== Series overview ==
Season	Number of episodes	Episodes	Season premiere	Season finale	Time of broadcasting (EET)	TV season	TV channel
1	39	1-39	16 September 2010	16 June 2011	20:00	2010-2011	Kanal D
2	41	40-80	8 September 2011	21 June 2012	21:00	2011-2012	Kanal D

== International broadcasts ==
Fatmagül gained a lot of popularity in Turkey, India, Bangladesh, Pakistan, Azerbaijan, Iran, Arabic countries and many other countries all around the world. It also dubbed in many languages notably Persian.

- Bangladesh on Deepto TV with the title ফাতমাগুল (Fatmagul)
- India on Zee Zindagi with the title of Fatmagul
- Pakistan on Urdu 1 with the title of فاطمہ گل - آخر میرا قصور کیا؟ (Fatma gul - After all what is my fault?)
- Albania on Albanian Screen with the title Fatmagyl
- Bosnia on BHT1 with the title Izgubljena čast
- Israel on Viva with the title פטמגול (Fatmagul)
- Saudi Arabia on MBC4 With the title فاطمة (Fatma)
- (Arab League) Arab World on Fox with the title فاطمة (Fatma)
- Afghanistan on Tolo TV with the title Fatima Gul
- Bulgaria on BTV, BTV Lady with the title Пепел от рози (in English: Ashes of Roses)
- Croatia on Nova TV with the title Izgubljena čast (Lost Honor)
- Serbia on Prva TV with the title Izgubljena čast (Lost Honor)
- Montenegro on TV Vijesti with the title Izgubljena čast (Lost Honor)
- France on TV5Monde with the title Fatmagul
- Georgia on Imedi TV with the title უდანაშაულო
- Greece on Mega Channel with the title Fatmagul
- Kosovo on RTV21 with the title Fatmagyl
- Iran on GEM/River with the title فاطماگل
- Lebanon on LBCI with the title Fatma
- Spain on Nova with the title Fatmagul
- Russia on STS with the title Без вины виноватая (Guilty Without Guilt)
- England on Turkish Dramas with the title What is Fatmagul's Fault?
- Indonesia on ANTV with the title Fatmagul
- Morocco on medi 1 with the title فاطمة (Fatma)
- Macedonia on Sitel TV with the title Судбината на Фатмаѓул (Fatmagul destiny)
- Estonia on Kanal 2 with the title Süütu süüdlane (Innocent Culprit)
- Ukraine on 1+1 with the title У чому вина Фатмагюль? (Where is Fatmagul fault?)
- Slovakia on TV Doma with the title Fatmagul
- Lithuania on LNK with the title Be kaltės kalta (Guilty Without Guilt)
- Chile on Mega with the title ¿Qué culpa tiene Fatmagül? (What is Fatmagul's Fault?)
- Argentina on Telefé with the title ¿Qué culpa tiene Fatmagül? (What is Fatmagul's Fault?)
- Slovenia on Planet TV with the title Fatmagul
- Peru on Frecuencia Latina with the title ¿Qué culpa tiene Fatmagül? (What is Fatmagul's Fault?)
- Czech on Prima Love with the title Krásná fatmagul (Beautiful Fatmagul)
- Brazil on Rede Bandeirantes with the title Fatmagül - A Força do Amor
- Ethiopia on Kana TV with the title ቅጣት
- Puerto Rico on WAPA-TV and Telemundo PR with the title ¿Qué culpa tiene Fatmagül? (What is Fatmagul's Fault?)
- Honduras on Canal 5 with the title ¿Qué culpa tiene Fatmagül? (What is Fatmagul's Fault?)
- Romania on Kanal D with the title Fatmagül
- Hungary on TV2 with the title Fatmagül
- Poland on TVP 1 with the title Grzech Fatmagül
- South Africa on eExtra with the title FATMAGÜL in English dubbed
- Belgium on RTL Play with the title Fatmagül
- Mexico on Azteca Uno and Nu9ve with the title ¿Qué culpa tiene Fatmagül?
- United States on UniMás and Visión Latina with the title ¿Qué culpa tiene Fatmagül?
- Tanzania on Azam TV with the title Fatmagul

== Reception ==
=== Iran and Afghanistan ===
Turkish television drama is popular in Iran, where they are dubbed into Persian. The song "Roozhaye Tanhaei" by Iranian singer Ava Bahram has been prepared and performed for the title track of the series Fatmagul. The most popular Turkish show is Fatmagül'ün Suçu ne?.

=== Southeastern Europe ===
In Kosovo, the most popular TV shows in December 2012 were Fatmagül'ün Suçu ne?, which ranked top of all programmes and Aşk ve Ceza (Love and Punishment), which came in third according to data by Index Kosova. In Serbia, research from January 2013 indicates that the top two Turkish shows in TV were Muhteşem Yüzyıl, which ranked fourth, and Öyle Bir Geçer Zaman Ki (As Time Goes By), which came in seventh. Fatmagul was one of the most popular shows in Macedonia which irked the government to pass a bill to restrict broadcasts of Turkish series during the day and at prime time in order to reduce the Turkish impact on Macedonian society.

=== Bangladesh ===
The Bangla dubbed version of Fatmagul was broadcast on Deepto TV in June 2019. It became one of the most popular Turkish series in Bangladesh.

=== Ethiopia ===
Fatmagül'ün Suçu ne? was well received by Ethiopians due to the popularity of other Turkish dramas that had been previously shown in Ethiopia. Fatmagül'ün Suçu ne? was dubbed in Amharic with title "ቅጣት" or "kitat" and aired on Kana TV.

=== Pakistan ===
Fatmagül'ün Suçu ne? was the second most popular Turkish series in Pakistan which was ranked top in 2013 above all Pakistani shows. The series averaged 16% TV ratings with the viewership above 25 million in Pakistani urban and rural market. Aşk-ı Memnu, was the highest rated Turkish series which broke all records in 2012.

=== Arab world ===
In 2013, the most popular Turkish shows worldwide were Fatmagül'ün Suçu ne?, Aşk-ı Memnu and Muhteşem Yüzyıl. Fatmagül'ün Suçu ne? has increased the popularity of Istanbul as a tourist destination among Arabs. With Aşk-ı Memnu's popularity Beren Saat became the female sensation in Arab television which led to a generally higher viewership for Fatmagul.

=== Chile ===
Binbir Gece and Fatmagül'ün Suçu ne? remain the two most watched Turkish shows in Chile.

== International remake ==
- In India the show has been remade by Indian TV channel Star Plus in Hindi under the title of Kya Kasoor Hai Amla Ka. This is the first official remake of the series. The show aired from 3 April 2017 during the noon slot. The show features Pankhuri Awasthy as Amala (Fatmagul), Anant Joshi as Dev (Mustafa) and Rajveer Singh as Abeer (Kerim). The original show titled Fatmagul first aired on Zindagi TV and became a rating success and thus the remake was commissioned.
- A Spanish remake called Alba was released in 2021. The show stars Elena Rivera as Alba (Fatmagul).
