= Şehzade Murad (son of Cem Sultan) =

Murad Pierre Mehmed of Sayd
- Şehzade of the Ottoman dynasty 1st Prince of Sayd
- Born: 1475; Konya, Ottoman Empire
- Died: December 1522 (aged 46–47); Rhodes, Ottoman Empire
- Spouse: Maria Concetta Doria
- Issue: Two sons Pietro Oshin Said, 2nd Prince of Sayd; Unnamed three daughters
- Dynasty: Ottoman
- Father: Cem Sultan
- Mother: Gülşirin Hatun
- Religion: Sunni Islam (previously); Roman Catholicism (later)

Şehzade Murad, later Pierre Mehmed, 1st Prince of Sayd (1475 - December 1522), was an Ottoman prince, son of Cem Sultan and Gülşirin Hatun.

== Life ==
Little is known about his early life. After their exile, Murad stayed in Cairo and later escaped to Rhodes, because he feared that the Mamluks would surrender him to Bayezid II, who executed his brothers Abdullah and Oğuzhan. Marino Sanuto says that on 5 December 1516, an ambassador of the Mamluk sultan came to Rhodes to demand the surrender of Murad, but the knights refused outright. Murad was given the Château de Fondo as his residence and showed gratitude by converting to Roman Catholicism, changing his name to Pierre. Pope Alexander VI created the Principate de Sayd in 1492 as a papal fief for him. Later, in 1498, he married an Italian woman named Maria Concetta Doria, born in 1484, daughter of Baldassare Doria and wife Bartolommea Doria, with issue. When Suleiman the Magnificent conquered Rhodes in 1522, he insisted that Murad to be handed over him, whereupon he had the prince executed by strangulation with his two oldest sons.

== Issue ==
By his wife, he had seven children, four sons and three daughters:

- Two sons. Strangled together with their father in December 1522, by order of their relative Suleiman the Magnificent;
- Pietro Oshin Said (Rome, 1500 – Naples, 1594), 2nd Prince of Sayd, married Teresa Grimaldi, daughter of Luca Grimaldi and Pellina Spinola, and had:
  - Gianbattista Said (Naples, 1554 – 1602), 3rd Prince of Sayd, 1st Prince of Bibino Magno. In 1599, he married Eleonora Abela, Baroness of Bibino Magno, daughter of Paolo Abela and Imperia Mannara, with issue.
  - Djem Said (Naples, 1561 – 1641), 4th Prince of Sayd, a monk in 1600. He married Matilda Ruffo (dead in 1599), natural daughter of Virgilio Ruffo of the Counts of Sinopoli, with issue.
- Three daughters, whose name are unknown.
