= Dilber =

Dilber may refer to:

- Dilber, a Persian given name, which is mostly used in Turkey as well
  - Dilber Yunus, also known mononymously as Dilber, Chinese Uyghur opera singer
  - Melisa Dilber Ertürk (born 1993), Turkish-Canadian woman footballer
- Dilber, a Turkic surname
  - Sıraç Dilber, Turkish scientist
  - Suzanna Dilber, Swedish actress
