= List of Turkish films of 2005 =

A list of films produced by the Turkish film industry in Turkey in 2005.

Director		Cast	Genre
2005
Anlat İstanbul	Selim Demirdelen, Kudret Sabancı	Altan Erkekli, Özgü Namal, Mehmet Günsür, Erkan Can, Azra Akın, Nejat İşler, Vahide Gördüm, Şevket Çoruh, Güven Kıraç, İsmail Hacıoğlu	Drama
Ayın Karanlık Yüzü	Biket İlhan		Romantic
Babam ve Oğlum	Çağan Irmak	Fikret Kuşkan, Çetin Tekindor, Ege Tanman, Hümeyra, Yetkin Dikinciler, Özge Özberk	Drama, comedy
Balans ve Manevra	Teoman	Teoman, Berna Öztürk	Drama
Banyo	Mustafa Altıoklar	Demet Evgar	Drama
Dabbe	Hasan Karacadağ	Ümit Acar, Kaan Girgin	Thriller
Eğreti Gelin	Atıf Yılmaz	Müjde Ar, Onur Ünsal, Nurgül Yeşilçay, Şevket Çoruh	Comedy, drama
Gönül Yarası	Yavuz Turgul	Şener Şen, Meltem Cumbul, Timuçin Esen	Drama
Hababam Sınıfı Askerde	Ferdi Eğilmez	Mehmet Ali Erbil, Hülya Avşar, Halit Akçatepe, Şafak Sezer, Mehmet Ali Alabora, Peker Açıkalın	Comedy
Hababam Sınıfı 3,5	Ferdi Eğilmez	Şafak Sezer, Cengiz Küçükayvaz, Halit Akçatepe, Mehmet Ali Erbil	Comedy
Hacivat Karagöz Neden Öldürüldü	Ezel Akay	Haluk Bilginer, Beyazıt Öztürk	Comedy, drama
Hırsız Var!	Oğuzhan Tercan	Haluk Bilginer, Mehmet Ali Erbil, Gamze Özçelik, Birol Ünel, Fatih Akın	Adventure, action, comedy
İki Genç Kız	Kutluğ Ataman	Hülya Avşar, Feride Çetin, Vildan Atasever	Comedy, drama
Kalbin Zamanı	Ali Özgentürk	Hülya Avşar, Halil Ergün, Oktay Kaynarca, Birol Ünel	Romantic
Kısık Ateşte 15 Dakika	Neco Çelik	Metin Akpınar, Haluk Bilginer, Özkan Uğur	Comedy
Maskeli Beşler İntikam Peşinde	Murat Aslan	Şafak Sezer, Memet Ali Alabora, Peker Açıkalın, Cengiz Küçükayvaz, Sümer Tilmaç	Comedy
Meleğin Düşüşü	Semih Kaplanoğlu	Tülin Özen, Budak Akalın, Musa Karagöz	Drama
Organize İşler	Yılmaz Erdoğan	Yılmaz Erdoğan, Tolga Çevik, Özgü Namal, Altan Erkekli, Demet Akbağ, Cem Yılmaz	Comedy, adventure
O Şimdi Mahkum	Abdullah Oğuz	Yavuz Bingöl, Burhan Öçal, Erkan Can, Zafer Algöz	Crime, comedy
Pardon	Mert Baykal	Ferhan Şensoy, Rasim Öztekin, Ali Çatalbaş	Comedy, drama
Sen Ne Dilersen	Cem Başeskioğlu	Işık Yenersu, Fikret Kuşkan, Işın Karaca, Zeynep Eronat, Yıldız Kenter, Ahmet Mümtaz Taylan	Drama
Takva	Özer Kızıltan	Erkan Can, Güven Kıraç	Drama
Şans Kapıyı Kırınca	Tayfun Güneyer	Ferhan Şensoy, Asuman Dabak, Rasim Öztekin, Zeki Alasya	Comedy
