= The Masked Gang: Iraq =

- Theatrical poster
- Directed by: Murat Aslan
- Written by: Murat Aslan
- Produced by: Murat Akdilek; Ferdi Eğilmez
- Starring: Şafak Sezer; Peker Açıkalın; Cengiz Küçükayvaz; Melih Ekener; Atilla Sarıhan; Erdal Tosun; Cezmi Baskın
- Cinematography: Ertunç Şenkay
- Edited by: Erkan Özekan
- Music by: Cem Erman
- Production companies: Arzu Film; Fida Film
- Distributed by: Özen Film; Maxximum Film
- Release date: January 12, 2007
- Running time: 108 mins
- Country: Turkey
- Language: Turkish
- Box office: US$7,717,183

The Masked Gang: Iraq (Turkish: Maskeli Beşler: Irak) is a 2007 Turkish comedy film, directed by Murat Aslan, about an incompetent gang of criminals attempting to capture an oil installation in northern Iraq in order divert the oil to Turkey. The film, which went on general release across Turkey on January 12, 2007, was the third highest-grossing Turkish film of 2007. It is a sequel to The Masked Gang (2005) and was followed by The Masked Gang: Cyprus (2008).

== Plot ==
In this sequel, the clumsiest comedy heroes of Turkish Cinema are convinced firmly that the rights of Turkey upon the oil supplies of the north Iraq are being ignored. Without further ado, they decide to end this unfairness. The idiotic group succeeds in bringing an Iraqi oil plant under American guard into its control. Guided by their leader Bahattin (Peker Acikalin), the gang members Bubbly Tezcan (Safak Sezer), Private Kamil (Cengiz Kucukayvaz), Clumsy Zeki (Melih Ekener) and Redneck Recep (Atilla Sarihan), manage to take the American soldiers as their hostages, and redirect the pipelines to Turkey. The good mannered gang, however, has difficulties in understanding, why this "clearly legal action" not only captures the attention of the local authorities, but also brings about a strong international crisis between Turkey and the USA. In addition, Tezcan falls in love with the American lieutenant Angel, making the situation as far more complicated.

== Cast ==
- Şafak Sezer as Tezcan
- Peker Açıkalın as Bahattin
- Cengiz Küçükayvaz as Kamil
- Melih Ekener as Zeki
- Atilla Sarıhan as Laz Recep
- Erdal Tosun as Peşto
- Cezmi Baskın as Reis
- Durul Bazan as Davi
- Ali Atıf Bir as the Turkish undersecretary
- Tatyana Tsvikeviç as the American soldier
- Charles Carroll as the American general
- Ceyhun Yılmaz as the taxi driver

== Release ==
The film opened on general release in 350 screens across Turkey on January 12, 2007 at number two in the Turkish box office chart with a worldwide opening weekend gross of $1,988,968.

Opening weekend gross
Date	Territory	Screens	Rank	Gross
January 12, 2007	Turkey	350	2	$1,264,426
January 24, 2007	Belgium	10	13	$82,035
January 25, 2007	Germany	53	14	$253,684
January 25, 2007	Austria	8	11	$51,708

== Reception ==
The movie remained number one at the Turkish box office for two weeks tunning and was the third highest grossing Turkish film of 2007 with a total gross of $6,563,123. It remained in the Turkish box-office charts for forty-nine weeks and made a total worldwide gross of $7,717,183.
