= List of 2005 box office number-one films in Turkey =

This is a list of films which have placed number one at the weekly box office in Turkey during 2005. The weeks start on Fridays, and finish on Thursdays. The box-office number one is established in terms of tickets sold during the week.

== Box office number-one films ==
Hababam Sınıfı Askerde became the highest grossing film of 2005, despite not reaching #1 during the year.

Date	Title	Studio	Gross	Ref
January 7, 2005	Lovelorn	Filma-Cass	$605,416	
January 14, 2005	Wacky Class in Army	Fida Film	$1,896,453	
January 21, 2005	Wacky Class in Army	Fida Film	$2,486,953	
January 28, 2005	Wacky Class in Army	Fida Film	$1,194,808	
February 4, 2005	Ocean's Twelve	Village Roadshow Pictures, Jerry Weintraub Productions, & Section Eight Productions	$927,007	
February 11, 2005	Meet the Fockers	Tribeca Productions & Everyman Pictures	$447,452	
February 18, 2005	Borrowed Bride	Yesilçam Filmcilik, Cinegram, & Eurimages	$645,720	
February 25, 2005	Borrowed Bride	Yesilçam Filmcilik, Cinegram, & Eurimages	$518,880	
March 4, 2005	Borrowed Bride	Yesilçam Filmcilik, Cinegram, & Eurimages	$363,571	
March 11, 2005	Constantine	Warner Bros. Pictures, Village Roadshow Pictures, Batfilm Productions, The Donners' Company, Weed Road Pictures, & 3 Arts Entertainment	$756,307	
March 18, 2005	Gallipoli	December Films & TRT	$771,999	
March 25, 2005	Gallipoli	December Films & TRT	$400,519	
April 1, 2005	Hide and Seek	Josephson Entertainment	$264,870	
April 8, 2005	Hide and Seek	Josephson Entertainment	$136,560	
April 15, 2005	In the Jail Now	Green Pine Studios	$235,222	
April 22, 2005	The Interpreter	Working Title Films, StudioCanal, & Mirage Enterprises	$393,313	
April 29, 2005	The Interpreter	Working Title Films, StudioCanal, & Mirage Enterprises	$225,870	
May 6, 2005	Kingdom of Heaven	Scott Free Productions, Inside Track, & Studio Babelsberg	$793,597	
May 13, 2005	Kingdom of Heaven	Scott Free Productions, Inside Track, & Studio Babelsberg	$533,800	
May 20, 2005	Star Wars: Episode III - Revenge of the Sith	Lucasfilm Ltd.	$535,106	
May 27, 2005	Empire of the Wolves	Gaumont & TF1 Films Production	$363,001	
June 3, 2005	Madagascar	DreamWorks Animation SKG & PDI/DreamWorks	$264,603	
June 10, 2005	Mr. & Mrs. Smith	Regency Enterprises, Epsilon Motion Pictures, New Regency, Summit Entertainment, & Weed Road Pictures	$561,126	
June 17, 2005	Batman Begins	Warner Bros. Pictures, DC Comics, Legendary Pictures, Syncopy, & Patalex III Productions	$308,768	
June 24, 2005	Mr. & Mrs. Smith	Regency Enterprises, Epsilon Motion Pictures, New Regency, Summit Entertainment, & Weed Road Pictures	$146,982	
July 1, 2005	War of the Worlds	Paramount Pictures, DreamWorks Pictures, Amblin Entertainment, & Cruise/Wagner Productions	$1,110,952	
July 8, 2005	War of the Worlds	Paramount Pictures, DreamWorks Pictures, Amblin Entertainment, & Cruise/Wagner Productions	$419,852	
July 15, 2005	War of the Worlds	Paramount Pictures, DreamWorks Pictures, Amblin Entertainment, & Cruise/Wagner Productions	$240,174	
July 22, 2005	Dark Water (2005 Reissue)	Touchstone Pictures	$143,188	
July 29, 2005	War of the Worlds	Paramount Pictures, DreamWorks Pictures, Amblin Entertainment, & Cruise/Wagner Productions	$88,431	
August 5, 2005	Land of the Dead	Atmosphere Entertainment MM, Romero-Grunwald Productions, Wild Bunch S.A., & Rangerkim	$120,215	
August 12, 2005	Charlie and the Chocolate Factory	Village Roadshow Pictures, The Zanuck Company, Plan B Entertainment	$194,246	
August 19, 2005	The Long Weekend	Gold Circle Films, Brightlight Pictures, & Pointblank Pictures	$120,118	
August 26, 2005	The Skeleton Key	Shadowcatcher Entertainment & Double Feature Films	$217,236	
September 2, 2005	The Island	DreamWorks Pictures & Parkes/MacDonald Productions	$392,202	
September 9, 2005	The Island	DreamWorks Pictures & Parkes/MacDonald Productions	$214,880	
September 16, 2005	Cinderella Man	Touchstone Pictures, Universal Pictures, Miramax Films, & Imagine Entertainment	$209,146	
September 23, 2005	Cinderella Man	Touchstone Pictures, Universal Pictures, Miramax Films, & Imagine Entertainment	$205,965	
September 30, 2005	Wedding Crashers	Tapestry Films	$175,553	
October 7, 2005	The Cave	Lakeshore Entertainment & Cinerenta	$188,586	
October 14, 2005	Lord of War	Entertainment Manufacturing Company, Saturn Films, Ascendant Pictures, & VIP 3 Medienfonds	$301,885	
October 21, 2005	Lord of War	Entertainment Manufacturing Company, Saturn Films, Ascendant Pictures, & VIP 3 Medienfonds	$206,850	
October 28, 2005	Döngel Kârhanesi	Medyavizyon	$634,391	
November 4, 2005	Maskeli 5'ler	Arzu Film & Fida Film	$1,242,519	
November 11, 2005	Flightplan	Touchstone Pictures & Imagine Entertainment	$606,245	
November 18, 2005	Harry Potter and the Goblet of Fire	Warner Bros. Pictures & Heyday Films	$1,408,991	
November 25, 2005	Harry Potter and the Goblet of Fire	Warner Bros. Pictures & Heyday Films	$748,339	
December 2, 2005	My Father and My Son	Avşar Film	$1,127,499	
December 9, 2005	My Father and My Son	Avşar Film	$1,436,235	
December 16, 2005	My Father and My Son	Avşar Film	$1,211,774	
December 23, 2005	Magic Carpet Ride	Beşiktaş Kültür Merkezi	$3,177,932	
December 30, 2006	Magic Carpet Ride	Beşiktaş Kültür Merkezi	$1,680,888	

== Highest-grossing films ==
=== In-Year Release ===
Highest-grossing films of 2005 by In-year release
Rank	Title	Distributor	Domestic gross
1.	Hababam Sınıfı Askerde	Özen	₺15.373.728
2.	My Father and My Son	Özen	₺12.329.875
3.	Magic Carpet Ride	KenDa	₺6.364.425
4.	Robbery Alla Turca	UIP	₺6.060.372
5.	Lovelorn	Warner Bros.	₺5.603.245
6.	Harry Potter and the Goblet of Fire	Warner Bros.	₺5.004.116
7.	The Masked Gang	Özen	₺4.892.254
8.	War of the Worlds	UIP	₺4.380.710
9.	Döngel Karhanesi	MVZ	₺4.247.945
10.	Kingdom of Heaven	Özen	₺4.153.509
