= Kahpe Bizans =

- Directed by: Gani Müjde
- Written by: Fatih Solmaz and Kemal Kenan Ergen
- Produced by: Cengiz Cagatay, Ferdi Eğilmez, Mehmet Soyarslan, Şenol Zencir
- Cinematography: Uğur İçbak
- Edited by: Onur Tan
- Music by: Uğur Dikmen
- Distributed by: Ozen Film
- Release date: January 21, 2000
- Country: Turkey
- Language: Turkish
- Budget: $1.5 million
- Box office: 2.5 million admissions (Turkey)

Kahpe Bizans (English: Perfidious Byzantine) is a 2000 Turkish comedy film directed by Gani Müjde. It is a parody of the 1970s kitsch Turkish historical drama movies. It was one of the highest-grossing films in Turkey, with admissions of over 2.5 million.

== Cast ==
- Mehmet Ali Erbil as İmparator İlletyus
- Demet Şener as Emmanuelle
- Cem Davran as Yetiş Bey, Markus Antonyus
- Sümer Tilmaç as Süper Gazi
- Ayşegül Aldinç as Teodora
- Nurseli İdiz as Helena
- Hande Ataizi as Mağdure Hanım
- Yılmaz Köksal as Sepetçioğlu
- Cengiz Küçükayvaz as Simitis
- Suat Sungur as Tavşan Bey
- Günay Karacaoğlu as Anaç Hatun
- Ümit Okur as Teodorakis
- Belma Canciğer as Arap Bacı
- Cem Karaca as Saz aşığı
- Metin Şentürk as Saray bekçisi
- Şencan Güleryüz as Lombelikus
- Cezmi Baskın as Hacı Makarios Çelebi
- Kerem Kupacı as Borazancı
