= Hemşo =

- Directed by: Ömer Uğur
- Written by: Ömer Uğur, Resul Ertaş
- Produced by: Cengiz Çağatay, Şenol Zencir
- Music by: Arto Tunçboyacıyan
- Release date: 31 August 2000
- Running time: 93 minutes
- Country: Turkey
- Language: Turkish

Hemşo is a 2000 Turkish film directed and written by Ömer Uğur.

== Cast ==
- Okan Bayülgen as Cebrail
- Mehmet Ali Erbil as Yaşar
- Demet Şener as Tatyana
- Sümer Tilmaç as Hamit
- Özlem Yıldız as Mariana
- Oya Aydoğan
- Yaşar Güner as The landlord
- Yıldız Kaplan
- Levent Kazak
- Yılmaz Köksal
- Cengiz Küçükayvaz
- Dilaver Uyanık as Cebrail's grandfather
