= Follow Kadri, Not Your Heart =

- Theatrical poster
- Directed by: Onur Tan
- Written by: Uğur Uludağ
- Produced by: Derya Karaköse; Cem Özer
- Starring: Şafak Sezer; Alp Kırşan; Esin Civangil; Eylem Şenkal; Ahmet Mümtaz Taylan
- Cinematography: Rico
- Edited by: Murat Bolayır
- Production company: Ustaoglu Film Production
- Distributed by: Medyavizyon
- Release date: January 16, 2009
- Running time: 95 minutes
- Country: Turkey
- Language: Turkish
- Box office: $2,502,800

Follow Kadri, Not Your Heart (Turkish: Kadri'nin Götürdüğü Yere Git) is a 2009 Turkish comedy film, directed by Onur Tan, starring Şafak Sezer as a man who goes on holiday to get over being dumped, only to find his ex at the same hotel. The film, which went on nationwide general release across Turkey on January 16, 2009, was one of the highest-grossing Turkish films of 2009.

== Plot ==
Kadri and Cem are very close friends (Kankas or "blood brothers"). After Cem is dumped by his girlfriend Betül, Kadri suggests that he go on a holiday to Antalya to get over it. Eventually Cem meets and falls in love with a girl named Umut. But then Betül and her new boyfriend Hakan show up at the same hotel.

== Cast ==
- Şafak Sezer as Kadri
- Alp Kırşan as Cem
- Esin Civangil as Umut
- Eylem Şenkal as Betül
- Ahmet Mümtaz Taylan as Güneş
- Nesrin Akdağ as Deniz
- Sevgi Berna Biber as Aysun
- Gülden Avşaroğlu as Şeri
- Nurseli Tırışkan as Menejer
- Nilgün Belgün as Teyze
- Cem Özer as Arçil Naz
- Uğur Uludağ as Şota
- Ebru Özenden as Beyza

== Release ==
The film opened in 164 screens across Turkey on January 16, 2009 at number 1 in the box office chart with an opening weekend gross of $433,672.

Opening weekend gross
Date	Territory	Screens	Rank	Gross
January 16, 2009	Turkey	164	1	$433,672
February 26, 2009	Germany	31	27	$60,604
February 27, 2009	Austria	3	26	$7,277
March 6, 2009	UK	2	53	$3,734

== Reception ==
=== Box office ===
The film was the seventh highest grossing Turkish film of 2009 with a total worldwide gross of $2,502,800.

== See also ==
- 2009 in film
- Turkish films of 2009
