= The Masked Gang: Cyprus =

- Theatrical poster
- Directed by: Murat Aslan
- Written by: Murat Aslan
- Produced by: Murat Akdilek
- Starring: Mehmet Ali Erbil; Şafak Sezer; Peker Açıkalın; Melih Ekener; Cengiz Küçükayvaz; Atilla Saruhan; Seray Sever; Deniz Akkaya; Hakan Ural
- Cinematography: Soykut Turan
- Music by: Cem Erman
- Production companies: Arzu Film; Fida Film
- Distributed by: United International Pictures; Maxximum Film
- Release date: January 11, 2008
- Running time: 98 mins
- Country: Turkey
- Language: Turkish
- Box office: US$7,006,849

The Masked Gang: Cyprus (Turkish: Maskeli Beşler: Kıbrıs) is a 2008 Turkish comedy film directed by Murat Aslan. The film, which is about an incompetent gang of criminals attempting to go straight, is a sequel to The Masked Gang (2005) and The Masked Gang: Iraq (2007). It went on general release across Turkey on January 11, 2008 and was the fifth-highest-grossing Turkish film of 2008.

== Synopsis ==
After an unsuccessful bank robbery, as well as the failure of a spontaneous ambush upon the oil plant in Iraq, the clumsy comedy heroes finally decide to retire from their small criminal lives. However, the dignified career as exterminator suffers many infamous perils, as they inhale more insecticide than the insects themselves. Thus the doctor prescribes a vacation at the seaside. But then there is Rocky Selim, a crook from the underworld, disguised as an honorable businessman, who is planning a casino robbery in North Cyprus. His plan is going well, yet he is desperately in need of a criminal gang to carry out his plan. Fortunately, the paths of the masked gang overlap with Rocky Selim, who hires them instantly. With no preparations at all, the masked gang follows the call of the justice and starts implementing the plans of Rocky Selim.

== Release ==
The film opened on general release in 350 screens across Turkey on January 11, 2008 at number two in the Turkish box office chart with a worldwide opening weekend gross of $1,264,426.

Opening weekend gross
Date	Territory	Screens	Rank	Gross
January 11, 2008	Turkey	350	2	$1,264,426
January 16, 2008	Belgium	5	11	$101,042
January 17, 2008	Germany	54	10	$407,625
January 18, 2008	Austria	6	8	$54,390
January 18, 2008	United Kingdom	1	33	$12,835

== Reception ==
The movie reached number one at the Turkish box office and was the sixth-highest-grossing Turkish film of 2008 with a total gross of $5,575,199. It remained in the Turkish box-office charts for twenty-six weeks and made a total worldwide gross of $7,006,849.
