= Ceyhun Yılmaz =

Turkish actor

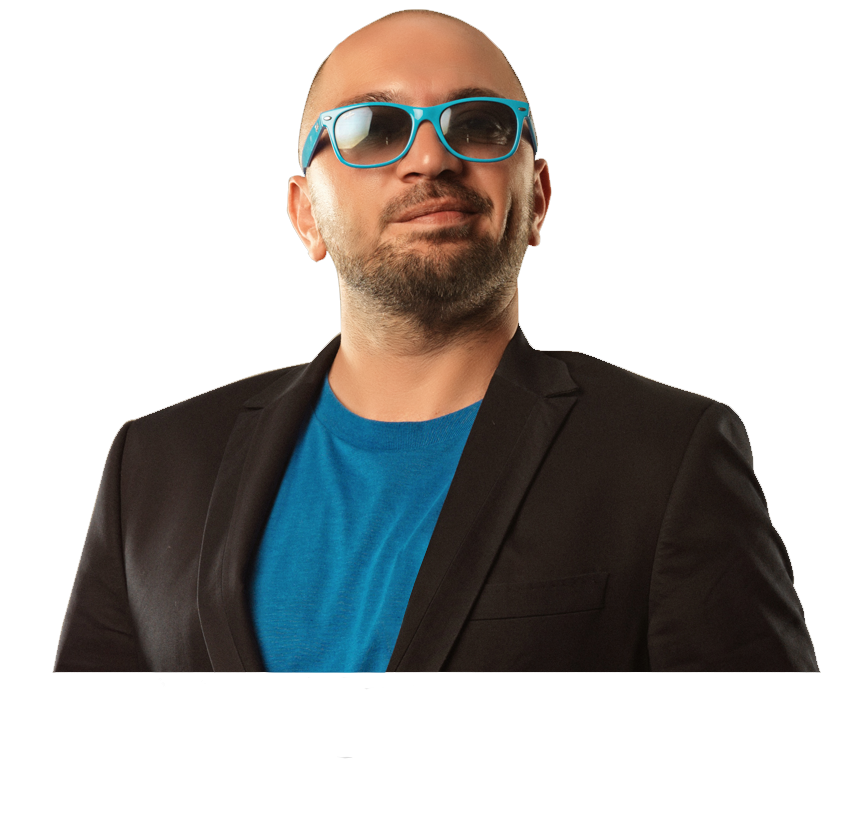
- Born: 5 October 1976 (age 49); Istanbul, Turkey
- Occupations: Comedian, actor, radioman, TV presenter, poet
- Years active: 1995–present
- Website: ceyhunyilmaz.com

Ceyhun Yılmaz (born 5 October 1976) is a Turkish comedian, actor, radio and TV presenter.

== Life and career ==
In 2002, Ceyhun Yılmaz published his first book of poetry. That same year, he left school and stepped away from his TV and radio roles to join the army. After spending 4 months in Van, Turkey, he toured all of the provinces, doing 107 stand-up shows for the troops and high ranking officials.

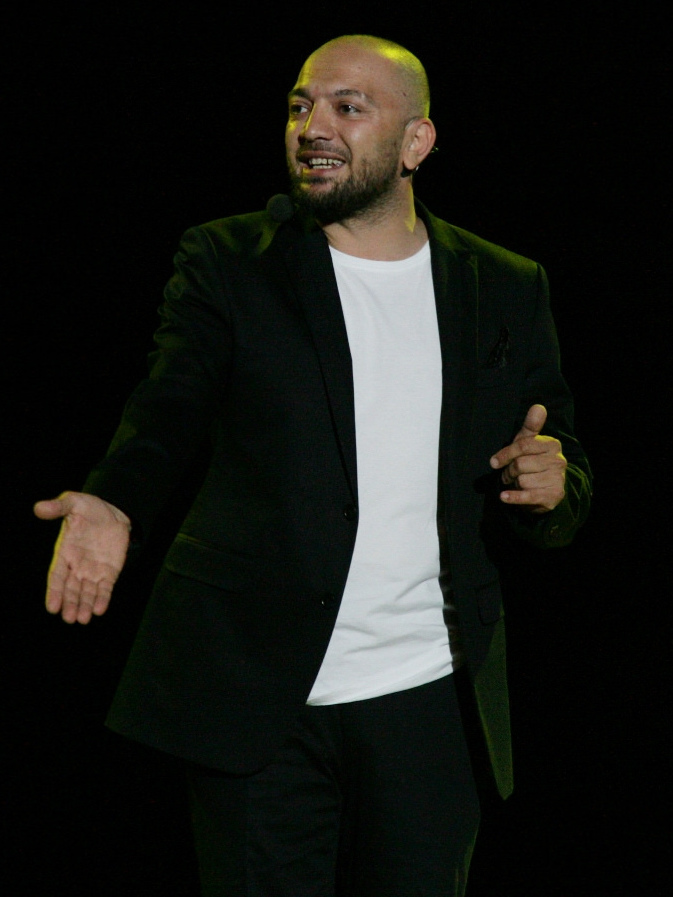
Ceyhun Yılmaz in 2012

He completed his military service in 2003 and returned to radio work and immediately published his second poetry book, Kasımın Bıçak Yarası. He began presenting shows in the same year. He signed a contract with TRT for a television program in 2004 and presented Şov Rüzgarı for 14 episodes. In 2005, he transferred to Cine5 and introduced the program Ceyhun Yılmaz Talk Show, which aired every night of the week. Throughout its 165 episodes, the program featured 210 famous guests.

In 2006, he published another poetry book entitled İkinci El Yalnızlık and donated the profits from the book sales to the Turkish Kidney Foundation and Turkish Education Volunteers Foundation.

Between February 2004 and May 2006, he had a recurring role in the TV series Hayat Bilgisi, spanning 92 episodes. On 13 May 2006, as a result of an accident while filming the series, he broke his foot and arm. On the same day, his mother died, prompting him to leave the workforce.

In June 2007, he made another agreement with TRT and presented the program Sayısal Gece throughout the summer. In the same year, he appeared in the series Küçük Hanımefendi, which also starred Tuba Ünsal. In 2008, he co-hosted Sayısal Gece on TRT with Sibel Can and continued the program in the winter season, presenting a total of 40 episodes. In 2009, he presented the program İstanbul Sokakları on TRT Müzik. In 2011, he prepared and presented the sports program Hoş Beş Iki for 13 episodes, together with Simge Fıstıkoğlu on Habertürk TV.

In 2011, he prepared and presented the 21 sports-talk show program on Lig TV. In 2011, he published the books Sensiz Harfler, a combination of his previous 3 books, and Sevdiğim İkinci Kadınsın Sen. The profits from the sales were donated to Children with Leukemia Health and Education Foundation.

He attended more than 100 university panels as a speaker between 1999-2012 and has received multiple awards throughout his career. He has made cameos in various films, including Hababam Sınıfı Merhaba, Hababam Sınıfı Askerde, Maskeli Beşler, Maskeli Beşler: Irak, Maskeli Beşler: Kıbrıs, Osmanlı Cumhuriyeti, and Çakallarla Dans, as well as the TV youth series Hayat Bilgisi, Melekler Korusun, surreal series Leyla ile Mecnun, Selena and Babam İçin.

In 2013, he presented the daily Ceyhun Yılmaz Show on Alem FM. In addition, he did an alternative broadcast online called PACYA, airing between commercials and at different times of the day.

Since February, 2020, he has been presenting a program on Kafa Radyo.

== Bibliography ==
=== Poetry books ===
Year	Title
2002	Ben Sana Yanarken Şimdi Sen Kim Bilir Nerede Üşüyorsun
2004	Kasım'ın Bıçak Yarası
2006	İkinci El Yalnızlık
2011	Sensiz Harfler
2011	Sevdiğim İkinci Kadınsın Sen
2014	Yalnızsam Düzelt

== Filmography ==
=== As presenter ===
Year	Network	Title	Notes
2001	ATV	Ceyhun Yılmaz Show	
2004	TRT 1	Şov Rüzgarı	
2005	Cine5	Ceyhun Yılmaz Show	
2007–2008	TRT 1	Sayısal Gece	
2009	TRT Müzik	İstanbul Sokakları	
2011	Habertürk TV	Hoş Beş İki	
2011	Lig TV	21	Devam ediyor
2014	TRT Haber	Ceyhun Yılmaz'la Bir Dünya Sohbet	
2015	Lig TV	5'te Devre 10'da Biter	

=== As actor ===
Year	Type	Title	Role	Notes
2003	TV series	Hayat Bilgisi	Ruhi	
2004	Film	Hababam Sınıfı Merhaba	Kermit Kemal	
2005	Film	Hababam Sınıfı Askerde	Kermit Kemal	
2005	Film	Maskeli Beşler İntikam Peşinde	Taxi driver	
2006	Film	Maskeli Beşler: Irak	Taxi driver	
2006	TV series	Selena	Cüneyt Alpago	
2007	Film	Maskeli Beşler: Kıbrıs	Taxi driver	
2007	TV filmi	Küçük Hanım Kar Tanesi	Engin Yurtoğlu	
2008	Film	Osmanlı Cumhuriyeti	Traffic police	
2010	Film	Çakallarla Dans	Adem	
2010	TV series	Melekler Korusun	Ali Osman (guest appearance)	
2012	TV series	Leyla ile Mecnun	Radioman (guest appearance)	Episode 48
2012	TV series	Babam İçin	Ali (guest appearance)	Episode 19
2012	Film	Çakallarla Dans 2: Hastasıyız Dede	Adem	
2014	TV series	Kardeş Payı	Scientist (guest appearance)	Episode 22
2014	Film	Çakallarla Dans 3: Sıfır Sıkıntı	Adem	
2016	Film	Adam Mısın!	Taylan (hotel manager)	
2016	Film	Çakallarla Dans 4	Adem	
2019	Film	Hayatta Olmaz		
2022	Film	Çakallarla Dans 6	Adem	
