= Evrim Akın =

Turkish actress

- Born: Evrim Sülün Akın; 12 June 1979 (age 46); Ankara, Turkey
- Occupations: Actress, TV presenter
- Years active: 1995–present
- Notable work: Avrupa Yakası; Bez Bebek
- Spouse: Ümit Çırak (m. 1997; div. 1998)

Evrim Sülün Akın (born 12 June 1979) is a Turkish cinema, television, and theatre actress and TV presenter.

== Early years ==
She is from Paternal side of Albanian origin and from Maternal side of Kurdish roots. Evrim Akın, who lost her father at the age of 17, started her acting career as a trainee at Konak Municipal Theater in İzmir. Then she got enrolled in Müjdat Gezen Art School. There she met Ümit Çırak, and at the age of 17 married him. The marriage was short-lived and they divorced.

== Career ==
Akın appeared on several sketches of İbo Show. She had her television debut as an actress with the role of Çiçek on İmparator, a TV series written and directed by İbrahim Tatlıses for Show TV.

After appearing in minor roles, Akın's main breakthrough came with the hit sitcom Avrupa Yakası, in which she portrayed Selin Yerebakan. She then had the leading role Nana, in popular fantasy child series Bez Bebek. Between 2011 and 2013, she was a cast member on atv's series Alemin Kıralı and portrayed Jülide.

In 2019, she joined the cast of Güldür Güldür Show and started portraying different characters. Akın has received many awards and nomination throughout her career.

=== As Tv Host ===
In 2007, she joined Müjdat Gezen, Levent Kırca and Peker Açıkalın as a judge on the TV program Güldür Bakalım. She later worked as a presenter on the program Koca Kafalar TV. Akın continued her career as a TV presenter with TV8's competition program Uzman Avı. She then presented the program Ev Kuşu on Show TV. She then served as a coach on Show TV's competition program Piramit. Between 2016 and 2019, she presented children's program Çocuktan Al Haberi on the same channel.

== Filmography ==
Cinema
Year	Title	Role	Notes
1999	Kimsecikler	Ayşegül	
2006	Şaşkın	Zeynep	
2015	Köstebekgiller: Perili Orman	Şehnaz Şıkır	
2020	Gamonya: Hayaller Ülkesi	Nana	
Television
Year	Title	Role	Notes
1998	İmparator	Çiçek	
2000–2001	Nisan Yağmuru	Kiraz	
2002–2003	Canım Kocacığım	Lara	
2003	Estağfurullah Yokuşu	Gümüş	
2004–2006	Avrupa Yakası	Selin Yerebakan	
2007–2010	Bez Bebek	Nana	Leading role
2011–2013	Alemin Kıralı	Jülide Mermercin	Leading role
Theatre
Year	Title	Role	Notes
1995	Yarın Başka Koruda	Ayşegül	Writer: Melih Cevdet Anday
1995	A Midsummer Night's Dream	Titania	Writer: William Shakespeare
1995	The Good Doctor	Linda	Writer: Neil Simon
1997	Tükürür Kaçarım	Betül	Writers: Uğur Uludağ and Gökhan Semiz
2000	Renkler Krallığı	Queen	Writer: Ender Yasever
2019–present	Güldür Güldür Show	Özge	episode 187–

=== Programs ===
- Akşam Yıldızı (2004) atv
- Güldür Bakalım (2007) Show TV
- Koca Kafalar TV (2008) Kanal D
- Fort Boyard (2008) FOX
- Uzman Avı (2009–2010) TV8
- Ev Kuşu (2014–2016) Show TV
- Piramit (2015–2016) Show TV
- Çocuktan Al Haberi (2016–2019) Show TV
