= Tamer Karadağlı =

Turkish actor

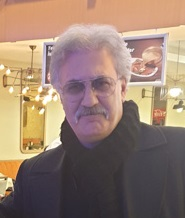
- Born: 24 May 1967 (age 58); Ankara, Turkey
- Education: Bilkent University
- Occupations: Actor; director
- Years active: Since 1992
- Spouse: Arzu Balkan (m. 2002; div. 2007)
- Children: 1
- Website: http://tamerkaradagli.com.tr

Tamer Karadağlı (born 24 May 1967) is a Turkish actor and director of Turkish State Theatres.

== Biography ==
Tamer Karadağlı's family originated in Sarıkamış, Kars Province, and moved to America a short time after he was born. They returned to Turkey just as he began primary school there. He studied at Çankaya High School and TED Ankara College, after which he graduated in theatre from Bilkent University Conservatory.

In 1993 he made his television debut in the hit daily series Ferhunde Hanımlar. Between 2002 and 2019, he became well known for starring in the hit sitcom Çocuklar Duymasın, which is one of the longest-running Turkish series. He played Yağmur Zamanı in the series.

Karadağlı also appeared as Timur in the series Şaşıfelek Çıkmazı and in the films Beyza'nın Kadınları and Living & Dying. In 2012, he starred with Seda Eğridere in the Turkish action film Alina, the Turkish Assassin. The consulting director and producer for the film was the American director Bobby Roth, whose directing credits include Lost, Prison Break, Revenge and Agents of S.H.I.E.L.D. Sex scenes in the film generated a lot of buzz around the film.

He married the actress Arzu Balkan in 2002 but they divorced in 2007. They have a daughter.

== Filmography ==
Movies
Year	Title	Role
2003	Bir Tutam Baharat	Mustafa
2005	Beyza'nın Kadınları	Fatih
2005	Şans Kapıyı Kırınca	Pilot
2007	Bayrampaşa: Ben Fazla Kalmayacağım	Polis
2007	Living & Dying	Duca
2009	Suluboya	
2010	Memlekette Demokrasi Var	Kaymakam
2012	Süper Türk	Ekber
2016	Pamuk Prens	Tamer
2017	Sinyalciler: Son Akşam Yemeği	
2018	Börü	Dubbing voice

Web series
Year	Title	Role
2022	Andropoz	
2023	Serhat	
TV series
Year	Title	Role
1993	Ferhunde Hanımlar	Selçuk
1999	Babam Olur Musun	Erol
1999	Demir Leblebi	
2000	Şaşı Felek Çıkmazı	Timur
2000	Sarı Evin Esrarı	
2000	Artık Sevmeyeceğim	Kemal
2001	Nasıl Evde Kaldım	Haldun
2002–2019	Çocuklar Duymasın	Haluk
2002	Reyting Hamdi	Okul Müdürü
2004–2006	Yağmur Zamanı	Fırat Çağlar
2006	Hayatım Sana Feda	Levent Başaran
2006	Arka Sokaklar	Sivil Polis
2007	Doktorlar	
2007	Fedai	Emin Bora
2008	Karamel	Çaycı
2008	Kiralık Oda	
2008	Son Ağa	Salim Ağa Bağcıoğlu
2008	Kırmızı Işık	Sunucu
2009	Avrupa Yakası	Sivil Polis
2009	Ah Kalbim	Kamuran
2009	Altın Kızlar	Konuk Oyuncu
2009	Sağlık Olsun	
2011	Adım Bayram Bayram	
2012	Acayip Hikayeler	Yakup
2019	Sevdim Seni Bir Kere	Assistant Commissioner
2021–	Savaşçı	Albay Oktay Göktürk
