= Alina, the Turkish Assassin =

- Directed by: Vladimir Jedlicka
- Written by: Seda Eğridere
- Produced by: Bobby Roth
- Starring: Tamer Karadağlı; Seda Eğridere
- Cinematography: Dustin Pearlman
- Release date: 2012
- Running time: 97 minutes
- Country: Turkey
- Languages: English; Turkish

Alina, the Turkish Assassin is a 2012 action film written by Seda Eğridere and directed by Vladimir Jedlicka. The consulting producer was American director Bobby Roth. It stars Seda Eğridere and Tamer Karadağlı.

== Plot ==
Alina tells story of Melisa Eryılmaz, a double agent named Alina, and her fight to discover the truth about her family and her real identity. Alina was adopted by Turkish secret service agent Fırat Yılmaz at the age of three and raised under the name Melisa Eryilmaz. Melisa learned Russian, Bulgarian, German, Arabic and English on her trips with Firat Yilmaz and eventually started to work with intelligence agencies such as MI-6, CSR, CESIS, BND, SGDN and SAVAK. What she would discover on one assignment would shatter everything she knew about her life and would set her on a dangerous mission to discover the truth behind her real identity.

== Cast ==
- Tamer Karadağlı
- Seda Eğridere

== Production ==
Production began in early 2010. After a long search, Seda Eğridere was cast as the title character. Consulting director/producer for the film was American director Bobby Roth. Upon being cast, Eğridere persuaded Roth to shoot parts of the film in her home country. In an interview with Turkish newspaper Hurriyet, Roth praised Eğridere's performance and discipline and noted that "I accepted the project and agreed to shoot in Turkey only because I trusted Seda." The casting process for the male lead actor was diligent and producers had difficulty finding a Turkish actor who spoke English well. Finally, in 2012, Tamer Karadağlı was cast from a large pool of acclaimed Turkish celebrities to star opposite Eğridere. Egridere was required to speak Russian, Spanish and Arabic, underwent extensive martial arts training and learned to ride a motorcycle. She was celebrated for her physical performance and the sex scenes with Tamer Karadağlı generated a lot of buzz.
