= Bosphorus Art Project =

Bosphorus Art Project is a non-profit organization established in Arizona, USA. It was founded in 2003 by a group of Turks and Turkish students living in Arizona, USA with the goal of introducing Turkish culture, history, arts and literature to Americans and help build connections between the two countries. After a year, they incorporated the organization in 2004. From their inception onwards, the organization received support from internationally recognized Turkish actress and director Seda Egridere who was among the founders of the organization and Turkish novelist Elif Şafak who has been an official contributor from the beginning.

== Foundation and history ==
Upon realizing the lack of information about their country and culture within the American public, in October 2003, a group of Turks and Turkish American students came together in Phoenix, Arizona and founded a non-profit organization which they chose to name Bosphorus Art Project, paying homage to their beloved city Istanbul, Turkey and hoping that the way Bosphorus Bridge connects east and west over Bosphorus, it would connect American and Turkish cultures together. At the time, a similar non-profit, the Moon and Stars Project in New York, USA, founded by Turks and Turkish Americans living in the east coast, was actively working towards introducing Turkish culture to Americans in the form of seminars, film days and art shows and the Turks and Turkish Americans of the west coast were inspired by their work. Bosphorus Art Project received substantial support from their east coast sister, The Moon and Stars Project, from their inception until 2006. One of the most prominent Turkish organizations in the States, Turkish Cultural Foundation also supported Bosphorus Art Project by approving grants for their cultural and promotional activities.

== Activities ==
The first cultural activity organized by Bosphorus Art Project was the Turkish Film Festival, which they organized in 2004 with the support and help of Phoenix Film Festival. It was the first Turkish Film Festival in the west coast and took place between September 10–12, 2004. During the festival, selective films from internationally recognized Turkish director Zeki Demirkubuz' filmography were screened with the attendance of a large audience. The first festival proved to be a success and the Bosphorus Art Project decided to turn it into an annual event. Next year, the 2nd Annual Turkish Film Festival was hosted with the official sponsor Harkins Valley Art Theatre in Phoenix Arizona between October 14–16, 2005. The following year, in 2006, Bosphorus Art Project rose to critical acclaim in the west coast and became an official partner of Phoenix Film Festival with the goal to screen Turkish films every year within Phoenix Film Festival. In 2006, the 3rd Annual Turkish Film Festival took place between September 29-October 1, 2006.

Bosphorus Art Project further received support from internationally recognized Turkish artists. Seda Egridere, a Turkish actress and filmmaker, was studying at Arizona State University at the time and became one of the founders, Elif Şafak, a modern Turkish novelist, joined a book signing in Phoenix, Arizona to support the organization, the author of the bestseller Expat Harem Catherine Salter attended a book talk, and many established local Turkish bands gave concerts to introduce Turkish music to masses.

With an attempt to bring together international artists, writers, filmmakers together, allow them to create art together and introduce them to American audiences, Bosphorus Art Project also publishes an online magazine of art and literature, Bosphorus Art Project Quarterly. The editors of Bosphorus Art Project Quarterly select a specific theme for each unique issue and accept worldwide submissions. The topics of the magazine cover a wide range from arts to literature and from theater to photography but always with the goal of building bridges among countries. Established authors including but not limited to Elif Shafak are among official contributors of the magazine and they submit excerpts from their literary works.
