= Shattered Soul =

- Directed by: Mustafa Altıoklar
- Starring: Demet Evgar; Tamer Karadağlı; Levent Üzümcü
- Release date: March 17, 2006 (Turkey)
- Country: Turkey
- Language: Turkish

Shattered Soul (Turkish title: Beyza'nın Kadınları which means "Beyza's Women") is a 2006 Turkish crime-thriller film starring Demet Evgar, Tamer Karadağlı and Levent Üzümcü, and directed by Mustafa Altıoklar.

== Plot ==
Seemingly content with the way her life goes, and deeply in love with her psychiatrist husband Doruk, Beyza is thrown off-balance by strange, occasional memory blackouts. Meanwhile, a number of mutilated legs found around Istanbul push the city into the terror of a serial murderer. Police Lieutenant Fatih investigates the gruesome murders with his new expert partner, Doruk. As the police follow the trail of the murderer, Beyza faces the truth about herself: a relationship, which even she cannot explain, exists between herself and the victims.

== Cast ==
- Demet Evgar as Beyza Türker
- Tamer Karadağlı as Fatih
- Levent Üzümcü as Doruk Türker
- Arda Kural as Naim
- Engin Hepileri as Hüseyin
- Mine Cayiroglu as Serap
- Berrak Tüzünataç as Figen
- Elif Dağdeviren as Doctor
- Damla Basak as Elif
- Engin Altan as Koray
