= Gazanfer Özcan =

Turkish actor (1931–2009)

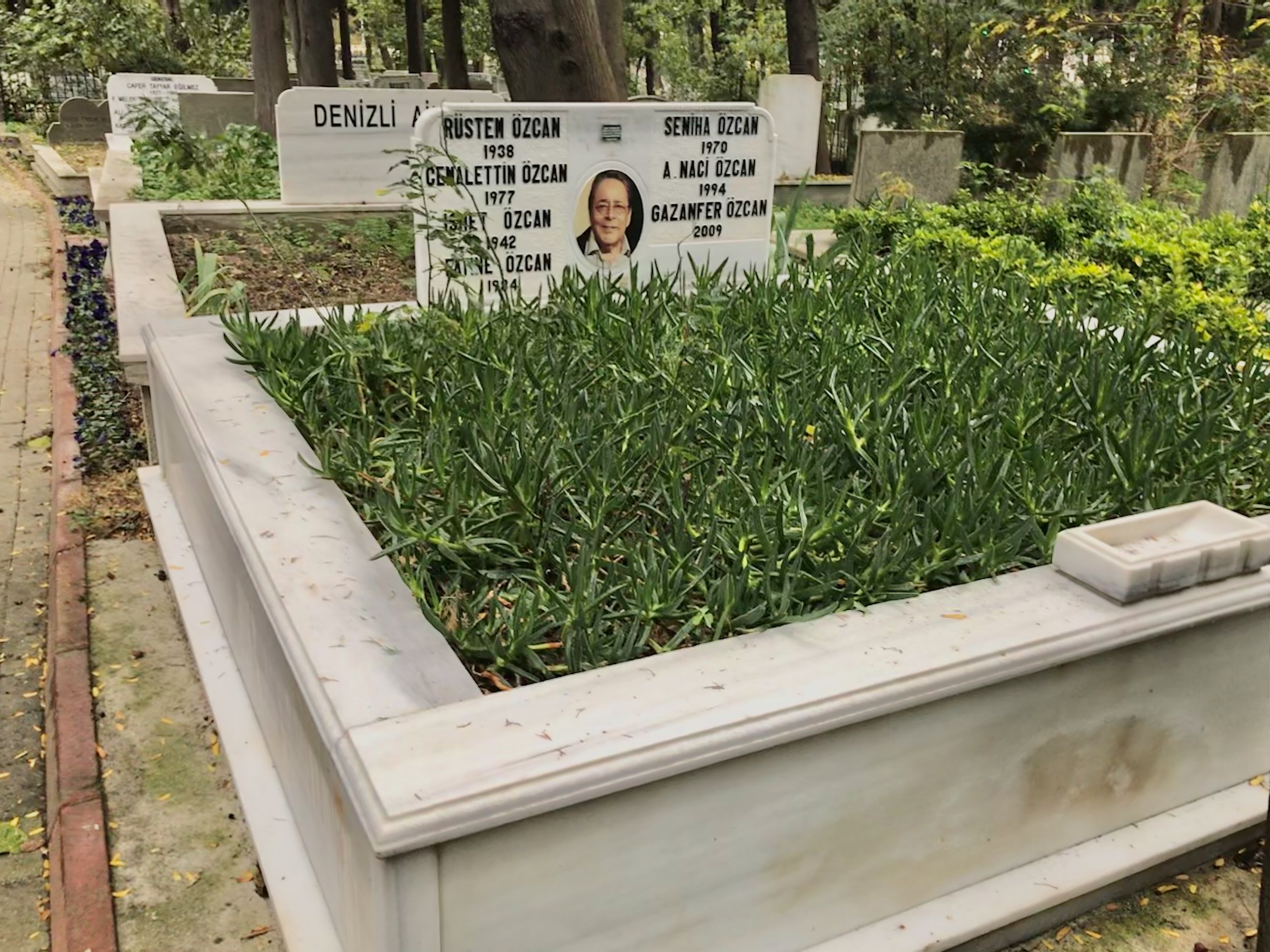
- Grave of Gazanfer Özcan
- Born: Saim Gazanfer Özcan; 27 January 1931; Istanbul, Turkey
- Died: 17 February 2009 (aged 78); Istanbul, Turkey
- Years active: 1952–2009
- Spouse: Gönül Ülkü (m. 1962) (second marriage)
- Children: 1
- Awards: Beyaz İnci Award for Best Supporting Actor (2005); 7th Annual Bonus International Comedy Films Festival – Honoree Award (2008)

Gazanfer Özcan (27 January 1931 – 17 February 2009) was a Turkish actor.

== Biography ==
Born on 27 January 1931 in Istanbul, He was a graduate of Vefa High School, Istanbul.

Özcan started his career as an actor with the play Hisse-i Şaiya at Vefa High School. Honored as a State Artist by the Ministry of Culture in 1998, he attracted millions of viewers with his performance as Tahsin Sütçüoğlu character in the famous TV series Avrupa Yakası. He died on 17 February 2009 in Istanbul due to cardiac failure and cerebrovascular problems he was having following a 20-day stay at the Istanbul American Hospital.

== Filmography ==
Film

- İngiliz Kemal Lawrence'a Karşı (1952)
- Çeto Salak Milyoner (1953)
- Fındıkçı Gelin (1954)
- Aramızda Yaşayamazsın (1954)
- Şimal Yıldızı (1954)
- Allı Yemeni (1958)
- Sevdalı Gelin (1959)
- Garipler Sokağı (1959)
- Biz İnsan Değil Miyiz? (1961)
- İki Damla Gözyaşı (1961)
- Utanmaz Adam (1961)
- Naciyem (1961)
- Minnoş (1961)
- Yedi Günlük Aşk (1961)
- Külkedisi (1961)
- Damat Beyefendi (1962)
- Şaka Yapma (1962)
- Avare Şoför (1963)
- Vur Patlasın Çal Oynasın (1970)
- Çılgın Yenge (1971)
- Televizyon Çocuğu (1975)
- Tokmak Nuri (1975)
- Ah Nerede Vah Nerede (1975)
- Dam Üstüne Çul Serelim (1975)
- Burnumu Keser Misiniz? (1992)
- Komser Şekspir (2000)
- Keloğlan Karaprens'e Karşı (2005)
- Beyaz Melek (2007)

Television

- Bu Nasıl İş (1985)
- Kuruntu Ailesi (1986)
- Başımıza Gelenler (2002)
- Baba (2003)
- Avrupa Yakası (2004–2009)
