= Yılmaz Köksal =

Turkish actor

- Born: 15 July 1951; Malatya, Turkey
- Died: 22 October 2015 (aged 64); Istanbul, Turkey
- Occupation: Actor
- Years active: 1965–2010

Yılmaz Köksal (15 July 1951 – 22 October 2015) was a Turkish actor. He appeared in more than one hundred films from 1965 to 2011.

== Selected filmography ==
Year	Title	Role	Notes
1972	Acı Zafer		
1999	Kahpe Bizans		
2000	Hemşo		
2010	Yahşi Batı		
