= Hülya Şen =

Turkish actress

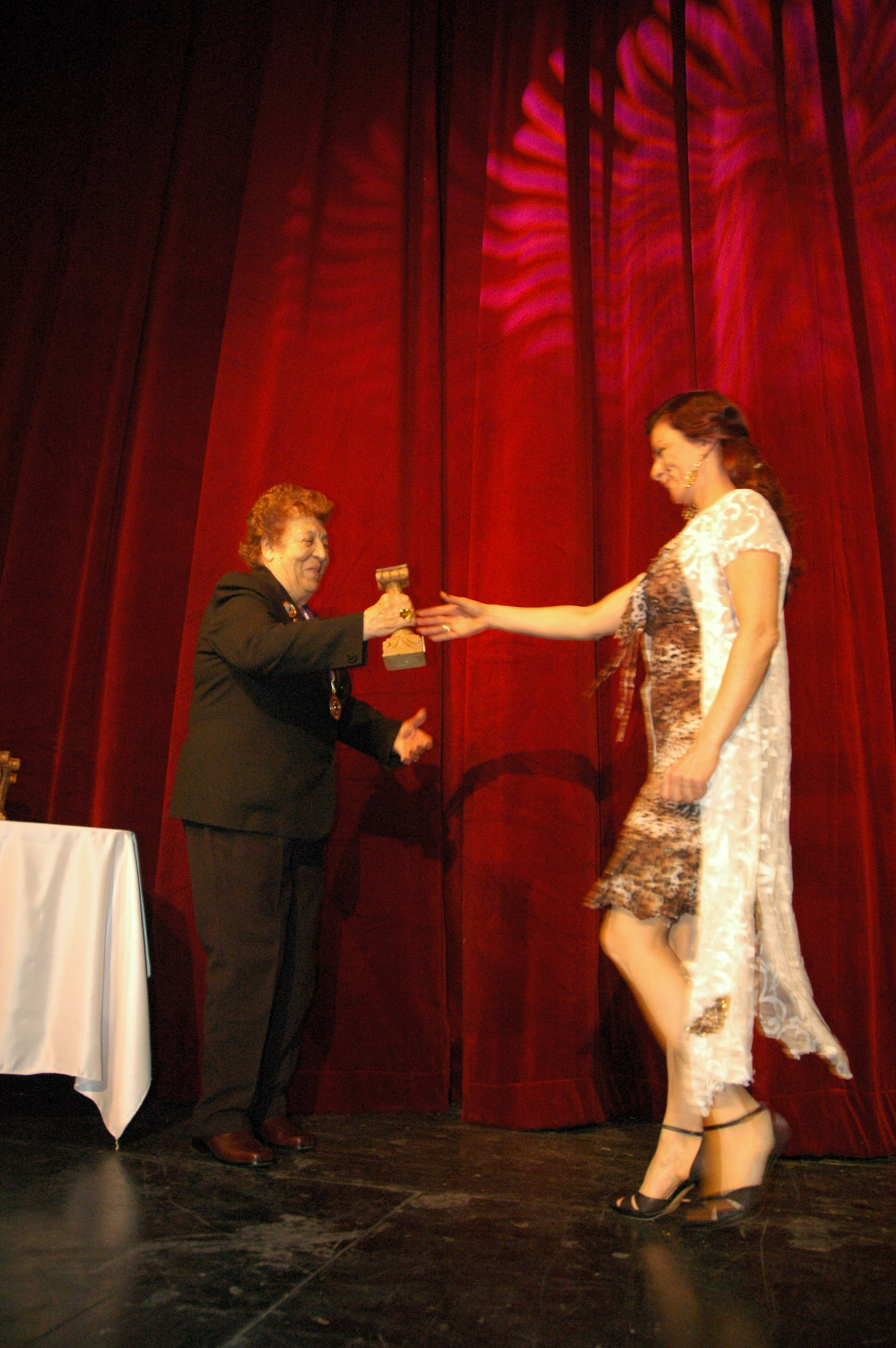
- Şen receiving an award for her role in Paramparça, 2007
- Born: 29 February 1968 (age 57); Balıkesir, Turkey
- Occupation: Actress
- Spouse: Cengiz Küçükayvaz (div.)
- Children: 1

Hülya Şen (born 29 February 1968) is a Turkish actress. She is a graduate of Dokuz Eylül University with a degree in theatre studies. While finishing her second year at the university, she appeared in a movie by Tekin Akmansoy. She made her television debut in 1994, after which she starred in various films and series. She has received multiple national awards.

== Filmography ==
=== Film ===
Year	Title	Character	Notes
1971	Vefasız		
2006	Aşk Beklemez		
2009	Sakın Ölme		
2010	Su Deposunda Ölüm		
2011	Komik Bir Aşk Hikayesi	Bayan Popo	
2017	Atçalı Kel Mehmet	Ayşe	
2018	Facia Üçlü		
2019	Döndüm Ben	Hikmet	
2023	Benim Babam Bir Kahraman		

=== TV series ===
Year	Title	Character	Notes
1994	Kaygısızlar		
1995	Aşk Artık Burada Oturmuyor	İnci	
1995	Boşlukta Bir Yer		
1997	Böyle mi Olacaktı	Aysel	
1999	Sır Dosyası		
2002	Reyting Hamdi	Hülya	
2002-2004	Zerda	Hacer Eroğlu	
2004	Büyük Buluşma I. Sezon	Belkız	
2005	Kayıtdışı	Gülnihal	
2005	Sevda Tepesi	Neriman	
2005	Kırık Kalpler Durağı		
2005	Naciye'yi Kim Sevmez	Mahkûm	
2006	Aşk Beklemez	Nevin	
2006	Kaybolan Yıllar	Suna	
2007	Kelebek Çıkmazı	Resmiye	
2008–2011	Küçük Kadınlar	Hala - Şevkiye	
2011	Anneler ile Kızları	Feride	
2012	Krem	Fikret	
2013	Tatar Ramazan	Emine	
2014	Yedi Güzel Adam	Şerife	Erdem's mother
2015	Serçe Sarayı	Mukaddes	
2015	Hatırla Gönül	Mehtap	
2016	O Hayat Benim		
2018	Avlu	Naciye	
2019	Aşk Ağlatır	Nihal	
2020	Şeref Sözü		
2022	Kırmızı Oda	Cevher	
2022–2023	Çöp Adam	Nesrin	
2023-2025	Hudutsuz Sevda	Zuhal	

=== Theatre ===
Year	Title	Character	Notes
2006	Paramparça		
2011	Her Yöne 90 Dakika		
2013	Terzinin Türküsü		
2013	Ah Evlendim, Vah Evlenemedim		
