= Acı Zafer =

1972 Turkish film

- Directed by: Halit Refiğ
- Starring: Yilmaz Köksal, Deniz Erkanat, Turgut Özatay
- Release date: 1972
- Country: Turkey
- Language: Turkish

Acı Zafer is a 1972 Turkish film directed by Halit Refiğ and starring Yilmaz Köksal, Deniz Erkanat, Turgut Özatay.
