= Levent Üzümcü =

Turkish actor (born 1972)

- Born: 6 July 1972 (age 54); İzmir, Turkey
- Occupation: Actor
- Spouse: Ebru Tuay (m. 1997; div. 2016)
- Children: 2

Levent Üzümcü (born 6 July 1972) is a Turkish actor, dissident and local politician in Şişli, Istanbul.

== Biography ==
Levent Üzümcü studied at Karşıyaka Aydoğdu Primary School and Eşref Paşa High School in İzmir. He trained in theatre first at the Anadolu University in Eskişehir and then at the Los Angeles Acting School. From 1996, he worked at the İstanbul City Theatre. He gained national fame playing Cem Onaran in the sitcom Avrupa Yakası. Additionally, he presented the Akıl Şampiyonu show on TürkMax.

In 2015, Üzümcü was dismissed from the Istanbul City Theater over statements critical of the ruling Justice and Development Party (AKP).

In 2019, he was elected as a member of the Şişli Municipal Council for the CHP (Republican People's Party) in the 2019 local elections, and served as Chairman of the Şişli Municipality Culture and Arts Commission from 2019 to 2023.

In 2024, he was appointed as the Artistic Director of the İzmir Metropolitan Municipality City Theatres and he will hold this position for a period of three years.

Üzümcü was married to psychological advisor Ebru Tuay from 1997 to 2016, and they have two children, Ada and Batu.

He was detained several times for criticizing the government and was placed under house arrest on 16 July 2026 after being charged with allegedly inciting public hatred and enmity in connection with a social media post. The charge concerned a tweet in which he wrote: "This country is being very poorly governed by a highly incompetent group; either we will get rid of these incompetents, or our descendants will curse our legacy."

== Filmography ==
Film
Year	Title	Role
2005	Beyza'nın Kadınları	Doruk Türker
2008	Umut	Fatih
2009	Abimm	Arif
2019	Merhaba Güzel Vatanım	Mayakovski
2021	Kimya	
Television
Year	Title	Role
1997	Bir Umut	
1998	Küçük İbo	Raşit
2000	Evdeki Yabancı	Ali Ertan
2002	Biz Size Aşık Olduk	Atilla
2002	Bayanlar Baylar	Cemil
2003	Serseri Aşıklar	Kenan
2004–2009	Avrupa Yakası	Cem Onaran
2006	Kabuslar Evi	
2010	Şen Yuva	Münir
2011	Anneler ile Kızları	Kerem
2012	Acayip Hikayeler	
2012–2013	Harem	Küçük Esat

== Awards ==
- 20th Sadri Alışık Theatre and Cinema Actor Awards – Best Male Theatre Actor of the Year (Comedy, Musical Play, or Musical), for İstibdat Kumpanyası and A Midsummer Night's Dream (Bir Yaz Gecesi Rüyası)
- 51st Salihli Poetry Afternoons ("Salihli Şiir İkindileri") – Dionysos Award for Contribution to the Arts
