= Demet Şener =

Turkish actress and model

- Born: 11 April 1977 (age 48); Istanbul, Turkey
- Occupations: Actress, model
- Spouse(s): İbrahim Kutluay (m. 2005; div. 2018) Cenk Küpeli (m. 2019; div. 2021)
- Children: 2

Demet Şener (born 11 April 1977) is a Turkish actress and former model who was crowned Miss Turkey 1995 and then represented her country at Miss World 1995.

== Biography ==
Demet Şener was born the youngest of three children, in İstanbul. She studied at Nişantaşı Kız Lisesi and began modeling in 1994. In 1995, she won the Miss Turkey pageant and competed in the Miss World pageant.

She presented the shows Vip Suare and Şans Direksiyonu, and acted in the series Bir Demet Tiyatro and Böyle mi Olacaktı. In 1999, she acted in the comedy film Kahpe Bizans directed by Gani Müjde and in the same year, she acted in the film Asansör directed by Mustafa Altıoklar. In 2000, she acted in the film Hemşo.

She was married to national basketball player İbrahim Kutluay and they have two children.

== Filmography ==
Cinema and Television
Year	Title	Role	Notes
1997	Bir Demet Tiyatro	Fahrigül	TV series/Supporting role
1997	Böyle mi Olacaktı	Hilal	TV series/Supporting role
1999	Asansör	Hemşire Nurcan	Movie/Supporting role
1999	Kahpe Bizans	Emanuel	Movie/Leading role
2000	Aşk Hırsızı	Demet	TV series/Leading role
2000	Hemşo	Tatyana	Movie/Leading role
2000	Gölge	Gölge	TV series/Leading role
2002	Reyting Hamdi		TV series/Supporting role

Preceded by Pınar Altuğ	Miss Turkey; 1995	Succeeded by Pınar Tezcan
