= Deniz Akkaya =

Turkish model

- Education: Istanbul University
- Occupations: Actress; businesswoman; editor; entrepreneur; model; presenter
- Years active: 1996–present
- Known for: Best Model of Turkey 1997
- Children: 1
- Modelling information
- Height: 1.79 m (5 ft 10 in)
- Hair colour: Auburn-dark brown (coloured; naturally light brown)
- Eye colour: Greyish-blue
- Beauty pageant titleholder
- Title: "Best Model of Turkey 1997"
- Major competitions: Best Model of Turkey (winner); Elite Model Look
- Website: denizakkaya.com.tr

Deniz Akkaya is a Turkish top model, presenter, occasional fashion editor and disc jockey, entrepreneur, businesswoman, and actress who won Best Model of Turkey 1997. As the top-earning model in Turkey in the early 2000s, Deniz Akkaya is considered to be one of the leading models in Turkish fashion history, and one of the most beautiful women of the country.

== Early life and family ==
Akkaya is Circassian, the daughter of a Hatuqwai father and a Kabardian mother named Dinemyis (Adyghe: Apple of the eye).

Her father was a bureaucrat and master mariner who served as the CEO (managing director) of Turkish Maritime Facilities Inc. Her mother was an economist who worked for Turkish Airlines, the national flag carrier of Turkey. She studied American philology.

After graduating from the ISTEK SS Private High School on the Avenue in Kadıköy, she studied American Culture and Literature in Department of Western Languages and Literatures of Faculty of Letters at Istanbul University. Following the competitions Elite Model Look and Best Model of Turkey, she decided to embark on a professional modelling career.

== Modelling career and fashion ==
In 2006, Akkaya became the host and lead judge of the fashion-themed reality television show Turkey's Next Top Model, the Turkish counterpart of the Top Model franchise that was hosted by many supermodels, including Tyra Banks in the United States and Heidi Klum in Germany.

In 2015, she was also entered in the Best of the Best as one of the Habertürk's top 20 winners of the Best Model of Turkey competition, and finished first amongst the former female titleholders who found entry in the large-scale survey that lasted for fifteen days.

== Acting career ==
After being crowned Best Model of Turkey 1997, Akkaya decided to embark on a professional modelling career. As a film and television actress, she has acted in the films The Masked Gang: Cyprus (2007), Living & Dying (2007), School (2003), Vizontele Tuuba (2003), and Green Light (2002) in addition to the television series Hemşehrim (1996), Şarkılar Seni Söyler (2003), and Metro Palas (2004). She also served as editor for a fashion magazine and launched the children's luxury ready-to-wear store Chic Frog by Deniz Akkaya.

== Personal life ==
In 2009, she gave birth to her daughter in Miami, Florida, US.

== Filmography ==
=== Film ===
Year	Film	Role	Notes
2002	Green Light		
2003	Vizontele Tuuba	Deniz Kızı (Mermaid)	
2003	School	Philosophy teacher Alev	Lead
2007	Living & Dying	Anne Noble	
2007	The Masked Gang: Cyprus	Bilge	Lead
2021	The Chaos Class Summer Games		

=== Television ===
Year	Title	Role	Notes
1996	Hemşehrim		
2003	Şarkılar Seni Söyler	Ayten Boralı	Lead
2004	Metro Palas	Yelda	Lead
2006	Turkey's Next Top Model	Herself	Host and lead judge
2015–2016	Deniz Akkaya ile Yeniden Ben	Herself	Host
2015–2016	Aramızda Kalmasın	Herself	Co-host
2016	O Bana Çok Benzer	Herself	Episode 1
2016–2017	Duymayan Kalmasın	Herself	Co-host

Awards and achievements
Preceded by Güzide Duran	Best Model of Turkey (female); 1997	Succeeded by Burcu Kutluk
