= Green Light (2002 film) =

Green Light (Yeşil Işık)
- Directed by: Faruk Aksoy
- Written by: Faruk Aksoy; Necef Uğurlu
- Starring: Hülya Avşar; Kenan Işık; Haldun Dormen; Çolpan İlhan; İlker İnanoğlu
- Cinematography: Ertunç Şenkay
- Release date: 5 April 2002
- Running time: 102 minutes
- Country: Turkey
- Language: Turkish

Green Light (Original Turkish title: Yeşil Işık) is a 2002 Turkish romantic drama film, written and directed by Faruk Aksoy.

== Plot ==
Elif is a married woman who has just caught her husband cheating. Ali is an investor on the verge of making a huge deal which could be very profitable, though at a high risk. The two cross paths at a bookstore and when they purchase the book "Yeşil Işık" ("Green Light"), and have a magical experience at the intervention of a figure observing them. When he loses all his money on the stock market after the September 11th terrorist attacks, Ali gets a heart attack . At the same time, Elif is discovered unconscious by her friend. They are both rushed to the same hospital, but Ali dies.

Ali reaches heaven, but he is refused entry into heaven and cannot return to Earth for a new life because his body has been buried and his (living) liver has been transplanted to another body. The figure who had been observing him all along, Yakup, turns out to be Ali's guardian angel and informs Ali that the person carrying his liver is Elif and the only solution would be to kill her.

Elif who is mourning after her mother death tries to commit suicide, but Ali remembering Elif from an encounter in a restaurant, saves her. After they spend the day together, Yakup warns Ali that he is endangering his own chances. Ali promises that he will kill her after a dinner date, but he unable to bring himself to do it. Instead they fall in love and drive to a hill to see if they can see the green light described in legend. When Ali is given the choice by Yakup to save himself or Elif, he sacrifices himself. But since their love was true, Ali is brought back to life. However Elif has no recollection of Ali or what took place.

== Cast ==
- Hülya Avşar – Elif
- Kenan Işık – Ali
- Haldun Dormen – Yakup
- Çolpan İlhan – Lamia
- İlker İnanoğlu – Mehmet
- Sema Atalay – Yeşim
- Uğur Kıvılcım – Gönül
- Cengiz Küçükayvaz
- İpek Tenolcay
- Deniz Akkaya
- Arda Kural
- Yasemin Kozanoğlu
- Doğa Bekleriz
- Eşref Kolçak
- Ayumi Takano

== Awards ==
Sema Atalay won the Golden Orange for Best Supporting Actress in 2002 for her role in the film.
