= Metin Şentürk =

Turkish pop singer (born 1966)

- Born: May 16, 1966 (age 60); Topkapı, Fatih, Istanbul, Turkey
- Genres: Pop; folk-pop; classical Turkish
- Occupations: musician; composer; record producer; TV presenter; actor
- Instrument: oud
- Years active: 1987–present
- Labels: Yaşar Kekeva Plak; Raks Müzik; Prestij Müzik; Mod Müzik; Avrupa Müzik; Seyhan Müzik; DMC

Metin Şentürk (born May 16, 1966) is a Turkish artist.

== Family life ==
Şentürk was born in Topkapı into a family with origins from Kosovo. He lost his eyesight in an accident at the age of three. For primary education, he attended a school for the blind for over eight years. His further education in high school and university took place however at traditional institutions. Metin Şentürk studied music and graduated from the State Conservatory at Istanbul Technical University. Şentürk is also the host of a television program on music and disability. He also founded the Istanbul-based World Disability Foundation and World Disability Union which has 200 members from six continents and 75 countries. In May 2006, he married Fulya Kalkavan, a member of a wealthy shipowner family. His wife filed for divorce in 2012 after she was diagnosed for thyroid cancer. Şentürk became the world's fastest unaccompanied blind driver on April 2, 2010. He drove a Ferrari F430 at Şanlıurfa GAP Airport, and was assisted by rally driver Volkan Işık on radio. His officially recorded top speed was 303.62 km/h (188.66 mph) and average speed 292.89 km/h (181.99 mph). The former record was set by British visually impaired Mike Newman at 284 km/h (176 mph).

== Filmography ==
- Kahpe Bizans (2000)
- Recep İvedik 3 (2010)

== Discography ==
- Elimdeki Fotoğrafın, (1987 – Yaşar Kekeva Plak)
- Bırakma Beni, (1991 – Yaşar Kekeva Plak)
- Allah Biliyor, (1992 – Raks Müzik)
- Yaktın Beni, (1993 – Raks Müzik)
- Sana Aitim, (1995 – Raks Müzik)
- Son Nokta, (1996 – Raks Müzik)
- Dünya Güzeli, (1997 – Raks Müzik)
- Sahte Dünya, (1999 – Prestij Müzik)
- Hazinem, (2000 – Prestij Müzik)
- Yolun Yarısı,(2001 – Şentürk Müzik)
- Dönmem Gerek,(2002 – Şentürk Müzik- Mod Müzik)
- Kalpten Kalbe,(2003 – Avrupa Müzik)
- Masal,(2006 – Seyhan Müzik)
- Zamanda Yolculuk,(2008 – Seyhan Müzik)
- Metin Şentürk ile Türk Sanat Müziği, (2009 – Seyhan Müzik)
- Bana Sen Lazımsın, (2012 – Seyhan Müzik)
- Kelebek, (2015 – DMC)
