= Cengiz Küçükayvaz =

Turkish actor (born 1968)

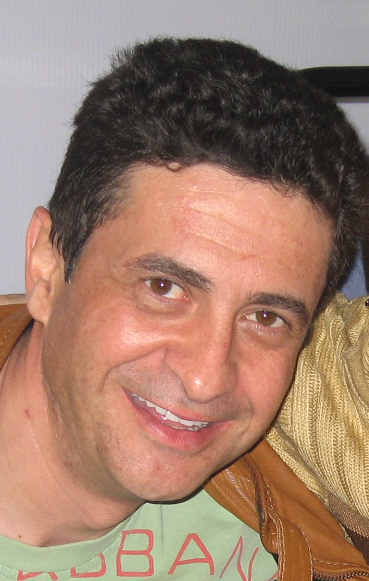
- Born: 30 July 1968 (age 58); Uşak, Turkey
- Occupations: Actor, comedian
- Years active: 1989–present
- Spouse(s): Hülya Şen (div.); Züleyha Karyağdı
- Children: 1

Cengiz Küçükayvaz (born 30 July 1968) is a Turkish actor who usually appears in comedic roles.

== Biography ==
Cengiz Küçükayvaz graduated in Theatre from Dokuz Eylül University's Faculty of Fine Arts. He began his professional acting career at the Tuncay Özinel Theatre and the Hadi Çaman Theatre. Küçükayvaz has appeared in several films and TV series including Reyting Hamdi, Çiçek Taksi, Lalelide bir Azize, Kahpe Bizans, the rebooted Hababam Sınıfı series, Maskeli Beşler series, Süper Ajan K-9 and Yedi Kocalı Hürmüz.

In 2008, he founded the Cengiz Küçükayvaz Theatre, named after himself. In the nineties, he also took part in the clip of Kibariye's song, "Alıştık artık". (literal translation is "We get used to it")

== Partial filmography ==
- Hoş Memo (1993)
- Çifte Vakkas (1993)
- Sonradan Görmeler (1994)
- Çiçek Taksi (1995, TV Series) - Ömer Sen
- Çılgın Bediş (1996, TV Series)
- Yasemince (1997, TV Series)
- Gemide (1998) - Henchman III
- Kaygısızlar (1998, TV Series) - Tayfun
- Laleli'de Bir Aziz (1998) - Doktor
- Naylon Kemal (1998)
- Mualla (1998)
- Kahpe Bizans (1999) - Simitis
- Kadınlar Kulübü (1999, TV Series)
- Parça Pinçik (2000, TV Mini-Series)
- Hemşo (2001)
- Yeşil Işık (2002)
- Reyting Hamdi (2002)
- Ömerçip (2003) - Kahya
- Hababam Sınıfı: Merhaba (2003) - Kötü Kenan / Kenan the Evil
- Şöhretler Kebapçıs (2003)
- Cennet Mahallesi (2004)
- Biz Boşanıyoruz (2004, TV Mini-Series) - Ali Kiran
- Hababam Sınıfı Askerde (2004) - Kotu Kenan
- Sevda Tepesi (2005, TV Mini-Series) - Bakkal Mülayim
- Emret Komutanım (2005)
- Maskeli Beşler: İntikam Peşinde (2005) - Kamil
- Hababam Sınıfı 3,5 (2005) - Kotu Kenan
- Çılgın Yuva (2005, TV Series) - Çetin
- Avrupa Yakası (2005)
- Küçük Hanımefendi (2006)
- Daha Neler (2006)
- Acemi Cadı (2006)
- Eve Dönüş (2006) - Cahit
- Maskeli Beşler: Irak (2007) - Onbasi Kamil
- Emret Komutanım: Şah Mat (2007) - Habip
- Küçük Hanımefendinin Şoförü (2007, TV Movie)
- Düş Yakamdan (2007, TV Series) - Ugur
- Sardunya Sokağı (2007)
- Yasak Elma (2007)
- Şöhret Okulu (2007)
- Maskeli Beşler: Kıbrıs (2008) - Kamil
- Süper Ajan K9 (2008) - De Sifre
- Derman (2008)
- Ece (2008, TV Series) - Perte
- 7 Kocalı Hürmüz (2009) - Barber Hasan
- Harbi Define (2010) - Cemil
- Çakallarla Dans (2010) - Adnan
- Sov bizinis (2011)
- Kız Annesi (2011, TV Series) - Cevher
- İkizler Firarda (2012) - Kazim
- Şipşak Anadolu (2013)
- Evliya Çelebi ve Ölümsüzlük Suyu (2014) - Kaz (voice)
- Can Tertip (2015)
- Kertenkele (2015)
- Arka Sokaklar (2015)
- Klavye Delikanlıları (2017, TV Series)
- Hayvanat bahçesi (2018)
