= Seda Eğridere =

Turkish actress and director

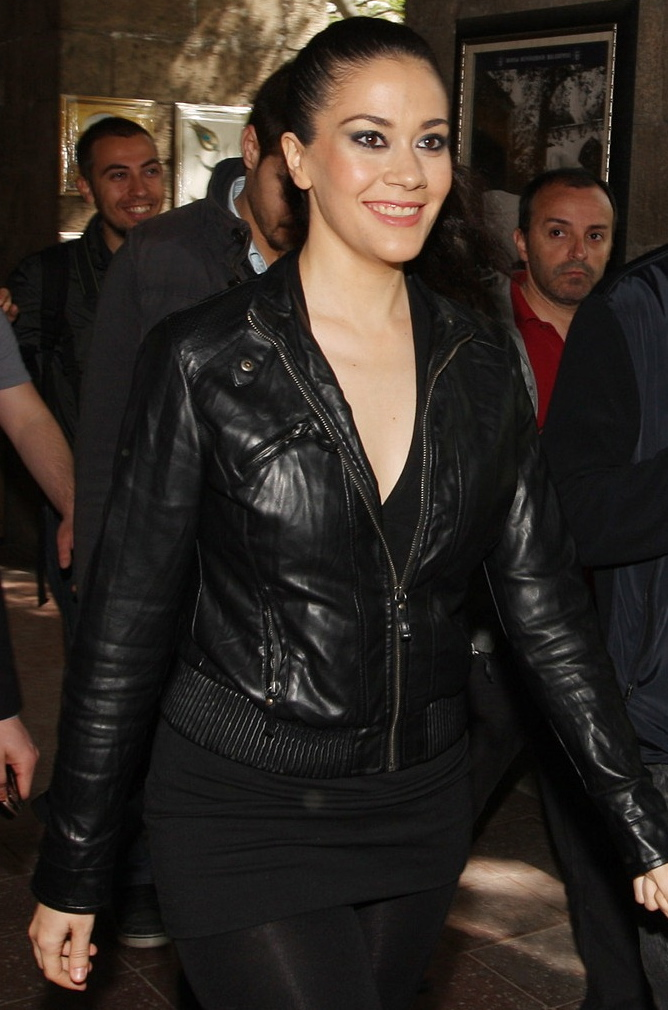
- Eğridere on the set of Alina, the Turkish Assassin, 2012
- Born: March 16, 1982 (age 44); Bursa, Turkey
- Education: The Lee Strasberg Theatre and Film Institute; Boğaziçi University
- Occupations: Actress, director, screenwriter
- Years active: 2010–present

Seda Eğridere (born March 16, 1982) is a Turkish actress and film director. Eğridere acted in Alina, the Turkish Assassin. In an interview with Hurriyet, Bobby Roth said "I accepted the project and agreed to shoot in Turkey only because I trusted Seda." In 2014, Eğridere made her directorial debut with the wartime drama Seasons of War, a story about a multi-ethnic couple during the Siege of Sarajevo.

== Early life and education ==
Born in Bursa, Turkey, Seda Eğridere is the daughter of Ahmet Eğridere, a prominent business figure in Bursa, Turkey, and Sadriye Eğridere. She is of Bulgarian and Turkish descent. Both of her parents emigrated to Turkey in the 1950s and 1970s. Eğridere attended Inal Ertekin Elementary School, the oldest and most successful elementary school in Bursa, Turkey and Bursa Anadolu Lisesi, one of the most prominent high schools in the West Anatolian area of Turkey.

Eğridere moved to Evansville, Wisconsin, for her senior year of high school as an exchange student and participated in several stage productions at Evansville High School and many community theaters in Wisconsin including American Players Theater. Despite starting to gain recognition as an actress and being accepted to prestigious acting schools, she chose to double-major in Psychology and English Literature at Boğaziçi University, the highest ranking university in Turkey. During college, she did exchange semesters at Arizona State University where she was one of the founders of the non-profit cultural organization, Bosphorus Art Project. With Bosphorus Art Project, Eğridere organized Turkish film days at the Phoenix Film Festival, with the goal of building a bridge between Turkish and American cultures. After graduating from college, Eğridere decided to pursue her passion of acting and filmmaking and enrolled at the Lee Strasberg Theatre Institute. She acted in leading roles in many productions during her time in Los Angeles, including Proof, Closer and The Shape of Things and became one of the most recognized stage actors at the institute. Apart from her work in the entertainment industry, over the years, Eğridere continued her career in psychology and published articles in the field of neuropsychology in leading scientific journals.

== Acting career ==
Eğridere began her professional career in film in 2010 when she was cast as the title character Alina in the feature film, Alina, the Turkish Assassin. Consulting director/producer for the film was the American director Bobby Roth whose directing credits include Lost, Prison Break, Revenge and Agents of S.H.I.E.L.D.. Upon being cast as the titular character, Eğridere persuaded director Roth to shoot parts of the film in her home country. The casting process for the male lead actor was diligent and producers had difficulty finding a Turkish actor who spoke good English but finally, in 2012, Turkish actor, Tamer Karadağlı was cast to play the male lead opposite Eğridere. For the movie, Eğridere was required to speak Russian, Spanish and Arabic, undergo extensive martial arts training and learn to ride a motorcycle. She was celebrated for her physical performance and the sex scenes with Tamer Karadağlı generated a lot of buzz around the film.

Before the production started on Alina, the Turkish Assassin, Eğridere appeared in a guest role in 2011, in the award-winning feature film Hicaz, the directorial debut of Erdal Rahmi Hanay. Recently, Eğridere started to work on her latest project, an independent feature, Inside Out, for which she wrote the script as well as producing it. She stars as Azra Yilmaz, a Turkish art curator who moves to Los Angeles to expand her influence in the art gallery scene.

== Directing career ==
In 2014, Eğridere started working on her directorial feature debut with Seasons of War, a love story about a multi-ethnic married couple in Sarajevo over the course of 4 years from Spring 1992 to Winter 1995 during the 1992–95 Bosnian War. Eğridere had the idea for the film when she was traveling in the Balkans, doing research on her own family history and their experiences in Bulgaria in the 1950s and 1970s. After visiting Bosnia and Herzegovina and realizing the similarities between her own family's experience and the experiences of local Sarajevans, she wrote the script for Seasons of War with her writing partner Mark Harley. The script was based on true events during the Bosnian War, of which Eğridere later said "I have a personal connection to the story. I wanted to make a documentary about my family history and I went to Bulgaria to do research. I traveled all of the Balkans. During my trip, I met a woman in Bosnia, who inspired the character of Jelena in the movie. This woman told me her story and it was exactly the same story I heard from my grandparents: a young couple forced to make difficult choices and are discriminated because of their nationalities and religion. It was the same story, yet there was almost half a century in between. At that moment, I realized I had to do the film because same story repeats throughout history; different times, different countries but the story remains the same. I am sure there are Russian-Ukrainian families or many others around the world who are currently going through the same hell. I just had to tell the story and raise awareness to the topic."

Eğridere cast only actors from the former Yugoslavia, most of whom lived through the war—including stars Adnan Novo and Sanja Popovic—and incorporated their experiences into her script. Production of the film was delayed due to 2014 Southeast Europe floods. Eğridere appealed via her official Twitter and Facebook profiles for donations to help the flood victims and pledged to donate all the funds raised through the film's Indiegogo campaign to aid in flood relief in the region. Before the production of the film started, Eğridere was compared to Angelina Jolie and Seasons of War was compared to Jolie's directorial debut In the Land of Blood and Honey, of which Eğridere explained that she watched and respected Jolie's work both as a director and a scriptwriter but Seasons of War was a totally different film that followed a totally different story line and that her film was not a war film but was a film simply about a couple and the difficult choices they had to make.
