= Living & Dying =

- Directed by: Jon Keeyes
- Written by: Jon Keeyes
- Starring: Edward Furlong; Michael Madsen; Bai Ling; Arnold Vosloo
- Cinematography: Sammy Inayeh
- Edited by: Robert J. Castaldo
- Release date: 2007
- Country: United States
- Language: English

Living & Dying is a 2007 film starring Edward Furlong and Michael Madsen. The film was shot on location in Dallas and Fort Worth, Texas. It was released on DVD in the US on December 25, 2007. Living & Dying tells the story of two killers who turn the tables on a group of bank robbers after a botched heist.

== Plot summary ==
Four people rob the vault of a bank at gunpoint. The only trouble is that a large armed police presence turns up as they try to drive away. They take shelter in a diner, where two psychos with guns, Max and Karl decide to take over, and have the (about) $500,000 for themselves.

The robbers become victims with the owners of the diner and the people who were eating there. At first Max and Karl let Sam, one of the robbers do all the talking to Det. Devlin, not letting on that they are there also. But then they decide to make demands as telephone negotiations are going nowhere and shoot one of the hostages in front of the police.

Lind, another negotiator has turned up and takes over, with a gung-ho attitude. A TV reporter is allowed in with a camera to film what they allow, but Max sees her hidden camera which is showing the police what is really going on there and for that she is brutally raped and dumped in a store room.

Devlin has been looking at the bank tapes and see that some of the money the robbers took was not supposed to be there. The bank manager confesses it was payment for an (illegal) arms deal. A phone call shows Lind to be fake and he is shot while shooting his accomplice.

A hidden phone reveals to the hostages that one of the robbers was an undercover cop (who has been shot dead) who would have a second gun, which a young woman manages to get and hand to Sam.

There is a shoot out and dozens of bullets from each gun, with few hits. The cops rush in and the siege is over, but there is still a surprise ending.

== Cast ==
- Edward Furlong as Sam
- Michael Madsen as Agent Lind
- Arnold Vosloo as Detective Rick Devlin
- Bai Ling as Nadia
- Jordana Spiro as Mary Jane
- Tamer Karadağlı as Duca
- Brandy Little as Alice
- Yelda Reynaud as Detective Catherine Pulliam
- Deniz Akkaya as Anne Noble
- Trent Haaga as Max
- Maurice Ripke as Bud
- John F. Beach as Hodges
- Curtis Wayne as Karl
- Libby Villari as Miriam
- Hayden Tweedie as Jenny
- Monica Dean as Detective Lascar
- Matthew Tompkins as Sergeant McCrea
- Brady Coleman as Harold
- Matthew Posey as Captain Burleson
- Ken Thomas as Officer Bishop
- Tom Zembrod as Bill
- Robin McGee as Mr. Gris
- Małgorzata Kożuchowska as Paulina
- Jason Hammond as Fred
- Marvin Frank Stone III as Uniformed Command Center Cop
- Brandon Baker as 21 Jump Baker
- Glenn Bradley as Officer Walker
- Mark Andrew Clark as Miami "Serpico" Clark
- Nicole Holt as Onlooker
- Todd Jenkins as Officer Smith
- Natalie Jones as Bank Teller
- Steve Krieger as Sharpshooter
- Yvonna Lynn as Officer Hardin
- Michael Magnus as News Cameraman
- Robert N. McLain as Officer Dalton
- Reece Rios as The Postman
- Marti Twombly as Officer Bonny

== Producers ==
- Brandon Baker .... producer
- Laszlo Bene .... line producer
- Mark Andrew Clark .... associate producer
- Elif Dağdeviren .... executive producer
- Ron Gell .... producer
- Nesim Hason .... producer
- Sezin Hason .... executive producer
- Bülent Helvacı .... executive producer
- Jon Keeyes .... producer

== Production ==
Deniz Akkaya admitted that she had a hard time in the rape scene: "I saw the actors there for the first time. It was very difficult for me, but it ended in one shot. We didn't have to shoot it over and over."
