= The Masked Gang =

The Masked Singer
- Theatrical poster
- Directed by: Murat Aslan
- Written by: Murat Aslan
- Produced by: Murat Aslan
- Starring: Şafak Sezer; Mehmet Ali Alabora; Peker Açıkalın; Cengiz Küçükayvaz; Melih Ekener; Ceyhun Yılmaz; Sümer Tilmaç
- Cinematography: Ertunç Şenkay
- Edited by: Erkan Özekan
- Music by: Kıraç
- Production companies: Arzu Film; Fida Film
- Distributed by: Özen Film; Maxximum Film
- Release date: October 28, 2005
- Running time: 98 mins
- Country: Turkey
- Language: Turkish

The Masked Gang (Turkish: Maskeli Beşler İntikam Peşinde) is a 2005 Turkish comedy film directed by Murat Aslan. The film, which is about an incompetent gang of criminals attempting the biggest robbery of their careers, is based on Maskeli Beşler (1968) and was followed by The Masked Gang: Iraq (2007) and The Masked Gang: Cyprus (2008). It went on general release across Turkey on October 28, 2005 and was one of the highest-grossing Turkish film of 2005.

== Synopsis ==
Five mischievous kids who grew up in an orphanage, but failed to be placed with any foster families because of their naughtiness, decide to form a gang as they are adults now. Their intentions are indisputable, but their skills are not. However, when the child of very close friend is stricken with cancer and must be treated abroad, it becomes inevitable to plan the biggest robbery of their lives in spite of all their clumsiness.

== Release ==
The film opened on general release in 215 screens across Turkey on October 28, 2005 at number two in the Turkish box office chart with a worldwide opening weekend gross of $541,340.

== Reception ==
The movie reached number one at the Turkish box office and was one of the highest grossing Turkish film of 2005 with a total gross of $3,653,666.
