= Eylem Şenkal =

Turkish volleyball player, model, and actress

Eylem Şenkal (born 21 June 1976) is a Turkish model, TV star and volleyball player in Turkey.

She did her secondary studies in Kadir Has High School and then registered at Istanbul University and she graduated in Sport Academy of Marmara University.

In sports, she was a professional volleyball player for Fenerbahçe and she played for the national team. She also played for Yeşilyurt. She returned to volleyball again after many years and currently she plays for Teşvikiye İhtisas SK at the amateur level.

== See also ==
- Turkish women in sports
