= Şafak Sezer =

Turkish actor

- Born: Erol Şafak Sezer; 10 October 1970 (age 55); Sincan, Ankara Province, Turkey
- Occupations: Actor, writer, director
- Years active: 1989–present
- Height: 1.73 m (5 ft 8 in)
- Spouse: Esra Sezer
- Children: 2
- Website: safaksezer.com

Erol Şafak Sezer (born 10 October 1970) is a Turkish actor who usually appears in comedic roles.

His stage debut came in Haldun Taner's play Eşeğin Gölgesi at Ankara Halk Tiyatrosu (Ankara People's Theatre). He acted in several other plays at the same venue as well as at Ankara Ekin Tiyatrosu (Ankara Crop Theatre).

In cinema, he initially appeared in supporting roles in several movies. His breakthrough came with Kolpaçino (2009) in which he starred.

Şafak Sezer was found guilty of physically attacking a camera assistant for "making noise" on the set of Alemin Kralı TV series in 2012, and a 13-month prison sentence was demanded for him in December 2013. The announcement of the verdict was postponed to a later date.

Sezer rose once again to public's attention in 2013 when he publicly knelt in front of Turkey's Prime Minister and apologized for his earlier participation in protest demonstrations. Turkish newspapers reported, with accompanying photographs, on 22 July 2013 that at a Ramadan dinner hosted by the ruling AK Party on the previous evening, Sezer went to Prime Minister Recep Tayyip Erdoğan's table and went down on his knees in front of Erdoğan and apologized for his participation in a street demonstration protesting a police crackdown ordered by the government on environmentalists in Istanbul in the previous weeks.

== Filmography ==
- Bir Düğün Masalı (1993) Lawyer Adnan
- Televizyon Çocuğu (1996) (Guest appearance)
- Baskül Ailesi (TV series) (1997) Maşallah
- Dostlar Pasajı (TV series) (1997) Yıldırım
- Komşu Komşu (TV series) (1997) (Guest appearance)
- Sıdıka (TV series) (1997) Kenar
- Şafak Vakti (TV series) (1997) (Konuk oyuncu)
- Vizontele (2000) Veli
- Oyunbozan (2000) Police
- Reyting Hamdi (TV series) (2000) Şafak
- Bu Film Bitmez (2001)
- Zalim (TV series) (2002) (Guest appearance)
- Rus Gelin (2002) Ökkeş
- Ekmek Teknesi (2002) Bahtiyar
- Hababam Sınıfı Merhaba (2003) Ercüment
- G.O.R.A (2004) Kuna
- Hababam Sınıfı Askerde (2004) Ercüment
- Simbiyotik (2004)
- Altın Kafes (TV series) (2004) Fuzili
- Hababam Sınıfı 3,5 (2005) Ercüment
- Maskeli Beşler İntikam Peşinde (2005) Tezcan
- Bendeniz Aysel (Dizi) (2005) Aslan
- Ah Polis Olsam (Dizi) (2006) Rıfat / Komiser Yardımcısı
- Maskeli Beşler: Irak (2006) Tezcan
- Düş Yakamdan (TV series) (2007) Süleyman
- Kutsal Damacana (2007) Fikret
- Fesupanallah (TV series) (2007) Cesur
- Maskeli Beşler: Kıbrıs (2008) Tezcan
- Yaşar Ne Yaşar Ne Yaşamaz (Television film) (2008)
- Kadri'nin Götürdüğü Yere Git (2008) Kadri
- Aynadaki Düşman (TV series) (2009) Çelebi
- Kolpaçino (2009) Özgür
- Kutsal Damacana 2: İtmen (2009) Fikret
- Hanımeli Sokağı (TV series) (2009) Ramazan
- Türk Malı (2010) Erman Kuzu
- Memlekette Demokrasi Var (2010) Jandarma
- Kolpaçino Bomba (2011) Özgür
- Alemin Kıralı (TV series) (2011) Aslan Kıral
- Memlekette Demokrasi Var (2011)
- G.D.O. KaraKedi (2013) Gürkan
- Altındağlı (2013) Ekrem Altındağlı
- Ah Polis Olsam Yeniden (TV series) (2014) Komiser
- Şimdi Onlar Düşünsün (2014–2015) Aziz Keklik
- O Ses Türkiye New Year Program (2015)
- Kolpaçino 3. Devre (2016) Özgür
- Bir Baba Hindu (2016)
- Türk Malı Aile Komedisi (2017)
- Ketenpere (2017)
- Gürbüz: Hadi Allah'a Emanet (2018)
- Göktaşı (2018)
- Yalan Dolan (2019)
