= Peker Açıkalın =

Turkish actor (born 1963)

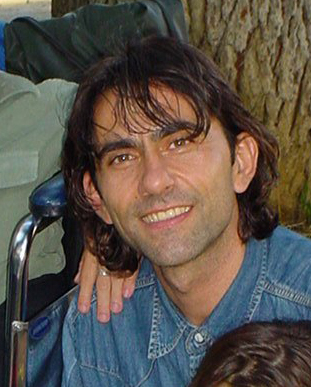
- Born: March 1, 1963 (age 63); Kars, Turkey
- Occupations: Actor, comedian
- Years active: 1985–present
- Spouses: Nilüfer Açıkalın (m. 1987; div. 1994) Niran Ünsal (m. 1999; div. 2000) Melek Perim Taşkın (m. 2005; div. 2007)
- Children: 2

Peker Açıkalın (born March 1, 1963) is a Turkish actor who usually appears in comedic roles.

== Early life and career ==
His paternal family are immigrants from Skopje, while his maternal family are immigrants from Thessaloniki.

He graduated from the Istanbul University State Conservatory. After graduating, he performed in the theatre companies of Nedim Saban, Taner Barlas, and Ali Poyrazoğlu. In 1987, he married Nilüfer Açıkalın; the couple divorced in 1994.

He first appeared before a wider audience in 1989 with the television program Kim Bunlar? broadcast on TRT 1. The program also featured Levent Tülek. He became widely known for his role as Fırıldak Ömer in the television series Çiçek Taksi. He subsequently appeared in numerous television series. In the television series Avrupa Yakası, he portrayed the character Gaffur, a building doorman. His distinctive “Çakkıdı” dance associated with the character became widely recognized. However, he left the cast after approximately one and a half years for various reasons. The series continued with the addition of Binnur Kaya and Gürgen Öz to the cast.

He later appeared in the TRT 1 series Mert ile Gert, starring Emre Altuğ and Ragga Oktay, where he played the son of the character Poyraz portrayed by Zihni Göktay. A year later, he joined the television series Yahşi Cazibe but left the production after a short period. Explaining his decision, he stated that the influence of the character he portrayed had gradually been reduced and that he chose to leave when he saw no change, adding that "everything is not about money."

In 2011, he suffered a heart attack during an argument in Kadıköy, Istanbul.

== Biography ==
Peker Açıkalın was born in Kars on March 1, 1963. He grew up as one of three children in İstanbul. Despite his parents‘ pressure for him to join the family's manufacturing business, he pursued his dream to become an actor. Açıkalın made his first television appearance in Kim Bunlar? on TRT 1. He gained widespread fame for his roles in the comedy series Çiçek Taksi and as Gaffur in Avrupa Yakası.

== Filmography ==
=== Television ===
- 1989: Kim Bunlar
- 1991: İşte Onlar
- 1992: Deli Dolu
- 1994: Gülşen Abi - Alper
- 1995: Çiçek Taksi - Ömer Şen
- 2003: Ev Hali - Oral
- 2005: Ekmek Teknesi - Cengiz
- 2006: Avrupa Yakası - Gaffur Aksoy
- 2007: Yalan Dünya - Nibun
- 2008: Mert ile Gert - Cenabettin Seçkin
- 2010: Yahşi Cazibe - Peker Pekmez
- 2012: Türk'ün Uzayla İmtihanı - Ziya
- 2018: Ege'nin Hamsisi - Horoz Ağa
- 2023: Başım Belada

=== Film ===
- 1999: Kara Kentin Çocukları - Özgür
- 2002: Kolay Para - Ender
- 2003: Hababam Sınıfı Merhaba - Psiko
- 2004: Hababam Sınıfı Askerde - Psiko
- 2005: O Şimdi Mahkum - Erketeci
- 2005: Maskeli Beşler İntikam Peşinde - Bahattin
- 2005: Hababam Sınıfı Üç Buçuk - Psiko
- 2006: Maskeli Beşler: Irak - Bahattin
- 2006: Amerikalılar Karadeniz'de 2 - Ercüment
- 2008: Maskeli Beşler: Kıbrıs - Bahattin
- 2008: Destere - Hayrettin
- 2009: Türkler Çıldırmış Olmalı - Kadir
- 2014: Gülcemal - Gülcemal
- 2014: Polis Akademisi Alaturka - Kinyas
- 2017: Vezir Parmağı - Nazik
- 2018: Baba 1.5 - Seyfi
- 2018: Karımı Gördünüz Mü? - Hakkı Geçer
- TBD: Türkler Çıldırmış Olmalı 2 - Kadir
