= Cem Erman =

Turkish actor

- Birth name: Süleyman Faik Durgun
- Born: 1947; İskenderun, Turkey
- Origin: Turkey
- Died: 7 August 2011 (aged 63–64); Adana, Turkey
- Occupation: Actor

Cem Erman (born Süleyman Faik Durgun; 1947 – 7 August 2011) was a Turkish film actor. His father's side was originally from Mersin and his mother's side was from Halep. In 2007 he married Sevim Demiroğlu, then shortly after their marriage, they divorced. After a while they start having a relationship again and till his death the couple were together. He died while he was reading a book. He was buried in Kabasakal Cemetery.

== Overview ==
His career in the show business started in 1973 as he reached the third place in a competition supported by the Ses magazine.

He performed in more than 100 Turkish films, and also His character has been used also in comics for both Turkish newspapers Saklambaç and Kelebek. He has never been paid properly during his acting career according to his statement when he was interviewed about his earning.

== Filmography ==
He has acted in numerous Turkish films:

- Özleyiş (1974) (he was the main character in the film),
- Öfke (he was the main character in the film)
- Üç Öfkeli Adam (Three Angry Men, he was the main character in the film)
- Ağa Bacı (1986) (he was the main character in the film)
- Talihsizler (1974)
- Yüz Numaralı Adam (1978)
- Sahibini Arayan Madalya
- Sen Yaşa
- Canımın Canısın
- Canımdan Can
