= Melih Ekener =

Turkish actor (born 1965)

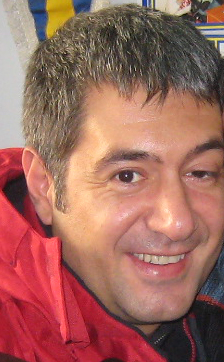
- Born: 13 July 1965 (age 60); Istanbul, Turkey
- Occupations: Actor, comedian

Melih Ekener (born 13 July 1965) is a Turkish Armenian actor who usually appears in comedic roles.

== Biography ==
Born in Istanbul, Ekener started his professional acting career at the Kenter Theatre and later joined the Hadi Çaman Yeditepe Oyuncuları. He first appeared on television on TRT's Yarı Şaka Yarı Ciddi comedy show. Later he produced the shows Seç Bakalım, Parola, Kolaysa Sen de Gel and Dekolte shown on Kanal 6, ATV and Kanal D respectively. He made his film debut in Ferdi Eğilmez's reboot of the Hababam Sinifi series as Bebe Ruhi.

Currently he is the manager of the Christian satellite television SAT-7 TÜRK.
