= Sümer Tilmaç =

Turkish actor (1948–2015)

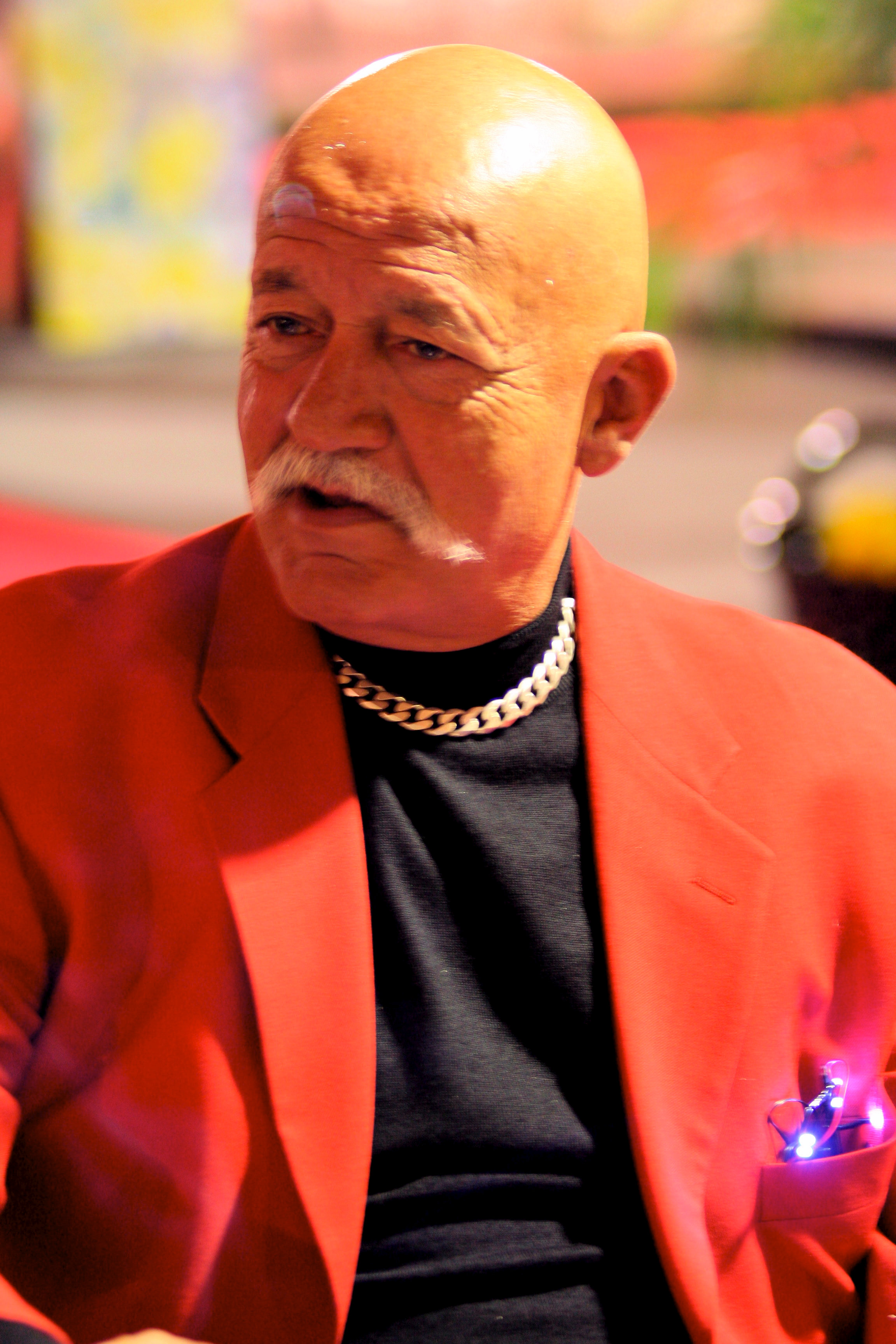
- Born: July 15, 1948; Malatya, Turkey
- Died: June 12, 2015 (aged 66); Istanbul, Turkey
- Resting place: Karacaahmet Cemetery
- Occupation: Actor
- Spouse(s): Nazan Karaca (1968–1989); Melek Konuk (1989–2007)
- Children: 2

Sümer Tilmaç (July 15, 1948 – June 12, 2015) was a Turkish actor. He started his theatre and film acting career in 1962 and took part in many theater plays. He acted in various films and television series. He also worked in Antalya State Theatre for three years.

Though born in Malatya, Turkey, in 1948, he grew up in Antalya. He opened a restaurant in Istanbul where only items from Antalya Cuisine were served. After the restaurant in Istanbul was closed, he devoted his time to her wife's orange farm (Melek's Farm) in Serik, Antalya where he and his wife served local cuisine along with local arts to visitors. His career in acting continued with various television, advertising, film, and stage arts projects.

Tilmaç died of a heart attack at the age of 66.
