= Çağlar (name) =

- Gender: Male
- Language: Turkish

Origin
- Origin: Turkish
- Derivation: çağlamak
- Meaning: "Waterfall", "lively"
- Region of origin: Turkey

Other names
- Variant forms: Çağlarcan, Çağlaralp

Çağlar is a Turkish masculine given name and surname that means "waterfall" or "lively".

== Etymology ==
Çağlar originates from the Turkish word çağlayan, translating to "waterfall", which derives from çağlamak, meaning "the sound of flowing water".

Çağlar is also known to mean "era" or "age", deriving from the Turkish word çağ. It can be interpreted as "through long ages" or "lively".

== Given name ==
- Çağlar Şahin Akbaba (born 1995), Turkish footballer
- Çağlar Birinci (born 1985), Turkish footballer
- Çağlar Çorumlu (born 1977), Turkish actor
- Çağlar Demirel (born 1969), Kurdish origin Turkish politician
- Çağlar Ertuğrul (born 1987), Turkish actor
- Çağlar Söyüncü (born 1996), Turkish professional footballer

== Surname ==
- Alkan Çağlar (born 1981), Turkish-Cypriot journalist and a columnist for the weekly (English-Turkish) newspaper Toplum Postası
- Alper Çağlar (born 1981), Turkish film director
- Bahar Çağlar (born 1988), Turkish professional basketball player
- Bakır Çağlar (1941–2011), Turkish jurist, lawyer and academic
- Behçet Kemal Çağlar (1908–1969), Turkish composer and politician
- Cavit Çağlar (born 1944), Turkish businessman and politician
- Derya Çağlar (born 1882), German politician
- Ece Ayhan Çağlar (1931–2002), Turkish poet
- Engin Çağlar (1940–2025), Turkish actor
- Ezgi Çağlar (born 1991), Turkish women's goalkeeper
- Reşat Çağlar, diplomat from the Turkish Republic of Northern Cyprus
- Sıla Çağlar (born 2004), Turkish chess player
