= İlayda =

İlayda is originally from Germany [from the name Adelaide] but also used as a common Turkish given name. It is commonly interpreted as meaning "water fairy" or "goddess of water" in Turkish mythology and folk usage.

== People ==
=== Given name ===
- İlayda Akdoğan (born 1998), Turkish actress and YouTuber
- İlayda Alişan (born 1996), Turkish actress
- İlayda Alkan (born 1998), Turkish volleyball player
- İlayda Bostancıeri (born 1995), German politician
- İlayda Cansu Kara (born 2005), Turkish footballer
- İlayda Çevik (born 1994), Turkish actress
- İlayda Elif Elhih, Turkish actress
- İlayda Güner (born 1999), Turkish basketball player
- Şevval İlayda Tarhan (born 2000), Turkish sports shooter
