= Burak Çelik =

Turkish actor and model (born 1992)

- Born: 21 July 1992 (age 34); Istanbul, Turkey
- Occupations: Actor; model
- Years active: 2013–present
- Spouses: Ayşenur Özkan (m. 2013; div. 2015) Ece Bayrak (m. 2024)
- Children: 2

Burak Çelik (born 21 July 1992) is a Turkish actor, model and beauty pageant titleholder. He was best known for playing the role of Goktuğ in Kuruluş Osman and Mahir Denizhan in Sevgili Geçmiş.

== Life and career ==
His maternal family immigrated from Balkan, Ottoman Empire. His paternal family is from Ordu. His uncle is a football player. At the age of thirteen, Burak Çelik left football due to asthma. In 2013, Çelik competed in the Best Model of Turkey and Best Model of World beauty pageants and finished in the first place.

Çelik started his acting career with the series Karagül, in which he portrayed the character of Serdar for 100 episodes. He then had a leading role in the Hayat Sevince Güzel TV series, playing the role of Barış.

His action roles are in Kuruluş: Osman, military series Söz which was nominated for International Emmy Awards and Ben Bu Cihana Sığmazam.

With his Karagül co-stars Sevda Erginci, Ece Uslu and Kuruluş: Osman co-star Seçkin Özdemir and Kara Yazı co-star Emre Kınay, he played in Sevgili Geçmiş. With his Ben Bu Cihana Sığmazam co-star Pelin Akil, he played in the comedy film Deli Aşk. He also played in Senden Daha Güzel alongside Cemre Baysel.

== Personal life ==
Çelik was married with actress and model Ayşenur Özkan from 2013 until their divorce in 2015. On 27 December 2024, he married his girlfriend Ece Bayrak.

== Filmography ==
Film
Year	Title	Role
2017	Deli Aşk	Jeremy Jackson
2017	Karanlıktaki Melekler	Berk

Series
Year	Title	Role
2013–2016	Karagül	Serdar Kılıçoğlu
2016	Hayat Sevince Güzel	Barış
2017	Kara Yazı	Erdem Demir
2017–2018	Söz	Selim
2019	Sevgili Geçmiş	Mahir Denizhan
2019–2022	Kuruluş: Osman	Kongar/Göktuğ
2022	Senden Daha Güzel	Emir Demirhan
2022–2024	Ben Bu Cihana Sığmazam	Ateş türk
2024–2025	Hudutsuz Sevda	Kaan
2026	Yeraltı	Volkan
2026	Haysiyet	Tarık

== Awards and nominations ==
Awards and nominations
Year	Award	Result
2013	Best Model of Turkey	1st place
