= Arabs in Turkey =

Ethnic group in the Republic of Turkey

عرب تركيا

Total population
- 1,500,000 – 2,000,000 (2011) (Pre-Syrian Civil War Arab minority); 4,000,000 – 5,000,000 (2017) (Including Syrian refugees)

Regions with significant populations
- Mainly Southeastern Anatolia Region, also in Mediterranean Region and Eastern Anatolia Region

Languages
- Arabic • Turkish

Religion
- Predominately Sunni Islam, minority Christianity, minority Alawite

Related ethnic groups
- Arab diaspora, Arabs

Arabs in Turkey (Turkish: Türkiye Arapları; Arabic: عرب تركيا) are about 1.5 million or 5 million (including the Syrian refugees) citizens or residents of Turkey who are ethnically of Arab descent. They are the third-largest minority in the country after the Kurds and the Circassians and are concentrated in a few provinces in Southeastern Anatolia. In addition to the native group, millions of Arab Syrian refugees have sought refuge in Turkey since the beginning of the Syrian civil war in 2011.

== Background ==
Besides the large communities of both foreign and Turkish Arabs in Istanbul and other large cities, most live in the south and southeast.

Turkish Arabs are mostly Muslims living along the southeastern border with Syria and Iraq but also in Mediterranean coastal regions in the following provinces: Batman, Bitlis, Gaziantep, Hatay, Mardin, Muş, Siirt, Şırnak, Şanlıurfa, Mersin and Adana. Many tribes, in addition to other Arabs who settled there, arrived before Turkic tribes came to Anatolia from Central Asia in the 11th century. Many of these Arabs have ties to Arabs in Syria and Saudi Arabia, especially in the city of Raqqa. Arab society in Turkey has been subject to Turkification, yet a good number of them speak Arabic in addition to Turkish. The Treaty of Lausanne ceded to Turkey large areas that had been part of Ottoman Syria, especially in Aleppo Vilayet.

Besides a significant Shafi'i Sunni population, about 300,000 to 350,000 are Alawites (distinct from Alevism). About 18,000 Arab Christians belong mostly to the Greek Orthodox Church of Antioch. There are also few Arab Jews in Hatay and other Turkish parts of the former Aleppo Vilayet, but this community has shrank considerably since the late 1940s, mostly due to migration to Israel and other parts of Turkey.

== History ==
=== Pre-Islamic period ===
Upper Mesopotamia region and its subdivisions (Diyar Bakr, Diyar Mudar, and Diyar Rabi'a), during the Umayyad and Abbasid calipahtes.

Arabs presence in what used to be called Asia Minor dates back to the Hellenistic period. The Arab dynasty of the Abgarids were rulers of the Kingdom of Osroene, with its capital in the ancient city of Edessa (Modern day city of Urfa). According to Retsö, the Arabs presence in Edessa dates back to AD 49. In addition, the Roman author Pliny the Elder refers to the natives of Osroene as Arabs and the region as Arabia. In the nearby Tektek Mountains, Arabs seem to have made it the seat of the governors of 'Arab. An early Arab figure who flourished in Anatolia is the 2nd century grammarian Phrynichus Arabius, specifically in the Roman province of Bithynia. Another example is the 4th century Roman politician Domitius Modestus who was appointed by Emperor Julian to the position of Praefectus urbi of Constantinople (Modern day Istanbul). And under Emperor Valens, he became Praetorian Prefect of the East whose seat was also in Constantinople. In the 6th century, the famous Arab poet Imru' al-Qais journeyed to Constantinople in the time of Byzantine Emperor Justinian I. On his way back, it is said that he died and was buried at Ancyra (Modern day Ankara) in the Central Anatolia Region.

=== The age of Islam ===
In the early Islamic conquests, the Rashidun Caliphate successful campaigns in the Levant lead to the fall of the Ghassanids. The last Ghassanid king Jabalah ibn al-Aiham with as many as 30,000 Arab followers managed to avoid the punishment of the Caliph Umar by escaping to the domains of the Byzantine Empire. King Jabalah ibn al-Aiham established a government-in-exile in Constantinople and lived in Anatolia until his death in 645. Following the early Muslim conquests, Asia Minor became the main ground for the Arab-Byzantine wars. Among those Arabs who were killed in the wars was Abu Ayyub al-Ansari, a companion of the Islamic prophet Muhammad. Abu Ayyub was buried at the walls of Constantinople. Centuries later, after the Ottomans conquest of the city, a tomb above Abu Ayyub's grave was constructed and a mosque built by the name of Eyüp Sultan Mosque. From that point on, the area became known as the locality of Eyup by the Ottoman officials. Another instance of Arab presence in what is nowadays Turkey is the settlement of Arab tribes in the 7th century in the region of Al-Jazira (Upper Mesopotamia), that partially encompasses Southeastern Turkey. Among those tribes are the Banu Bakr, Mudar, Rabi'ah ibn Nizar and Banu Taghlib.

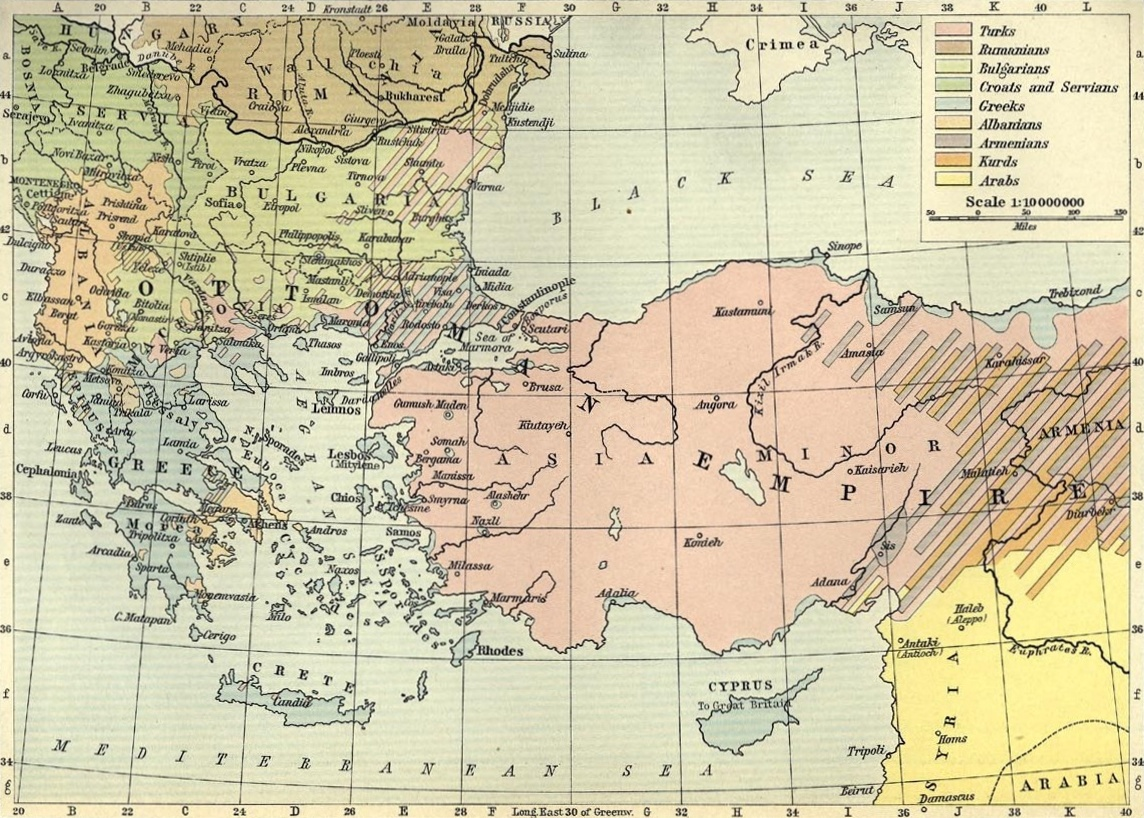
Map from 1911 showing the ethnic composition of Turkey and the Levant area

== Demographics ==
Arabic-speaking population in Turkey
Year	Turkey's population	As a first language	%	As a second language	Total Speakers	%
1927 census	13,629,488	134,273	0.99	-	134,273	0.99
1935 census	16,157,450	153,687	0.95	34,028	187,715	1.16
1945 census	18,790,174	247,294	1.32	60,061	307,355	1.64
1950 census	20,947,188	269,038	1.28	-	269,038	1.28
1955 census	24,064,763	300,583	1.25	95,612	396,195	1.65
1960 census	27,754,820	347,690	1.25	134,962	482,652	1.74
1965 census	31,391,421	365,340	1.16	169,724	533,264	1.70

According to a Turkish study based on a large survey in 2006, 0.7% of the total population in Turkey were ethnically Arab. The population of Arabs in Turkey varies according to different sources. A 1995 American estimate put the numbers between 800,000 and 1 million. According to Ethnologue, in 1992 there were 500,000 people with Arabic as their mother tongue in Turkey. Another Turkish study estimated the Arab population to be between 1.1 and 2.4%.

== Arabs in Cilicia ==
A significant Arab population has long existed in Cilicia in southern Turkey. Most of them are Alawites, but Sunnis and Orthodox Christians are also present. The number of Alawites in the provinces of Adana and Mersin, determined through surveys and field work in 2000, was estimated between 247,000 and 329,000, encompassing the area's three large cities (Adana, Mersin and Tarsus) and the country side. The percentages of Alawite Arab are estimated at 5-6% in Mersin, 10-15% in Adana, and 15-20% in Tarsus. Thirty-two Alawite Arab villages are scattered in the area south of the Adana-Mersin road.

== Notable people ==
- Emine Erdoğan, wife of President Recep Tayyip Erdoğan, whose family is from Siirt.
- Yasin Aktay, aide to President Erdoğan, from Siirt.
- Hüseyin Çelik, politician (Arab father from Tillo).
- Tülay Hatimoğulları Oruç, politician from Samandağ.
- Murat Yıldırım, actor, (Arab mother from Mardin).
- Murathan Mungan, author, (Arab father from Mardin).
- Nicholas Kadi, actor (Iraqi parents).
- Mihrac Ural, militant and leader of the Syrian Resistance from Antakya.
- Nureddin Nebati, politician, from Viranşehir district in Şanlıurfa province.
- Selin Sayek Böke, politician, (Antiochan Greek or Christian Arab father).
- Pınar Deniz, actress, originally from Mardin.
- Sevda Erginci, actress (Arab father from Mardin).
- Selin Şekerci, actress (Arab father).
- İbrahim Tatlıses, actor and singer, (Arab father from Eyyübiye).
- Jehan Barbur, singer and songwriter.
- Atiye, pop singer (Arab father from Antakya).
- Selami Şahin, singer and songwriter (Egyptian Mother)
- Selçuk İnan, football player from İskenderun.
- Muhaymin Mustafa, basketball player (Sudanese parents).
- Murat Salar, football player (Egyptian mother).
- Saruhan Hünel, actor (Iraqi Arab mother).
- Kaan Urgancıoğlu, actor (Syrian Arab-Albanian mother).
- Gökhan Zan, football player of Arab descent from Antakya.
- Bülent İnal, actor (half Arab father from Şanlıurfa)
- Mithat Sancar, politician of Arab descent from Nusaybin, cousin of Aziz Sancar.
- Aziz Sancar, Nobel-winning biochemist from Savur, cousin of Mithat Sancar.
- Yunus Emre Yıldırımer, actor from Siirt

== See also ==
- Turks in the Arab world
- Alawites in Turkey
- Hatay Province
- Anatolian arabic
- Cicilian arabic
- Arab diaspora
- Iraqis in Turkey
- Syrians in Turkey
- Refugees of the Syrian Civil War in Turkey
- Anti-Arabism in Turkey
