= September 24 =

September 24 this year in various calendars
- Thursday, 24 September 2026
Akan	Kwayaw
Armenian	6 Sahmi 1476
Aztec	Tititl 17, 11 Cōātl
Babylonian	11 Ululu, 2337 SE
Balinese pawukon	Menga, Beteng, Jaya, Wage, Was, Wraspati of Bala, Guru, Tulus, Suka
Bengali	9 Ashshin, BS 1433
Chinese	Yin Metal Ox・Dipper Mansion; Fire Horse Year, Month 8, Day 14 (Qiufen, 14 days until Hanlu)
Common Era	24 September 2026 CE
Coptic	14 Thout, AM 1743
Egyptian	11 Mechir, 2775 NE
Ethiopian	14 Maskaram, 2019 Amätä Məhrät
French Republican	Décade I, Duodi de Vendémiaire de l'Année 235 de la République
Gregorian	24 September, AD 2026
Hebrew	13 Tishrei, AM 5787
Hindu	Dhaniṣṭhā・Dhṛti; Solar: 8 Āśvina, 1948 SE; Lunisolar: Trayodaśī, Śukla pakṣa of Bhādrapada, 2083 VE; Rāudra・5127 KY・1,872,842
Icelandic	Fimmtudagur, 1 Haustmánuður 2026
Islamic	11 Rabi' al-thani, AH 1448 (using tabular method)
ISO week date	2026-W39-4
Japanese	14 Hazuki, Reiwa 8 (Shūbun, 14 days until Kanro)
Julian	11 September, AD 2026 (AM 7534)
Julian day	2461308
Korean	14 Dakdal, 4359 DE
Maya	13.0.13.17.5; 18 Chen, 11 Chicchan
Roman	ante diem III Idus Septembres, MMDCCLXXIX AUC
Solar Hijri	2 Mehr, SH 1405
Tibetan	13 khrums, me pho rta 2153 or 1772 or 1000

<<	September					>>
Su	Mo	Tu	We	Th	Fr	Sa
		1	2	3	4	5
6	7	8	9	10	11	12
13	14	15	16	17	18	19
20	21	22	23	24	25	26
27	28	29	30
2026

September 24 in recent years
2026 (Thursday)
2025 (Wednesday)
2024 (Tuesday)
2023 (Sunday)
2022 (Saturday)
2021 (Friday)
2020 (Thursday)
2019 (Tuesday)
2018 (Monday)
2017 (Sunday)

September 24 is the 267th day of the year (268th in leap years) in the Gregorian calendar; 98 days remain until the end of the year.

== Events ==
=== Pre-1600 ===
- 787 – The Second Council of Nicaea begins at the Church of Holy Wisdom in the city of Nicaea in Bithynia.
- 867 – Byzantine emperor Michael III is murdered in his chamber by his junior emperor Basil I.
- 1568 – Spanish naval forces defeat an English fleet, under the command of John Hawkins, at the Battle of San Juan de Ulúa near Veracruz.

=== 1601–1900 ===
- 1645 – The Battle of Rowton Heath in England occurs, ending in a Parliamentarian victory over a Royalist army commanded in person by King Charles I.
- 1674 – Second Tantrik Coronation of Shivaji.
- 1789 – The United States Congress passes the Judiciary Act, creating the office of the Attorney General and federal judiciary system and ordering the composition of the Supreme Court.
- 1830 – A revolutionary committee of notables forms the Provisional Government of Belgium.
- 1841 – The Sultanate of Brunei cedes Sarawak to James Brooke.
- 1846 – Mexican–American War: General Zachary Taylor captures Monterrey.
- 1852 – The first powered, passenger-carrying airship, the Giffard dirigible, travels 17 miles (27 km) from Paris to Trappes.
- 1853 – Admiral Despointes formally takes possession of New Caledonia in the name of France.
- 1869 – Black Friday (1869): Gold prices plummet after United States President Ulysses S. Grant orders the Treasury to sell large quantities of gold after Jay Gould and James Fisk plot to control the market.
- 1875 – The 1864 play Heath Cobblers by Aleksis Kivi premieres in Oulu, Finland.
- 1877 – The Battle of Shiroyama is a decisive victory of the Imperial Japanese Army over the Satsuma Rebellion.
- 1890 – The Church of Jesus Christ of Latter-day Saints officially renounces polygamy.

=== 1901–present ===
- 1906 – U.S. President Theodore Roosevelt proclaims Devils Tower in Wyoming as the nation's first National Monument.
- 1906 – Racial tensions exacerbated by rumors lead to the Atlanta Race Riot, further increasing racial segregation.
- 1911 – His Majesty's Airship No. 1, Britain's first rigid airship, is wrecked by strong winds before her maiden flight at Barrow-in-Furness.
- 1929 – Jimmy Doolittle performs the first flight without a window, proving that full instrument flying from take off to landing is possible.
- 1932 – Mahatma Gandhi and B. R. Ambedkar agree to the Poona Pact, which reserved seats in the Indian provincial legislatures for the "Depressed Classes" (Untouchables).
- 1935 – Earl and Weldon Bascom produce the first rodeo ever held outdoors under electric lights.
- 1946 – Cathay Pacific Airways is founded in Hong Kong.
- 1946 – The top-secret Clifford-Elsey Report on the Soviet Union is delivered to President Truman.
- 1948 – The Honda Motor Company is founded.
- 1950 – The eastern United States is covered by a thick haze from the Chinchaga fire in western Canada.
- 1954 – AEC Routemaster, the iconic London bus was introduced.
- 1954 – The Cochabamba–Santa Cruz highway connecting western and eastern Bolivia is inaugurated.
- 1957 – President Eisenhower sends the 101st Airborne Division to Little Rock, Arkansas, to enforce desegregation.
- 1959 – TAI Flight 307 crashes during takeoff from Bordeaux–Mérignac Airport in Bordeaux, Nouvelle-Aquitaine, France, killing 55 people.
- 1960 – USS Enterprise, the world's first nuclear-powered aircraft carrier, is launched.
- 1972 – Japan Airlines Flight 472 lands at Juhu Aerodrome instead of Santacruz Airport in Bombay, India, overrunning the runway and resulting in 11 injuries.
- 1973 – Guinea-Bissau declares its independence from Portugal.
- 1975 – Southwest Face expedition members become the first persons to reach the summit of Mount Everest by any of its faces, instead of using a ridge route.
- 1993 – The Cambodian monarchy is restored, with Norodom Sihanouk as king.
- 1996 – Representatives of 71 nations sign the Comprehensive Nuclear-Test-Ban Treaty at the United Nations.
- 2005 – Hurricane Rita makes landfall in the United States, devastating portions of southwestern Louisiana and extreme southeastern Texas.
- 2007 – Between 30,000 and 100,000 people take part in anti-government protests in Yangon, Burma, the largest in 20 years.
- 2008 – Thabo Mbeki resigns as president of South Africa.
- 2009 – The G20 summit begins in Pittsburgh with 30 global leaders in attendance.
- 2009 – South African Airlink Flight 8911 crashes near Durban International Airport in Durban, South Africa, killing the captain and injuring the rest of the crew.
- 2013 – A 7.7-magnitude earthquake strikes southern Pakistan, killing at least 327 people.
- 2014 – The Mars Orbiter Mission makes India the first Asian nation to reach Mars orbit, and the first nation in the world to do so in its first attempt.
- 2015 – At least 1,100 people are killed and another 934 wounded after a crush during the Hajj in Saudi Arabia.
- 2023 – NASA's OSIRIS-REx capsule containing samples from the asteroid 101955 Bennu successfully lands back on Earth.

== Births ==
=== Pre-1600 ===
- 15 – Vitellius, Roman emperor (died 69)
- 936 – 'Adud al-Dawla, Buyid king (died 983)
- 1301 – Ralph de Stafford, 1st Earl of Stafford, English soldier (died 1372)
- 1418 – Anne of Cyprus, Duchess of Savoy (probable; (died 1462)
- 1433 – Shekha of Amarsar, Rajput chieftain (died 1488)
- 1473 – Georg von Frundsberg, German Knight and landowner (died 1528)
- 1501 – Gerolamo Cardano, Italian mathematician, physician, and astrologer (died 1576)
- 1534 – Guru Ram Das, fourth Sikh Guru (died 1581)
- 1564 – William Adams, English sailor and navigator (died 1620)
- 1583 – Albrecht von Wallenstein, Bohemian general (died 1634)

=== 1601–1900 ===
- 1625 – Johan de Witt, Dutch mathematician and politician (died 1672)
- 1667 – Jean-Louis Lully, French composer (died 1688)
- 1705 – Count Leopold Joseph von Daun, Austrian field marshal (died 1766)
- 1717 – Horace Walpole, English historian, author, and politician (died 1797)
- 1725 – Arthur Guinness, Irish brewer and founder of the Guinness brewery (died 1803)
- 1755 – John Marshall, American Continental Army officer, jurist, and politician, 4th Chief Justice of the United States Supreme Court (died 1835)
- 1761 – F.L.Æ. Kunzen, German-Danish composer and conductor (died 1817)
- 1796 – Antoine-Louis Barye, French sculptor and educator (died 1875)
- 1801 – Mikhail Ostrogradsky, Ukrainian-Russian mathematician and physicist (died 1862)
- 1802 – Adolphe d'Archiac, French paleontologist and geologist (died 1868)
- 1812 – Mary Ann Browne, British poet and writer of musical scores (died 1845)
- 1817 – Ramón de Campoamor y Campoosorio, Spanish poet and philosopher (died 1901)
- 1829 – Charles S. West, American jurist and politician, Secretary of State of Texas (died 1885)
- 1845 – Nikolai Anderson, Estonian philologist and author (died 1905)
- 1858 – Eugene Foss, American businessman and politician, 45th Governor of Massachusetts (died 1939)
- 1859 – Julius Klengel, German cellist and composer (died 1933)
- 1861 – Bhikaiji Cama, Indian activist (died 1936)
- 1870 – Georges Claude, French chemist and engineer, invented Neon lighting (died 1960)
- 1871 – Lottie Dod, English tennis player, golfer, and archer (died 1960)
- 1872 – Jaan Teemant, Estonian lawyer and politician, 7th State Elder of Estonia (died 1941)
- 1873 – María de las Mercedes Adam de Aróstegui, Cuban pianist and composer (died 1957)
- 1878 – Charles-Ferdinand Ramuz, Swiss author and poet (died 1947)
- 1880 – Sarah Knauss, American super-centenarian, oldest verified American person ever (died 1999)
- 1882 – Max Decugis, French tennis player (died 1978)
- 1883 – Franklin Clarence Mars, American businessman, founded Mars, Incorporated (died 1934)
- 1883 – Lawson Robertson, Scottish-American high jumper and coach (died 1951)
- 1884 – Gustave Garrigou, French cyclist (died 1963)
- 1884 – İsmet İnönü, Turkish general and politician, 2nd President of Turkey (died 1973)
- 1884 – Hugo Schmeisser, German weapons designer and engineer (died 1953)
- 1885 – Artur Lemba, Estonian pianist, composer, and educator (died 1963)
- 1890 – Mike González, Cuban baseball player, coach, and manager (died 1977)
- 1890 – A. P. Herbert, English author and playwright (died 1971)
- 1892 – Adélard Godbout, Canadian agronomist and politician, 15th Premier of Québec (died 1956)
- 1893 – Blind Lemon Jefferson, American singer-songwriter and guitarist (died 1929)
- 1894 – Tommy Armour, Scottish-American golfer and sportscaster (died 1968)
- 1894 – Billy Bletcher, American actor, singer, and screenwriter (died 1979)
- 1895 – André Frédéric Cournand, French physician and physiologist, Nobel Prize laureate (died 1988)
- 1896 – F. Scott Fitzgerald, American novelist and short story writer (died 1940)
- 1898 – Howard Florey, Australian pharmacologist and pathologist, Nobel Prize laureate (died 1968)
- 1898 – Charlotte Moore Sitterly, American astronomer (died 1990)
- 1899 – William Dobell, Australian painter (died 1970)
- 1899 – Bessie Braddock, British politician (died 1970)
- 1900 – Ham Fisher, American cartoonist (died 1955)

=== 1901–present ===
- 1901 – Alexandra Adler, Austrian neurologist and psychologist (died 2001)
- 1905 – Severo Ochoa, Spanish–American physician and biochemist, Nobel Prize laureate (died 1993)
- 1906 – Leonard Marsh, Canadian sociologist and academic (died 1982)
- 1906 – Józef Nawrot, Polish footballer (died 1982)
- 1907 – Ben Oakland, American pianist, composer, and songwriter (died 1979)
- 1909 – Gerard Antoni Ciołek, Polish historian and architect (died 1966)
- 1910 – Jean Servais, Belgian-French actor (died 1976)
- 1911 – Konstantin Chernenko, Soviet politician, General Secretary of the Communist Party and de facto leader of the USSR (died 1985)
- 1912 – Robert Lewis Taylor, American author (died 1998)
- 1913 – Herb Jeffries, American singer (died 2014)
- 1914 – Esther Eng, Chinese-American film director (died 1970)
- 1914 – John Kerr, Australian politician, 18th Governor-General of Australia (died 1991)
- 1914 – Andrzej Panufnik, Polish pianist, composer, and conductor (died 1991)
- 1916 – Ruth Leach Amonette, American businesswoman and author (died 2004)
- 1918 – Michael J. S. Dewar, Indian-born American theoretical chemist who developed the Dewar–Chatt–Duncanson model (died 1997)
- 1918 – Audra Lindley, American actress (died 1997)
- 1920 – Richard Bong, American soldier and pilot, Medal of Honor recipient (died 1945)
- 1920 – Jan Carew, Guyanese-American author, poet, and playwright (died 2012)
- 1920 – Ovadia Yosef, Iraqi-Israeli rabbi and scholar (died 2013)
- 1921 – Jim McKay, American sportscaster and journalist (died 2008)
- 1921 – Sheila MacRae, English-American actress, singer, and dancer (died 2014)
- 1922 – Ettore Bastianini, Italian actor and singer (died 1967)
- 1922 – Bert I. Gordon, American director, producer, and screenwriter (died 2023)
- 1922 – Theresa Merritt, American actress and singer (died 1998)
- 1922 – John Moffatt, English actor and playwright (died 2012)
- 1923 – Louis Edmonds, American actor (died 2001)
- 1923 – Fats Navarro, American trumpet player and composer (died 1950)
- 1923 – Raoul Bott, Hungarian-American mathematician (died 2005)
- 1924 – Nina Bocharova, Ukrainian gymnast (died 2020)
- 1924 – Voula Zouboulaki, Egyptian-Greek actress (died 2015)
- 1925 – Autar Singh Paintal, Indian physiologist and academic (died 2004)
- 1927 – Arthur Malet, English-American actor and singer (died 2013)
- 1929 – John Carter, American clarinet player, saxophonist, and flute player (died 1991)
- 1930 – Jack Gaughan, American illustrator (died 1985)
- 1930 – Józef Krupiński, Polish poet and author (died 1998)
- 1930 – Angelo Muscat, Maltese-English actor (died 1977)
- 1930 – Benjamin Romualdez, Filipino politician and diplomat (died 2012)
- 1930 – John W. Young, American captain, engineer, and astronaut (died 2018)
- 1931 – Elizabeth Blackadder, Scottish painter and printmaker (died 2021)
- 1931 – Cardiss Collins, American lawyer and politician (died 2013)
- 1931 – Brian Glanville, English journalist and author (died 2025)
- 1931 – Anthony Newley, English singer and actor (died 1999)
- 1931 – Mike Parkes, English race car driver (died 1977)
- 1932 – Miguel Montuori, Argentinian-Italian footballer and manager (died 1998)
- 1932 – Walter Wallmann, German politician, Minister-President of Hesse (died 2013)
- 1933 – Raffaele Farina, Italian cardinal
- 1933 – Mel Taylor, American drummer (died 1996)
- 1934 – Tommy Anderson, Scottish footballer and manager (died 2018)
- 1934 – John Brunner, English-Scottish author and screenwriter (died 1995)
- 1934 – John Kasmin, English art dealer
- 1934 – Bernard Nevill, English painter, designer, and academic (died 2019)
- 1934 – Chick Willis, American singer and guitarist (died 2013)
- 1934 – Manfred Wörner, German politician and diplomat, 7th Secretary General of NATO (died 1994)
- 1934 – Donald Wrye, American director, screenwriter, and producer (died 2015)
- 1936 – Sivanthi Adithan, Indian businessman (died 2013)
- 1936 – Jim Henson, American puppeteer, director, producer, and screenwriter, created The Muppets (died 1990)
- 1938 – Steve Douglas, American saxophonist, flute player, and producer (died 1993)
- 1939 – Wayne Henderson, American trombonist and producer (died 2014)
- 1939 – Moti Kirschenbaum, Israeli journalist (died 2015)
- 1939 – Jacques Vallée, French ufologist
- 1940 – Yves Navarre, French author (died 1994)
- 1941 – John Mackey, American football player (died 2011)
- 1941 – Linda McCartney, American singer, photographer, and activist (died 1998)
- 1942 – Gerry Marsden, English singer-songwriter and guitarist (died 2021)
- 1944 – Eavan Boland, Irish poet and academic (died 2020)
- 1944 – Sven-Ole Thorsen, Danish bodybuilder and stuntman
- 1944 – Victoria Vetri, Playboy's 1967 Miss September and 1968 Playmate of the Year.
- 1945 – Lou Dobbs, American journalist and author (died 2024)
- 1945 – Carson Van Osten, American comics creator and musician (died 2015)
- 1945 – John Rutter, English composer, conductor, and producer
- 1946 – Jerry Donahue, American guitarist and producer
- 1946 – Joe Greene, American football player, coach, and actor
- 1946 – Lars Emil Johansen, Greenlandic educator and politician, 2nd Prime Minister of Greenland
- 1946 – César Pedroso, Cuban pianist and songwriter (died 2022)
- 1946 – Pat Pocock, Welsh-English cricketer
- 1946 – María Teresa Ruiz, Chilean astronomer
- 1947 – Stephen Mueller, American painter (died 2011)
- 1948 – Gordon Clapp, American actor
- 1948 – Phil Hartman, Canadian-American actor and screenwriter (died 1998)
- 1948 – Garth Porter, New Zealand-Australian singer-songwriter and producer
- 1949 – Baleka Mbete, South African politician, Speaker of the National Assembly of South Africa
- 1949 – Anders Arborelius, Swedish cardinal
- 1950 – Mohinder Amarnath, Indian cricketer, coach, and sportscaster
- 1950 – John Kessel, American author, poet, and playwright
- 1950 – Harriet Walter, English actress
- 1951 – Douglas Kmiec, American scholar and diplomat, United States Ambassador to Malta
- 1952 – Dieter Hochheimer, German footballer and manager
- 1952 – Mark Sandman, American singer-songwriter, guitarist, and producer (died 1999)
- 1954 – Ashton B. Carter, American military civilian official (Secretary of Defense, 2015–17), and academic administrator
- 1954 – Marco Tardelli, Italian footballer and coach
- 1955 – Riccardo Illy, Italian businessman and politician, President of Friuli Venezia Giulia
- 1956 – Hubie Brooks, American baseball player
- 1957 – Wolfgang Wolf, German footballer and manager
- 1958 – Kevin Sorbo, American actor and producer
- 1959 – Theo Paphitis, Cypriot-English businessman
- 1959 – Steve Whitmire, American puppeteer
- 1960 – Amy Sky, Canadian singer-songwriter, producer, and actress
- 1961 – Christopher L. Eisgruber, American lawyer and academic
- 1961 – John Logan, American screenwriter and producer
- 1961 – Luc Picard, Canadian actor, director, and screenwriter
- 1962 – Ally McCoist, Scottish footballer and manager
- 1962 – Mike Phelan, English footballer, coach, and manager
- 1962 – Tim Supple, English director and producer
- 1962 – Nia Vardalos, Canadian-American actress and screenwriter
- 1962 – Ilgvars Zalāns, Latvian painter
- 1963 – Michael Potter, Australian rugby player and coach
- 1963 – Ben Preston, English journalist
- 1964 – Rafael Palmeiro, Cuban-American baseball player
- 1964 – Marko Pomerants, Estonian lawyer and politician, Estonian Minister of the Interior
- 1964 – Ronald van der Kemp, Dutch fashion designer
- 1965 – Robert Irvine, English chef and television host
- 1965 – Njål Ølnes, Norwegian saxophonist and composer
- 1965 – Sean McNabb, American singer and bass player
- 1965 – Janet Weiss, American drummer
- 1966 – Christophe Bouchut, French race car driver
- 1966 – Rajesh Khattar, Indian voice actor
- 1966 – Bernard Gilkey, American baseball player
- 1966 – Stefan Molyneux, Irish-Canadian philosopher, author, and blogger
- 1966 – Michael O. Varhola, American journalist and author
- 1967 – Noreena Hertz, English economist, author, and academic
- 1969 – Shawn Crahan, American drummer, songwriter, and producer
- 1969 – Christopher Pincher, English politician
- 1969 – Shamim Sarif, English author, director, and screenwriter
- 1969 – Paul Ray Smith, American sergeant, Medal of Honor recipient (died 2003)
- 1969 – Megan Ward, American actress
- 1970 – Mario Cristobal, American college football coach
- 1970 – Marc Guggenheim, American screenwriter, television producer, comic book writer, and novelist
- 1971 – Michael S. Engel, American paleontologist and entomologist
- 1971 – Mike Michalowicz, American businessman and author
- 1971 – Kevin Millar, American baseball player and sportscaster
- 1971 – Peter Salisbury, English drummer
- 1972 – Conor Burns, British politician
- 1972 – Kate Fleetwood, English actress
- 1973 – Eddie George, American football player and sportscaster
- 1973 – Gillian Lindsay, Scottish rower
- 1973 – Rodrick Rhodes, American basketball player and coach
- 1974 – John McDonald, American baseball player
- 1976 – Carlos Almeida, Angolan basketball player
- 1976 – Ian Bohen, American actor
- 1976 – Stephanie McMahon, American wrestler and businesswoman
- 1976 – Yakkun Sakurazuka, Japanese voice actor and singer (died 2013)
- 1976 – Vahur Vahtramäe, Estonian footballer
- 1977 – Frank Fahrenhorst, German footballer and manager
- 1977 – Kabeer Gbaja-Biamila, American football player
- 1977 – Casey Rabach, American football player
- 1978 – Wietse van Alten, Dutch archer
- 1979 – Fábio Aurélio, Brazilian footballer
- 1979 – Kim Jong-min, South Korean singer
- 1980 – Daniele Bennati, Italian cyclist
- 1980 – Dean Canto, Australian race car driver
- 1980 – Petri Pasanen, Finnish footballer
- 1980 – Victoria Pendleton, English cyclist
- 1980 – John Arne Riise, Norwegian footballer
- 1981 – Ryan Briscoe, Australian race car driver
- 1981 – Drew Gooden, American basketball player
- 1982 – Morgan Hamm, American gymnast
- 1982 – Paul Hamm, American gymnast
- 1982 – Jeff Karstens, American baseball player
- 1983 – Liam Finn, Australian-New Zealand singer-songwriter and guitarist
- 1983 – Randy Foye, American basketball player
- 1983 – Ben Harris, Australian rugby league player
- 1984 – Bobby Brown, American basketball player
- 1985 – Jonathan Soriano, Spanish footballer
- 1986 – Max Lercher, Austrian politician
- 1986 – Eloise Mumford, American actress
- 1987 – Spencer Treat Clark, American actor
- 1987 – Matthew Connolly, English footballer
- 1987 – Grey Damon, American actor
- 1988 – Karl Alzner, Canadian ice hockey player
- 1988 – Steven Kampfer, American ice hockey player
- 1988 – Kyle Sullivan, American actor
- 1989 – Pia Wurtzbach, Filipina actress, model, and beauty queen, Miss Universe 2015
- 1990 – Vontaze Burfict, American football player
- 1991 – Oriol Romeu, Spanish footballer
- 1993 – Cemre Gümeli, Turkish actress
- 1993 – Narelle Kheng, Singaporean singer, actress, and former national swimmer
- 1993 – Kateryna Derun, Ukrainian athlete
- 1993 – Liu Shiying, Chinese athlete
- 1993 – Jenna Blasman, Canadian snowboarder
- 1993 – Sonya Deville, American athlete
- 1993 – Ben Platt, American actor, singer, and songwriter
- 1997 – Tosin Adarabioyo, English footballer
- 1998 – Nikolas Cruz, American mass murderer
- 2002 – Gaeul, South Korean singer, rapper, and dancer
- 2003 – Joe Locke, Manx actor

== Deaths ==
=== Pre-1600 ===
- 366 – Pope Liberius
- 768 – Pepin the Short, Frankish king (born 714)
- 887 – Gao Pian, general of the Tang Dynasty (born 821)
- 1054 – Hermann of Reichenau, German composer, mathematician, and astronomer (born 1013)
- 1120 – Welf II, Duke of Bavaria (born 1072)
- 1143 – Agnes of Germany (born 1072)
- 1143 – Pope Innocent II
- 1180 – Manuel I Komnenos, Byzantine emperor (born 1118)
- 1218 – Robert of Knaresborough (born 1160)
- 1228 – Stefan the First-Crowned, Serbian king (born 1165)
- 1270 – Philip of Montfort, Lord of Castres
- 1275 – Humphrey de Bohun, 2nd Earl of Hereford, English politician, Lord High Constable of England (born 1208)
- 1435 – Isabeau of Bavaria (born 1370)
- 1459 – Eric of Pomerania, King of Norway, Denmark and Sweden (born 1382)
- 1494 – Poliziano, Italian poet and scholar (born 1454)
- 1534 – Michael Glinski, Lithuanian prince (born c. 1470)
- 1541 – Paracelsus, German-Swiss physician, botanist, and chemist (born 1493)
- 1545 – Albert of Mainz, German cardinal (born 1490)
- 1562 – Henry Grey, 4th Earl of Kent, English politician (born 1495)
- 1572 – Túpac Amaru, last of the Incas

=== 1601–1900 ===
- 1605 – Manuel Mendes, Portuguese composer and educator (born 1547)
- 1621 – Jan Karol Chodkiewicz, Polish commander (born 1560)
- 1646 – Duarte Lobo, Portuguese composer and educator (born 1565)
- 1655 – Frederick, Landgrave of Hesse-Eschwege (born 1617)
- 1707 – Vincenzo da Filicaja, Italian poet and author (born 1642)
- 1732 – Emperor Reigen of Japan (born 1654)
- 1742 – Johann Matthias Hase, German mathematician, astronomer, and cartographer (born 1684)
- 1790 – John Keyse Sherwin, English engraver (born 1751)
- 1798 – Bartholomew Teeling, leader of the United Irishmen executed during the Irish Rebellion of 1798 (born c. 1774)
- 1802 – Alexander Radishchev, Russian author and critic (born 1749)
- 1834 – Pedro I of Brazil (born 1798)
- 1848 – Branwell Brontë, English painter and poet (born 1817)
- 1863 – William Debenham, English businessman, founded Debenhams (born 1794)
- 1889 – D. H. Hill, American general and academic (born 1821)
- 1889 – Charles Leroux, American balloonist and skydiver (born 1856)
- 1892 – Patrick Gilmore, Irish-American soldier and composer (born 1829)
- 1896 – Louis Gerhard De Geer, Swedish lawyer and politician, 1st Prime Minister of Sweden (born 1818)

=== 1901–present ===
- 1904 – Niels Ryberg Finsen, Faroese-Danish physician and author, Nobel Prize laureate (born 1860)
- 1929 – Mahidol Adulyadej, Thai prince (born 1892)
- 1930 – William A. MacCorkle, American lawyer and politician, 9th Governor of West Virginia (born 1857)
- 1933 – Mike Donlin, American baseball player and actor (born 1878)
- 1933 – Alice Muriel Williamson, English author (born 1869)
- 1936 – József Klekl, Slovene priest and journalist (born 1879)
- 1938 – Lev Schnirelmann, Belarusian-Russian mathematician and academic (born 1900)
- 1939 – Carl Laemmle, German-American film producer, founded Universal Studios (born 1867)
- 1939 – Charles Tatham, American fencer (born 1854)
- 1945 – Hans Geiger, German physicist and academic, co-invented the Geiger counter (born 1882)
- 1947 – Andrew C. McLaughlin, American historian and author (born 1861)
- 1948 – Warren William, American actor (born 1894)
- 1950 – Princess Victoria of Hesse and by Rhine (born 1863)
- 1962 – Charles Reisner, American actor, director, and screenwriter (born 1887)
- 1973 – August Kippasto, Estonian-Australian wrestler and poet (born 1887)
- 1973 – Josué de Castro, Brazilian physician, geographer, and activist (born 1908)
- 1975 – Earle Cabell, American businessman and politician, Mayor of Dallas (born 1906)
- 1976 – Philip Gbeho, Ghanaian composer and educator (born 1904)
- 1978 – James Bassett, American journalist and author (born 1912)
- 1978 – Ida Noddack, German chemist and physicist (born 1896)
- 1978 – Hasso von Manteuffel, German general and politician (born 1897)
- 1980 – Theodor Luts, Estonian-Brazilian director, producer, and cinematographer (born 1896)
- 1981 – Patsy Kelly, American actress and dancer (born 1910)
- 1982 – Sarah Churchill, English actress (born 1914)
- 1982 – Józef Nawrot, Polish-English footballer (born 1906)
- 1984 – Neil Hamilton, American actor (born 1899)
- 1991 – Dr. Seuss, American children's book writer, poet, and illustrator (born 1904)
- 1993 – Ian Stuart Donaldson, English singer-songwriter and guitarist (born 1957)
- 1993 – Bruno Pontecorvo, Italian physicist and academic (born 1913)
- 1994 – Barry Bishop, American mountaineer, photographer, and scholar (born 1932)
- 1996 – Zeki Müren, Turkish singer-songwriter (born 1931)
- 1998 – Jeff Moss, American composer and screenwriter (born 1942)
- 2002 – Youssouf Togoïmi, Chadian politician (born 1953)
- 2002 – Mike Webster, American football player (born 1952)
- 2003 – Rosalie Allen, American singer and radio host (born 1924)
- 2003 – Lyle Bettger, American actor (born 1915)
- 2004 – Françoise Sagan, French author and screenwriter (born 1935)
- 2006 – Michael Ferguson, PIRA volunteer, lawyer, and politician (born 1953)
- 2006 – Phil Latulippe, Canadian soldier and runner (born 1909)
- 2008 – Oliver Crawford, American screenwriter and author (born 1917)
- 2008 – Irene Dailey, American actress (born 1920)
- 2008 – Mickey Vernon, American baseball player and coach (born 1918)
- 2009 – Nelly Arcan, Canadian author (born 1975)
- 2010 – Gennady Yanayev, Russian engineer and politician, Vice President of the Soviet Union (born 1937)
- 2012 – Pierre Adam, French cyclist (born 1924)
- 2012 – Bruno Bobak, Polish-Canadian painter and educator (born 1923)
- 2012 – Pedro Vázquez Colmenares, Mexican lawyer and politician, Governor of Oaxaca (born 1934)
- 2013 – Paul Dietzel, American football player and coach (born 1924)
- 2013 – Margaret Feilman, Australian architect and urban planner (born 1921)
- 2013 – Boris Karvasarsky, Ukrainian-Russian psychiatrist and author (born 1931)
- 2013 – Anthony Lawrence, English-Hong Kong journalist and author (born 1912)
- 2013 – Sagadat Nurmagambetov, Kazakh general and politician (born 1924)
- 2013 – Paul Oliver, American football player (born 1984)
- 2014 – Deborah Cavendish, Duchess of Devonshire, English aristocrat, socialite, and author (born 1920)
- 2014 – Christopher Hogwood, English harpsichord player and conductor, founded the Academy of Ancient Music (born 1941)
- 2014 – Madis Kõiv, Estonian physicist, philosopher, and author (born 1929)
- 2015 – Alan Moore, Australian painter and educator (born 1914)
- 2015 – Wang Zhongshu, Chinese archaeologist and academic (born 1925)
- 2016 – Mel Charles, Welsh footballer (born 1935)
- 2016 – Bill Mollison, Australian researcher, author and biologist (born 1928)
- 2016 – Bill Nunn, American actor (born 1953)
- 2016 – Buckwheat Zydeco, American accordionist and bandleader (born 1947)
- 2020 – Dean Jones, Australian cricketer, coach and commentator (born 1961)
- 2022 – Pharoah Sanders, American jazz saxophonist (born 1940)
- 2025 – Sara Jane Moore, American attempted assassin of Gerald Ford (born 1930)
- 2026 – Milan Panić, Serbian businessman and politician, 1st Prime Minister of FR Yugoslavia (born 1929)

== Holidays and observances ==
- Armed Forces Day (Peru)
- Christian feast day:
  - Anathalon (in Brescia)
  - Antonio Gonzalez
  - Blessed Anton Martin Slomšek
  - Bystrík
  - Blessed Colomba Gabriel
  - Blessed Émilie Gamelin (Canada)
  - Gerard of Csanád
  - Our Lady of Mercy and its related observance:
    - La Mercè (Barcelona)
  - Our Lady of Ransom (Mercedarians)
  - Our Lady of Walsingham (Church of England)
  - Pacificus of San Severino
  - Rupert of Salzburg
  - Blessed William Spenser
  - September 24 (Eastern Orthodox liturgics).
- Constitution Day (Cambodia)
- Heritage Day (South Africa)
- Independence Day, celebrates the independence of Guinea-Bissau from Portugal in 1973.
- Mahidol Day (Thailand)
- New Caledonia Day (New Caledonia)
- Republic Day (Trinidad and Tobago)
