= The Mountain (2012 film) =

- Theatrical Release Poster
- Directed by: Alper Çağlar
- Produced by: Alper Çağlar; Mars Entertainment Group; Onur Aydin
- Starring: Çağlar Ertuğrul; Ufuk Bayraktar; Fırat Doğruloğlu; Mesut Akusta; Cengiz Coşkun; Gözde Mutluer; İpek Bağrıaçık; Ali Aksöz
- Cinematography: Mehmet Başaran
- Edited by: Alper Chaglar
- Production company: Caglar Arts Entertainment
- Distributed by: Pinema
- Release date: November 16, 2012
- Running time: 90 minutes
- Country: Turkey
- Language: Turkish
- Budget: ₺170,000
- Box office: ₺3,008,601

The Mountain (Turkish: Dağ), also known as Forgotten Soldiers, is a 2012 Turkish drama film directed by Alper Çağlar.

The film tells a fictional story in which a duty team sent from a troop to repair a field antenna suddenly falls into an ambush. One short and one long term soldier, the only ones to survive, finally put an end to the war between themselves and join hands for the struggle against the real enemy, carrying only two rifles, four magazines, a broken antenna and their survival instincts. The mountain is a heroic tale of two young soldiers who discover brotherhood and fortitude.

== Plot ==
Oğuz from Istanbul, despite having a legal right and money to pay for a shorter period of military service, chooses to do it for a longer time no matter what rest of the people around him do. One week before he is discharged, he finds himself in such a danger to test his courage.

Bekir, who wrangles constantly with Oğuz, has been a long term soldier. He gets on well with neither his commanders, nor his term friends. He has two additional years to be discharged because of his rebellious actions. However, Bekir has pure and unconcerned courage; to be side by side and shoulder to shoulder with Oğuz against the ambush will be a hard test even for him. Having put aside their past animosity just before the raid, they will force limits of bravery in the hardest conditions, and fight together against terrorism in an isolated, freezing and wild area.

== Cast ==
- Çağlar Ertuğrul - Oğuz
- Ufuk Bayraktar - Bekir
- Fırat Doğruloğlu - Lieutenant Yaşar Demir
- Mesut Akusta - Staff Sergeant Kemal Karadağ
- Cengiz Coşkun - First Lieutenant Tuğrul Tümen
- Gözde Mutluer - Pelin
- İpek Bağrıaçık - Defne
- Ali Aksöz - Selçuk
- Özgürcan Çevik - Sülo

== Production ==
A small team made the film working in difficult conditions, with temperatures as low as -15 °C and snow covered meters high, facing snowstorms in one of the peaks of Palandöken and Konaklı, Erzurum. Shooting began in March.

== Sequel ==
A sequel, The Mountain 2, was released in 2016.

== See also ==
- 2012 in film
- Turkish films of 2012
