= Mesut Akusta =

Turkish actor

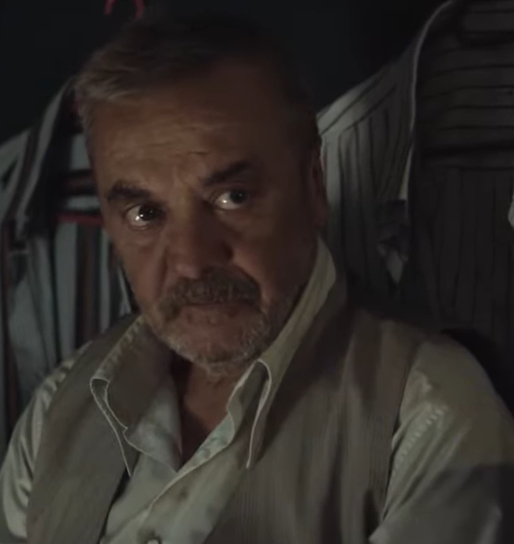
- Born: 22 February 1964 (age 62); Konya, Turkey
- Occupation: Actor
- Years active: 1992–present
- Spouse: Şafak Özbir
- Children: 1

Mesut Akusta (born 22 February 1964) is a Turkish actor.

Akusta was born in Konya. He finished elementary school there. Upon his father's retirement, the family moved to Ayfon and in 1976 he started secondary school. After his father's death, he moved with his family to Ankara in 1985. After passing the university entrance exam, Akusta won a place in the school of literature and arts. He started his career by appearing in plays for children. In 1992, he joined the cast of Yeditepe Hadi Çaman Theatre. In 1997, he appeared in an adaptation of Nezihe Araz's play Cahide. He also appeared in a number of musicals, including Fehim Paşa Konağı, Atları da Vurdular and Şerefe Yirminci Yüzyıl.

Akusta made his cinematic debut with Yanlış Saksının Çiçeği. He also pursued a career on television, most notably appearing in a leading role on the 2013 drama series Karagül alongside Kara Melek's co-star Ece Uslu. He played in mini series and sequel film Börü. He continued his career by taking part in the movies Herşey Çok Güzel Olacak, Eylül Fırtınası, and Filler ve Çimen before appearing in the 2019 drama movie 7. Koğuştaki Mucize, which was critically praised.

== Filmography ==
Television
| Year | Title | Role | Notes |
|---|---|---|---|
| 1993 | Son Söz Sevginin | | |
| 1993 | Yanlış Adres | Ercan | TV film |
| 1993 | Şen Olasın Nuri Bey | | |
| 1996 | Ustura Kemal | İkikafa Niko | |
| 1997 | Kara Melek | Hidayet | |
| 1997 | Yanlış Saksının Çiçeği | | TV film |
| 1997 | Nice Yıllardan Sonra | Haldun | |
| 1997 | Yasemin | | |
| 1998 | Affet Bizi Hocam | Physical educator | |
| 1998 | Kanal Yumuşak G | Bekir | |
| 1998 | Deli Yürek | Burhan | |
| 1999 | Çatısız Kadınlar | | |
| 2000 | Paşa Baba Konağı | Hüdai | |
| 2001 | Güz Gülleri | | |
| 2001 | Benimle Evlenir misin? | Erkan | |
| 2002 | En Son Babalar Duyar | Deli Muzo | |
| 2003–2005 | Kurşun Yarası | Rıza | |
| 2004–2005 | Çocuklar Ne Olacak | Oktay | |
| 2006–2007 | Karagümrük Yanıyor | Gafur | |
| 2007 | Sessiz Fırtına | Barut Demirci | |
| 2008 | İpsiz Recep | Şerif | |
| 2009 | Ah Kalbim | Selim | |
| 2009–2011 | Kurtlar Vadisi Pusu | Ünsal Kemal Alnıaçık | 60 episodes (67–126) |
| 2009–2011 | Ezel | Commissioner Serkan | 3 episodes (2–3, 53) |
| 2011 | Ay Tutulması | Şevket | |
| 2013–2016 | Karagül | Kendal Şamverdi | |
| | Köroğlu | Bolu Beyi | |
| 2017 | Ölene Kadar | Tekin Zerdan | |
| 2017 | Yıldızlar Şahidim | Fikret | |
| 2017–2018 | Eşkıya Dünyaya Hükümdar Olmaz | Ekrem Yıldıran | 30 episodes (74–103) |
| 2018 | Börü | İrfan Aladağ | |
| 2019 | Yüzleşme | Battal Torosoğlu | |
| 2020 | Babil | Süleyman Yavuncu | |
| 2021–2022 | Teşkilat | Mete Yücesoy | 40 episodes (1–40) |
| 2022– | Yürek Çıkmazı | Yılmaz Tekin | 1– |
Film
| Year | Title | Role | Notes |
| 1998 | Her Şey Çok Güzel Olacak | Resepsiyonist | |
| 1998 | Güneşe Yolculuk | | |
| 1999 | Eylül Fırtınası | Kahraman | |
| 2000 | Filler ve Çimen | Evil policeman | |
| 2005 | Cenneti Beklerken | Osman | |
| 2005 | 2 Süper Film Birden | Businessman | |
| 2006 | Kiralık Oda | | |
| 2009 | Umut | Turan | |
| 2009 | Kako Si? | Fatih | |
| 2010 | Kardelen | Osman | |
| 2010 | İmge | | Short film |
| 2010 | Divanyolu: Bir Medeniyet Rüyası | Selim III | |
| 2012 | Dağ | Kemal Karadağ | |
| 2013 | Gitme Baba | Harun | |
| 2015 | Kanlı Postal | Esat Oktay Yıldıran | |
| 2015 | Memleket | Seydi | |
| 2018 | Börü | İrfan Aladağ | |
| 2019 | Lady Winsley'i Kim Öldürdü? | İsmail | |
| 2019 | 7. Koğuştaki Mucize | Yusuf | |
| 2023 | Demir Kadın: Neslican | Fahri Tay | |
