= Hande Doğandemir =

Turkish actress, TV host and sociologist (born 1985)

- Born: 22 November 1985 (age 40); Ankara, Turkey
- Education: Ankara University
- Occupations: Actress, TV host and sociologist
- Years active: 2009–present

Hande Doğandemir (born 22 November 1985) is a Turkish actress, TV host and sociologist.

She is best known for her role as Zeynep Yılmaz on Kanal D series Güneşi Beklerken and as Turhan Sultan in Muhteşem Yüzyıl: Kösem. She is also known for her supporting roles as "Elem" in the surreal drama series Şubat, as "Şans" in the surreal comedy series Leyla ile Mecnun and in the film Nuh Tepesi of Tribeca Film Festival.

== Life and career ==
Her maternal family is of Circassian descent. She graduated from Ankara University, Department of Sociology. In her senior year in university, she went to Lille, France, with ERASMUS programme. She speaks French and English fluently. Doğandemir began in production for communication sociology. She simultaneously worked as an actress, editor and host.

She came to attention for her Browni Intense commercial with Nejat İşler. She and Nejat İşler later played together in the film "Kaybedenler Kulübü: Yolda".

She repeatedly played with the same actors. With Alican Yücesoy, she played in Sen de Gitme, Şubat, Can Kırıkları, and Hükümsüz. With Seçkin Özdemir, She played in Racon: Ailem İçin, Can Kırıkları, and Yaren Leylek. With İsmail Hacıoğlu, she played in Hükümsüzler and 49. With Ali Atay, she played in Nuh Tepesi and Leyla ile Mecnun. With Kutsi, She played in Kahramanlar and Annemizi Saklarken.

Doğandemir made her cinematic debut with Bana Masal Anlatma, a film directed and written by Burak Aksak.

Also, she played leading roles alongside İbrahim Çelikkol, Barış Arduç, Şükrü Özyıldız, Engin Öztürk, and Serkan Çayoğlu.

== Filmography ==
Television
Year	Production	Role	Notes	Channel
2009-2010	Kahramanlar	Zeynep Kayhan	Supporting actress	Show TV
2010	Keskin Bıçak	Aslı Karaağaç	Leading actress	FOX
2011-2012	Sen de Gitme	Aslı	Supporting actress	TRT 1
2012	İbret-i Ailem	İpek Şenocak	Supporting actress	Star TV
2012	Böyle Bitmesin	Ceylan Ağalı	Guest actress	TRT 1
2013	Şubat	Elem	Guest actress	TRT 1
2013	Leyla ile Mecnun	Şans	Guest actress	TRT 1
2013-2014	Güneşi Beklerken	Zeynep Yılmaz / Güzel / Sayer	Leading actress	Kanal D
2015	Racon: Ailem İçin	Yağmur / Azra	Leading actress	atv
2016	Hayatımın Aşkı	Gökçe Şenkal	Leading actress	Kanal D
2017	Muhteşem Yüzyıl: Kösem	Hatice Turhan Sultan	Leading actress	FOX
2018	Can Kırıkları	Leyla Akgün / Leyla Doğan	Leading actress	atv
2019	Yüzleşme	Masal Karaca / Gonca Kalenderoğlu	Leading actress	Kanal D
2020	Kırmızı Oda	Nesrin	Guest actress	TV8
2021-2022	Annemizi Saklarken	Handan Güven	Leading actress	Star TV
2022	Hayat Bugün	Derin Nalbantoğlu	Leading actress	Show TV
2024	Taş Kağıt Makas	Güneş Evliyaoğlu	Leading actress	Kanal D
2025-2026	Kiskanmak	Türkan	Supporting actress	NOW
Internet
Year	Production	Role	Notes	Platform
2021	Hükümsüz	Filiz	Leading actress	Exxen
2021	Tolgshow Filtresiz		Guest actress	Exxen
2022	Sadece Arkadaşız	Dilay		Exxen
Coming soon	Kara Kış		Leading actress	tabii
Film
Year	Production	Role	Notes	
2015	Bana Masal Anlatma	Ayperi	Leading actress	
2016	Her Şey Aşktan	Pelin	Leading actress	
2017	Kaybedenler Kulübü Yolda	Sevda	Leading actress	
2018	Nuh Tepesi	Elif	Leading actress	
2019	Gelincik	Sevim	Leading actress	
2023	49	Sahra	Leading actress	
2024	Yaren Leylek	Arzu	Leading actress	
2024	Daha İyi Bir Yarın	Ekin	Leading actress	
2024	Hatırladığım Ağaçlar	Bahar	Leading actress	
2025	Aşk ve Yemek	Mercan	Leading actress	

== Tv host ==
Year	Title	Duration	Role	Notes	Channel
2011–2013	Hatırlar Mısınız?	20 minutes	Herself	TV host-editor	TRT Okul

== Video clips ==
Year	Artists	Video clip
2014	Aylin Zoi	Mecaz
2017	Ersay Üner	İki Aşık

== Theater ==
- Waterproof (2019)
- İçimdeki Yangın (2021-)
- Eksik (2023-)

== Awards and nominations ==
Year	Award	Category	Work	Result
2014	3.Ege University Media Awards	Best Actress	Güneşi Beklerken - Zeynep	Won
2014	3.Kristal Fare Media Awards	Best Actress	Güneşi Beklerken - Zeynep	Nominated
2014	5.Ayaklı Gazete TV Awards	Best Actress	Güneşi Beklerken - Zeynep	Won
