= İlayda Akdoğan =

Turkish actress (born 1998)

- Born: 21 July 1998 (age 27); Istanbul, Turkey
- Occupation: Actress
- Years active: 2004–present

İlayda Akdoğan (born 21 July 1998) is a Turkish actress and YouTuber.

== Life and career ==
İlayda Akdoğan was born on 21 July 1998 in Istanbul. She started her career at the age of six in 2004 when she appeared in a children show titled En İyi Arkadaşım and portrayed the character of Seda. In 2005, she appeared in the series Afacanlar Kampı. In 2007, she was cast in the series Bez Bebek and portrayed the character of Gülay. In the same year she made an appearance in the series Sevgili Dünürüm. In 2015, she made her cinematic debut with the movie Mustang and depicted the character of Sonay. In 2016, she made appearances in two series. Firstly, she appeared in Oyunbozan, playing the character of Eylül. Secondly, she had a main role in FOX TV Series Umuda Kelepçe Vurulmaz and depicted the character of Elif. In 2017, she made her debut in the summer series Dolunay and depicted the character of Asuman, a mischievous and rebellious girl. The show starred Can Yaman and Özge Gürel as the leading characters.

She has also a YouTube channel, by the name İlayda Akdoğan. She has 180K subscribers as of August 2021.

== Personal life ==
Akdoğan was in a relationship with Iranian basketball player Roham Kabir. In 2020, she travelled to Tehran, Iran to meet him, but got stranded there due to the cancellation of flights during the COVID-19 pandemic. However, she returned to Istanbul four months later on 29 June 2020. Fans started speculating the couple had ended their six-year long relationship as there were no more social media updates of the two together since November 2024, and Akdoğan had removed photos of Kabir from her Instagram profile. In January 2025, İlayda confirmed the rumours on her Instagram group channel.

== Filmography ==
Film
Year	Title	Role
2015	Mustang	Sonay
2020	Masallardan Geriye Kalan	Hece
Television
Year	Title	Role
2004	En İyi Arkadaşım	Seda
2005	Afacanlar Kampı	
2007	Sevgili Dünürüm	
2007	Bez Bebek	Gülay
2016	Oyunbozan	Eylül
2016–2017	Umuda Kelepçe Vurulmaz	Elif
2017	Dolunay	Asuman Pınar
2024-2025	Yabani	Derin
Streaming series and films
Year	Title	Role
2020	Rise of Empires: Ottoman	Therma Sphrantzes
2022	Ben Gri	Ceyda
2023	İyi Adamın 10 Günü	Hatice / Pınar
2023	Kötü Adamın 10 Günü	Hatice / Pınar
2024	Meraklı Adamın 10 Günü	Hatice / Pınar
