= Merih Öztürk =

Turkish actress and model (born 1999)

- Born: 28 December 1999 (age 26); Düzce, Turkey
- Education: Kocaeli University - Faculty of Sports Sciences; Anadolu University - Radio, Television and Cinema
- Occupation: Actress
- Years active: 2016–present
- Awards: Best Model of Turkey third place

Merih Öztürk (born 28 December 1999) is a Turkish actress and model. She was the third-place winner of Best Model of Turkey in 2018.

== Life and career ==
She was born on 28 December 1999 in Düzce, the daughter of a father from Düzce who was Abkhazian and a mother from Arhavi. She became interested in acting from the age of 6 and appeared as a child actress by participating in television programs.

She was selected as Turkey's third-place winner at the 2018 Best Model of Turkey competition at the age of 18. She subsequently played the character Güney in the science fiction series Börü 2039, produced by Alper Çağlar and broadcast on BluTV. Later, between 2022 and 2023, she gained recognition by taking on the role of Jovanka, her first leading role, in the series Balkan Ninnisi, directed by Selahattin Sancaklı and Serdar Akar and broadcast on TRT 1. In 2023, she appeared alongside Boran Kuzum in a commercial for Türkiye Ekonomi Bankası (TEB). In the same year, she played the character Leyla in Başım Belada (2023), broadcast on atv, and in 2024 she played the leading character Gülnaz in the series Kara Ağaç Destanı, broadcast on TRT 1, increasing her popularity.

== Filmography ==
Television
Year	Title	Role	Notes	Network
2008	İki Aile		Supporting role	Star TV
2022–2023	Balkan Ninnisi	Jovanka	Leading role	TRT 1
2023	Başım Belada	Leyla Biçer	Leading role	atv
2024	Kara Ağaç Destanı	Gülnaz	Leading role	TRT 1
2026–	Haysiyet	Simay	Leading role	Kanal D
Streaming films and series
Year	Title	Role	Notes	Platform
2021–2022	Börü 2039	Güney	Supporting role	BluTV
2025	% İki	Beste	Leading role	tabii
Film
Year	Title	Role	Notes	
2007	Son Osmanlı Yandım Ali		Supporting role	

Commercials
Year	Product / Label
2019	Liverpool Victoria
2020	Veet
2020	Molped
2021	Enza Home
2023	TEB Bankası Reklamı

== Awards ==
Year	Organization	Category
2017	Best Model of Turkey	Best Promising (Gelecek Vaat Eden)
2018	Best Model of Turkey	Third place
