= Özlem Conker =

Turkish actress (born 1973)

- Born: 12 May 1973 (age 53); Ankara, Turkey
- Occupation: Actress
- Years active: 1996–present

Özlem Conker (born 12 May 1973 in Ankara) is a Turkish actress.

== Biography ==
Conker was educated at the Training Center for Special Education Care in the Netherlands. She started her acting career in 1996 by playing a supporting role in the Bizim Ev series. She was first noted by the public in 2001 with her role in the TRT series Vasiyet. She is best known for her roles in the period drama Payitaht: Abdülhamid, Kınalı Kar, and the series Karagül. With Okan Yalabık, she played in romantic comedies "Çapkın" and "Sensiz Olmuyor".

== Filmography ==
Year	Title	Role	Type	Notes
1996	Seninle Olmak Var Ya	-	Music video	Metin Özülkü's song
1996	Bizim Ev	Neslihan	TV series	Supporting role
2000	Mert Ali	Pervin	TV series	Supporting role
2000	Kurşun Kalem	-	TV series	Supporting role
2001	Aynalı Tahir	Leyla	TV series	Supporting role
2001	Bıçak Sırtı	-	TV series	Supporting role
2002	Vasiyet	Zeliha	TV series	Leading role
2002	Derya & Deniz	Derya	TV series	Leading role
2002–2004	Kınalı Kar	Nazar Beyoğlu	TV series	Leading role
2005	Sensiz olmuyor	Gönül	TV series	Leading role
2005	Çapkın	Alev	TV series	Leading role
2006	Rüyalarda Buluşuruz	Sinem	TV series	Supporting role
2007	Eksik Etek	Deniz	TV series	Leading role
2007	Oğlum İçin	Bahar	TV series	Supporting role
2009	Ömre Bedel	İlknur	TV series	Guest appearance
2009–2010	Bahar Dalları	Ece	TV series	Leading role
2011	Aşk ve Ceza	Ceyda	TV series	Supporting role
2011	Canan	Canan Özyılmaz	TV series	Leading role
2013–2016	Karagül	Narin Mercan	TV series	Supporting role
2017–2021	Payitaht: Abdülhamid	Bidar Kadın	TV series	Leading role
2026–present	Sevdiğim Sensin	Fatoş Parsioğlu	TV series	Supporting role
