= Cengiz Coşkun =

Turkish actor and model

- Cengiz Coşkun
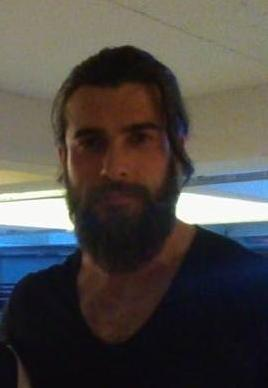
- Cengiz Coşkun in 2016
- Born: 29 April 1982 (age 44); Istanbul, Turkey
- Education: Marmara University Graduated in sports management
- Occupations: Actor, model, Basketball player
- Years active: 2002–present
- Known for: Diriliş: Ertuğrul
- Style: Action, Drama
- Height: 1.85 m (6 ft 1 in)
- Title: Diriliş: Ertuğrul
- Term: 2014–2019
- Spouse: Beatrice Lorena (m. 2022)

Cengiz Coşkun (born 29 April 1982) is a Turkish television and film actor. He is best known for his role as Turgut Alp in the TV show Diriliş: Ertuğrul.

== Early life ==
Coşkun was born on 29 April 1982 in Istanbul. His mother is a housewife and his father is a machine technician, they were ethnic Turks from Bulgaria who immigrated to Turkey.

== Career ==
He started playing basketball in the first years of secondary school, and then won Ülkerspor's auditions. He played there for 7 years, then transferred to Erdemir Ereğli Spor where he remained for 2 years. Then he played for 1 year at Balıkesir DSİ Spor. In 2008, he graduated from Marmara University, sports department.

During this time he also started modelling. Coşkun began his appearing and modelling profession after successful a modelling contest in 2002, which was held in London. In 2005, he started acting with the series Rüzgarlı Bahçe. After starting acting, he got training from Şahika Tekand and joined her workshops. Later, he appeared in the series Candan Öte (2006), Doktorlar (2007) and Hicran Yarası (2009).

Coşkun made his film debut in the Fetih 1453 (2012) and appeared as Giovanni Giustiniani. It is said he did not get the main role as the Sultan as his eyes were blue. He competed in the reality show Survivor: Ünlüler vs. Gönüllüler 3 (2013) and was eliminated on the 94th day. He played the role of Turgut Alp in Diriliş: Ertuğrul (2014). In 2020, Coşkun appeared in film Malazgirt 1071 in lead role of Seljuk Sultan Alp Arslan.

== Filmography ==
=== TV series ===
TV series
Year	Title	Role	Notices
2005	Rüzgarlı Bahçe	Mercan	
2005	Nehir	Umut	
2006	Candan Öte	Kaan Atalay	
2006	Doktorlar	Mert Eriç	
2009	Hicran Yarası	Tarık Budak	
2013	Survivor: Ünlüler vs. Gönüllüler 3	Celebrities – Himself	
2014–2019	Diriliş: Ertuğrul	Turgut Alp	
2025	Kuruluş: Osman	Turgut Alp	

=== Films ===
Key
†	Denotes films that have not yet been released

Films
Year	Title	Role	Notice
2012	Fetih 1453	Giovanni Giustiniani	Debut film
2012	Dağ: The Mountain	First Lieutenant Tuğrul Tümen	
2016	Çekmeceler	Ali	
2022	Malazgirt 1071	Sultan Alp Arslan	
2023	Yavuz: Adaletin Kılıcı †	Yavuz Sultan Selim	Filming
