= Son Ders =

- Directed by: Mustafa Uğur Yağcıoğlu; Iraz Okumuş
- Starring: Ferhan Şensoy; Ece Uslu
- Release date: 8 February 2008
- Running time: 1h 39min
- Country: Turkey
- Language: Turkish

Son Ders ("The Last Lesson") is a 2008 Turkish comedy film directed by Mustafa Uğur Yağcıoğlu and Iraz Okumuş. Saffet Ercan, a university lecturer, returns to his Turkish homeland to continue his career. His students learn details of his secret past.

== Cast ==
- Ferhan Şensoy - Hakan Aymaz / Saffet Ercan
- Ece Uslu - Soley
- Kaan Urgancıoğlu - Ulaş
- Durul Bazan - Cem
- Ekin Türkmen - Deren
- Ege Aydan - Caner
