= Ahu Türkpençe =

Turkish actress

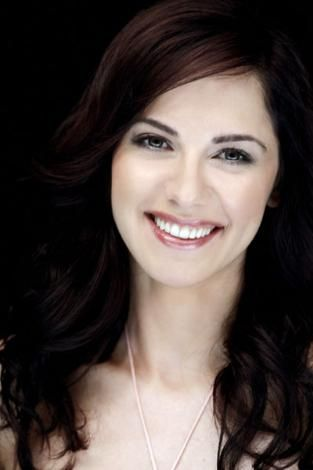
- Born: 2 January 1977 (age 49); Samsun, Turkey
- Occupation: Actress

Ahu Türkpençe (born 2 January 1977) is a Turkish actress.

== Biography ==
Ahu Türkpençe was born in Samsun on the Black Sea coast. Her sister is actress, Gözde Türkpençe. She was interested in theatre and with the help of a close friend, she joined the cast of the Müjdat Gezen Arts Center. Doing do, she put her studies in Physics at Yıldız Technical University on hold.

She had parts in the hit series "Yedi Numara", "Elveda Rumeli", "Behzat Ç." and gained fame for starring in Bir İstanbul Masalı. She played as Asena in military series "Börü" and in spin off sci-fi series "Börü 2039". Türkpençe has also appeared in films such as Kaybedenler Kulübü, Dağ 2, Neredesin Firuze, Keloğlan Kara Prens'e Karşı, Dinle Neyden, Denizden Gelen.

== Filmography ==
=== Web Series ===
Web series
Title	Year	Role
Rumi	2023	
Börü: 2039	2021	Asena Tümer
Börü	2018	Asena Tümer
Behzat Ç.	2019	

=== Tv Series ===
- Gurbetçiler (1996)
- Güzel Günler (1998)
- Bize Ne Oldu (1999)
- Yedi Numara (2000)
- Azad (2002)
- Bir İstanbul Masalı (2003)
- Şöhret (2004)
- Kod Adı (2006)
- Karamel (2008)
- Elveda Rumeli (2009)
- Ateşe Yürümek (2010)
- Tek Başımıza (2011)
- Vicdan (2014)

=== Films ===
- Dağ 2 (2016)
- Köksüz (2013)
- Kaybedenler Kulübü (2011)
- Bekle Beni (2010)
- Sessiz Çocuklar (2010)
- Denizden Gelen (2009)
- Ölü Yaprak Vuruşu (2009)
- Dinle Neyden (2008)
- Hicran Sokağı (2007)
- Keloğlan Kara Prens'e Karşı (2006)
- Asterix Vikinglere Karşı (2006)
- Neredesin Firuze (2003)
