= Hayatımın Aşkı =

Turkish television series

- Hayatımın Aşkı
- Genre: Drama; Romance
- Written by: Gökhan Horzum; Ekin Atalar
- Directed by: Hakan Kırvavaç (Ketche)
- Starring: Hande Doğandemir; Serkan Çayoğlu; Berk Hakman; Zafer Algöz; Zeynep Eronat; Yonca Evcimik; Sadi Celil Cengiz; Seda Türkmen; Deniz Barut; Ayşegül İşsever; Murat Parasayar; Sarp Can Köroğlu; İlay Erkök; Gizem Terzi; Duygu Gök Boztepe; Avni Yalçın; Nazlı Pınar Kaya; Hilal Altınbilek; Özkan Ayalp; Metin Keçeci
- Composers: Batuhan Firat; Yıldıray Gürgen
- Country of origin: Turkey
- Original language: Turkish
- No. of seasons: 1
- No. of episodes: 17

Production
- Producer: Shebnem Askin
- Production locations: Adana and Istanbul (districts of Kanlıca, Üsküdar and Kuleli Emek)
- Running time: 120 minutes
- Production company: Lucky Red Film

Original release
- Network: Kanal D
- Release: May 15 – September 18, 2016

Hayatımın Aşkı is a Turkish romantic drama series that broadcast on Kanal D betweewn May 15 and September, 2016. It is directed by Hakan Kırvavaç, written by Gökhan Horzum and Ekin Atalar, produced by Lucky Red Film and stars Hande Doğandemir and Serkan Çayoğlu.

== Plot ==
Gökçe Şenkal is a single girl who works at the Ajans 237 advertising agency and is worried that all her friends have gotten married or are about to get married and she hasn't. Later, Ella Gökçe meets Demir Cerrahoğlu, the owner of the agency where she works.

== Cast ==
=== Main characters ===
Actor/Actress	Character	Episodes
Hande Doğandemir	Gökçe Şenkal	1–17
Serkan Çayoğlu	Demir Cerrahoğlu	1–17
Berk Hakman	Kaan	1–17
Zafer Algöz	Hikmet Senkal	1–17
Zeynep Eronat	Rezzan Senkal	1–17
Yonca Evcimik	Yonca Evcimik	1–17
Sadi Celil Cengiz	Bartu Senkal	1–17
Seda Türkmen	Sema	1–17
Deniz Barut	Eylem	1–17
Ayşegül İşsever	Nesrin Cerrahoğlu	1–17
Murat Parasayar	Rahmi	1–17
Sarp Can Köroğlu	Hakan	1–17
İlay Erkök	Sezen Senkal	1–17
Gizem Terzi	Nilay	1–17
Duygu Gök Boztepe	Nilüfer	1–17
Avni Yalçın	Hulusi Cerrahoğlu	1–17
Nazlı Pınar Kaya	Duru Cerrahoğlu	1–17
Hilal Altınbilek	Nil	1–17
Özkan Ayalp	Hüseyin	1–17
Metin Keçeci	Mustafa	1–17

=== Secondary characters ===
Actor/Actress	Character	Episodes
Emre Yetim	Emre	12–17
Gökberk Demirci	Adil	7–15
İlker Aksum	Tarık	12–17
Doğan Tank	Dündar	10–17
İlkyaz Kocatepe	Ayça	10–17
Murat Cemcir	Anil	1
Ahmet Kural	Ferda	1
Ayhan Taş	Yarkın	1
Farnaz Mahmoudi	Nurse	16
	Muharrem	
Sedat
Yeliz
Melisa
Nurse Hemşire
Seda
Ahmet

== Episodes ==
Season	Episodes	Originally released	
Season	Episodes	First released	Last released
1	17	May 15, 2016	September 18, 2016

=== Season 1 (2016) ===
n°	Original title	Original air date
1	1. Bölüm	15 May 2016
2	2. Bölüm	22 May 2016
3	3. Bölüm	29 May 2016
4	4. Bölüm	3 June 2016
5	5. Bölüm	10 June 2016
6	6. Bölüm	17 June 2016
7	7. Bölüm	26 June 2016
8	8. Bölüm	7 July 2016
9	9. Bölüm	24 July 2016
10	10. Bölüm	31 July 2016
11	11. Bölüm	5 August 2016
12	12. Bölüm	12 August 2016
13	13. Bölüm	21 August 2016
14	14. Bölüm	28 August 2016
15	15. Bölüm	4 September 2016
16	16. Bölüm	11 September 2016
17	17. Bölüm	18 September 2016

== Production ==
The series is directed by Hakan Kırvavaç, written by Gökhan Horzum and Ekin Atalar and produced by Lucky Red Film.

=== Filming ===
The first episode of the big-budget series was filmed in Adana, while the remaining sixteen episodes were filmed in various neighborhoods of Istanbul, namely Kanlıca, Üsküdar and Kuleli Emek.

== Awards ==
Year	Award	Category	Name yourself	Result
2016	Pantene Golden Butterfly Awards	Best Television Comedy Actress	Hande Doğandemir	Nominated
2017	Pantene Golden Butterfly Awards	Best Actor in a Television Comedy	Serkan Çayoğlu	Nominated
2017	Turkey Youth Awards	Best television actor	Serkan Çayoğlu	Nominated
