= Wolf (miniseries) =

2018 Turkish-language miniseries

- Genre: Crime
- Created by: Alper Caglar
- Starring: Ahu Türkpençe; Serkan Çayoğlu; Emir Benderlioğlu
- Country of origin: Turkey
- Original language: Turkish
- No. of seasons: 1
- No. of episodes: 6

Production
- Production companies: CaglarArts Entertainment; Insignia Productions

Original release
- Network: Star TV
- Release: February 28, 2018

Wolf (Turkish: Börü) is a six-part 2018 Turkish-language miniseries starring Ahu Türkpençe, Serkan Çayoğlu, and Emir Benderlioğlu. The plot revolves around the lives of Turkey's Police Special Operation Teams, covering several years of Turkish history beginning in 2014. It was released on February 28, 2018 on Star TV.

Also, The film Börü released on 28 December 2018. The spin off sci-fi series Börü 2039 was broadcast on BluTv.

== Cast ==
- Ahu Türkpençe as Asena Tümer
- Serkan Çayoğlu as Kaya Ülgen
- Emir Benderlioğlu as Turan Kara
- Murat Arkın as Kemal Boratav
- Fırat Doğruloğlu as Behçet Orbay
- Mesut Akusta as İrfan Aladağ
- Ahmet Pınar as Barbaros Çepni
- Can Nergis as Tolga Erlik
- Ozan Agaç as Baran Harput
- Bedii Akın as Ömer Tunç
- Melis Hacic as Zeynep
- Gürol Tonbul as Turgut Atalay
- Tan Altay as Tan Altay
- Armağan Oğuz as Ayı Murat
- Özge Gürel as First Lieutenant Gökçe Demir

== Release ==
Wolf was released on February 28, 2018 on Star TV.
