= Black Rose (Turkish TV series) =

Television series

- Karagül
- Genre: Drama; Romance
- Written by: Sema Ergenekon; Eylem Canpolat (1); Pınar Uysal; Funda Çetin (2-12); Erkan Birgören; Betül Yağsağan; Beril Köse (13-)
- Directed by: Murat ЙгSaraçoğlu; Günay Günaydın
- Starring: Ece Uslu; Saruhan Hünel; Şerif Sezer; Mesut Akusta; Hilal Altınbilek; Mert Yazıcıoğlu; Ayça Ayşin Turan; İlayda Çevik; Ogün Kaptanoğlu; Hülya Duyar; Özlem Conker; Sebahat Kumaş; Sevda Erginci; Can Atak; Arda Erkuran; Ebru Ojen Şahin; Eser Karabil; Burak Çelik; Turan Selçuk Yerlikaya; Açelya Elmas; Gonca Cilasun; Feyzan Soykan; Su Olgaç
- Theme music composer: Fırat Yükselir
- Opening theme: Karagül Jenerik Müziği
- Ending theme: Karagül Bitiş Müziği
- Country of origin: Turkey
- Original language: Turkish
- No. of seasons: 4
- No. of episodes: 125

Production
- Producer: Şükrü Avşar
- Production locations: Halfeti, Şanlıurfa
- Running time: 2 hours and 15 minutes or 30 minutes
- Production company: Avşar Film

Original release
- Network: Fox Turkey
- Release: March 29, 2013 – June 10, 2016

Karagül (English title: Black Rose) is a Turkish romantic drama series that broadcast on Fox Turkey between March 29, 2013, and June 10, 2016.

== Plot ==
Ebru and Murat have three children. One day the wife, Ebru, receives the news that her husband has disappeared by falling into a river in Halfeti, his hometown. From that moment, her life changes radically. She finds out that her husband has lost all family assets and mortgaged his assets. Ebru moves to Halfeti to find her husband's body. There she is alone and without money, she also discovers that her husband had a first wife. In that place, she will have to deal with Kendal, the family first-born who was always jealous of Murat because he wanted to be the sole heir of the family; however, Kendal does not have a child who can continue with his legacy since the only one he has is disabled. Ebru will also meet Baran, her first child with Murat who was supposedly born dead.

== Cast ==
Actor/Actress	Character
Ece Uslu	Ebru Şamverdi
Saruhan Hünel	Kenan Güner
Mesut Akusta	Kendal-Aga Şamverdi
Yavuz Bingöl	Fırat Mercan
Hilal Altınbilek	Özlem Şamverdi/Hanım
Özcan Deniz	Murat Şamverdi
Şerif Sezer	Kadriye Şamverdi
Özlem Conker	Narin Mercan Şamverdi
Eser Karabil	Kasim Yılmaz Kaharman Karakoyunlu
Sebahat Kumaş	Melek Şamverdi
Yalçın Ertürk	Recep
Mert Yazıcıoğlu	Baran Şamverdi
İlayda Çevik	Maya Şamverdi
Ayça Ayşin Turan	Ada Şamverdi
Arda Erkuran	Rüzgar Şamverdi
Gonca Cilasun	Fikriye Güner
Hülya Duyar	Emine Şamverdi/Reyhan
Ebru Şahin	Sibel Şamverdi
Sevda Erginci	Ayşe Şamverdi/Özalp
Can Atak	Asım Şamverdi
Ogün Kaptanoğlu	Oğuz Kılıçoğlu
Burak Çelik	Serdar Kılıçoğlu
Su Olgaç	Deniz Kılıçoğlu
Bülent Polat	Sabri

== Series overview ==
Season	No. of episodes	Originally broadcast (Turkey)	
Season	No. of episodes	Series premiere	Series finale
1	12	March 29, 2013	June 14, 2013
2	37	September 20, 2013	June 23, 2014
3	39	September 19, 2014	June 12, 2015
4	37	October 2, 2015	June 10, 2016

== International broadcasts ==
Africa

- Egypt - Capital Broadcasting Channel
- Tunisia - Nessma TV

Asia

- Afghanistan - Tolo TV
- Iran - Farsi1 TV
- Iraq - KurdMax
- Pakistan - Urdu 1
- Indonesia - antv
- Malaysia - TV9
- Syria - MBC
- Lebanon - Lebanese Broadcasting Corporation
- China - CCTV
- Singapore - TV3

Europe

- Albania - TV Klan
- Bosnia and Herzegovina - Hayat TV
- Bulgaria - Nova
- Croatia - Nova TV
- Greece - Star Channel
- North Macedonia - Sitel TV
- Montenegro - TV Vijesti
- Romania - Pro TV, Acasă TV
- Serbia - RTV Pink, Pink Soap
- Spain - Divinity
- Ukraine - 1+1
- Georgia - Imedi TV

Latin America

- Chile - Canal 13
- Costa Rica - Repretel
- Peru - Latina Televisión
- Nicaragua - Canal 10
- Pasiones Latin America
