= Kızım Nerede? =

- Based on: ¿Dónde está Elisa? by Pablo Illanes
- Written by: Zehra Güleray; Murat Koca
- Directed by: Ersoy Güler(season 1); Atilla Cengiz (season 2)
- Starring: Ece Uslu; Hüseyin Avni Danyal; Burak Hakkı; Özgül Kavruk; Özge Gürel; Erdi Bolat; Serkan Şenalp; Nihan Balyalı; Yonca Cevher Yenel; Yağmur Kaşifoğlu; Tolga Savacı; Soydan Soydaş; Duygu Sen; Gamze Karaman; Kamil Güler; Pelin Yoru
- Country of origin: Turkey
- Original language: Turkish
- No. of seasons: 2
- No. of episodes: 26

Production
- Producers: Fatih Oflaz; Ahmet Öncül
- Running time: 90 minutes (Episode 1-25); 120 minutes (Episode 26)

Original release
- Network: aTV
- Release: 17 December 2010 – 3 August 2011

Kızım Nerede? ("Where Is My Daughter?") is a Turkish suspense drama TV series that it airs on aTV from December 17, 2010, until August 3, 2011. It is based on the 2009 Chilean telenovela ¿Dónde está Elisa? It stars Ece Uslu, Hüseyin Avni Danyal and Burak Hakkı. It was coproduced by TVN, Telemundo and Medya Vizyon.

The film was distributed in English as Missing.

== Synopsis ==
Zafer Demiray is one of the most renowned businessman in the country. He has a wife, namely Suna, and their three daughters, namely Eylül, Cansu and Zeynep. With his sisters, Ipek and Mine, together with their respective husbands and their children combined in a one big family. Their family company that they built and established has been very successful.

One summer morning, the family celebrated a birthday party because Zafer was chosen as the businessman of the year. He had everything that he could have imagined. After the celebration, Zeynep and her three cousins ask permission to go to a club. The four adolescents are being dropped off by Zafer. At 3 o’clock in the morning, Suna and Ipek went there to pick them up. The party ends and Suna and Ipek found the cousins. But Zeynep was nowhere to be found! The whole family starts to wait in fear. The happy family portrait becomes a nightmare. Where is Zeynep?

== Cast ==
The main characters are:

Actor name	Character	Description
Ece Uslu	Suna Demiray	Zeynep's mother. Zafer's wife.
Hüseyin Avni Danyal	Zafer Demiray	Zeynep's father. One of the most renowned businessman in Turkey.
Burak Hakkı	Kaan	Detective.
Özgül Kavruk	Sedef	Employee of Demiray company.
Özge Gürel	Zeynep Demiray	Zafer and Suna's daughter.
Erdi Bolat	Rüzgar Orhun	Zeynep's cousin. Mine and Kemal's son.
Serkan Şenalp	Emre Arslan	Zeynep's cousin. Ipek and Bahadır's son.
Nihan Balyalı	Hazal Arslan	Zeynep's cousin. Ipek and Bahadır's daughter.
Yonca Cevher Yenel	Ipek Demiray Arslan	Bahadır's wife. Zeynep's aunt. Nihat's girlfriend.
Yağmur Kaşifoğlu	Mine Demiray Orhun	Kemal's wife. Zeynep's aunt.
Kamil Güler	Nihat Yaman	Zafer's friend. Ipek's ex-boyfriend.
Tolga Savacı	Bahadır Arslan	Ipek's husband.
Soydan Soydaş	Kemal Orhun	Mine's husband.
Duygu Sen	Neslihan Pasin	Detective.
Gamze Karaman	Ebru	Mine's closest friend.
Pelin Yoru	Jülide German	Zafer's secretary.
Erman Burmalı	Cem	kidnapper.
Bengü Tezcan	Cansu Demiray	Zeynep's sister. Zafer and Suna's daughter.
Zeynep Kadıoğlu	Eylul Demiray	Zeynep's sister, Zafer and Suna's little daughter.

== Production ==
The production faced financial issues during its first months.

== Reception ==
The series was also shown in Macedonia and because of its popularity, the viewers asked for the last episode to be shown again.

The film was described as a "popular detective drama."
