= Fuat Yaman =

Turkish football coach

Personal information
- Date of birth: 5 December 1958 (age 67)
- Place of birth: Kırklareli, Turkey
- Position: Midfielder

Youth career
- 1974–1978: Beşiktaş

Senior career*
Years	Team	Apps	(Gls)
1978–1980	Beşiktaş	13	(0)
1980–1984	Zonguldakspor	101	(11)
1984–1985	Antalyaspor	31	(4)
1985–1986	Zonguldakspor	34	(7)
1986–1988	Eskişehirspor	43	(2)
1988–1990	Konyaspor	58	(6)
1990–1992	Sakaryaspor	38	(1)
1992–1993	Zeytinburnuspor	14	(2)
Total		332	(33)

Managerial career
- 1997–1999: Beşiktaş (assistant)
- 1999: Beşiktaş (caretaker)
- 1999–2001: Çanakkale Dardanelspor
- 2001–2002: Kayseri Erciyesspor
- 2002–2003: Çaykur Rizespor
- 2005: Karvan
- 2005–2006: Kocaelispor
- 2007: İstanbulspor
- 2009–2010: Altay
- 2010: Konyaspor
- 2012: Bandırmaspor
- * Club domestic league appearances and goals

Fuat Yaman (born 5 December 1958) is a Turkish football coach and former player who last managed Bandırmaspor.

== Career ==
Yaman is a product of the Beşiktaş J.K. youth system, having played 4 years with the club. He became professional at Beşiktaş at second half of 1978–79 season. He also played for Zonguldakspor (1980–1984) and (1985–1986), Antalyaspor (1984–1985), Eskişehirspor (1986–1988), Konyaspor (1988–1990), Sakaryaspor (1990–1992) and Zeytinburnuspor (1992–1993) as midfielder. He retired in 1993.

He was the assistant of John Benjamin Toshack at Beşiktaş J.K. When the Welshman was sacked he was appointed interim manager for a while.

He also coached Çanakkale Dardanelspor, Kayserispor, Çaykur Rizespor, İstanbulspor, Kocaelispor, Konyaspor and Bandırmaspor.

Yaman then went to Azerbaijan to coach Karvan. He was sacked when Karvan was knocked out from the UEFA Intertoto-Cup.

== Personal life ==
He is the uncle of actor Can Yaman.
