= Bay Yanlış =

- Genre: Romantic comedy
- Screenplay by: Aslı Zengin; Banu Zengin Tak
- Directed by: Deniz Yorulmazer
- Starring: Can Yaman; Özge Gürel
- Opening theme: Bay Yanlış - Jenerik
- Composer: Cem Öget
- Country of origin: Turkey
- Original language: Turkish

Production
- Producer: Faruk Turgut
- Production locations: Istanbul; Göcek, Muğla
- Cinematography: Tarık Erkan
- Running time: 130 minutes
- Production company: Gold Film

Original release
- Network: FOX
- Release: 26 June 2020

Bay Yanlış (transl. Mr. Wrong) is a Turkish romantic comedy television series produced by Gold Film, the first episode of which was released on June 26, 2020, directed by Deniz Yorulmazer, written by the duo Aslı Zengin and Banu Zengin, and starring Can Yaman and Özge Gürel. The series concluded with its 14th episode, released on October 2, 2020.

== Cast and characters ==
=== Main characters ===
Actor	Character	Episodes
Can Yaman	Özgür Atasoy	1-14
Özge Gürel	Ezgi İnal	1-14

=== Assistant characters ===
Actor	Character	Episodes
Gürgen Öz	Levent Yazman	1-14
Fatma Toptaş	Cansu Akman	1-14
Suat Sungur	Ünal Yılmaz	1-14
Lale Başar	Sevim Atasoy	1-14
Deniz Özerman	Fitnat Atasoy	1-14
Cemre Gümeli	Deniz Koparan	1-14
Serkay Tütüncü	Ozan Dinçer	1-14
Sarp Can Köroğlu	Serdar Öztürk	1-14
Taygun Sungar	Soner Seçkin	1-14
Feri Baycu Güler	Nevin Yılmaz	1-14
Ece Irtem	Gizem Sezer	1-14
Anil Çelik	Emre Eren	1-14
Kimya Gökçe Aytaç	İrem Doğan	1-14
Ada Arca	Zeynep Yazman	1-14

== Broadcast ==
Season	Day and Time	First released	Last released	Episodes	Year	TV Channel
Season 1	Friday 8.00 pm	26 June 2020	2 October 2020	14	2020	FOX

== Episodes ==
=== Season 1 (2020) ===
Episode	Original release date	Directed by	Written by
1	26 June 2020	Deniz Yorulmazer	Aslı Zengin, Banu Zengin Tak
2	3 July 2020	Deniz Yorulmazer	Aslı Zengin, Banu Zengin Tak
3	10 July 2020	Deniz Yorulmazer	Aslı Zengin, Banu Zengin Tak
4	17 July 2020	Deniz Yorulmazer	Aslı Zengin, Banu Zengin Tak
5	24 August 2020	Deniz Yorulmazer	Aslı Zengin, Banu Zengin Tak
6	31 July 2020	Deniz Yorulmazer	Aslı Zengin, Banu Zengin Tak
7	7 August 2020	Deniz Yorulmazer	Aslı Zengin, Banu Zengin Tak
8	14 August 2020	Deniz Yorulmazer	Aslı Zengin, Banu Zengin Tak
9	21 August 2020	Deniz Yorulmazer	Aslı Zengin, Banu Zengin Tak
10	28 August 2020	Deniz Yorulmazer	Aslı Zengin, Banu Zengin Tak
11	4 September 2020	Deniz Yorulmazer	Aslı Zengin, Banu Zengin Tak
12	11 September 2020	Deniz Yorulmazer	Aslı Zengin, Banu Zengin Tak
13	18 September 2020	Deniz Yorulmazer	Aslı Zengin, Banu Zengin Tak
14 (Final)	2 October 2020	Deniz Yorulmazer	Aslı Zengin, Banu Zengin Tak

== Representation in other countries ==
Country	Channel	Broadcasting name	Release date
Northern Cyprus	FOX	Bay Yanlış	26 June 2020
Italy	Canale 5	Mr. Wrong - Lezioni d'amore	31 May 2021
Spain	Atresmedia	El hombre equivocado	October 2021
Czech Republic	Prima Love	Recept na lásku	March 2021 (iPrima.cz) June 2021 (Prima Love)
Albania	3 Plus	Mësime dashurie	18 July 2021
Slovenia	Voyo	Gospod Napačni	10 December 2021
Hungary	LifeTV	Mr. Wrong	19 November 2022

== Awards and nominations ==
The series was nominated for awards in three categories at the 47th Golden Butterfly Awards.

Year	Award	Category	Recipient(s)	Result
2020	PRODU Awards	Best TV Series	Bay Yanlış	Nominated
2020	PRODU Awards	Best Romantic Comedy Actress	Özge Gürel	Nominated
2020	PRODU Awards	Best Romantic Comedy Actor	Can Yaman	Nominated
2021	47th Golden Butterfly Awards	Best Romantic Comedy Series	Bay Yanlış	Nominated
2021	47th Golden Butterfly Awards	Best Romantic Comedy Actress	Özge Gürel	Nominated
2021	47th Golden Butterfly Awards	Best Romantic Comedy Actor	Can Yaman	Nominated
2022	Premios Nova	Best TV Series	Bay Yanlış	Won
2022	Premios Telenovelas España Awards 2022	Best TV Series	Bay Yanlış	Won
