= The Mountain II =

2016 Turkish film

- Directed by: Alper Çağlar
- Produced by: Alper Çağlar; Mars Entertainment Group
- Starring: Çağlar Ertuğrul; Ufuk Bayraktar; Murat Serezli; Ahu Türkpençe; Atılgan Gümüş; Murat Arkın; Emir Benderlioğlu; Ahmet Pınar; Armağan Oğuz; Açelya Özcan; Bedii Akın; Uğur Özarslan
- Release date: November 4, 2016
- Running time: 135 minutes
- Country: Turkey
- Language: Turkish
- Budget: ₺1,700,000
- Box office: ₺40,614,711

The Mountain II (Turkish: Dağ II), also known as Brothers in Arms, is a Turkish drama and action film directed by Alper Çağlar in 2016. It is a sequel to The Mountain, which was released in 2012. The film was first screened at theatres on November 4, 2016.

== Plot ==
Ceyda, a journalist, is abducted by ISIS terrorists in northern Iraq while she is covering a story on Yezidi people and their story of long-suffering and abandonment. A Turkish special forces team of seven headed by Commander Veysel flies out to rescue her. We see the events through the eyes of Oğuz as the film begins in medias res. His flashbacks show us the life and memories of these men up until they came to the rescue mission. Oğuz and Bekir are best of friends and was saved by two Special Force commandos who laid their lives on the line for Oğuz and Bekir which is a determining factor in their joining the force.

Ceyda is rescued from her ISIS captors seconds before death by the special forces team after which they start moving along to the mountain to the LZ (landing zone), from where they will be airlifted. On their way, they encounter a group of rebels who are torturing the Yezidis and Iraqi Turks, they rescue a girl in her teens and a woman being tortured by ISIS terrorists. They continue on their journey to the LZ (landing zone) and upon reaching the last village near the LZ, they find out that the village would be attacked by a battalion of ISIS terrorists the next morning. Instead of abandoning the defenceless villagers to the invaders, and leaving when the air support reaches out to them, the commander sends the children of the village along with Ceyda to safety. Meanwhile, Commander Veysel and his six men stay back in the village to face hundreds of terrorists with their limited resources. After securing the villagers in a coal house, they hoist the Turkish flag over the building. The special forces team with their advanced abilities and peculiar set of skills, manage to bring the terrorist battalion down despite their lack of numbers. However, the strength of the team reduces to four with the deaths of the Commander himself, Mustafa and Eşref. The commander before dying, orders his men to ask evacuation of all the villagers from the HQ and they call it in.

== Cast ==
Actor	Role
Çağlar Ertuğrul	First Lieutenant Oğuz Çağlar
Ufuk Bayraktar	Specialist Bekir Özbey
Murat Serezli	Lieutenant Colonel Veysel Gökmusa
Ahu Türkpençe	Ceyda Balaban
Atılgan Gümüş	Master Sergeant Mustafa Şahin
Murat Arkın	Staff Sergeant Arif Sayar
Ahmet Pınar	Master Sergeant Eşref Çullu
Armağan Oğuz	Sergeant Baybars Yücel
Emir Benderlioğlu	Batur Altınbilek
Açelya Özcan	Nabat
Buse Varol	Ece
Ozan Ağaç	Çiya
Uğur Özarslan	Civan Hatipoğlu

== See also ==
- 2016 in film
- Turkish films of 2016
