= Dolunay (TV series) =

- Also known as: Full Moon
- Genre: Romantic comedy Drama
- Created by: David Cycon
- Written by: Fikret Bekler; Elif Ozsut; Aysen Günsu Teker; Kerim Ceylan; Zeynep Arslanpay
- Directed by: Cagri Bayrak
- Starring: Can Yaman; Özge Gürel
- Country of origin: Turkey
- Original language: Turkish
- No. of seasons: 1
- No. of episodes: 26

Production
- Producer: Yagmur Ünal
- Production location: Istanbul
- Running time: 120 minutes

Original release
- Network: Star TV
- Release: July 4 – December 31, 2017

Dolunay (International title: Full Moon) is a Turkish drama series broadcast on Star TV. It premiered on the network from July 4 to December 31, 2017.

== Cast ==
=== Main ===
- Özge Gürel as Nazmiye "Nazlı" Pınar: a young culinary student who aspires to own her own restaurant. She is often stressed due to being responsible for her younger troublemaker sister, Asuman.
- Can Yaman as Ferit Aslan: a wealthy, handsome businessman in the public eye. He has a deep distrust of people, women in particular, and cannot forgive them due to trauma of catching his mother cheating on his father.

=== Recurring ===
- Hakan Kurtaş as Deniz Kaya: Demet and Demir's Brother, Zeynep and (by extension) Ferit's brother-in-law and close friend. Unlike Ferit, he lives a carefree and unstructured life as a musician. He falls in love with Nazli upon meeting her, and his jealousy of Ferit begins to drive a wedge between them. He is very emotional and reckless.
- Necip Memili as Hakan Önder. Demet's husband, who has a personal vendetta against Ferit. He wishes to adopt Bulut in order to obtain shares in Pusula holding (Aslan and Kaya family's company). He is involved in illegal trafficking and is later abusive towards his wife.
- Öznur Serçeler as Fatoş Yalçın. Nazli's best friend and roommate. An aspiring but unemployed fashion designer, Fatoş pretends to be wealthy to ingratiate herself with Engin.
- Türkü Turan as Alya. Deniz's ex-girlfriend, who is a singer. She is still in love with Deniz and tries to win him back, but is constantly saddened to see his affection for Nazli. She tries to make him see that Nazli is in love with Ferit and comforts him during his heartbreak.
- İlayda Akdoğan as Asuman Pınar. Nazli's younger mischievous sister. She is a tourism student but often skips class to hang out with her friends. Aspiring to live like the rich, she accumulates debts and even resorts to shoplifting. Demet takes advantage of her need for money to sabotage Ferit.
- Berk Yaygın as Tarık. Ferit's assistant and driver. He and Fatoş bond over their mutual love for food, and he eventually falls in love with her.
- Balamir Emren as Engin. Ferit's best friend and business partner. He often is the one to point out things that Ferit refuses to admit to himself, such as his feelings for Nazli.
- Alara Bozbey as Demet Kaya Önder. Demir and Deniz's sister, Ferit's sister-in-law (by extension) and former fiancée. She is estranged from her family because she married Hakan against their wishes and has not spoken to any of them for years. She wishes to adopt Bulut because he is the only thing she has left of her brother, but her husband uses this to his monetary advantage by gaining control of the business.
- Alihan Türkdemir as Bulut Kaya, Demir and Zeynep's son. Ferit's nephew, whom he tries to adopt. He is very fond of Nazli and often tries to set her up with his uncle.
- Yeşim Gül Aksar as Leman Aslan. Ferit's mother who is estranged from him because she had an affair when he was a child.
- Irmak Ünal as Zeynep Aslan Kaya.(2 episodes) Ferit's sister, married to Demir Kaya, and Bulut's Mother.
- Mert Yavuzcan as Demir Kaya.(2 episodes) Ferit's Brother-in-law, married to Zeynep, and Bulut's Father.
- Özlem Türay as İkbal. Ferit's assistant.
- Ayumi Takano as Manami. Nazli's former Japanese instructor who becomes her business partner.
- Gamze Aydogdu as Melis, Bulut's nanny at Demet's house.
- Emre Kentmenoglu as Bekir. Hakan's henchman.
- Minel Üstüner as Pelin, Ferit's ex-girlfriend before his engagement to Nazli.

== Series overview ==
Season	Episodes	Originally released	
Season	Episodes	First released	Last released
1	26	July 4, 2017	December 31, 2017
