= Phil Latulippe =

Philippe Latulippe, better known as Phil Latulippe (March 16, 1919, in Cabano, Quebec – September 24, 2006), C.M., C.Q., M.M.M., C.D., was a Canadian soldier, athlete and philanthropist.

He served as a professional soldier in the Canadian Armed Forces from 1940 to 1974. He was wounded to the legs in the Second World War. He began training in track and field at age 48. After his military career, he became well known as a record-breaking marathon runner and as an advocate of running and physical exercise in general. Between the ages of 49 and 76, he ran 210782 km. The notice for the Order of Canada mentions that "for nearly 20 years he has proceeded from record to record, whether in walking or cross-country skiing, never for his own profit but always for a deserving charity. He continues to devote himself body and soul to assisting the disabled, young people and the elderly.". In 1981, he created the Phil-et-Lucie-Latulippe Foundation to encourage the practice of walking, in particular for children and handicapped people, in Canada and abroad. He was also involved in several humanitarian causes. His actions and his work earned him several awards.

A biography, L'homme qui est allé au bout des routes, was published in 1995. He suffered a stroke in 2002, but still continued to walk 6 km per day. He died in 2006. The Complexe sportif Phil-Latulippe, a sports center, is named in his honor in Loretteville (Québec), where he resided for many years.

== Awards ==
- 1939–45 Star
- France and Germany Star
- Medal of Normandy
- War Medal 1939–1945
- Canadian Volunteer Service Medal 1939-1945
- 1967 - Canadian Centennial Medal
- 1968 - 'Member of the Order of Saint John of Jerusalem
- 1973 - Member of the Order of Military Merit
- 1977 - Queen Elizabeth II Silver Jubilee Medal
- 1984 - Member of the Order of Canada
- 1992 - 125th Anniversary of the Confederation of Canada Medal
- 2004 - Knight of the National Order of Quebec
- Medal of the Université du Québec à Rimouski
