= Bakır Çağlar =

Turkish jurist, lawyer, and academic

Bakır Çağlar (1941 – 25 July 2011) was a Turkish jurist, lawyer and professor of constitutional law at Istanbul University Faculty of Political Sciences. He was defense lawyer of Turkey in the European Court of Human Rights for seven years.

Bakır Çağlar graduated from St. Joseph High School for Boys. After that, he was admitted to Istanbul University Faculty of Law and received his LL.B. degree. He earned Doctor of Law degrees from University of Paris 1 Pantheon-Sorbonne.

He died on 25 July 2011 in the Turkish Republic of Northern Cyprus.
