= Çağlar Ertuğrul =

Turkish actor and mechanical engineer

- Born: 5 November 1987 (age 38); Karşıyaka, İzmir, Turkey
- Education: Mechanical Engineering, Koç University
- Occupations: Actor, mechanical engineer
- Years active: 2009–present
- Known for: Dağ
- Notable work: Dağ

Çağlar Ertuğrul (born 5 November 1987) is a Turkish actor with a degree in mechanical engineering from Koç University. He won the Golden Butterfly Awards for Best Actor in a Romantic Comedy in 2020 for his role in Afili Aşk and Best Actor in a TV Series in 2021 for his role in Teşkilat. He is regarded as one of the best Turkish actors in Turkish dramas.

== Early life and career ==
Ertuğrul was born on 5 November 1987 in Karşıyaka, İzmir. His father is a geological engineer and his mother is a dentist. He also has an older sister. He completed his primary education from Bornova High School and received a university degree in Mechanical Engineering from Koç University. He later decided to pursue a career in the arts. His first acting job was at a stage play Romeolar ve Julietler at Koç University on 13 April 2009.

In 2012, Alper Çağlar directed a military feature film called Dağ in which Ertuğrul made his film debut in a leading role. The film was a success making Ertuğrul a well known name instantly. The same year, Ertuğrul made his television debut in the series Benim İçin Üzülme as Sinan Avcıoğlu in a leading role.

In 2014, he played the role of Ersen in the coming of age drama Boynu Bükükler and starred as Başar Korkmaz in Beyaz Karanfil. He also made guest appearances in the TV series Medcezir and "Kurt Seyit & Şura" along with starring in films such as Bana Masal Anlatma (2015), "Ailecek Şaşkınız" (2018) and "Yanımda Kal" (2018) in lead roles. In 2016, he reprised his role as "Oğuz" in Dağ 2. The film achieved global recognition and became the most watched film of 2016 in Turkey.

During 2017–2018, Ertuğrul appeared in the television drama Fazilet Hanım ve Kızları as Yağız Egemen opposite Deniz Baysal. His performance alongside Baysal was appreciated by viewers and their pairing became a fan-favorite. He was also seen as Akın Yılmaz in the film Biz Size Döneriz that same year.

During 2019–2020, Ertuğrul played the role of a handsome playboy Kerem Yiğiter in the lighthearted romcom TV Series Afili Aşk opposite Burcu Özberk for which he received the Golden Butterfly Award for Best Actor in a Romantic Comedy.

From 2021 to 2022, Ertuğrul appeared as Serdar Kılıçaslan, an intelligence officer in the TV series Teşkilat. The series garnered high viewership and topped the ratings chart from its first episode, breaking many records. For this role, he won multiple awards including the Golden Butterfly Award for Best Actor. He quit the show with the completion of the second season in 2022.

In 2023, Ertuğrul starred in the series Magarsus as Turgut Kurak alongside Merve Dizdar and Berkay Ateş, on BluTV. The series was renewed for another season which aired in March, 2025. Ertuğrul was also seen as Kaptan Vandyke in the second and third season of the BluTV series Prens in April 2024 and June 2025 respectively. Ertuğrul played Metin Yazıcı alongside Hazal Kaya in TOD series Sorgu in Season 1 (2024) and Season 2 (2025).

Ertuğrul returned to television as "Kartal" with the TV series Kalpazan in September 2024 on Show TV. The series was cancelled by the channel after the 8th episode. As of May 2026, Ertuğrul is seen playing the role of Kadir in the TV series Çirkin alongside Derya pinar ak on Star TV.

== Filmography ==
Movies
Year	Title	Role	Notes
2012	Dağ	Üsteğmen Oğuz Çağlar	Leading role
2015	Bana Masal Anlatma	Haşmet	Supporting role
2016	Dağ II	Üsteğmen Oğuz Çağlar	Leading role
2017	Biz Size Döneriz	Akin Yilmaz	Leading role
2018	Ailecek Şaşkınız	Onay	Supporting role
2018	Yanımda Kal	Emir Kurt	Leading role
2019	Kızım Gibi Kokuyorsun	İbrahim	Leading role
Web series
Year	Title	Role	Notes
2023	Magarsus	Turgut Kurak	Leading role
2024	Prens	Kaptan Vandyke	Guest Appearance
2024	Sorgu	Metin Yazıcı	Leading role
TV series
Year	Title	Role	Notes
2012–2014	Benim İçin Üzülme	Sinan Avcıoğlu	Leading role
2014	Beyaz Karanfil	Başar Korkmaz	Leading role
2014	Boynu Bükükler	Galoş Ersen	Leading role
2014	Kurt Seyit ve Şura	Yusuf	Supporting role
2014	Medcezir	Inanç Pars	Guest appearance
2017–2018	Fazilet Hanım ve Kızları	Yağız Egemen	Leading role
2019–2020	Afili Aşk	Kerem Yiğiter	Leading role
2021–2022	Teşkilat	Serdar Kılıçarslan	Leading role
2024	Kalpazan	Kartal Akkaya	Leading role
2026	Çirkin	Kadir Tunalı	Leading role

=== Theater plays ===
- Romeolar ve Julietler
- Yobaz
- Kaos Teorileri
- Leş

== Awards and nominations ==
Year	Awards	Category	Works	Result
2018	Turkey Youth Awards	Best TV Actor	Fazilet Hanım ve Kızları	Won
2019	East Europe International Film Festival	Best Lead Actor In A Foreign Language Film	Kızım Gibi Kokuyorsun	Won
2019	Golden Butterfly Awards	Best Actor in a Romantic Comedy Series	Afili Aşk	Won
2019	Golden Butterfly Awards	Best TV Couple (Kerem and Ayşe)	Afili Aşk	Nominated
2019	Turkey Youth Awards	Best Actor in Motion Picture	Yanımda Kal	Won
2019	Turkey Youth Awards	Best Movie Actor	Yanımda Kal	Won
2020	North Europe International Film Festival	Best Lead Actor in a Foreign Language Film	Kızım Gibi Kokuyorsun	Won
2020	Golden Palm Awards	Best TV Series Actor	Afili Aşk	Nominated
2020	Turkey Youth Awards	Best TV Actor	Afili Aşk	Won
2021	Golden Butterfly Awards	Best Actor	Teşkilat	Won
2022	Quality Awards	Best Quality Actor	Teşkilat	Won
