= Serkan Çayoğlu =

Turkish actor (born 1987)

- Çayoğlu in 2019
- Born: 31 May 1987 (age 39); Germany
- Citizenship: German, Turkish
- Education: Erlangen University
- Occupation: Actor
- Spouse: Özge Gürel (m. 2022)

Serkan Çayoğlu (Turkish pronunciation: [ˈsæɾkan t͡ʃaˈjoːɫu]; born 31 May 1987) is a German born Turkish actor, known for his role in the romantic comedy Kiraz Mevsimi, military series Börü, historical series Mehmed: Fetihler Sultanı and Bir Zamanlar Kıbrıs, and the crime series Halka. He starred alongside his wife, Özge Gürel, in Börü and Kiraz Mevsimi.

== Early life and education ==
Serkan Çayoğlu was born on 31 May 1987 in Germany to a Turkish family. He completed his education in Erlangen University's Economics department in Germany. While studying at university, he also started to work as a model.

== Career ==
Çayoğlu, who came to Istanbul to become an actor, received acting lessons from Ümit Çırak and Dolunay Soysert at Ümit Çırak's Modern Acting Techniques Atelier. In 2012, he started his acting career by playing the friend of Merve Boluğur's character from Italy in the season finale of Kuzey Güney. He also played in Hande Yener's "Ya Ya Ya" music video in 2013. In 2014, Çayoğlu started to be known with Kiraz Mevsimi as Ayaz.

In 2024, Çayoğlu bagged the lead role of Mehmed II, in Miray Yapım's production of the Turkish historical fiction series Mehmed: Fetihler Sultanı. The show has gained popularity and has gone on to win numerous awards including the "Series of the Year" award at the 10th Anatolian Media Awards.

== Personal life ==
On 13 August 2022, Çayoğlu and his longtime girlfriend since 2014, Özge Gürel, married in Germany. Family and close friends attended the intimate ceremony.

== Filmography ==
=== Television ===
Television
Year	Title	Role	Note
2012	Kuzey Güney	Guest	Guest role
2014	Zeytin Tepesi	Burak Altaylı	Supporting role
2014–2015	Kiraz Mevsimi	Ayaz Dinçer	Leading role
2016	Hayatımın Aşkı	Demir Cerrahoğlu	Leading role
2018	Börü	Kaya Ülgen	Leading role
2019	Halka	Cihangir Tepeli	Leading role
2020	Yeni Hayat	Adem Şahin	Leading role
2021–2022	Bir Zamanlar Kıbrıs	Ankaralı	Leading role
2023	Kader Bağları	Kerem Sipahioğlu	Leading role
2024-2025	Mehmed: Fetihler Sultanı	Mehmed II	Leading role
2025	Vefa Sultan	Mehmed II	Guest actor

=== Films ===
Film
Year	Title	Role	Notes
2018	Börü	Kaya Ülgen	Leading role
2023	Aaahh Belinda	Serkan Gürsoy	Leading role
2023	Oregon	Hakan	Leading role
2025	She Said Maybe	Kent	

== Awards and nominations ==
Awards and nominations
Year	Award	Category	Work	Result
2015	Near East University 5th Video Music Awards	Best Debut by an Actor	Kiraz Mevsimi	Won
2015	6th KTÜ Media Awards	Best Debut by an Actor	Kiraz Mevsimi	Won
2015	42nd Pantene Golden Butterfly Awards	Best Couple (Öykü-Ayaz)	Kiraz Mevsimi	Nominated
2016	1st YBU Media Awards	Best Television Actor	Kiraz Mevsimi	Won
2016	42nd Pantene Golden Butterfly Awards	Best Comedy Actor	Hayatımın Aşkı	Nominated
