= Reşat Çağlar =

Cypriot diplomat

Mr. Reşat Çağlar is a diplomat from the Turkish Republic of Northern Cyprus. He served as the de facto TRNC Chief of Mission to the United Nations from 2002 to 2007, when he was replaced by Kemal Gökeri (though as the UN does not recognize the sovereignty of the TRNC, he is officially regarded as the Representative of the Turkish Cypriot Community in New York City).

== See also ==
- Foreign relations of Northern Cyprus
- Politics of Northern Cyprus
