= Ufuk Bayraktar =

Turkish actor

- Born: 12 September 1981 (age 44); Istanbul, Turkey
- Occupation: Actor
- Years active: 2003–present
- Spouse: Merve Bayraktar
- Children: 1

Ufuk Bayraktar (born 12 September 1981) is a Turkish actor.

== Life and career ==
After finishing high school at Gürsoy College, he decided not to go to university and started to work at Firuzağa Restaurant, which was owned by his father Cevahir Bayraktar in Cihangir. He was discovered by Zeki Demirkubuz, who later cast him in his movies Bekleme Odası and Kader. He eventually appeared in Nuri Bilge Ceylan's İklimler, Semih Kaplanoğlu's Yumurta, Cemal Şan's Ali'nin Sekiz Günü and Feo Aladağ's Ayrılık. On the ATV series Ezel, he portrayed the youth of "Ramiz Dayı", the character played by Tuncel Kurtiz. He subsequently appeared in a number of TV series, including Milat.

He is married to Merve Bayraktar, with whom he has a son named Efe Cevahir.

In 2018, he was sentenced to 6 months in prison after a lengthy trial for being involved in a fight with an unlicensed gun, which was his father's heirloom. In 2020, he was sentenced to 4 years and 5 months in prison after throwing a bottle at a woman and attacking a young guy with a machete.

== Filmography ==
Yıl	Film	Rol	Notlar ve ödüller
2003	Bekleme Odası	Ferit	
2006	Kader	Bekir	43rd Antalya Golden Orange Film Festival Behlül Dal Digitürk Jury Special Award for Young Talent; Istanbul Film Festival Best Actor Award; Cinema Writers Association Awards Promising Young Actor Award
2006	İklimler	Taksici	
2007	Kartallar Yüksek Uçar	Hasan	TV series
2007	Yumurta	Haluk	Nominated—Cinema Writers Association Awards Best Supporting Actor Award
2008	Ali'nin Sekiz Günü	Kemal	
2008	Girdap	Konuşmacı	
2010–2011	Ezel	Young Ramiz Karaeski	TV series
2009	Yeni Baştan	guest appearance	TV series
2010	Memleket Meselesi	Polis	
2010	Ayrılık	Kemal	
2012	Yeraltı		
2012	Toprağın Çocukları	Cevher	
2012	Bu Son Olsun	Ertuğrul	
2012	Dağ	Bekir	
2012	Çanakkale 1915	Seyit Onbaşı	
2015	MilaT	Hamza	TV series
2016	Sevda Kuşun Kanadında	Ömer	TV series
2016	Dağ II	Bekir	
2016	Kümes	Süleyman	
2016	Vatanım Sensin	Dağıstanlı	TV series
2020	Dayı: Bir Adamın Hikayesi		
2024	Mehmed: Fetihler Sultani	Battal Bey	TV series
