= Cemre Gümeli =

Turkish actress (born 1993)

- Born: Cemre Gümeli; 24 September 1993 (age 33); Istanbul, Turkey
- Occupation: Actress
- Height: 1.72 m (5 ft 7.72 in)

Cemre Gümeli (born 24 September 1993) is a Turkish actress.

== Biography ==
Born in 1993 in Istanbul, Turkey, Gümeli trained in ballet as a child. She studied media, communication and culture management at Istanbul Bilgi University.

She was an exchange student in New York City where she studied acting and art history, and trained within the Meisner system.

== Career ==
Gümeli has worked as a Shakespearian actor, playing the role of Puck in a 2015 production of A Midsummer Night's Dream directed by Caghan Suzgun at the Istasyon theatre, and Lady Anne in Richard III directed by Yiğit Sertdemir, at Kumbaracı 50 Theater.

In 2016 she got the role of Simay in the TV series Tatlı İntikam, and in 2018 she played the role of Hande Fettah in the miniseries Servet. In 2018 and 2019 she played the role of Cansu Kara in the series Elimi Birakma. In 2019 and 2020 she appeared in the web series Puma. In 2020, she joined the cast of the series Bay Yanlış, where she played the role of lawyer Deniz Koparan. In 2021 and 2022 she played the role of Meryem in the series Barbaros: Sword of the Mediterranean (Barbaroslar: Akdeniz'in Kilici). In 2025, she is playing the role of Fatma Hatun, in Kurulus Orhan.

== Filmography ==
=== Cinema ===
Year	Title	Director
2011	Game of Hera	Kıvanç Sezer

=== TV series ===
Year	Title	Role	Network	Notes
2016	Tatlı İntikam	Simay	Kanal D	30 episodes
2018	Servet	Hande Fettah	Show TV	4 episodes
2018–2019	Eli̇mi̇ Birakma	Cansu Kara	TRT 1	43 episodes
2020	Bay Yanlış	Deniz Koparan	FOX	14 episodes
2021–2022	Barbaros: Sword of the Mediterranean (Barbaroslar: Akdeniz'in Kilici)	Meryem	TRT 1	22 episodes
2023	Yüz Yıllık Mucize	Süreyya Anadolu	Star TV	13 episodes
2023	Yalı Çapkını	Talih Özgün	Star TV	3 episodes
2024	Şahane Hayatım	Elif Kadıoğlu	NOW	18 episodes
2025-2026	Kuruluş: Orhan	Fatma Hatun	ATV	24 episodes

=== Web TV ===
Year	Title
2019–2020	Puma

== Theater ==
Year	Title	Role	Director	Theater
2015	A Midsummer Night's Dream	Puck	Caghan Suzgun	Theater Istasyon
2017–2019	Richard III	Lady Anne	Yiğit Sertdemir	Theater Kumbaracı 50
