= Saruhan Hünel =

Turkish actor (born 1970)

- Born: Muharrem Saruhan Hünel; 7 January 1970 (age 55); Istanbul, Turkey
- Occupation: Actor
- Years active: 1992–present
- Spouse: Sergin Akyaz (m. 2003; div. 2010)
- Website: saruhanhunel.com.tr

Muharrem Saruhan Hünel (born 7 January 1970) is a Turkish actor. His mother is of Arab descent who moved from Baghdad to Turkey. His father is of Albanian descent and is a dancer. He has a sister, Aslı Hünel, who is a singer.

Hünel started his career through modeling. He made his cinematic debut in 1993 with a role in Yasak Sokaklar, and appeared in the movies Ufukta Bir Ağaç and Somuncu Baba: Aşkın Sırrı. In 1992, he had his first TV role with Gündüzün Karanlığı.

With Yeşim Büber, He had leading role in the series "Aynalı Tahir" and "Kaybolan Yıllar" for twice. She gained more fame through his role in Karagül. Between 2019 and 2020, Hünel portrayed the character of Alişar in the historical drama Kuruluş: Osman.

== Filmography ==
=== Film ===
- Somuncu Baba: Aşkın Sırrı (2016) - Abdurrahman Erzincani
- Yasak Sokaklar (1993)
- Ufukta Bir Ağaç (1993)

=== Television ===
- Yalnız Kurt (2022–)
- Kuruluş: Osman (2019–2020) - Alişar Bey
- Karagül (2015) - Kenan
- Oğurlanmış Arzular (2013)
- Araf Zamanı (2012) - Ali
- Yeni Baştan (2009)
- Serçe (2008) - Doğu
- Kaybolan Yıllar (2006–2007) - Esmer
- Melek (2002) - Ferhat
- Aynalı Tahir (1997) - Tilki Ekrem
- Tatlı Betüş (1993) -
- Gündüzün Karanlığı (1992)
