= İlayda Bostancıeri =

German politician (born 1995)

Member of the Landtag of North Rhine-Westphalia
- Incumbent
- Assumed office 1 June 2022

Personal details
- Born: 14 April 1995 (age 31)
- Party: Alliance 90/The Greens (since 2019)

İlayda Bostancıeri (born 14 April 1995) is a German politician serving as a member of the Landtag of North Rhine-Westphalia since 2022. From 2020 to 2022, she was a city councillor of Gelsenkirchen.
