= İlayda Çevik =

Turkish actress (born 1994)

- Born: 22 December 1994 (age 31); Balikesir, Turkey
- Education: Theater
- Occupation: Actress
- Years active: 2013–present
- Notable work: Karagül, Sen Anlat Karadeniz

İlayda Çevik (born 22 December 1994) is a Turkish actress. She is best known for playing Maya in the television series, Karagül. Çevik was born in Balikesir.

Cevik's first theater performance was a children's play called Children's Playground and she made her feature film debut in the film in 2015 with the film Kızım İçin, which starred Yetkin Dikinciler, Eda Ece, İnci Türkay and Berke Üzrek.

== Filmography ==
Television

Title	Role	Year	Network
Karagül	Maya Şamverdi	2013–2016	Fox Turkey
İsimsizler	Yıldız Keskin	2017	Kanal D
Savaşçı	Gülayşe	2017	Fox Turkey
Sen Anlat Karadeniz	Berrak Yılmaz	2018–2019	atv
Gel Dese Aşk	Bahar Çetin	2020	atv
Sen Çal Kapımı	Balca Koçak	2020–2021	Fox Turkey
Bir Zamanlar Çukurova	Betül Arcan	2021–2022	atv
Tuzak	Luna	2022–2023	TV8
Aldatmak	İpek Okuyan	2023–2024	atv
Halef: Köklerin Çağrısı	Hicran Yelduran	2025–2026	Now Turkey

Films

Year	Title	Role
2013	Kızım İçin	Ayça
2017	Niyazi Bey	

Music videos

Year	Artist	Title
2017	"Barış Bölükbaşı"	"My Name is Peace"
