= Can Yaman =

Turkish actor, model and lawyer (born 1989)

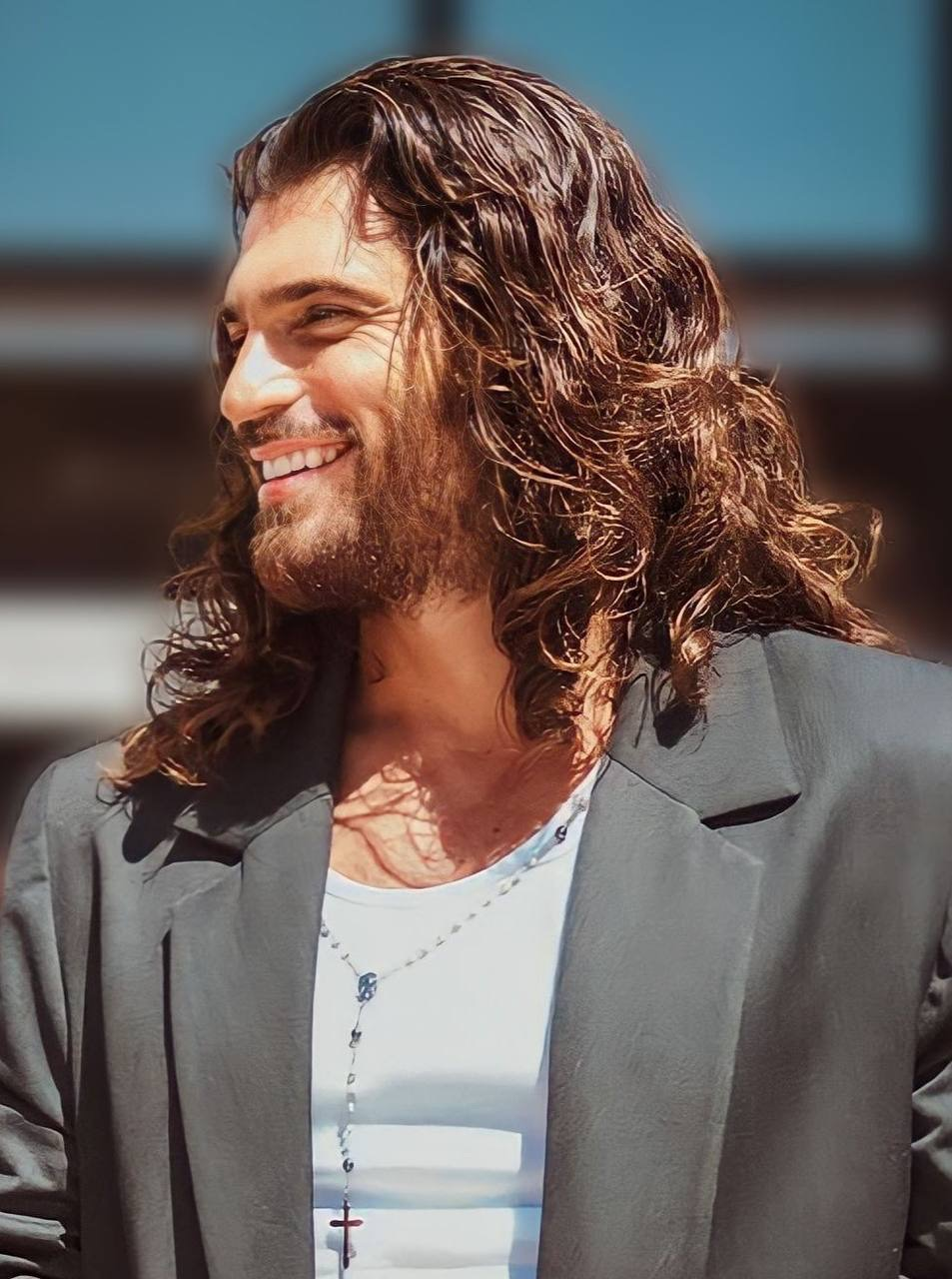
- Yaman in Margherita di Savoia in April 2023
- Born: 8 November 1989 (age 36); Istanbul, Turkey
- Education: Yeditepe University
- Occupations: Actor; model; lawyer; athlete
- Years active: 2013–present
- Known for: Dolunay; Erkenci Kuş; Bay Yanlış; Viola come il mare; Sandokan
- Height: 1.88 m (6 ft 2.02 in)
- Parents: Güven Yaman (father); Güldem Yaman (mother)
- Relatives: Fuat Yaman (uncle)
- Awards: Golden Butterfly Award; Murex d'Or

Can Yaman (Turkish pronunciation: [ˈdʒan jaˈman]; born 8 November 1989) is a Turkish-Albanian actor.

He received a Golden Butterfly Award for Best Actor in a Romantic Comedy in 2018 for his role in Erkenci Kuş as well as Murex d'Or in 2019. In 2020, he received an international PRODU2020 nomination, and in 2021, a nomination for Best Actor in a Romantic Comedy at the Golden Butterfly Awards for his role in the series Bay Yanlış. Yaman has also starred in the TV shows Gönül İşleri, İnadına Aşk, Hangimiz Sevmedik, and Dolunay. He also won the 7th GQ Man of the Year Award 2019 and several international awards for his charitable initiatives.

== Early life ==
Yaman was born on 8 November 1989 in Istanbul, Turkey. He is of Albanian origin on his father's side, his paternal grandfather having grown up in Pristina and his paternal grandmother in Skopje. He is the nephew of football coach Fuat Yaman.

Yaman studied at Bilfen College for primary school, then studied at the Liceo Italiano di Istanbul, where he finished as a top student. Yaman is fluent in several languages: Turkish, Italian, English, German, and also speaks Spanish. In 2012, he graduated from the Law Department of Yeditepe University, and began working at PricewaterhouseCoopers, where he met his current law firm partners. By the time he was 24, Yaman was working in mergers and acquisitions and writing articles for the tax section of Dünya newspaper. As he was finding success in the corporate law sector, he was also realizing that corporate life was not for him. While on summer leave from work, Yaman travelled to Bodrum where he met his eventual and current acting managers, Cüneyt Sayıl and İlker Bilgi.

== Career ==
He started his career in Gönül İşleri in 2014. In 2015, he starred in İnadına Aşk and starred in Hangimiz Sevmedik in 2016. The breakthrough of his career came in 2017 with the series Dolunay.

From 2018 to 2019, he played the lead role in the Turkish romantic comedy series Erkenci Kuş. He received several acting national awards and nominations including international Murex d'Or award for this series.

Υaman played the lead role in the Turkish short series Bay Yanlış. The series was produced by Gold Film, directed by Deniz Yorulmazer. It premiered on FOX in June 2020. For this series, he was nominated for Best Actor in Foreign Series at LATAM PRODU 2020 Awards.

In 2020, he became the face of the Turkish clothing brand TUDORS.

In December 2020, Yaman made an agreement with Lux Vide, an Italian production company, for the series Sandokan, which began to be aired in December 2025.

In March 2021, he was a guest in the series Che Dio ci aiuti, portraying the character of Gino. He then played Francesco Demir in the series Viola come il mare.

In winter 2022 Can Yaman shot international series El Turco starring Greta Ferro, William Kempe, Slavko Sobin and many other well known European actors. Originally the series was shot for Disney Plus, but following issues with the Disney Plus global organisation the production company Ay Yapim bought back the rights to the series and it is expected to launch on streaming platform in 2025.

In June 2024, Can Yaman deleted his 12 million follower Instagram account. He said he wanted to focus on his acting without social media disruptions. Can Yaman opened a new Instagram account in March 2025.

Yaman rejected the role of Asaf in The Ignorant Angels to play in the TV series Sandokan; the role was then passed onto Burak Deniz. After starring as the titular character in Sandokan, which premiered in December 2025, Yaman co-hosted the first night of the Sanremo Music Festival 2026.

== Filmography ==
=== Television ===
Year	Title	Role	Notes	Ref.
2014–2015	Gönül İşleri	Bedir Kocadağ	Leading Role	
2015	Saba ile Oyuna Geldik	Himself	Guest	
2015–2016	İnadına Aşk	Yalın Aras	Leading Role	
2016–2017	Hangimiz Sevmedik	Tarık Çam	Leading Role	
2017	Dolunay	Ferit Aslan	Leading Role	
2018–2019	Erkenci Kuş	Can Divit	Leading Role	
2018	O Ses Türkiye Yılbaşı Özel	Himself	Guest	
2019	Volverte a ver	Himself	Guest	
2020–2021–2022	C'è posta per te	Himself	Guest	
2020	Bay Yanlış	Özgür Atasoy	Leading Role	
2021	Che Dio ci aiuti	Gino	Guest Role	
2022–2025	Viola come il mare	Francesco Demir	Leading Role	
2025	La revuelta	Himself	Guest	
2025	Sandokan	Sandokan	Leading role	
2026	Sanremo Music Festival 2026	Co-host	Annual song contest (prime time)	

=== Web series ===
Year	Title	Role	Notes
2025	El Turco	Hasan Balaban	Leading Role

=== Commercial ===
Year	Title	Role
2018	CepteTEB	Brand ambassador
2018	DESA	Brand ambassador
2020	Pasha Fencer	Brand ambassador
2020–2022	TUDORS	Brand ambassador
2021–2023	De Cecco	Brand ambassador
2022	Mercedes-Benz	Brand ambassador
2022	Disney+	Brand ambassador
2022	Dolce & Gabbana	Brand ambassador

=== Music video ===
Year	Title	Role	Notes
2013	Gülnur Gökçe	"Porselen Düşler"	Actors

== Awards and nominations ==
Year	Award	Category	Result
2017	Golden Butterfly Awards	Best Romantic Comedy Actor (Dolunay)	Nominated
2017	Golden Butterfly Awards	Best TV Couple (Dolunay; shared with: Özge Gürel)	Nominated
2018	Golden Butterfly Awards	Best Romantic Comedy Actor (Erkenci Kuş)	Won
2018	Golden Butterfly Awards	Best TV Couple (Erkenci Kuş; shared with: Demet Özdemir)	Nominated
2019	Golden Butterfly Awards	Best Actor in a Romantic Comedy Series (Erkenci Kuş)	Nominated
2019	Golden Butterfly Awards	Best TV Couple (Erkenci Kuş; shared with: Demet Özdemir)	Nominated
2019	Golden Star Awards	Best TV Series Actor (Erkenci Kuş)	Won
2019	Murex d'Or	Best Foreign Actor (Erkenci Kuş)	Won
2019	E!News TV	Top Leading Man (Erkenci Kuş)	Won
2020	PRODU Awards	Best Actor in Foreign Series – Talento (Bay Yanlış)	Nominated
2021	Filming Italy Best Movie Award 2021	TV Personality of the Year 2021	Won
2021	Golden Butterfly Awards	Best Actor in a Romantic Comedy Series (Bay Yanlis)	Nominated
2022	Monte Carlo Film Festival of Comedy	Social Responsibility Award (Charity)	Won
2022	Filming Italy Sardegna 2022	Creativity Award (Charity)	Won
2022	Filming Italy Best Film 2022	International Award 2022	Won
2023	Marateale in Winter Award 2023	International Actor With Extraordinary Expressive Power	Won
2024	Premio Kineo	Best Actor in TV Series	Nominated
