= Özge Gürel =

Turkish actress (born 1987)

- Born: 5 February 1987 (age 39); Istanbul, Turkey
- Education: Beykent University
- Occupation: Actress
- Years active: 2010–present
- Spouse: Serkan Çayoğlu (m. 2022)

Özge Gürel (born 5 February 1987) is a Turkish actress and singer. She starred alongside her husband Serkan Çayoğlu in Kiraz Mevsimi and Börü. She also starred in Dolunay and Bay Yanlis alongside Can Yaman.

== Life and career ==
Of Circassian and Turkish origin, Gürel was born on 5 February 1987 in Istanbul. Her father is of Circassian descent while her maternal family were Turkish immigrants from Thessaloniki. She lived in Silivri, Turkey, until she finished high school. Gürel initially studied business at Beykent University, but did not finish it. She then took acting lessons, followed by acting management lessons.

Gürel began acting as Zeynep in Kızım Nerede?. In 2014, she became the lead actress in Kiraz Mevsimi. Between 2016 and 2017, Kiraz Mevsimi was broadcast on Canale 5, one of Italy's television channels, and became the first Turkish TV series broadcast on Italian television. She played the leading role in the TV series Yıldızlar Şahidim in 2017. Gürel also played the lead role of Nazlı Pinar Aslan in Dolunay alongside Can Yaman in 2017.

In 2020, Gürel started playing the lead role Ezgi in the Turkish series Bay Yanlış (Mr. Wrong), opposite Can Yaman. The series was produced by Gold Film, directed by Deniz Yorulmazer, and written by Aslı Zengin and Banu Zengin Tak. It premiered on FOX in June 2020 and concluded in October 2020.

== Personal life ==
On 14 July 2022, Gürel and her longtime boyfriend, Serkan Çayoğlu, whom she had been dating since 2014, married in Germany. Family and close friends attended the ceremony.

== Filmography ==
Film
Year	Title	Role	Note
2014	Bizum Hoca	Kardelen	Supporting role
2017	Organik Aşk Hikâyeleri	Demet	Leading role
2017	İlk Öpücük	Bahar	Leading role
2018	Börü	Gökçe Demir	Leading role
2019	Annem	Nazlı	Leading role
2020	Kar Kırmızı	Tazegül	Leading role
2024	Savrulan Zaman	Nur	Leading role
Television
Year	Title	Role	Note
2010–2011	Kızım Nerede?	Zeynep Demiray	Leading role
2011	Ve İnsan Aldandı	Derya	Supporting role
2012	Huzur Sokağı	Melisa	Guest appearance
2013–2014	Muhteşem Yüzyıl	Rana Hatun	Guest appearance
2014	Medcezir	Ada	Supporting role
2014–2015	Kiraz Mevsimi	Öykü Acar Dinçer	Leading role
2017	Yıldızlar Şahidim	Haziran	Leading role
2017	Dolunay	Nazlı Pınar Aslan	Leading role
2018	Börü	Gökçe Demir	Guest appearance
2018–2019	Muhteşem İkili	Nilüfer Can	Leading role
2020	Bay Yanlış	Ezgi İnal	Leading role
2022	Hayaller ve Hayatlar	Dicle Aydın	Leading role
2022–2023	Sipahi	Canan Doğan	Leading role
Web Series
Year	Title	Role	Note
2025	Siyah Bere	Nilgün Esen	Leading role
