= Alper Çağlar =

Turkish film director

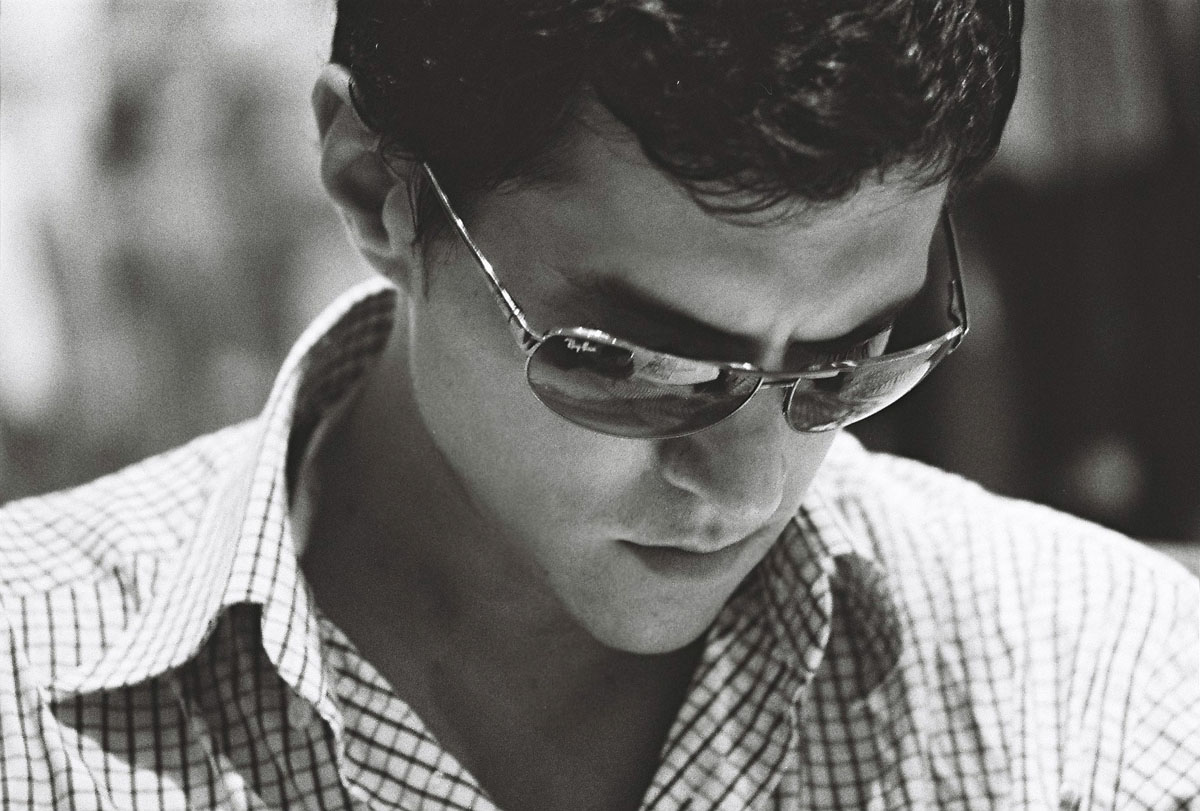
Alper Caglar in 2008

Süleyman Alper Çağlar (born September 1, 1981, in Ankara, Turkey), is Turkish film director, editor and screenwriter.

== Life ==
He was born in Ankara on September 1, 1981, as the second child of his family.

Alper Caglar directed his first documentary film called "Not So Far Away" in Kyrgyzstan in the second year of high school. After he finished his high school education. Alper then received scholarships to study in USA and he studied at the University of Virginia in USA. He completed his studies with Media Relations, Communication and finally Graphic Design Department at Bilkent University.

He is an alumnus of Robert College high school in Istanbul.

== Filmography ==
| Years | Films | Notes |
|---|---|---|
| 2004 | 4 Saat | |
| 2006 | Bukalemun | |
| 2007 | Camgöz: Kan ve Vanilya | |
| 2009 | Büşra | |
| 2012 | The Mountain | |
| 2014 | Panzehir | |
| 2016 | The Mountain 2 | |
| 2018 | Börü (Wolf) | TV series |
| 2018 | Börü (Wolf) | Film |
| 2020 | Börü 2039 | Series |
