= Ece Uslu =

Turkish actress

- Born: 9 September 1974 (age 51); İzmir, Turkey
- Occupation: Actress
- Years active: 1991–present

Ece Uslu (born 9 September 1974) is a Turkish actress. She appeared in more than twenty films since 1991. Her series Kara Melek has record-breaking Turkish Tv series.

== Selected filmography ==
Film
Year	Title	Role	Notes
1999	Güle Güle	Banka Memuresi	Supporting role
2004	Büyü		
2008	Son Ders		
2012	Erik Zamani	Mother	Leading role
2016	Vezir Parmagi	Feride	Leading role
2019	Klaus	Alva	Turkish Dubbing

TV
Year	Title	Role	Notes
1989-90	İz Peşinde	Neriman	Leading role
1997-2000	Kara Melek	Şule	Leading role
2007-2008	Elveda Derken	Lale	Leading role
2010–2011	Kızım Nerede?	Suna Demiray	Leading role
2013–2014	Karagül	Ebru Şamverdi	Leading role
2017	Dayan Yüreğim	Elvan Andaç	Leading role
2019	Sevgili Geçmis	Cahide Esen Karalar	Leading role
2024-2025	Siyah Kalp	Sumru Sansalan	Leading role
