= Sevda Erginci =

Turkish actress (born 1993)

- Born: 3 October 1993 (age 32); Istanbul, Turkey
- Occupation: Actress
- Years active: 2012–present
- Spouse: Efe Saydut (m. 2025)

Sevda Erginci (born 3 October 1993) is a Turkish actress. She has a college degree in acting and degree from the Institute of Music.

== Life and career ==
Sevda Erginci was born on 3 October 1993 in Istanbul, Turkey. Her paternal family is of Arab descent from antique multicultural city Mardin. Her maternal family is of Turkish descent who immigrated from Macedonia.

Erginci began acting at the age of 15, taking part in the play Paki ve Sevgi Çiçekleri for Semaver Company, and then took acting lessons at Kenter Theatre. In 2012, she was cast in Koyu Kırmızı alongside Özgü Namal and Ozan Güven, and in the same year appeared in the historical drama Veda.

She portrayed the character of Ayşe in Karagül for 125 episodes. She made her cinematic debut in 2015 with a role in Uzaklarda Arama, written by Onur Ünlü. After playing main roles in youth series Hayat Bazen Tatlıdır and Ver Elini Aşk, she was cast in Yasak Elma, portraying the character of Zeynep Yılmaz. In 2019, she played the role of İpek Gencer in Sevgili Geçmiş. In 2020, she starred in the historical series Uyanış: Büyük Selçuklu and depicted the character of Turna Hatun.

== Filmography ==
Film
Year	Title	Role	Notes
2015	Uzaklarda Arama	Nazlı	Leading role
2023	Cenazemize Hoş Geldiniz	İrem	Leading role
2024	Gün Çiçeği	Sibel	Leading role
Television
Year	Title	Role	Notes
2012	Koyu Kırmızı	Ayşe	Supporting role
2012	Veda	Lamia	Supporting role
2013–2016	Karagül	Ayşe	Supporting role
2016–2017	Hayat Bazen Tatlıdır	Kara Sevda	Leading role
2017	Ver Elini Aşk	Sultan Ayperi	Leading role
2018–2019, 2022–2023	Yasak Elma	Zeynep Yılmaz	Leading role
2019	Sevgili Geçmiş	İpek Gencer	Leading role
2020–2021	Uyanış: Büyük Selçuklu	Turna Hatun	Leading role
2021–2022	Elkızı	Ezo Bozdağlı	Leading role
2022	Seni Kalbime Sakladım	Zeynep	Leading role
2024	Kül Masalı	Özge Günay	Leading role

== Awards ==
- İKÜ Career Honorary Awards / Best New Actress of the Year
- Medipol İK Business Awards / Best Debut by an Actress
