= List of Arka Sıradakiler characters =

Arka Siradakiler Characters

Along with the Büyük Zafer crew, Arka Sıradakiler includes a large array of characters: students, teachers, families, friends, and fictional characters. The main characters, teacher Kemal and the crew, are listed first; all other characters are listed unordered. Only main, supporting, and recurring characters are listed.

== Characters ==
- Bülent Emin Yarar as Kemal (episodes: 2-124/Season: 1-4), an idealist teacher whose purpose is to recover the students who have problems. He tries to communicate with students. He cares about his students more than himself. He has dedicated his life to performing his duty up to his best and helping his students to be healthy, productive individuals. After the arc of Zehra's being kidnapped, he transferred to another school according to Arka Sıradakiler. He continued his career as a teacher in Öğretmen Kemal TV series.
- Bülent Çetinaslan as Oktay (episodes: 1-193.../Season: 1-6..), a student who is exposed to violence by his father. He reflects this violence to things around him. His friends regard him as a leader. He tries to create the justice he can't find in his life. He is brave enough to easily take great risks and he does anything to help and protect his friends. In the 160th episode, Pınar caused his death along with his wife, Gamze.
- Sinem Öztürk as Gamze, Oktay's girlfriend (episodes: 1-193../ Season: 1-6..). She doesn't get herself involved in gang affairs. Her family barely pays any attention to her so she's unhappy at home and when her boyfriend Oktay puts himself into trouble at school she loses her temper. She's worried about Oktay and his friends. Her greatest aspiration is a calm, happy family. In the 160th episode, Pınar caused her death along with her husband, Oktay.
- Barış Atay as Saffet (episodes: 1-160/Season: 1-4), one of the former students of Büyük Zafer High School. He was kicked out of school after he had bashed one of his teachers up with his friends. He was also left in an orphanage at a very early age. He plays the vagabond with his friends around the school. While he had maintained his territory before appearance of Oktay and his gang, he later waged war on them for the control of the area. He sneaky misses his school years. He is accepted to the school again in further episodes. In the fourth and last season, he gives up on Gamze finally and has an affair with Zehra. Their relationship furthers and they finally fall in love with each other. Their love ends under a train, after Zehra marries her rapist, Sedat, and then kills him. Zehra and Saffet end their lives together unfortunately.
- Fırat Çöloğlu as İbo (episodes: 1-193/Season: 1-6), one of Oktay's closest mates, a funny guy. As his father left them a long time ago, he is living alone with his mother. His father is an alcoholic and although he shares everything with his friends, he is ashamed of it. He has never known his father. His greatest aspiration is to save himself and his mother by striking it rich the easy way. In further episodes, his father returns. In the fourth and last season, he loses the love of his life: Sibel. Then a woman, resembling her, named Şebnem becomes his lover.
- Deniz Sarıbaş as Sibel (episodes: 1-150/Season: 1-4), the mysterious girl of Arka Sıradakiler. She's bothered with neither the lessons nor the things happening around the school. She has a great secret that she hides from everyone. She prostitutes herself. She has accepted this way of making life which she had to begin because of a plaguesome man. She thinks she can never save herself. Her greatest fear is that her secret reveals. She saves herself and starts going out with İbo in further episodes. But her stalker kills her, driving his boyfriend, İbo to almost lose his mind.
- Deniz Sarıbaş as Şebnem (episodes: 155-160/Season: 4), After Sibel dies in episode 150, Deniz Sarıbaş reappears in episode 155 as Şebnem.
- Temmuz Karikutal as Yadigar (episodes: 1-62;86-154/Season 1- 2½;3-4), a close friend of Oktay. A secretive, trustworthy guy. Although he's rather strict with his friends, he gets unexpectedly easygoing when the case is the girl he loves. He is so loyal to his friends that he can do any sacrifice for them. As keen as mustard on his friends, he's tough, humorous, cheerful, witty. Due to an unfortunate accident, he loses his ability to walk, and he runs away, hiding this secret from his closest friends. When he returns, he wins back the advances of the girl he likes: Eda. Meanwhile, he tries to walk again, with the help of Buket's mother.
- Sevda Dalgıç as Özge (episodes: 1-160/Season 1-6), a rebel girl determined not to live the rage of puberty in herself. She never holds back from reacting to situations she hates. Pessimistically, she believes she is unlucky. Instead of working to change his bad luck to save herself, she chooses to merely rebelling to this situation and demonstrating her response by anger and violence. In the fourth and last season, she finally returned Pamuk's love. On the 160th episode she and her boyfriend died, due to Şebnem.
- Pelin Akil as Zehra (episodes: 46-160/Season: 2-4), Kemal's niece. She can't easily accommodate herself to the environment of Büyük Zafer High School after a childhood of freedom in the Netherlands. She sometimes steals to seek adventure and excitement. She doesn't hesitate to lie to reach her aim. Her only passion in life is music and she can easily get bored of anything else. Whimsey, moody, unreliable, she is so fond of her freedom that anything can be expected from her at any moment. Her attitude changes after Sedat's rape. After this incident she was kidnapped and forced for prostitution. As she refused, she was made addicted to heroine. She was saved by Ali and this made her fall in love with him. But this was a misunderstanding, as revealed with a kiss shared with Ali's best friend, Saffet. She chose Saffet, but her stalker Sedat and Ali and Saffet's another friend Memo prevented their happiness. So she decided to marry Sedat, confusing Ali and Saffet. Her intention was to kill him on their wedding day, which she did. After that, having nowhere to go, she arrived at the train station to commit suicide. Saffet joined her and the two lovers ended their lives together.
- Aytaç Er as Pamuk İlhan (episodes: 1-160/Season: 1-4). His friends nicknamed him Pamuk (Cotton) due to his softness. He wants to be a powerful and an appreciated person. He's happy with Oktay and his gang. His biggest dream is some day becoming a brave leader like Oktay. He's in love with Özge. Despite her rebuffs, he never gives up. And he succeeds. She returns his feelings but soon, they die due to Şebnem.
- Engin Yavaş as Rıza (episodes: 1-160/Season: 1-4), a son of a rather crowded family. His brain is useful with making money rather than lessons. As his family doesn't compensate any of his needs, he has learnt to take care of himself by working here and there since his childhood. His family isn't bad but because of their moral and material problems, they're in no condition to take care of him. While he was growing up, Rıza learnt that life is a game with ruthless rules and that the only way of winning in this game is cheating. He puts away cheats, lies and cunning when the matter is his friends. In the fourth and last season, he went to the military. He's among the few characters that survived.
- Demir Kuvvetli as Dizdar (episodes: 1-116/Season: 1-3), also called Shrek. He is the eldest of four siblings in a low-income family. He is not involved much in his lessons but he has a sharp mathematical intelligence. Rather impassively, he ignores his problems most of the time. He does anything for his friends. The greatest thing he is intolerant of is starvation. He nearly can't even think when he is hungry. On the 116th episode, he died at the hands of Kerem.
- Barış Büktel as Ali (episodes: 1-160/Season: 1-4). Just like Saffet and Memo, he has found himself in orphanage when he's too little. With an orphan child's feeling of loneliness, he has developed a passion for reading and has improved himself as he read. He has no one in his life but Saffet, Memo and Koray. He is a clever, thoughtful, sensible, determined and hardworking guy. He likes reading more than studying. In the third season, he helped his teacher find Zehra. After that, he did fall in love with her. But her betrayal made him a revenger. He faked his death thanks to Sedat and disturbed Zehra and Saffet's happiness. Then it was revealed that he was still alive and he was the one who stole Saffet's money. After he came back, he forced Zehra to make her decision. As she couldn't ruin the friendship of Ali and Saffet, she said she'd go away, which she did. She married Sedat and surprised the two friends. But her intention was to kill him, which she did. After that, Saffet was the one to join her suicide, so Ali survived.
- Caner Erdem as Memo (episodes: 1-160/Season: 1-4), Saffet and Ali's childhood friend. He has never known his parents. He was left to Çocuk Esirgeme Kurumu (Society for the Protection of Children) while he was only 3. His greatest aspiration is finding his parents. He's lazy, reliable, loyal, sensitive, fond of his comfort and stomach. There is nothing he can't do for Ali, Saffet and Koray. And this made him hate Zehra, as she kind of ruined Ali and Saffet's friendship. He forced her to make her decision, but Zehra chose to go away. Zehra decided to marry her stalker Sedat, but her intention was to kill him on their wedding day, which she did. After that, Saffet joined a Zehra who wanted to kill herself. As the two forbidden lovers took their lives, Memo survived along with Ali.
- Merve Erdoğan as Eda (episodes: 1-160/Season: 1-4), a girl who has found herself in a world she had never been aware of after the bankruptcy of his wealthy father's company. Since she had to change her school and her friends together with her entire life, she is unhappy. She starts to love her friends at her new school as she gets to know them better. In the first season, she had a stalker, nicknamed Mavi Sakal (meaning Blue Beard). The students -also the audience- suspected her lovers: Ali and Yadigar, and her rival: Aslım. But Mavi Sakal was none of those. He was Barış, who wanted to dedicate a book to his one and only love: Gamze. As he wanted to impress his former lover, he wanted a much realistic novel, so he kidnapped Eda. He watched her lose her mind, but Eda broke free. Then Barış pretended to save her. Eda treated him like a knight then, and Barış, as a part of his plan, pretended to be his boyfriend. He accused Ali of being Mavi Sakal and Ali had to escape from the police. But as Barış went more and more mad, he made a mistake: He didn't burn the cancelled page of his novel, he casually put it in a bin. Ali took the paper out of the bin and read it. He understood Barış's plan and he tried to steal his novel. Barış decided to kill Ali, but his novel fell into a fire, and he burned his face trying to save it. As Ali ran away, he told the police that Ali burned his face. But the police and Kemal half believed Barış, as they hadn't listened to Ali yet. They researched Barış's room, and Kemal hid the CD that he found from the police. He watched it and saw that it was just a CD recorded by Barış for the love of Eda, so he gave it to Eda. Eda watched it and realized a green sweatshirt behind Barış, which belonged to Mavi Sakal. She, with the help of the police, convinced Barış that she'd take her own revenge from Ali, by burning him. As Barış's face was disfigured, and as he'd lost his own father in a fire, he didn't want Ali to be burned and confessed to be Mavi Sakal. After this confession, Eda was temporarily relieved. Then, Barış came back to Büyük Zafer for revenge, he shot Eda in the arm. She, nevertheless, participated in the exam and attended university. She met Sibel there and helped her have a healthy relationship with İbo. But in the fourth and last season, she crushed on İbo, finally letting go of her feelings for Barış, Ali, and Yadigar altogether. She confessed it, but İbo was in love with Şebnem. In the last episode of the series, she died due to Şebnem, along with Pamuk and Özge.
- Tuncer Öz as Barış (episodes: 1-78/Season: 1-2). Although he's successful at school, he works as a night shift taxi driver as the financial condition of his family bad. He wants to be an author in the future. He dreams himself writing true life stories of his friends. Rather than joining them, he usually prefers to observe his friends. He's enduring against the tough life he carries on together with his mother, his elder sister and his grandmother but he's sorry for his family. He knows that he has to be successful in order not to allow them to suffer. All these lead him to become Mavi Sakal, and he kidnaps Eda. He watches her lose her mind, and he writes a novel of this. For his novel, he needs someone to put the blame on. He chooses Ali. Ali, with the clue that he found in Barış's notebook, is certain that Mavi Sakal is Barış. He steals his notebook, and Barış, wanting to save his novel, decides to kill Ali. The two fight, leading the novel to fall into a fire. Barış tries to save it, burning his own face, but he's able to tell the police that Ali burned it, because Ali's gone away. After Barış recovers, he tries to convince Eda not to take her revenge. But Eda's plans were just a game of the police, they were trying to make Barış confess, which he did. He was put in an asylum and he planned an attack on Büyük Zafer. In the second season's finale, he took hostages. They were Gamze, the one and only love of his life, her best friend Sanem, the bad girl of the class Zehra, the class clown Pamuk, the tomboy of the class Özge, and the angry bird İbo. Barış wanted Gamze to choose one of them, so that he can kill him/her. Gamze said, "Kill me." Barış said, "This is the right answer." A day passed and they needed food. He sent Gamze outside. Oktay, seeing his girlfriend, entered the classroom by force and Barış pointed at İbo, with the intention of killing him. Zehra sacrificed herself for İbo, and Barış, seeing the greatness of her love, decided to spare the others, and killed himself.
- Gülşah Küçükyıldız as Sanem (episodes: 1-160/Season: 1-4). She has fallen in love with the son of a wealthy businessman. She had impregnated from him and then gave birth to a baby girl. Before the birth of baby, she'd got afraid of her father's argumentations and decided to flee with her mother. She's sorry for disappointing her father but she thinks she hadn't any other solution. Becoming a mother has changed Sanem a lot. She used to be quite enjoyable and cheerful but now she's conservative and responsible to his child. She's among the few characters that survived.
- Aslı Bankoğlu as Aslım (episodes: 1-78/Season: 1-2). She used to be lively and cheerful but her friends' making fun of her being overweight has made her sink into depression. Her greatest dream is becoming a girl whom Yadigar might like. But Yadigar disappeared suddenly and she ceased rivalry with Eda. She was targeted by the bad girl of the class, Zehra. She, nevertheless, studied hard and attended a university.
- İlkin Tüfekçi as Selin (episodes: 31-83/ Season: 1½-3¼). As a result of the trauma she took upon the death of her father while she was 12, she has lost her speech. In further episodes, she gains her speech back with the impact of the night at which Gamze has been shot. Selin gets along well with her friends, she's indulgent and emotional. She likes watching films and chatting with her friends. When her mother married for the second time, she has begun to live with her grandmother.
- Yağmur Berfo Özgenç as İrem (episodes: 1-78/Season: 1-2). She's a daughter of a middle-class family. She has a sister whom she always quarrels with. She's gossipy, bitchy, poisonous and jealous. Her closest friends are Aslım and Eda. However, she sometimes gets jealous of Eda and tries to destroy the friendship between her and Aslım. Nevertheless, as she's an enjoyable girl, her friends never get bored with her. She loves making fun of boys. She never completely trusts to someone. She doesn't value love much. She plays with the feelings of Fırat. Then, Fırat directs his interest to Selin. This leads İrem not to believe Selin can't talk. She throws dirt at Selin. As she can't defend herself, İrem is convinced that she can't really talk. After Selin regains her speech, she's great friends with her. After Zehra arrived at Büyük Zafer, İrem kind of becomes the beta bitch in the class. She follows Zehra and mistreats Aslım. Then she graduates and nothing's heard from İrem again.
- Osman Büyükercan as Cahit (episodes: 1-193../Season: 1-6..), Oktay's elder brother. He has moved to his own house a couple of years ago as he couldn't get along with his father, Nihat. He has chosen to work instead of attending a university. He has had intercourse with the wife of the businessman. His dearest wish is preventing Oktay from doing the same mistakes and making him finish the school to save himself. After he sees the real face of his lover, he ends his relationship with her and starts a relationship with Barış's sister, Tuğba. But after Barış's attack on Büyük Zafer, their relationship ends unfortunately. He has a brief romance with a much younger girl, Güneş then. But then Güneş leaves him too.
- Mehmet Ulay as Nihat (episodes: 1-122../Season: 1-4..), Oktay and Cahit's father. His father was a disciplined officer. He raised Nihat and his brothers with strict rules and violence. Since Nihat was the most mischievous of his brothers, he had been occasionally exposed to a level of violence which could be accounted of torment. He couldn't lead a life as his father wanted. When he couldn't join the army either, he disappointed his father more and eventually was disowned by him.
- Engin Yüksel as Zafer (episodes: 1-121/Season: 1-4), a prim, hung-up, egotistical maths teacher who lines up with violence in education of students. He is also the vice-principal of the school. He can do anything to be obeyed. He's as concerned with the students as Kemal does but instead of recovering them, he tries to destroy them, thrusting them aside not to allow them to disorder the system.
- Şeniz Kurultay as Mine (episodes: 1-78/Season: 1-2), the English teacher. She has a timid, starry-eyed nature. She can easily managed by students. She loves Kemal. She can't confess her feelings due to Zehra's bullying.
- Emin Gümüşkaya as Hulusi (episodes: 1-121/Season: 1-3), the frustrated, careless, lazy principal. He's not furious against students but he doesn't hold in a bit of an esteem for them either. Rather than trying to perform his duties, he just looks forward to his next payday.
- Feriha Eyüboğlu as Leyla (episodes: 1-121../Season: 1-4.), the history teacher. She loves her job and her students a lot. She's met with incidents in Büyük Zafer High School that she didn't see before. In the course of time she has begun to be afraid of troublesome students like other teachers. She wants students to put themselves in order immediately.
- Tahsin Taşkın as Rifo (episodes: 1-.../Season: 1-...), canteen operator of Büyük Zafer High School. He came from Rize to Istanbul years ago. Rifo gained his favor with his friendly personality. He cares for problems of the students, joins in their jokes, treats them as a big brother.
- Sılay Ünal as Nazan (episodes: 39-64/Season: 1¾-2½), a childhood friend of Sibel's. She works as a nurse. She's jealous, deceitful, two faced, ill intentioned and obsessive. Her only aim is to soil Sibel's love for İbo and to break them up. She's a lonely girl, whom no one likes and she has some psychological problems. She helps Kerem but Kerem betrays her and she ends up in prison.
- Esin Civangil as Buket (episodes: 42-78/Season: 2), the only daughter of a wealthy family. She's studying in a private school. Doing nothing but gossiping and shopping with her wealthy friends sometimes suffocates her. She has an emotional, understanding, cheerful, tender, enjoyable and intimate personality. Her meeting with Oktay turns into a milestone for her. When she falls in love with Oktay, she gets into an environment different from she was in. She lies to Oktay about being pregnant. After her mother tells Oktay the truth, Oktay doesn't say "I do" on their wedding day. Ashamed Buket, wants to end her life but she wants to kill Kerem also. But she fails. In other words, she dies but Kerem survives, lacking an eye.
- Gürbey İleri as Kerem (episodes: 46-145/Season: 2-4), spoilt son of a rich family. He's at the same school with Buket. He has started a gang with some of his school mates and has taken the head of this gang. He is ambitious, confident, vying, aggressive and foolhardy. While he's so used to get everything he wants easily, he can't put up with the fact that Buket has left him. His only purpose is taking Buket back from Oktay. On the 145th episode he died at the hands of Menderes.
- Alp Çoker as Tamer (episodes: 46-102../Season: 2-3..), Kerem's closest school mate and right-hand man. He's used as a pawn by Kerem. He can easily change his mind. He's somewhat unsuspicious, pleasure seeking, irresponsible and unreliable. Because he admires Kerem and is afraid of losing his friendship, he can do anything. However, if he runs across someone who's more enjoyable than Kerem, he might leave him high and dry. He's a superficial character, who builds his friendships on fun rather than trust. But Özge changes him. His love game with Özge becomes something more important. Kerem beats up Özge and tells her Tamer is away with his girlfriend. Özge believes Kerem. Then, Tamer tries to tell Özge the truth, but she doesn't listen to him. After the rejection of Özge, Tamer gains back his jerk jock personality. He kind of bullies Rıza in the military.

== See also ==
- Fox (Turkey)
