= 7 Numara =

Turkish television series

- Also known as: Number Seven
- Genre: Sitcom
- Written by: Nuray Uslu; Volkan Girgin; Ayça Mutlugil; Oya Yüce
- Directed by: Haluk Bener (1–6); Sadullah Celen (7–92)
- Starring: Şebnem Sönmez; Engin Alkan; Tuba Erdem; Okan Selvi; Ayça Mutlugil; Nuray Uslu; Gülden Güney; Volkan Girgin and others
- Composer: Serdar Kalafatoğlu
- Country of origin: Turkey
- Original language: Turkish
- No. of seasons: 3
- No. of episodes: 92

Production
- Producer: Oya Yüce
- Production locations: Kandilli, Üsküdar (1–13); Arnavutköy, Beşiktaş (14–92)
- Running time: 45 min.
- Production company: Fora Film

Original release
- Network: TRT 1
- Release: October 9, 2000 – June 23, 2003

Yedi Numara (Number Seven) is a Turkish sitcom that aired on TRT 1 from October 9, 2000, to June 23, 2003, lasting three seasons. With an ensemble cast starring Şebnem Sönmez, Engin Alkan, Tuba Erdem, Okan Selvi, Ayça Mutlugil, Nuray Uslu, Gülden Güney and Volkan Girgin, the show revolves around a couple with no kids, four city girls and three country boys who live in Istanbul.

The series concluded with its 75th episode aired in June 2002. However, due to high demand and requests received by TRT during the summer of 2002, the decision was made to continue. Despite receiving high ratings on its airing days, the show came to an end with its 92nd episode broadcast on June 23, 2003. Yedi Numara, one of the popular TV shows in Turkey during the 2000s, is known for being one of the most frequently replayed series in Turkish TV history.

The storyline involves four girlfriends renting Vahit’s building, but conflicts arise when Vahit’s nephews move into the lower floor. The storyline of the series takes place in Istanbul. Vahit and Zeliha Ballıoğlu's two-story wooden building is located in Kandilli, Üsküdar. This building was used in episodes 1–13 of the series. The upper floor of the building is rented by four girlfriends, while the lower floor houses three country boys. After the 13th episode, the series started to be filmed in a four-story building located in Arnavutköy, Beşiktaş. The episodes from the 14th to the finale were shot in this new location. Some of the exterior shots of the series were taken along the Beşiktaş district and nearby locations. Additionally, some episodes of the series were filmed outside the city.

== Plot ==
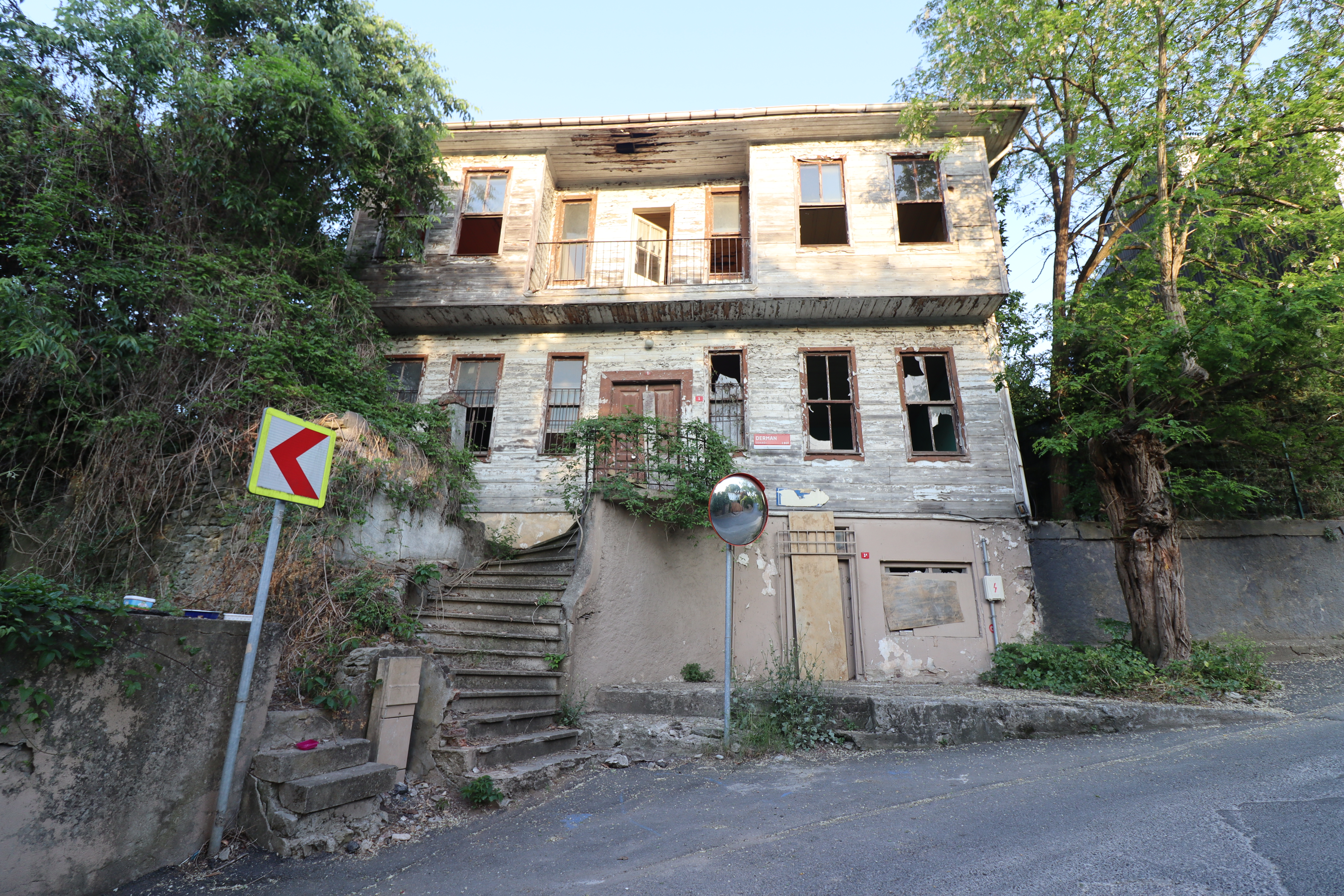
The building where the first 13 episodes of "Yedi Numara" were filmed.

Armağan, Ayten, Cansu, and Rüya are four friends who study at the same university, and their families live in different cities. They decide to rent a house together because they don't feel comfortable in the dormitory. However, either they lack the financial means or landlords don't rent their houses to students. Eventually, they find out that the two-story wooden building with the number 7 is available for rent. This building belongs to Vahit and Zeliha, a couple who, despite being unable to have children, are very fond of each other. The four friends rent the upper floor of this wooden building. However, grocer Vahit's rural nephews, Recep, Haydar and Satılmış, move to the lower floor of the same building in Istanbul. While Recep, Haydar and Satılmış settled on the lower floor, they filled the house with the energy of contrasting worlds, thus establishing a lively and cheerful scene for cohabitation.

The storyline revolved around the humorous relationships among city girls, country boys, and the eccentric householders. Satılmış (Ruhi Sarı) left the series by the 13th episode, and in the 22nd episode, the character Sabit, played by Olgun Şimşek, joined as Recep's brother, arriving in Istanbul with the dream of becoming a "male actor."

== Cast and characters ==
The series featured various actors as guest stars, including Demet Evgar, Gürkan Uygun, Binnur Kaya, Ali Atay, İlker Ayrık, Bülent İnal, Bülent Alkış, Mustafa Üstündağ, Engin Hepileri, Asuman Dabak, Yurdaer Okur, Şeyla Halis, Serdar Orçin, Ahu Türkpençe, Arda Öziri, Arda Kural, and Beyazıt Öztürk, among others.

=== Main cast ===
- Şebnem Sönmez as Zeliha Ballıoğlu:

Zeliha, Vahit’s wife, embraces her maternal instincts caring for "rams" and "chicks," yet her anxious nature leads to vivid disaster scenarios in moments of panic.

- Engin Alkan as Vahit Ballıoğlu:

In the series, Vahit, Zeliha's husband, starts as a grocer and later opens a Manti and Cheburek restaurant.

- Tuba Erdem as Armağan Erdem:

She studies Environmental Engineering at Yıldız Technical University, and she is from Bursa. She’s a logical, rule-oriented, disciplined individual who lost her parents as a child and was raised by her brothers and uncles. In the upcoming episodes, she falls in love with Haydar.

- Ayça Mutlugil as Ayten Mutlugil:

She studies Environmental Engineering at Yıldız Technical University, and she is from Ankara. She is a flirtatious individual who values beauty and personal care.

- Nuray Uslu as Rüya Uslu:

She studies Environmental Engineering at Yıldız Technical University, and she is from İzmir. She is easily scared, and when frightened she cries. She can quickly fall into a state of depression.

- Gülden Güney as Cansu Güney:

She studies Environmental Engineering at Yıldız Technical University, and she is from Antalya. She is the prankster of the house.

- Volkan Girgin as Recep Ballıoğlu:

He is Vahit's nephew and Haydar's cousin. He has come to Istanbul for university. He studies in the Geodesy and Photogrammetry Engineering department but can't quite remember the name of his major. He is engaged to Meryem.

- Okan Selvi as Haydar Ballıoğlu:

He is Vahit's nephew and Recep's cousin. He is a mathematical genius and attributes his brilliance to onions. He becomes an assistant while in preparatory class. He is in love with Armağan.

=== Supporting ===
- Ruhi Sarı as Satılmış Ballıoğlu
- Olgun Şimşek as Sabit Ballıoğlu
- Sedef Pehlivanoğlu as Meryem
- Özlem Türkad as Asiye
- Aşkın Şenol as Berat Çolağangiller
- Çağlar Çorumlu as Yusuf Güdük
- Cenk Tunalı as Deniz
- Taner Ertürkler as Evren
- Damla Özen as Fidan
- Dikmen Seymen as Behiye
- Emin Olcay as Doktor Veli Baba

== Release ==
Season	Running date & time	Season start	Season final	Running episode numbers	Episode interval	Season year	TV channel
Season 1	Monday 22.00	October 9, 2000	July 16, 2001	39	1–39	2000–2001	TRT 1
Season 2	Monday 21.45	August 27, 2001	June 24, 2002 (1st finale)	36	40–75	2001–2002	TRT 1
Season 3	Monday 20.50	March 10, 2003	June 23, 2003 (2nd finale)	17	76–92	2003	TRT 1
