= Sevda =

Sevda is a Turkish given name. In Turkish, it means "love." Notable people with the name include:

- Sevda Alakbarzadeh (born 1977), Azerbaijani singer
- Sevda Altunoluk (born 1994), Turkish goalball player
- Sevda Alizadeh (born 1987), Iranian-Dutch singer
- Sevda Dalgıç (born 1984), Turkish film and stage actress
- Sevda Erginci (born 1993), Turkish actress
- Sevda Kılınç Çırakoğlu, Turkish para-athlete
- Sevda Shishmanova, Bulgarian journalist and reporter
- Sevda Sevan (1945–2009), Armenian-Bulgarian writer and diplomat
