= Pressure Drop =

Pressure Drop may refer to:

- "Pressure Drop" (song), by Toots & the Maytals, covered by many others
- Pressure Drop (album), a 1975 album by Robert Palmer
- Pressure Drop, a 2010 album by Billy Bragg
- Pressure Drop (band), an English electronic music duo
- DSSV Pressure Drop, the mother ship for the submersible Limiting Factor
- Pressure Drop, a 1995 video game re-released as Under Pressure and Pressure Drop

== See also ==
- Pressure drop, in pressure measurement
