= Kılınç =

Kılınç is a Turkish name and surname that means "sword". It may refer to:

- David Kılınç (born 1992), Swiss footballer of Turkish descent
- Emre Kılınç (born 1994), Turkish footballer
- Koray Kılınç (born 2000), Turkish footballer
- Tuncer Kılınç (born 1938), Turkish general

== See also ==
- Sevda Kılınç Çırakoğlu (born 1993), Turkish female para athlete
- Sarsılmaz Kılınç 2000, a semi-automatic pistol
