= Gülcan Arslan =

Turkish actress

- Born: 1 May 1986 (age 39); Karasu, Turkey
- Occupation: Actress
- Years active: 2004–present

Gülcan Arslan (born 1 May 1986) is a Turkish actress.

== Early life ==
Gülcan Arslan was born on 1 May 1986 in Karasu, Turkey. She studied theatre at Sadri Alışık Cultural Center before appearing in various plays and commercials.

== Career ==
Arslan made her debut with a role on the TRT1 series Sardunya Sokak. In 2008, she was cast in youth series Sınıf and in the same year appeared on Kanal D's Hepimiz Birimiz İçin. Later in the same year she got a role on ATV's Gurbet Kuşları. In 2009, she joined the cast of Kafkas. In 2010, she had a recurring role on Show TV's Kahramanlar.

Arslan had her first leading role in the period series Her Şeye Rağmen in 2011 alongside Can Nergis. In 2012, she was among the main cast of Star TV's Bir Çocuk Sevdim for 39 episodes alongside Hakan Kurtaş. In the following year, she became a regular with Can Nergis in the 8th season of Arka Sokaklar, portraying Commissioner Leyla Candaş.

In 2014, she had the leading role alongside Seçkin Özdemir in the series Günahkar as Saliha. In 2017, she shared the leading role with Engin Akyürek and Fahriye Evcen on the ATV series Ölene Kadar, playing the role of Beril. In 2021, she had a recurring role in the drama series Doğduğun Ev Kaderindir.

She subsequently portrayed Fahriye Sultan for 14 episodes in the historical drama series Muhteşem Yüzyıl: Kösem. She played in historical series Barbaroslar: Akdeniz'in Kılıcı on based life of Hayreddin Barbarossa.

== Filmography ==
Year	Title	Role	Type	Notes
2007	Sardunya Sokak	Canan	TV series	Supporting role
2008	Hepimiz Birimiz İçin	Mine Pekmezci	TV series	Supporting role
2008	Sınıf	Zehra	TV series	Supporting role
2008	Gurbet Kuşları	-	TV series	Supporting role
2009	Kafkas	-	TV series	Supporting role
2009	Kahramanlar	Figen	TV series	Supporting role
2011	Entelköy Efeköy'e Karşı	-	Film	Supporting role
2011	Herşeye Rağmen	Leyla Açıkalın	TV series	Leading role
2011	Bir Çocuk Sevdim	Mine	TV series	Leading role
2013	Arka Sokaklar	Leyla Candaş	TV series	Supporting role
2014	Günahkar	Saliha Tezhanlı	TV series	Leading role
2015–2016	Muhteşem Yüzyıl: Kösem	Fahriye Sultan	TV series	Supporting role
2017	Ölene Kadar	Beril Karalı	TV series	Leading role
2019	Zengin ve Yoksul	Nihal Taştan	TV series	Supporting role
2021	Doğduğun Ev Kaderindir	Nesrin / Gülbin Göksu	TV series	Supporting role
2021	Barbaroslar: Akdeniz'in Kılıcı	Despina	TV series	Leading role
2024	Kimler Geldi, Kimler Geçti	Defne	TV series	Supporting role
