= Ulaş Tuna Astepe =

Turkish actor (born 1988)

- Born: 5 May 1988 (age 38); İzmit, Turkey
- Occupation: Actor
- Years active: 2008–present

Ulaş Tuna Astepe (born 5 May 1988) is a Turkish actor.

== Biography ==
Ulaş Tuna Astepe was born on 5 May 1988 in İzmit. He finished his elementary and secondary education in İzmit, and then enrolled in Istanbul High School.

In 2008, Astepe worked as a costume assistant on the set of The Ottoman Republic, after which he appeared in several plays and TV series. He portrayed the character of Orhan in the TV series Karadayı, Mustafa in Analar ve Anneler dizisinde, Alaz in Rüya, and Tahir in Sen Anlat Karadeniz.

Astepe also had a role in the plays Bayrak and Babamın Cesetleri directed by Berkun Oya, and the Leaves of Glass which was brought on stage in Turkey by Sami Berat Marçalı.

He has also had roles in a number of short movies, as well as Emre Yeksan's feature film Körfez, in which he played the character of Selim.

Between 2021 and 2022, he shared the lead role with Engin Altan Düzyatan, Yetkin Dikinciler and Pelin Akil in the historical epic drama Barbaroslar.

Since 2025, Astepe is leading TRT 1's Taşacak Bu Deniz alongside actress Deniz Baysal.

== Filmography ==
=== TV series ===
Year	Title	Role	Notes
2012–2015	Karadayı	Orhan Kara	Supporting role
2015	Analar ve Anneler	Mustafa	Supporting role
2017	Rüya	Alaz Noyan	Leading role
2018–2019	Sen Anlat Karadeniz	Tahir Kaleli	Leading role
2021–2022	Barbaroslar: Akdeniz'in Kılıcı	Hayreddin Barbarossa	Leading role
2022	Hayat Bugün	Barış Güvener	Leading role
2024	İlk ve Son	Cihan Alaca	Leading role
2025	Çift Kişilik Oda	Kaan Tunca	Leading role
2025–present	Taşacak Bu Deniz	Adil Koçari	Leading role

=== Film ===
Year	Title	Role	Notes
2016	Körfez	Selim	Leading role

=== Short film ===
Year	Title	Role	Notes
2010	Üniversiteli		Supporting role
2013	Zayiat	Mete	Supporting role
2013	Meşakkat ve Karısı		Supporting role
2015	Balık Havuzu		Supporting role
2020	Sarı, Siyam, Kanocular ve Ev Sahibi		Leading role

== Theatre ==
Year	Title	Role	Notes
2011	Bayrak		
2012	Leaves of Glass	Barry	
2013	Babamın Cesetleri	Doctor	
