= Have You Ever Seen Fireflies? =

- Turkish: Sen Hiç Ateşböceği Gördün mü?
- Directed by: Andaç Haznedaroğlu
- Written by: Yılmaz Erdoğan
- Starring: Yılmaz Erdoğan; Ecem Erkek; Engin Alkan
- Production company: BKM
- Distributed by: Netflix
- Release date: April 9, 2021
- Running time: 113 minutes
- Country: Turkey
- Language: Turkish

Have You Ever Seen Fireflies? (Turkish: Sen Hiç Ateşböceği Gördün mü?) is a play written by Yılmaz Erdoğan. A feature film based on the play was released in 2021 via Netflix, directed by Andaç Haznedaroglu and starring Yılmaz Erdoğan, Ecem Erkek and Engin Alkan.

== Production ==
Erdoğan began writing the play while he was serving at the Air Force Academy. It was performed for the first time on 23 January 1999 at the Beşiktaş Cultural Center in Istanbul. Erdoğan was given a day's leave to attend the premiere.

The play had a cast of 17 people and was released with the sponsorship of Telsim. During its run in Istanbul it was staged 97 times between 23 January 1999 and 23 May 1999. Later that same year during June, the play was performed in Bursa, Denizli, Antalya, Isparta, Adana, Tarsus, Mersin and Cyprus, as well as Anatolia. The following year the production went on a temporary hiatus due to the pregnancy of actor Demet Akbağ and by November, the play had been staged a total of 505 times. In August 2002 Erdoğan stated that the play had been viewed by 1 million people.

=== Original cast ===
- Yılmaz Erdoğan
- Demet Akbağ
- Zerrin Sümer
- Sinan Bengier
- Salih Kalyon
- Altan Erkekli
- Bican Günalan
- Gürdal Tosun
- Figen Evren
- Neslihan Yeldan
- Caner Alkaya
- Deniz Özerman
- Şebnem Sönmez // Binnur Kaya
- Vural Çelik

== Awards ==
- 3rd Afife Theatre Awards
  - Cevat Fehmi Başkut Special Award: Yılmaz Erdoğan
  - Most Successful Actress in a Musical or Comedy: Demet Akbağ
  - Most Successful Supporting ACtress: Şebnem Sönmez
  - Most Successful Theatre Score: Metin Kalender
- Avni Dilligil Theatre Awards
  - Best Production: Sen Hiç Ateşböceği Gördün mü?
  - Most Successful Playwright: Yılmaz Erdoğan
  - Most Successful Supporting Actress: Zerrin Sümer
  - Most Successful Theatre Score: Metin Kalender

== Film adaptation ==
A film adaptation of the play was released on April 9, 2021, on Netflix. It starred Yılmaz Erdoğan as Patron and also featured Ecem Erkek and Merve Dizdar. Erdoğan had previously spoken about his desire to create a feature film adaptation as early as 2009.

=== Cast and characters ===
Actor/actress	Role
Ecem Erkek	Gülseren
Yılmaz Erdoğan	Somer Yoğurtçuoğlu
Engin Alkan	Nazif
Devrim Yakut	İclal
Merve Dizdar	İzzet
Ushan Çakır	Hazım
Bülent Çolak	Kürşat
Bora Akkaş	Veli
Atakan Çelik	Muhabir Sedat
Ilgaz Kaya	Nuran
Fatih Özkan	Servet
Özlem Tokaslan	Sürme
Rıza Akın	Okul Müdürü
Ahmet Rıfat Şungar	Dündar
Caner Alkaya	Hurşit Hoca
Celal Tak	Fotoğrafçı
Asuman Dabak	Maytap
Ülkü Duru	
Sinan Bengier	Kâfur
Beyti Engin	Tevgir Hoca
