= Hakan Kurtaş =

Turkish actor (born 1988)

- Born: 7 September 1988 (age 37); İzmir, Turkey
- Education: Mimar Sinan Fine Arts University State Conservatory
- Occupations: Actor, musician, composer
- Years active: 2010–present
- Height: 1.93 m (6 ft 4 in)

Hakan Kurtaş (born 7 September 1988) is a Turkish actor, musician and composer.

== Early life ==
After completing his education at Bursa Anatolian High School, Kurtaş graduated from Mimar Sinan Fine Arts University State Conservatory Theatre Department. His mother is an economist and his father is a pediatrician. His mother graduated with a degree in economics when he was 3 years old, and then took the final exams again and graduated as an art teacher. He has two younger brothers. Before college, he played basketball in professional clubs. He drew cartoons and made music in his free time. His cartoons were published in Leman and Uykusuz humor and cartoon magazines for a while.

== Career ==
Kurtaş became interested in theatre while in middle school but decided to become an actor in high school. In 2010, he joined the DOT theatre and was cast in the play Punk Rock. He made his television debut in ATV's series Ezel, portraying the character of "Can Uçar" in the final episode. He had his breakthrough with Kanal D's Bir Çocuk Sevdim (2011–12), portraying the leading role of Sinan Harmangil. In 2012, together with Hatice Aslan, he starred in the movie Vücut playing the character of İzzet Gündoğdu.

In 2012, he joined the DOT theater again to play the role of a boxer in the play Beautiful Burnout/Süpernova, directed by Murat Daltaban. He took boxing lessons in order to prepare for the role. He was then cast in Esme Madra's short film Meşakkat ve Karısı, which was a nominee in the best fictional short film category at the Akbank 9th Short Film Festival. In 2013, together with Ulaş Tuna Astepe and Efe Tunçer, he founded the music band Bir Aralık. Kurtaş is active as a songwriter, composer, guitarist and singer within the band. In 2020, he released a song together with musician Kalben.

== Filmography ==
Film
Year	Title	Role	Notes
2012	Vücut	İzzet Gündoğdu	Leading role
2016	Saruhan	İbrahim	Leading role
2017	Martıların Efendisi	Hakan	Leading role
2017	Bölük	Murat Akman	Leading role
2018	İyi Oyun	Arda	Supporting role
Television
Year	Title	Role	Notes
2011	Ezel	Can Uçar	Supporting role
2011–2012	Bir Çocuk Sevdim	Sinan Harmangil	Leading role
2013	A.Ş.K.	Kerem Gürsoy	Leading role
2015	Analar ve Anneler	Murat	Supporting role
2015–2016	Filinta	Abdul Hamid II	Supporting role
2016	Seddülbahir 32 Saat	Nafiz	Supporting role
2017	Dolunay	Deniz Kaya	Supporting role
2018	8. Gün	Rüstem Alaban	Supporting role
2018–2019	Çarpışma	Demir Alkan	Supporting role
2019–2020	Kadın	Cem Bey	Supporting role
2020–2021	Mucize Doktor	Doruk Özütürk	Supporting role
2022	Baba	İlhan Karaçam	Supporting role
2024	Kimler Geldi, Kimler Geçti	Cem Murathan	Leading role
Theatre
Year	Title	Notes	Director
2010	Dot-Punk Rock		Rıza Kocaoğlu
2010	Avaz Avaz	writer: Hakan Kurtaş	Aralık Hareketi
2012	Beautiful Burnout/Süpernova	leading role	Murat Daltaban
2017	İstila!		Sami Berat Marçalı
2019	Yak Bunu		Sami Berat Marçalı

== Awards ==
Awards
Year	Award	Category	Work
2010	Afife Jale Theatre Awards	New Generation Special Award	
2011	16th Sadri Alışık Awards	Ephesus Special Award	Punk Rock
2011	18th Golden Boll International Film Festival	Promising Actor	Vücut
