= Bennu Yıldırımlar =

Turkish actress

- Born: 22 November 1969 (age 56); Istanbul, Turkey
- Occupation: Actress
- Years active: 1990–present
- Spouse: Bülent Emin Yarar (m. 1995)
- Children: 1
- Website: bennuyildirimlar.com

Bennu Yıldırımlar Yarar (born 22 November 1969) is a Turkish actress known for her performance in Yaprak Dökümü as Fikret Tekin, Umutsuz Ev Kadınları as Nermin, Kadın as Hatice, and Süper Baba as Elif.

== Biography ==
Her family is Turkish origin who immigrated from Macedonia and Crete, Greece. Bennu Yıldırımlar studied at Erenköy Girls High School and graduated from Istanbul University State Conservatory in 1990. From 1990 to 1991, she gained experience at the Westminster Adult Education Institute in London. Yıldırımlar was chosen 'Most Promising new Actress' at the 6th Ankara Film Festival for her role in Ağrıya Dönüş in 1994. In 1999, she was given the 'Best Actress' Sadri Alışık award for her performance in the film Kaç Para Kaç.

She has been married to actor Bülent Emin Yarar since 1995.

== Filmography ==
Television
Year	Title	Role	Network
1988	Perili Köşk		TRT
1990	Gençler		TRT
1990	Gülen Ayva Ağlayan Nar		
1993	Rifle King Kong Show		Kanal 6
1994	Piranha Films		Channel 4
1994	Muhteşem Zango		Star TV
1995	Kopgel Taksi		Star TV
1995	Video Klip ve Çizgi Film Sunuşları		Show TV
1996	Sharpe's Revenge		Carlton TV
1997	Süper Baba	Elif	ATV
1998	Utanmaz Adam		ATV
1998	Kördüğüm		TRT
2001	Tek Celse		TRT
2001	Üzgünüm Leyla		TRT
2001	Kim Gitsin Yarışma Programı		Star TV
2002	Bir Tatlı Huzur		Show TV
2002	Şapkadan Babam Çıktı	Emel	TRT
2004	Avrupa Yakası	"Guest appearance"	ATV
2005	Aynalar	Gül	TRT
2005	Maki	Iraz	Show TV
2006–2010	Yaprak Dökümü	Fikret Tekin	Kanal D
2011–2014	Umutsuz Ev Kadınları	Nermin Seçkinoğlu	Kanal D-Fox
2014–2015	Gönül İşleri	Servet Üstün	Star TV
2016	Altınsoylar	Saadet Altınsoy	Kanal D
2017–2019	Kadın	Hatice Sarıkadı	Fox
2021	Sadakatsiz	Asya Günalan	Kanal D
2021	Olağan Şüpheliler	Feyza	Exxen
2022	Kusursuz Kiracı	Madam Vula	Fox
2023	Veda Mektubu	Seher Karlı	Kanal D
2023–2024	Kara	Sema Talan	Show TV
2025-2026	Kurulus :Orhan	Malhun Hatun	ATV

Film
Year	Title	Role
1992	Adada Son Gece	
1993	Hacı Yusuf Efendi	
1994	Ağrı'ya Dönüş	Muhsine
1994	Gece, Melek ve Bizim Çocuklar	Gülsen
1998	Eski Fotoğraflar	
1998	Kaç Para Kaç	Ayla
1999	Ölümün El Yazısı	
2000	Hiç Yoktan Aşk	Nurgül
2006	Kabuslar Evi: Kaçan Fırsatlar Limited	Filiz
2009	Gökten Üç Elma Düştü	Nilgün
2010	Kars Öyküleri	
2016	Ağustos Böcekleri ve Karıncalar	Selma
2018	Ahlat Ağacı	Asuman

== Theatre Plays ==
- 2016 - Twelfth Night : Shakespeare - Istanbul City Theatres
- 2012 - Living in Tight Shoes : Dušan Kovačević - Istanbul City Theatres
- 2011 - Meeting Place : Dušan Kovačević - Istanbul City Theatres
- 2009 - General Rehearsal of Suicide : Dušan Kovačević - Istanbul City Theatres
- 2007 - Three Sisters - Anton Chekhov (Masha) - Istanbul City Theatres
- 2006 - The Respectful Harlot - Jean-Paul Sartre (Lizzie) - Istanbul City Theatres [1] [2] Archived 30 September 2007 at the Wayback Machine .
- 2002-2007 - Yaprak Dökümü (The Falling Leaves) - Based on the novel of the same name by Reşat Nuri Güntekin (Fikret) - Istanbul City Theatres
- 2002-2003 - Richard III - Shakespeare - Istanbul City Theatres
- 2002 - Fire-Faced - Marius von Mayenburg - Istanbul City Theatres
- 2002 - Women.War.Comedy - Thomas Brasch - Istanbul City Theatres
- 2001-2002 - Everyone in the Same Garden - Collage of Anton Chekhov plays - Istanbul City Theatres
- 1998-1999 - Huzur - Based on the novel of the same name by Ahmet Hamdi Tanpınar (Nuran) - Istanbul City Theatres
- 1995 - The Story of a Horse - Adapted from Tolstoy by M. Rozovsky - Istanbul City Theatres
- 1994 - My Military Service - N. Simon - Istanbul City Theatres
- 1990 - Three Sisters - Anton Chekhov - Istanbul City Theatres

== Awards and nominations ==
Year	Awards	Category	Work	Result	Ref.
1994	Ankara International Film Festival	Most Promising New Actress	Ağrı’ya Dönüş	Won	
1996	Bedia Muvahhit Award	Best Actress for the play	The Story of a Horse (Bir Atın Öyküsü)	Won	
1998	İsmet Küntay Awards	Best Actress for the play	Huzur	Won	
1999	Turkish Film Critics Association (SİYAD) Awards	Best Actress	A Run for Money (Kaç Para Kaç)	Nominated	
2000	Sadri Alışık Theatre and Cinema Awards	Best Actress	A Run for Money (Kaç Para Kaç)	Won	
2000	32nd Turkish Film Critics Association Awards	Best Actress	A Run for Money (Kaç Para Kaç)	Nominated	
2002	6th Afife Theatre Awards	Best Supporting Actress of the Year	Everyone in the Same Garden	Won	
2006	11th Sadri Alışık Theatre and Film Actor Awards	Most Successful Female Actress of the Year	Saygılı Yosma	Nominated	
2006	6th Direklerarası Audience Awards	Best Actress	Saygılı Yosma (The Respectful Harlot)	Won	
2008	Golden Butterfly Awards (Altın Kelebek)	Best Actress for the TV series	Yaprak Dökümü	Won	
2018	Turkish Film Critics Association (SİYAD) Awards	Best Supporting Actress	The Wild Pear Tree (Ahlat Ağacı)	Won	
2019	Sadri Alışık Theatre and Cinema Awards	Best Performance by an Actress in a Supporting Role (Drama)	The Wild Pear Tree (Ahlat Ağacı)	Won	
2020	Golden Artemis Awards	Best Supporting Actress (TV Series)	Woman (Kadın)	Nominated	
2025	Moon Life Magazine Awards	Best Female Character Player for her role as Malhun Hatun	Kuruluş: Orhan	Won	
