= Ava Yaman =

Turkish actress (born 2006)

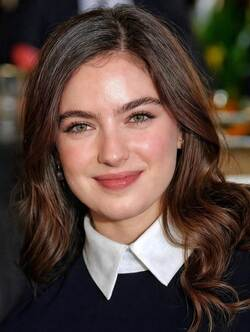
- Born: 19 November 2006 (age 19); Istanbul, Turkey
- Occupation: Actress
- Years active: 2023–present

Ava Yaman (born 19 November 2006) is a Turkish actress.

== Life and career ==
Yaman has been interested in music and acting since childhood and received training in acting for the camera.

She had her first acting experience in the TV series Bir Derdim Var, released in 2023, where she played the bipolar character Özge. With her second project, Taşacak Bu Deniz, she gained nationwide fame and her performance was well-received by the critics.

== Filmography ==
Television
Year	Title	Role	Notes	Network
2023	Bir Derdim Var	Özge	Supporting role	Kanal D
2025–present	Taşacak Bu Deniz	Eleni Miryano	Leading role	TRT 1
2025/2026	O Ses Türkiye New Year's Special	Herself	Guest appearance	TV8
2025/2026	Lingo Türkiye New Year's Special	Herself	Guest appearance	TRT 1
