= Bülent Emin Yarar =

Turkish actor and theatre director (born 1961)

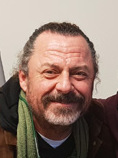
- Born: January 1, 1961 (age 64); Ankara, Turkey
- Occupation(s): Actor, director
- Spouse: Bennu Yıldırımlar (m. 1995)
- Children: 1

Bülent Emin Yarar (born 1 January 1961) is a Turkish actor and theatre director.

== Life and career ==
Yarar was born in Ankara. He became interested in theatre at a young age after watching several plays with his family. He didn't participate in any professional plays until the end of high school. As his father was a violinist, Yarar became interested in music as well and enrolled in Mimar Sinan University Start Conservatory to learn singing. While learning opera, he joined the Turkish State Theatres as an extra actor and began working on the stage. The first play that he had a role in was İstanbul Efendisi.

Due to pressures from his family, he eventually enrolled in the theatre department of the university that he was studying at and graduated in 1989. In the same year he began working at the Diyarbakır State Theatre. Between 1994–1995, he worked for Istanbul State Theatre.

After returning to Istanbul, he directed the plays Ada and Getto for Tiyatro Ti. In 1998, he joined Tiyatro Studios and was cast in the leading role in The Balcony by Jean Genet, and in 1999 he had a leading role in an adaptation of Cyrano de Bergerac. After beginning to work for Oyun Studios, he was cast in Ermişler ya da Günahkarlar alongside Haluk Bilginer and Şenay Gürler. Together with Işıl Kasapoğlu, he directed the play Mem ile Zin for Semaver Company.

Aside from his career on stage, he has appeared in various cinema and television productions.

== Filmography ==
- Heartsong (2022) - Mirze
- Ayak İşleri (2021) - Sermet Abi
- Dip (2018) - Ali Kemal
- Karışık Kaset (2014) - Ali
- 20 Dakika (2013) - Kedi Mesut Bilaloğlu
- Kalbim 4 Mevsim (2012) - Necmi
- Celal Tan ve Ailesinin Aşırı Acıklı Hikayesi (2011)
- Başlangıç (2011)
- Öğretmen Kemal (2010) - Kemal Güngör
- Beş Şehir (2009) - Tevfik
- Dersimiz Atatürk (2009) -
- Güneşin Oğlu (2008) - Kurban Murat
- Arka Sıradakiler (2007–2010) - Kemal Güngör
- Sapak (2007) -
- Zincirbozan (2007) - Bülent Ecevit
- Beş Vakit (2006) - İmam
- Korkuyorum Anne (2006) - Kasap
- Kız Babası (TV) (2006) - Cevahir Kılıç
- Dişi Kuş (TV) (2004) - Reşat Nuri
- Kalp Gözü (TV) (2004) -
- Çamur (2002) - Halil
- Kaç Para Kaç (1999) - Selim's friend
- Süper Baba (TV) (1996–97) - Lawyer
- Hoşçakal (1989) - Yavuz's friend

== Awards ==
- 17th International Adana Golden Cocoon Film Festival : Best Supporting Actor - Beş Şehir - 2010
- 14th Afife Theatre Awards : Most Successful Actor of the Year - Professional - 2010
- İsmail Dümbüllü Awards : Special Award - 2007
- 9th Afife Theatre Awards : Most Successful Actor of the Year - Çayhane and Diktat - 2005
- 5th Lions Theatre Awards : Most Successful Comedy Actor of the Year - Çayhane - 2005
- MSM Awards : Art Award - Cyrano de Bergerac - 2000
- 4th Afife Theatre Awards : Most Successful Supporting Actor of the Year - The Resistible Rise of Arturo Ui - 2000
- Ankara Art Institute Awards : Praiseworthy Actor Award - Miletos Güzeli - 1994
