= Fahriye Sultan =

Ottoman princess

- Born: c. 1594; Topkapı Palace, Constantinople, Ottoman Empire
- Died: 16 November 1678 (aged 83–84); Constantinople, Ottoman Empire (present day Istanbul, Turkey)
- Burial: Murad III Mausoleum, Hagia Sophia Mosque
- Spouse: Çuhadar Ahmed Pasha (m. 1604; died 1618) Sofu Bayram Pasha (m. 1618; died 1632) Deli Dilaver Pasha (m. 1633; died 1668)
- Dynasty: Ottoman
- Father: Murad III
- Religion: Sunni Islam

Fahriye Sultan (Ottoman Turkish: فخری سلطان, also Fahri Sultan; c. 1594 – 16 November 1678), was an Ottoman princess, daughter of Sultan Murad III (reign 1574–1595) and half-sister of Sultan Mehmed III (reign 1595–1603) of the Ottoman Empire.

== Biography ==
Fahriye Sultan was born around 1594. She couldn't be the daughter of Safiye Sultan - the Haseki Sultan of Sultan Murad III - as in a document dated to 1073 AH (1662), it is mentioned that she was full-sister of Sehime Sultan, another daughter of the Sultan. Their mother being the same unknown woman, she is referred to as Fülane.

In 1595 her father died and her brother, Mehmed III ascended to the throne. In 1603 her brother died and her thirteen-year-old nephew, Ahmed I, ascended to the throne. Ahmed married Fahriye to Çuhadar Ahmed Pasha in 1604. The marriage remained childless and the pasha died in 1618. When Osman II deposed Mustafa I, Fahriye lived in the palace and received the same salary as other members of the dynasty. Her second husband was Sofu Bayram Pasha, whom she married in 1618 and was widowed at his death in 1632. Her third husband was Deli Dilaver Pasha.

During the reign of sultan Murad IV, her stipend was 430 aspers a day. She is known to receive gifts from the Ragusans from the 1640s all up until the 1670s. However, once she was deliberately overlooked for reasons unknown, likely driven by a reduction in public spending. After waiting for a year, she instructed her kethüda to inquire with the ambassadors why their predecessors had not provided her the privileges she was entitled to. When the ambassadors showed no inclination to rectify the situation, she sought the intervention of the grand vizier, sending a copy to Caboga, the Ragusan ambassador. The outcome remains uncertain.

She died on 16 November 1678 in Constantinople.

== In popular culture ==
In the 2015 TV series Muhteşem Yüzyıl: Kösem, Fahriye Sultan is portrayed by Turkish actress Gülcan Arslan.
