= Taşacak Bu Deniz =

Turkish television series

- Genre: Drama
- Written by: Ayşe Ferda Eryılmaz; Nehir Erdem
- Directed by: Çağrı Bayrak
- Starring: Ulaş Tuna Astepe; Deniz Baysal; Burak Yörük; Ava Yaman
- Composers: Ayşe Önder; Ümit Önder; Yüksel Baltacı
- Country of origin: Turkey
- Original language: Turkish
- No. of seasons: 2
- No. of episodes: 39

Production
- Producers: Onur Güvenatam; Fozan Khan
- Production locations: Trabzon, Turkey
- Running time: 165 minutes
- Production companies: OGM Pictures; Orzan Studios

Original release
- Network: TRT 1
- Release: 10 October 2025 – present

Taşacak Bu Deniz (lit. 'This sea will overflow', Official English title by TRT: Deep in Love) is a Turkish television drama series produced by OGM Pictures and Orzan Studios, directed by Çağrı Bayrak, and written by Ayşe Ferda Eryılmaz and Nehir Erdem. The series stars Ulaş Tuna Astepe and Deniz Baysal who are the leads, with Burak Yörük and Ava Yaman as supporting lead cast. Filming for Taşacak Bu Deniz takes place in the districts of Arsin, Araklı, Sürmene, and Of in Trabzon. The first episode aired on 10 October 2025, on TRT 1.

== Cast ==
=== Main characters ===
Actor / Actress	Character	Chapter	About
Ulaş Tuna Astepe	Adil Koçari	1-	He is both rebellious and a leader. He still harbors the heart of a 17-year-old lover. He is Eleni's biological father. Adil forms a rather unshakable bond with Eleni before the full truth of their biological connection comes to light, and he gradually begins treating her like a daughter. He was shot by Esme in the first episode. Adil is a member of the family that gave its name to the village of Koçari. He is the current leader of the village and is often addressed as Patron by its residents because he employs most of the people living there. His family owns the village's livestock business and is the primary source of employment and economic support for the local community.
Deniz Baysal	Esme Er/Koçari (previously Furtuna)	1-	Esme Çavuş is a true Black Sea woman. One moment she's turbulent, the next she's calm. She is Eleni's biological mother. Esme forms a rather unshakable bond with Eleni before the full truth of their biological connection comes to light, and she gradually begins treating her like a daughter. Esme is also the village chief (muhtar) of Furtuna, who handles conflicts and often acts as a mediator between Furtuna residents.
Burak Yörük	Oruç Furtuna	1-	Oruç is a member of the Furtuna family that gave its name to the village. His family owns the village's tea business and serves as the primary source of employment and economic support for the local community. When he learns that his mother was involved in selling Eleni to a Greek family, Melina and Gregory Miryano, Oruç chooses to stand by his family. Fearing what Adil Koçari might do if he discovered their involvement. Oruç initially presents Hicran as Eleni's mother and proves this with a false DNA test.
Ava Yaman	Eleni Miryano / Aleyna Koçari	1-	She has come to Trabzon from Greece to search for her biological mother. Beneath her strong exterior lies a broken little girl yearning for affection. She has an academic IQ of 175. She graduated from high school at 14. She became a doctor at 20. Due to a lack of affection from her adoptive mother (Melina Miryano) and the absence of friends, she invented NIKO (Nero Integrated Knowledge Observer), an advanced AI and machine learning program to act as both her friend and a medical database. She is in fact, Aleyna Koçari, the biological daughter of Adil and Esme. Unbeknownst to Adil, Esme was told by Şerif Furtuna and Zarife Furtuna that her baby girl had been born dead.She forms a rather unshakable bond with both of her biological parents before the full truth of their biological connection comes to light. She is in awe of Adil and Esme's love story and, without knowing the truth, begins to wish she were their daughter.

=== Other characters ===
Actor / Actress	Character	Chapter	About
Zeynep Atılgan	Fadime Koçari/Furtuna	1-	She is the beloved younger sister of Adil Koçari, the stern-natured leader of the Koçari family, and unlike Adil, she is cheerful and fearless. She is Eleni's aunt and is married to İso.
Erdem Şanlı	İsmail (İso) Furtuna	1-	İsmail Furtuna, known simply as İso, actually resembles his uncle Şerif in many ways, but he embodies his uncle's good qualities rather than his bad ones. He is married to Fadime.
Yeşim Ceren Bozoğlu	Zarife Furtuna	1-	She's the kind of person who would set the world on fire for her family. But she's equally ruthless towards outsiders.
Aytek Şayan	Şerif Furtuna	1-	For him, life is like a game of chess. Lies, threats, friendship—it doesn't matter. All he wants is to always be the winner.
Burcu Cavrar	Hicran Cezbeli	1-	Hicran is also known as the nurse. Although she hates loneliness, she is far lonelier than one might think. For her, she has only one family: Zarife Furtuna.
Hakan Salınmış	Dursun Koçari / Uncle Amirum	1-	He is from the Koçari family. He is Eyüphan's father. He is often referred to as Uncle Amirum. He is one of the influential figures in the Koçari village.
Gamze Süner Atay	Şirin Furtuna	1-	She manages the Furtuna mansion. She is one of the most influential members of the Furtuna family. She is the mother of Şerif and her deceased son Mehmet. She is Zarife's mother-in-law. She is the grandmother of Oruç, İso and Fatih. Adil calls her Şirinum Furtunam. She is generally well-liked because she is considered a better person than the other Furtuna family members.
Hande Nur Tekin	Sevcan Er	1-	She is Esme's sister, Eleni's aunt, and Şükriye's daughter. She has been pursuing Oruç for years. She desperately wants to succeed in many things, but mostly prefers taking shortcuts.
Batuhan Bayar	Eyüphan Koçari	1-	He comes from the Koçari family. He is a relative of Adil. He is the biological son of Uncle Amirum. He often seems caught between the Koçari and Furtuna families.
Ali Öner	Gökhan Furtuna	1-	He is from Furtuna village. He is one of Şerif's men. He is one of the biggest enemies of v village.
Seda Soysal	Emine Konak	1-	She is a member of the Furtuna family and Esme's sister. She is also Hıdır's wife. She is Eleni's aunt. In the first episode, she is pregnant. In the second episode, with Eleni's help, she gives birth to a son. She works as Esme's secretary at the village headman's office. She is a sensible, calm, and trustworthy person.
Erkan Yüce	Hıdır Konak	1-	He is Emine's husband. He is also known as "Batum Hıdır".
Ali Kemal Yılmaz	Temel	1-	He is the captain. He mostly helps the Koçari family. Adil Koçari knows him well.
Ali Absüsselam Yılmaz	Çakır Koçari (Çakır Uşak)	1-	He is one of Adil Koçari's men. He is a young and energetic man. He is married to Akça.
Nasmina Çoklaş	Muhsine Furtuna	1-	She is Çetin's sister. She is constantly caught in the middle of the war between the villages of Koçari and Furtuna. Because she often has weak willpower, she chooses the side of whoever is in power at the moment.
Naz Günay	Akça Koçari	1, 4, 7-	She is a native of Koçari village. She is the wife of Çakır Uşak. She married Çakır in episode 8. It is revealed in episode 24 that she is pregnant.
Emir Çubukçu	Behçet Konak	1-4, 8-	He is a native of Furtuna village. He is cunning and resourceful. He tries to profit from the tensions between Furtuna and Koçari, or sides with whoever is more powerful. He is known for his wickedness in both Koçari and Furtuna.
Adil Şahin	Çetin Furtuna	1-4, 8-	He is a native of Furtuna village. He is not much different from Behçet. He hangs out with him. Like Behçet, he is known for his wickedness both in Koçari and Furtuna.
Özgür Yolcu	Kadir	2-	He is the Chief Inspector. He appears in episode 2 when the Koçari family is banned from entering Furtuna. In episode 11, he and prosecutor Feride detain Adil and his men, but they are released.
Berna Koraltürk	İlve Varoğlu	7-	She is Gezep's twin sister and Atakan's mother. Adil brings her from Istanbul to Trabzon for a DNA test. Şerif kidnaps her son and is forced to alter the test results. In episode 10, she is shot by Şerif, but Oruç saves her. Then her son escapes from Şerif's clutches.
Ahmet Çınar Aydın	Atakan	7-11, 32-	He is Gezep's nephew and İlve's son. He is kidnapped by Şerif but is eventually rescued and reunited with his mother. For his safety, his mother takes him to Istanbul to be with his father.
Naz Çağla Irmak	Feride Cengiz	11-	Also known as Feride "Cingöz". She is a former prosecutor. Following Oruç's tip, she had Adil and his men arrested. She manages to gain notoriety wherever she goes. She lost her job as prosecutor because of Şerif. In episode 23, she became Esme's divorce lawyer.
Celil Nalçakan	Timur Volkov	28-	He is Adil's contact in Russia.
Ayla Baki	Emriye Varoğlu	32-	She is Adil's aunt and wet nurse. Emriye, who moved to the highlands years ago, does not return to her village empty-handed. She comes back with her anger and power. In her eyes, Adil has committed one unforgivable crime: marrying the daughter-in-law of the enemy Furtuna family! After being reunited 20 years later, Adil and Esme now face their biggest obstacle yet: Emriye Varoğlu.
Buse Sinem İren	Huriye Varoğlu	32-	Huriye comes to Koçari together with Emriye. At first glance, Huriye is the kind of danger no one would consider an enemy. But she is sharp-eyed and knows how to calculate her moves. Life taught her one thing from a young age: You never let an opportunity pass you by... For Huriye, that opportunity will be Adil Koçari.
Ali Önsöz	Cengiz Volkov	32-	Timur's son. Unlike his father, his weapons are neither bullets nor brute force, but loopholes in the law and people's weaknesses. But a surprise awaits him in the Black Sea—one even his father never anticipated.
Köksal Çalık	Orhan Varoğlu (Köstebek Orhan)	32-	Emriye's husband. The father of Gezep and İlve. Huriye's uncle. He took the blame for Ömer Koçari shooting Mehmet Furtuna and was sent to prison. He is close friends with Şerif Furtuna.

=== Flashback characters ===
Actor / Actress	Character	Chapter
Arda Anarat	Young Adil Koçari	1-
Naz Sayıner	Young Esme Er	1-
Defne Serra Ay	Child Eleni Miryano	1-
Zehra Coşkun	Young Hicran Cezbeli	5-
Haktan Akarçeşme	Young Şerif Furtuna	5-
Sudem Tiryakigil	Young İlve Varoğlu	7-
Güneş Işıksal	Child Fadime Furtuna	13-
Adem Mert Erol	Child İsmail (İso) Furtuna	27-
Rızacan Durmuş	İhsan	31-

=== Voice ===
Actor / Actress	Character Voice	Chapter	About
Barış Başar	Niko	1-	It is an artificial intelligence assistant developed by Eleni.

=== Finished characters ===
Actor / Actress	Character	Chapter	About
Özge Arslan	Ballı Yeşilova	2, 6-10	She is Hicran's cousin. In episode 2, she secretly attends Oruç and Sevcan's engagement party. For years, she collected her deceased mother's pension by pretending to be the midwife of Sürmene Sultan. After Gezep and Adil find her, the Koçari family takes her in as a guest. In episode 10, she is shot and killed by Şerif.
Ulviye Karaca	Şükriye Er	1-13	She is the mother of Esme, Sevcan, and Emine. She is the grandmother of Emine's son and Eleni. She is one of the best-known and most colorful figures in Furtuna village. She is a typical Black Sea woman. She is often at the center of the village gossip. She defends Sevcan in almost everything. Under pressure from Adil, she takes the blame for Esme shooting Şerif and is sent to prison.
Onur Dilber	Süleyman Varoğlu / Gezep Şerif	1-31	He is from the Koçari family. He is Adil's aunt's son, thus Adil's cousin. Also known as Gezep, he is known as a complete hothead. Enemies fear Gezep's anger the most.
Emirhan Parlak	Süleyman Varoğlu / Gezep Şerif	7-32	Young Gezep Koçari
Gerçek Alnıaçık	Melina Miryano	1-4, 8-31	She is Eleni's adoptive mother, who raised her. She is a respected doctor in Athens. Often, her work is more important to her than anything else. She is known for her protective personality towards Eleni. Because she cannot show Eleni affection, Eleni doesn't like her very much either.
Rami Narin	Mikael Zanakis (Mika)	3-31	He is Eleni's childhood sweetheart from Greece. He comes to Trabzon to help Melina.

== Series overview ==
Series	Episodes	Originally released	
Series	Episodes	First released	Last released
1	31	10 October 2025	5 June 2026
2	TBA	2 October 2026	TBA
