= Burak Yörük =

Turkish actor (born 1995)

- Born: Burak Erman Yörük; 26 May 1995 (age 31); Şişli, Istanbul, Turkey
- Occupation: Actor
- Years active: 2002–present
- Spouse: Tuana Yılmaz (m. 2026)

Burak Erman Yörük (born 26 May 1995) is a Turkish film and television actor.

== Personal life ==
His paternal family is of Yörük descent, which is a Turkic ethnic subgroup. His maternal family is of Albanian descent. He began acting as child actor. He studied theatre department in Beykent University. His family works in TV-media industry. His father was a producer.

Burak Yörük had been dating Tuana Yılmaz, who is a designer and singer, since 2021. They married in 2026.

== Career ==
Yörük made his debut on television with a role in the series in 2002 as child actor. He played minor role as child actor.

He was cast in 20 Dakika alongside Tuba Büyüküstün. He had a role in the politically themed series Ben Onu Çok Sevdim as Aydın Menderes in 2013 alongside Birce Akalay. In 2017, he joined the cast of the series Dayan Yüreğim.

He further rose to prominence with his role as Barış Ozansoy in 4N1K İlk Aşk (2018) and its sequel series 4N1K Yeni Başlangıçlar (2019) and 4N1K movies (2017)(2018) which adaptation of the novel. He played in the 2020 series Baraj which was made into a film in 1977, alongside Tarık Akan and Türkan Şoray. The following year he began starring in the romantic comedy TV series Seversin and Aşk Mantık İntikam. He also had a role in the drama series Taş Kağıt Makas.

Burak Yörük and Tuana Yılmaz performed in musical theater "Broadway in İstanbul".

== Filmography ==
Television
Year	Title	Role	Notes
2004	Biz Boşanıyoruz	CanCan	
2005	Perde		
2005	Şeytan		
2007	Dede Korkut Hikayeleri - Salur Kazan	Salur Kazan	
2013	20 Dakika	Tayfur Solmaz	
2013–2014	Ben Onu Çok Sevdim	Aydın Menderes	
2015	Hayat Yolunda	Recep	
2017	Dayan Yüreğim	Erdem	
2018	4N1K İlk Aşk	Barış Ozansoy	
2019	4N1K Yeni Başlangıçlar	Barış Ozansoy	
2020–2021	Baraj	Tarık Yılmaz	
2021–2022	Aşk Mantık İntikam	Çınar Yılmaz	
2022	Seversin	Tolga Tuna	
2024	Taş Kağıt Makas	Fecir Emirkıran	
2025	Sustalı Ceylan	Ferhat Kanturalı	
2025–	Taşacak Bu Deniz	Oruç furtuna	
Movies
Year	Title	Role	Notes
2017	4N1K	Barış Ozansoy	
2018	4N1K 2	Barış Ozansoy	

=== Music videos ===
- 2019 – Baran Bayraktar – "Yine"
- 2019 – Zeynep Bastık & Anıl Piyancı – "Bırakman Doğru mu?"
- 2019 – Reynmen – "Ela"
- 2020 – Zeynep Bastık – "Her Mevsim Yazım"
