= Run for Money =

1999 Turkish film by Reha Erdem

- Directed by: Reha Erdem
- Written by: Reha Erdem
- Produced by: Ömer Atay
- Starring: Taner Birsel; Bennu Yıldırımlar; Zuhal Gencer; Engin Alkan
- Cinematography: Florent Herry; Jean-Louis Vialard
- Edited by: Nathalie LeGuay
- Music by: Dave Henley; Justin Langlands
- Production company: Atlantik Film
- Distributed by: Warner Bros. (Turkey)
- Release date: December 17, 1999 (Turkey)
- Country: Turkey
- Language: Turkish

Run for Money (Turkish: Kaç para kaç) is a 1999 Turkish film directed by Reha Erdem. It was Turkey's submission to the 73rd Academy Awards for the Academy Award for Best Foreign Language Film, but was not accepted as a nominee.

== Premise ==
Selim, a down-on-his-luck owner of a clothing store in Istanbul, boards a taxi one evening that contains a suitcase left behind by a previous passenger. The briefcase contains stacks of American $100 bills. Selim attempts to locate the owner of the briefcase, but the owner cannot be found. However, Selim learns the owner was a bank clerk who stole the money (totaling $450,000) from his place of employment. In the meantime, Selim stores the money in his shop. One day his store's cash register is robbed (and not the suitcase money). Selim gives in to temptation and starts to spend the money, at first only buying necessities but then gradually indulging in lavish purchases. This leads him down a dangerous path as he searches for the robber and tries to evade the owner of the suitcase.

== Cast ==
- Taner Birsel as Selim
- Bennu Yıldırımlar as Ayla
- Zuhal Gencer as Nihal
- Engin Alkan as Ahmet
- Sermet Yesil as Çirak

== Reception ==
=== Critical response ===
Phil Hall of Film Threat reviewed the film positively, writing that it "is a harrowing dissection of the nastier aspects of the human spirit. Filmmaker Erdem keeps the action flowing in swift, staccato rhythms that never veer into the predictable, and he wisely throws in inexplicable behavior which mirrors his protagonist’s increasingly warped inner emotions". He also commended Birsel's performance, saying the character [of Selim] is both an everyman and a fool, an object of pity and derision…a real person, perhaps too real for comfort at times, and Birsel's performance covers amazing ground."

== See also ==
- Cinema of Turkey
- List of submissions to the 73rd Academy Awards for Best Foreign Language Film
- List of Turkish submissions for the Academy Award for Best Foreign Language Film
