= Ecem Erkek =

Turkish actress

- Born: 24 June 1989 (age 36); Ankara, Turkey
- Occupation: Actress
- Years active: 2017–present
- Spouse: Yüce Armağan Erkek (m. 2016; div. 2020)

Ecem Erkek (born 24 June 1989) is a Turkish actress.

== Career ==
Erkek was born in 1989 in Ankara. Her family is from Sivas. After graduating from Ankara Ömer Seyfettin High School in 2006, she decided to become an actress and took drama training at Mamak Municipality Conservatory between 2007–2008 and diction training at Hacettepe University Turkish Society in 2008.

She worked as a trainee in Ankara Art Theatre in 2009, and later in 2010 she enrolled as a theatre art major in the School of Language and History – Geography of Ankara University, and graduated from this school in 2015. Starting her acting career with theatre plays, she was cast in many plays including The American Dream, Woyzeck, The Threepenny Opera, Tersine Dünya, Romeo and Juliet and Şark Dişçisi. She joined the cast of the TV series Hayat Sırları in 2017.

She later got different roles in the theatre sketches Güldür Güldür, which is still brought to stage in Turkey. In 2018, she appeared in two episodes of Netflix original series The Protector. In 2020, she was nominated for the Best Female Comedian award at the 46th Golden Butterfly Awards, but the award ceremony was not held as scheduled due to the 2020 Balyun airstrikes.

She has also recorded and released two songs, "Bu Da Gelir Bu Da Geçer" and "Nereden Bileceksiniz", with the band Taksim Trio.

== Filmography ==
=== Television ===
Television
Year	Title	Role	Notes	Network
2017	Hayat Sırları	Şirin Kuzgun	Supporting role	Star TV
2017–2021	Güldür Güldür Show	Naime	Leading role	Show TV
2022–	Güzel Günler	Füsun	Leading role	Show TV

=== Film ===
Film
Year	Title	Role	Notes
2021	Sen Hiç Ateşböceği Gördün mü?	Gülseren Biröz	Leading role, Netflix
2022	Müjdemi İsterim	Müjde	Leading role

=== Web series ===
Web series
Year	Title	Role	Notes	Network
2018	Hakan: Muhafız	Sıla	Guest appearance	Netflix
2022	Aşk Kumardır		Leading role	Exxen
