= Barbaros: Sword of the Mediterranean =

Turkish television series

- Also known as: Barbarossa; Barbaros Hayreddin Sultanin Fermani
- Genre: Historical drama; Action
- Based on: Hizir Reis
- Written by: Serdar Onozalan; Hasan Erimez
- Directed by: Berat Ozdogan; Dogan Ümit Karaca
- Starring: Engin Altan Düzyatan; Ulaş Tuna Astepe
- Country of origin: Turkey
- Original language: Turkish
- No. of seasons: 1
- No. of episodes: 32

Production
- Producers: Yusuf Esenkal; Serdar Ogretici
- Production location: Istanbul
- Cinematography: Maher Maleh
- Running time: 120-150 minutes
- Production company: ES Film

Original release
- Network: TRT 1 (Turkish language) PTV Home (Urdu language)
- Release: 16 September 2021 – 26 May 2022

Related
- Barbaros Hayreddin: Sultanın Fermanı

Barbaros: Sword of the Mediterranean (Turkish: Barbaroslar: Akdeniz'in Kılıcı) is a Turkish action drama television series created by ES Film, starring Engin Altan Düzyatan and Ulaş Tuna Astepe in the lead roles. The series depicts the lives of Oruc Reis and Hizir Reis, two consecutive "Kapudan Pasha" of the Ottoman Empire. Barbaros: Sword of the Mediterranean premiered on 16 September 2021 on TRT 1. It had sequel series Barbaros Hayreddin: Sultanın Fermanı.

== Premise ==
The series details the life of Oruc Reis, Hizir Reis and their brothers. The plot starts from when Oruc Reis kills a pirate, who turns out to be Poseidon/ Antuan's brother. Antuan swears revenge and raids Oruc's older brother, Ishak's house, killing his pregnant wife and kids. Oruc, Hizir and Ilyaas rescue their older brothers but he is furious with Oruc. Oruc tries to tell him that his wife Despina is pregnant but he doesn't want to hear it. Later Ishak reconciles with his brother. An emir of the Mamluks Emir Karaby comes and is bent on defeating Oruc, even if it means uniting with their enemies. Oruc eventually kills him. Despina dies shortly after she miscarries her baby. Oruc falls in love with Isabel, a girl who has helped them a lot. Meanwhile, a girl called Meryem arrives, the adopted daughter of Dervish Baba who saved her from a slave trader. She later finds out she is the sister of Pietro, the commander of Kalimnos, and the enemy of Oruc and Hizir. This girl has a book, which is vital for both sides. They rescue that book a lot of times. Hizir gradually starts falling in love with her. Ilya's marries Ester, who becomes Muslim and her name changes to Esma. They conquer Kalimnos, and kill Pietro. Shahbaz a traitor is also caught and killed. Gabriel, a new enemy captures Oruc and has him in captivity until Hizir rescues him. They conquer Modon and kill Gabriel. They lose many of their levents on the way. Don Diego comes and he is a savage Spanish commander. They fight against him and Selim of Tunis, who betrayed them. In this, Esma and Ilyaas are martyred by Don Diego and his lover, Rosa. Many of Oruc's levents get martyred too. Eventually, they lure Oruc in a trap and treacherously kill him. Oruc Jas already conquered Algeria, and Hizir takes revenge for his brother, by first destroying Rosa, and then killing Don Diego. He becomes Sultan with Piri Reis and Antuan, who has become Muslim after regretting everyone he killed and changes his name to Murat. Its sequel is Barbaros Hayreddin Sultanin Fermani.

== Cast ==
=== Main cast ===
Actor	Character	Ref.
Engin Altan Düzyatan	Oruç Reis	
Ulaş Tuna Astepe	Hızır Reis	
Yetkin Dikinciler	İshak Ağa	
Caner Topçu	İlyas Reis	
Pelin Akil Altan	Isabel	
Yiğit Özşener	Pietro	
Bülent Alkis	Kemal Reis	
Emir Benderlioglu	Muhiuddin Piri Reis	
Bahadır Yenişehirlioğlu	Derviş Huseyin	
Cemre Gümeli	Meryem/Maria	
Devrim Evin	Murad/Antuan "Poseidon"	
İsmail Filiz	Şahin Bey (Kılıçoğlu)	
Aytek Sayan	Şahbaz Bey	
Konca Cilasun	Hüma Hatun	
Seyma Pece	Esma/Esther	
Serdar Deniz	Don Diego	
Mehmet Polat	Marco Gabriel	

=== Supporting cast ===
Actor	Character	References
Okan Şenozan	Emir Karabay	
Burcu Gul Kazbek	Firuze Hatun	
Yildirim Gucuk	Mesih Pasha	
Özge Özkaplan	Şahsenem	
Batuhan Bayar	Niko	
Tolga Iskit	Cafer	
Melis Babadag	Zeynep	
Ümit Çirak	Sylvio	

=== Baba Oruç Levents ===
Actor	Character	References
Doruk Nalbantoglu	Gulletopuk Iskender	
Murat Goçmez	Horozcu	
Tolga Akkaya	Yareli Hasan	
Eren Demirbas	Müneccim	
Gokhan Gengebey	Bülbül	
Sedat Mert	Misket	
Yaşar Bayram Gül	Musa	

=== Minor cast ===
Actor	Character	Ref.
Nezir Çinarli	Hayrabay	
Mehmet Atay	Kılıç Bey	
Gökay Müftüoglu	Diego	
Gülcan Arslan	Despina Hatun	
Suavi Eren	Süleyman Üstad	
Muhammet Çakir	Ebu Muhammed	
Armagan Oguz	Commander Radko	
Burak Poyrez	Spanish Pirate Pablo	

=== Guest characters ===
Actor	Character	Ref.
Suat Karausta	Sultan Mehmed II	
Ekrem Ispir	Sultan Suleiman I	
Numan Çakir	Sipahi Yakup Aga	
Serken Ergün	Burak Reis	

== Production ==
=== Development ===
The series is written by Cüneyt Aysan, Ozan Aksungur and Oğuz Ayaz. The series is being filmed in Istanbul. It began shooting in the last weeks of March 2021.

=== Casting ===
Casting of actors is still ongoing. It was initially confirmed that Çağatay Ulusoy would be a member of the cast, and would have the lead role, although he later announced his departure from the show due to delay in production. Engin Altan Düzyatan announced that he was taking part in the series after he had been caught outside a gym, he replied to the media that he was training hard for the new Barbaros series.

== Release ==
By July 2021, the series was expected to be released in September of that year. The first teaser trailer for the series was released on 20 June 2021. On 4 September, TRT released a second trailer for the series, revealing its title, Barbaroslar: Akdeniz'in Kılıcı (transl. Barbaros: Sword of the Mediterranean), and premiere date of 16 September.

In March 2025, Barbaros: Sword of the Mediterranean broadcast in Pakistan on state-owned television channel PTV Home.

== See also ==
- List of Islam-related films
- Barbaros Hayreddin Paşa (film)
