= Deniz Baysal =

Turkish actress (born 1991)

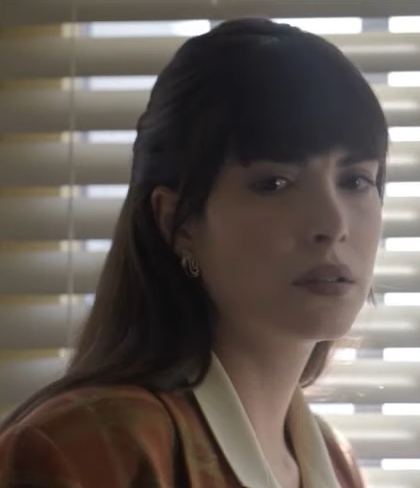
- Baysal in 7. Koğuştaki Mucize
- Born: 5 April 1991 (age 35); İzmir, Turkey
- Occupation: Actress
- Years active: 2011–present
- Spouse: Barış Yurtcu (m. 2019; div. 2026)

Deniz Baysal (born 5 April 1991) is a Turkish actress and model. She is best known for her leading roles in Taşacak Bu Deniz, Teşkilat and Söz and the drama series Fazilet Hanım ve Kızları.

== Life and career ==
Baysal was born in İzmir. In 2009, she started to study foreign trade at Manisa Celal Bayar University. From the age of 10, she began to study acting at İzmir Karsiyaka Municipal Theater. She also worked as a theater actress for 10 years and started acting with the encouragement and support of the theater teacher.

In November 2018, Baysal got engaged to Barış Yurtcu, the lead singer of the band Kolpa, after a two-year relationship. The couple married on 6 September 2019. They divorced in September 2026.

== Filmography ==
Film
Year	title	Role	Notes
2016	Sol Şerit	Yasemin	Leading role
2017	Bamsı Beyrek	Banu Çiçek Hazan Camkiran/Egemen	Leading role
2019	7. Koğuştaki Mucize	Mine	Leading role
Streaming series
Year	title	Role	Notes
2015	Can Bedenden Çıkmayınca	Eylem	Leading role
2022	Kaçış	Elvin	Guest star
TV series
Year	title	Role	Notes
2011	Bitmeyen Şarkı	-	Supporting role
2011	Derin Sular	Nisan	Leading role
2012	Babalar ve Evlatlar	Ferah	Supporting role
2012	Kayıp Şehir	Şehnaz	Supporting role
2013	Aşk Ekmek Hayaller	Karaca Yılmaz	Supporting role
2014–2015	Kaçak Gelinler	Kainat Gencer	Leading role
2015	Beyaz Yalan	Alara Korel/Melek Yılmaz	Leading role
2016	Sevda Kuşun Kanadında	Tümay Erbay	Leading role
2016	Rüzgarın Kalbi	Zeynep	Leading role
2017–2018	Fazilet Hanım ve Kızları	Hazan Çamkıran	Leading role
2018–2019	Söz	Derya Karasu	Leading role
2020	Hizmetçiler	Ela Sönmez	Leading role
2021–2023	Teşkilat	Zehra Balaban	Leading role
2023–2024	Ne Gemiler Yaktım	Yasemin Durulmaz	Leading role
2024	Kalpazan	Ayşe Günsoy	Leading role
2025–present	Taşacak Bu Deniz	Esme Er/ Furtuna/ Koçari	Leading role
