= Ushan Çakır =

Turkish actor

- Born: 23 May 1984 (age 42); İzmir, Turkey
- Education: Istanbul State Conservatory
- Years active: 2005–present
- Height: 1.80 m (5 ft 11 in)

Ushan Çakır (born 23 May 1984) is a Turkish actor. He became known for the character Arda he played in hit surreal comedy Leyla and Mecnun in 2011. Ushan Çakır graduated from Istanbul State Conservatory and has participated in a number of dramatic performances as well as playing theater.

== Filmography ==
Year	Title	Role
2005	Belalı Baldız	Barış
2006	Başka Semtin Çocukları	
2008–2009	Gece Gündüz	Yavuz/Damat Ferit
2011	Celal Tan ve Ailesinin Aşırı Acıklı Hikayesi	Okan
2011	Dedemin İnsanları	Büyük Ozan
2012	Uzun Hikaye	Mustafa
2011–2012	Leyla ile Mecnun	Arda
2013	Sev Beni	Cemal
2013	20 Dakika	Özgür
2014	Kurt Seyit ve Şura	Celil Kamilof
2015	Kara Ekmek	Çetin
2016	Muhteşem Yüzyıl: Kösem	Hezârfen Ahmed Çelebi
2017	Kara Yazı	Mehmet
2017	Cingöz Recai: Bir Efsanenin Dönüşü	Arsen
2018	Masum Değiliz	Volkan
2018	Ufak Tefek Cinayetler	Emre Çelen
2018	Avlu	Tolga
2019	Ferhat ile Şirin	Sadık
2020	Rise of Empires: Ottoman	Zagan Pasha
2020	Ya İstiklal Ya Ölüm	Salih Bozok
2020	Menajerimi Ara	Himself
2021	Sen Hiç Ateşböceği Gördün mü?	Hazım
2021	Kahraman Babam	Cem
2021	İlk ve Son	
2021	Love Me Instead	Inspector
2022	Cezailer	Nazif
2022	LCV (Lütfen Cevap Veriniz)	Semih
2023	Aile	Ati

== Theater ==
- Iska : Fuat Mete - Krek - 2013 / 2014
- The Gingerbread House : Mark Schultz - Tiyatro Yan Etki - 2012
- Korku Tüneli : Philip Ridley - Tiyatro Sıfır Nokta İki - 2010
- Some Voices : Joe Penhall - Tiyatro Sıfır Nokta İki - 2010
- At Sea : Sławomir Mrożek - Kent Oyuncuları - 2007
- Line : Israel Horovitz - Kent Oyuncuları - 2007
- Anna Karenina : Leo Tolstoy/Helen Edmundson - Kent Oyuncuları - 2006

== Awards ==
- 20th Sadri Alışık Theater and Cinema Awards - The Most Successful Theater Actor of the Year in a Supporting Role (Drama) (Göl Kıyısı, Talimhane Tiyatrosu)
- 2016 - 20th Afife Theater Awards, "Most Successful Actor of the Year in a Supporting Role" (Göl Kıyısı)
