= Gürbey İleri =

Turkish actor

- Born: 13 February 1988 (age 37); Istanbul, Turkey
- Education: Beykent University
- Occupation: Actor
- Years active: 2007–present

Gürbey İleri (born 13 February 1988) is a Turkish actor known for his role as "Sancar Bey" in Diriliş: Ertuğrul and "Şehzade Mehmed" in Muhteşem Yüzyıl.

== Biography ==
İleri is a graduate of Beykent University with a degree in acting. He started his career in 2007 with a supporting role in the teen drama Arka Sıradakiler. He made his cinematic debut in 2008 with Ayakta Kal, in which he portrayed the character of Berkin. After briefly appearing in the series Kalbim Seni Seçti, his breakthrough came with his role in the historical drama Muhteşem Yüzyıl as Şehzade Mehmed. Between 2014 and 2015, he was a regular on the series Kaderimin Yazıldığı Gün alongside Özcan Deniz and Hatice Şendil. In 2015, he appeared as Asım on TRT 1 series Sevda Kuşun Kanadında. Between 2017 and 2018, he had a recurring role in the historical drama Diriliş: Ertuğrul.

== Filmography ==
=== Television ===
- Arka Sıradakiler, 2007–2011 (Kerem)
- Kalbim Seni Seçti, 2011 (Kaan)
- Muhteşem Yüzyıl, 2012–2013 (Şehzade Mehmed)
- Yasak, 2014
- Kaderimin Yazıldığı Gün, 2014–2015 (Kerem)
- Eve Dönüş, 2015–2016 (Aras)
- Sevda Kuşun Kanadında, 2015–2016 (Asım)
- Diriliş: Ertuğrul, 2017–2018 (Sancar Bey)

=== Film ===
- Ayakta Kal, 2008 (Berkin)
- Özgür Dünya, 2019 (Fatih)
- Ali, 2019 (Ali)
