= Sinem Öztürk =

Turkish actress and presenter (born 1985)

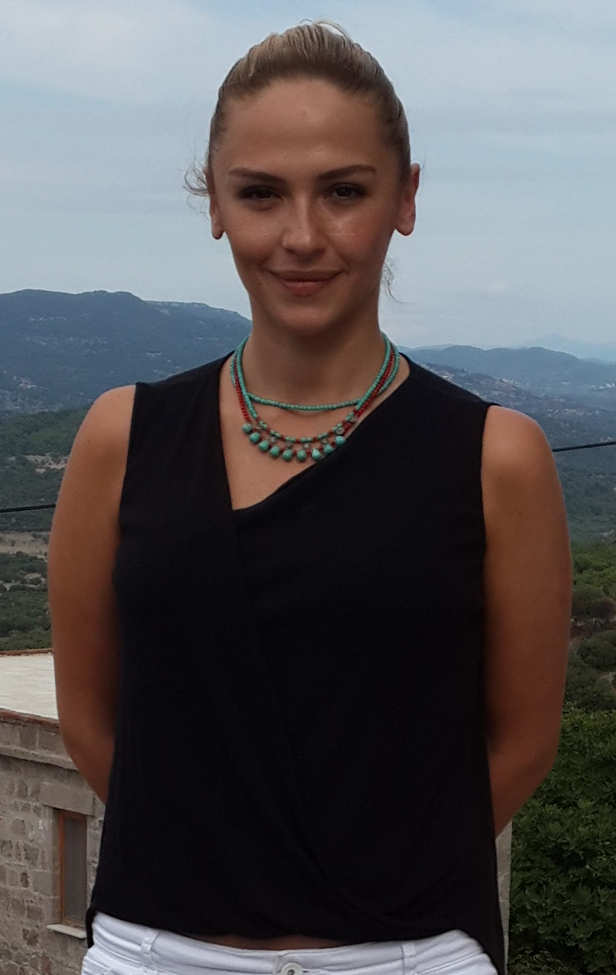
- Öztürk in September 2015
- Born: Gözde Sinem Öztürk; 9 January 1985 (age 41); Istanbul, Turkey
- Occupations: Actress, TV presenter
- Years active: 2004–present
- Spouse(s): Serkan Balbal (2008–2010); Gürsel Şatır (2013–2014); Mustafa Uslu (2016–present)
- Children: 2

Gözde Sinem Öztürk (born 9 January 1985) is a Turkish actress and presenter. Between 2007-2012, She played in youth series Arka Sıradakiler. She notably played the fashionably conservative role of Sukran in Turking TV series Huzur Sokağı (2012–14).

== Biography ==
Sinem Öztürk was born on 9 January 1985 in Istanbul, Öztürk was raised in Adapazarı, Marmara Region, before her family moved to Germany. Öztürk attended the Gutenberg-Gymnasium in Wiesbaden and studied management at the University of Mainz. Following her diploma, she moved back to Istanbul, where she started her acting career.

== Filmography ==
Year	Name	Role	Notes
2004	Beyaza Boyanmış Siyah Kelimeler		Short film
2006	Aşk Ruleti		Short film
2006	Aloya	Emine	Movie
2007	Ayak Altında	Belgin	Short film
2007	Duvar	İklim	Series
2007–2012	Arka Sıradakiler	Gamze	Series
2009	Uygun Adım Aşk	Gamze	Series
2010	Dersimiz: Atatürk	Öğretmen	Movie
2010	Uçan Melekler	Eda	
2012–2014	Huzur Sokağı	Şükran	Series
2014–2015	Hayat Yolunda	Melis Saka	Series
2015	Yusuf Yusuf	Hatice	
2015–2017	Kiralık Aşk	Yasemin	Series
2016	Paramparça	Selma	Series
2017	Kurtlar Vadisi Vatan	Deniz	Movie
2017	Ayla	Gazeteci Özge	Movie
2018	Diriliş: Ertuğrul	Mahperi Hatun	Series
2021	Menajerimi Ara	Herself	Series
2021	Evlilik Hakkında Her Şey	Melisa	Series
