= Şebnem Sönmez =

Turkish actress

- Born: Tevhide Şebnem Sönmez; 5 June 1968 (age 57); Istanbul, Turkey
- Education: Istanbul State Conservatory
- Occupation: Actress
- Years active: 1993–present
- Spouse: Olgun Şimşek (m. 1996; div. 2000)

Şebnem Sönmez (born 5 June 1968) is a Turkish theater, movie and television actress. She is best known for hit period series Elveda Rumeli and hit youth series 7 Numara alongside ex-husband Olgun Şimşek. She started her career playing in theater in the Istanbul Pendik Youth Theatre while still a high school student. She performed in groups such as Kartal Art Theatre and Taner Barlas Mim Theatre. After completing and having her diploma from Istanbul State Conservatory, she worked in Dormen Theatre. She then moved on to television roles as she continued her theater experience in Besiktas Cultural Center. She has also taught theater at the kindergarten through high school level and founded the "Yaz Tiyatrosu" (Summer Theatre) group in her school while she continued her acting work.

== Acting career ==
Film
Year	Title	Role	Notes
2000	Vizontele	Gülizar	
2002	Abdülhamit Düşerken	Çeşmifelek Kalfa	
2005	Döngel Karhanesi	Sevgi	
2007	İyi Seneler Londra		
2009	Beş Şehir	Kedi	
2011	Aşk Tesadüfleri Sever	Neriman Turgut	
2011	Toprağın Çocukları		
2011	Türkan		
2022	Bergen	Suna	
2022	Sevmedim Deme		
2023	Sevda Mecburi İstikamet		Guest appearance
2023	Cenazemize Hoş Geldiniz	Gülşen	
Television
Year	Title	Role	Notes
1993	Yaz Evi	Nurşen	
1995	Bir Demet Tiyatro	Mücver	
1998	Dış Kapının Mandalları	Nezaket	
2000	Güneş Yanıkları	Sinem	
2000	Çarli İş Başında	Nalan	
2000-2003	Yedi Numara	Zeliha Ballıoğlu	Leading Role
2004	Perili Ev	Sevgi	
2004	Avrupa Yakası	Nadide	Guest appearance
2005	Sen misin Değil misin?	Nükhet	
2006	Erkekler Ağlamaz	Ramize	
2006	Bir Demet Tiyatro	Mücver Abla	
2007	Elveda Rumeli	Fatma	.
2008	Elveda Rumeli	Fatma	
2009	Elveda Rumeli	Fatma	.
2009	Acemi Müezzin	Tevhide Hala	
2019	Çarpışma	Asiye Karaca	
2022	Gizli Saklı	Aynur	
Theatre
Year	Title	Role	Notes
1994	Alo Arkadaş		Dormen Theatre
1999	The Balcony		Tiyatro Stüdyosu
2000	Sesler Ziller Bizler		Kent Oyuncuları
2001	Sen Hiç Ateşböceği Gördün mü?		BKM
2003	Ben Anadolu		Istanbul City Theatres
2005	Cimri		Oyun Atölyesi
2006	Bana Mastikayı Çalsana		Aysa Production Theatre
2011	Düğün		Aysa Production Theatre
2016	Bütün Kadınların Kafası Karışıktır		

== Awards ==
Awards
Year	Award	Category	Result	For
1999	Afife Theatre Award	best supporting actress	Won	Sen Hiç Ateşböceği Gördün mü?
2005	Afife Theatre Award	best supporting Musical/Comedy actress	Won	Cimri
