= Bülent İnal =

Turkish actor (born 1973)

- Born: Mehmet Bülent İnal; 19 May 1973 (age 53); Şanlıurfa, Turkey
- Occupation: Actor
- Spouse: Melis Tüysüz (m. 2011)
- Children: 1

Mehmet Bülent İnal (born 19 May 1973) is a Turkish actor.

He graduated from Ege University and Dokuz Eylül University Department of Theatre.

== Filmography ==
Cinema
Year	Title	Role	Notes
1998	Kayıkçı	Hasan	
2000	Dar Alanda Kısa Paslaşmalar	Mustafa Ateş	
2001	Hiçbiryerde	Polis	
2003	Vizontele Tuuba	Mahmut Duran	
2005	Cenneti Beklerken	Gazal	
2008	Başka Semtin Çocukları	Kerim	
2008	Akşamdan Kalma	Emin	
2010	Akşamdan Kalma 2	Emin	
2012	Akşamdan Kalma 3	Emin	
2012	Taş Mektep		
2013	Balık	Kaya	
2024	Hayat'la Barış	Yılmaz	
Television
Year	Title	Role	Notes
1992	Mahallenin Muhtarları		Guest appearance
2000	Dikkat Bebek Var	Recep	
2000	Yedi Numara		Guest appearance
2001	Cesur Kuşku		
2001	Karanlıkta Koşanlar	Nuri	
2002	Azad	Azad	
2002	Aşk ve Gurur	Balıkçı	
2003	Kurşun Yarası	Kaymakam Cemal	
2004	Bir Aşk Hikayesi	İsmail	TV film
2005	Aşk Yolu	Ömer Laçiner	TV film
2005	Ihlamurlar Altında	Yılmaz Akın	
2007	Kara Yılan	Kara Yılan	
2008	Kalpsiz Adam	Oktay	
2009	Bu Kalp Seni Unutur mu?	Sinan Şahin	
2010	Bitmeyen Şarkı	Yaman	
2011	Bir Çocuk Sevdim	Timur	
2013–2014	Tatar Ramazan	Tatar Ramazan	
2014–2014	Urfalıyam Ezelden	Cemal Bozoğlu	
2016	Babam ve Ailesi	Kemal İpekçi	
2017	Son Destan	Destan	
2017–2021	Payitaht: Abdülhamid	Abdul Hamid II	Leading role
2023	Mevlana	Mevlana	Leading role
2024-2025	Can Borcu	Mehmet Musluoglu	Leading role
2025–2026	Kiskanmak	Savci Cihan	Supporting role
2026	Ömür Usta	Tunç Arıkan	
