= Burdur Mehmet Akif Ersoy University =

Public university located in Burdur, Turkey

Coordinates: 37.7167°N 30.2833°E

Mehmet Akif Ersoy University
- Mehmet Akif Ersoy Üniversitesi
- Type: Public
- Established: 2006
- Rector: Prof. Dr. Adem Korkmaz
- Administrative staff: 1650
- Students: 28,974
- Location: Burdur, Turkey
- Colors: Navy blue and red
- Website: Official website

Burdur Mehmet Akif Ersoy University (Turkish: Burdur Mehmet Akif Ersoy Üniversitesi), abbreviated as MAKU, is a public university located in Burdur, Turkey. It was established in 2006. It is named after Mehmet Akif Ersoy.

== History ==
Mehmet Akif Ersoy University was founded on 17 March 2006. The following were connected to Suleyman Demirel University: Burdur Education Faculty, Burdur School of Health, Burdur Vocational School, Bucak Hikmet Tolunay Vocational School, Gölhisar Vocational School, Bucak Emin Gülmez Technical Science Vocational School, and Ağlasun Vocational School. Burdur Veterinary Faculty was connected to Akdeniz University. All were then transferred to Mehmet Akif Ersoy University. The Faculty of Letters, Institutes of Social Sciences, Science and Technology, Health Sciences were founded by the same law.

Also founded were the Continuing Education Research and Application Center, Strategic Researches Application and Research Center, Teke Location Folk Culture Application and Research Center, and Mehmet Akif Ersoy Application and Research Center. In addition to Research and Application Centers; Atatürk’s Principles and History of Turkish Revolution Department, Physical Education and Sports Department, Informatics Department, Fine Arts Department, Turkish Language Department and Foreign Languages Department are active within rectorship.

Mehmet Akif Ersoy University includes four institutions which have graduate training programs, five faculties and two higher schools which have undergraduate training programs, and six vocational schools, four research centers, six departments connected to rectorship, 16,500 students and 1000 personnel.

== Campus ==
=== Accommodation ===
There are dormitories attached to the General Directorate of Higher Education Credit and Dormitories.

=== Food ===
The food needs of the students, academics and administrative personnel are provided by dieticians from central dining hall in campus and dining halls of higher schools in towns, calculating the students’ and personnel’s calorie needs. Canteens and cafeterias offer services in the faculties and higher schools.

=== Health ===
Health Services for students are met by healthcare organizations in Burdur and its provinces. Students can receive aid from any medical personnel who work in the Directorate of Health, Culture and Sports Department.

=== Culture ===
Social activities are carried out through cooperative studies of the clubs established by Academic Units and the student and the Directorate of Health, Culture and Sports Department.

Conferences, seminars, panels and other activities are held with the participation of guests who have a national and international reputation.

Theatre, music, folk dance, exhibitions, colloquies are held at Science, Project and Spring Festivals in May every year. The students have an opportunity to express themselves with the activities held, shows performed by units and concerts.

=== Recreation ===
Cinema, operating at the University Continuing Education Center, lets students watch Turkish and foreign movies.

== Academics ==
=== Faculties ===
- Faculty of Education
- Faculty of Veterinary Medicine
- Faculty of Arts and Science
- Faculty of Economics and Administrative Sciences
- Dean of the Faculty of Engineering and Architecture

=== Institutes ===
- Institute of Science and Technology
- Institute of Health Sciences
- Institute of Social Sciences
- Institute of Educational Sciences

=== Schools ===
- Bucak Zeliha Tolunay Higher School of Applied Technology and Management
- Bucak School of Health
- School of Health
- School of Physical Education and Sports
- School of Foreign Languages
- School of Tourism and Hotel Management

== Student life ==
Sports services are maintained by the HCS Sports Services Unit, coordinated with the Physical Education and Sports Department in the Faculty of Education.

=== Student Council ===
Mehmet Akif Ersoy University Students Council is the only legal body representing about 16,500 students at Mehmet Akif Ersoy University. It has 13 members from three faculties, two schools, three institutes and six vocational schools.

Responsibilities of Mehmet Akif Ersoy University Students Council include

- protecting the rights of the students regarding the meeting and improvement of their educational, health, sports and cultural needs,
- ensuring that the students are sensitive in terms of national interest,
- delivering the expectations and demands of the students to the administrative bodies,
- ensuring the participation of the students in the making of decisions on education.

In addition to those main responsibilities, Mehmet Akif Ersoy University Students Council organizes events to contribute to the social and cultural development of the students.

=== Students Clubs ===
Clubs arrange activities such as concerts, courses, exhibitions, festivals, conferences, panels, symposium, knowledge contests, seminars, shows, music and poem concerts, and trips.
