= Engin Alkan =

Turkish actor (born 1965)

- Born: 27 July 1965 (age 60); Samatya, Turkey
- Occupations: Actor, director
- Years active: 1984–present

Engin Alkan (born 27 July 1965) is a Turkish actor. He has served at the Istanbul City Theatres as an actor and director. He is best known for hit comedy series 7 Numara.

== Biography ==
Between 1984–1989, he studied acting at the Istanbul Municipal Conservatory Theatre Department and Istanbul University State Conservatory Theatre Department. Starting from 1996, he worked as an instructor and head of theatre departments in various acting schools. He still continues acting and directing works at Istanbul City Theatres, which he has been a member of since 1985. He has also worked as a voice actor on the Turkish version of various movies and animations, Papa Smurf in The Smurfs, Samwise Gamgee in The Lord of the Rings, Puss in Boots in Shrek and Braum in League of Legends. He has continued his career by appearing in various cinema and television productions.

== Theatre ==
=== As actor ===
- Şark Dişçisi - Nazim Hikmet Theatre - 2016
- Şekerpare - Istanbul City Theatres - 2015
- Huysuz: Engin Alkan - Aysa Prodüksiyon Tiyatrosu - 2013
- The Cherry Orchard: Anton Chekhov - Istanbul City Theatres - 2012
- Oh, oh, Juliet: Ephraim Kishon - Istanbul City Theatres - 2010
- Avenue Q: Park Müzikhol - 2009
- İstanbul Efendisi: Musahipzade Celal - Istanbul City Theatres - 2008
- Profesör ve Hulahop: Nesrin Kazankaya - Tiyatro Pera - 2008
- Keşanlı Ali Destanı: Haldun Taner - Istanbul City Theatres - 2007
- Danton's Death: Georg Büchner - Istanbul City Theatres - 2005
- Exit the King: Eugène Ionesco - Istanbul City Theatres - 2003
- Herkes Aynı Bahçede: Anton Chekhov\ Başar Sabuncu - Istanbul City Theatres - 2001
- Peace: Aristophanes - Istanbul City Theatres - 2000
- Arslan'a Benzer: Rüstem İbrahimbeyov - Istanbul City Theatres - 2000
- Waiting for Godot: Samuel Beckett - Istanbul City Theatres - 1998
- Ayrılık: Behiç Ak - Istanbul City Theatres - 1997
- War and Peace: Leo Tolstoy\Erwin Piscator - Istanbul City Theatres
- Peynirli Yumurta: Ferenc Karinthy - Istanbul City Theatres
- Askerliğim: Neil Simon - Istanbul City Theatres
- Six Degrees of Separation: John Guare - Istanbul City Theatres
- Evita: Andrew Lloyd Webber/Tim Rice - Istanbul City Theatres
- Deli Eder İnsanı Bu Dünya: Erkan Akın - Istanbul City Theatres
- Bir Garip Oyun: Ülker Köksal - Istanbul City Theatres
- The Birds: Aristophanes - Istanbul City Theatres
- Genç Osman: Turan Oflazoğlu - Istanbul City Theatres
- Döne Döne: Claude Magnier - Istanbul City Theatres
- Ya Devlet Başa Ya Kuzgun Leşe: Orhan Asena - Istanbul City Theatres
- Uncle Vanya: Anton Chekhov - Tiyatrosu Odas
- The Birthday Party: Harold Pinter - Tiyat Odası
- Günlük Müstehcen Sırlar: P. Bloch\O. Schultze - Tiyatro Pati
- Exit the King: Eugène Ionesco - Tiyatro Odası
- Tütünün Zararları: Anton Chekhov - Tiyatro Odası
- Stalin'grattan Son Mektuplar: Engin Alkan - Tiyatro Odası
- Julius Caesar: William Shakespeare - Istanbul City Theatres
- Look Back in Anger: John Osborne - Istanbul State Conservatory
- Mikado'nun Çöpleri: Melih Cevdet Anday - Istanbul State Conservatory
- Hansel and Gretel: Vecihi Karamehmet Theatre
- Ayının Feryadı Avcıyı Yendi: Istanbul City Theatres
- Pied Piper of Hamelin: Istanbul City Theatres
- Mavi Masal: Istanbul City Theatres
- Sırık Obur Camgöz: Istanbul City Theatres
- Gölgenin Canı: Istanbul City Theatres

=== As director ===
- Şekerpare - Istanbul City Theatres - 2015
- Huysuz: Engin Alkan - Aysa Production Theatre - 2013
- Küskün Müzikal: Engin alkan - Emek Sahnesi - 2013
- The Cherry Orchard: Anton Chekhov - Istanbul City Theatres - 2012
- Şark Dişçisi: Hagop Baronian - Istanbul City Theatres - 2011
- Generaller Savaş ve Barbekü: Boris Vian - Tiyatro Adam - 2011
- Oh, oh, Juliet: Ephraim Kishon - Istanbul City Theatres - 2010
- Alemdar: Orhan Asena - Istanbul City Theatres - 2010
- Macbeth and Hecate: William Shakespeare - Istanbul City Theatres - 2010
- İstanbul Efendisi: Musahipzade Celal - Istanbul City Theatres - 2008
- The House of Bernarda Alba: Federico García Lorca - Istanbul City Theatres - 2007
- Woman Like Me: Curzio Malaparte - 2005
- Ben Anadolu: Güngör Dilmen - Istanbul City Theatres - 2003
- Exit the King: Eugène Ionesco - Istanbul City Theatres - 2002
- Antigone: Sophocles - MSM Oyuncuları - 2001
- The Cherry Orchard: Anton Chekhov - MSM Oyuncuları - 2000
- Saltanat: Kolaj - MSM Oyuncuları - 1999
- Dönüşüm: Performans Çalışması - MSM Oyuncuları - 1998
- Çizgi: Performans Çalışması - MSM Oyuncuları
- Tebeşi Dairesi: Klabunt - MSM Oyuncuları
- Metro Canavarı: G. Gür - Istanbul City Theatres
- Küskün Kahvenin Türküsü: E. Alkan/Mc Cullers - Tiyatro Pati
- The Good Doctor: Neil Simon - Sahakyan Nunyan Cultural Association

== Filmography ==
=== Film ===
- Kaç Para Kaç: Reha Erdem
- Çamur: Derviş Zaim
- Bu Son Olsun: Orçun Benli
- Güz Sancısı: Tomris Giritlioğlu
- Sen Hiç Ateşböceği Gördün mü?: Andaç Haznedaroğlu

=== Television ===
- Aşağı Yukarı Yemişliler
- Deli Saraylı
- Ayda
- Erkekler Ağlamaz
- Çeşmi Bülbül
- Tarçın Konuştu
- Sana Bayılıyorum
- Kısa Devre
- Yarım Elma
- Yedi Numara
- Uğurlu Giller
- Küçük Mutluluklar
- Baba Bana Reyting Al
- Yonca
- Ters Köşe
- Ruhumun Aynası
- Mert ile Gert
- Kardeş Çocukları
- İkimizin Sırrı
- İlk ve Son

== Awards ==
- 2012 Theatre Magazine Awards "Director of the Year Award", Şark Dişçisi - Istanbul City Theatres - 2012
- 37th İsmet Küntay Theatre Awards "Most Successful Director of the Year", Şark Dişçisi - Istanbul City Theatres - 2012
- Suna Pekuysal Theatre Awards "Most Successful Director of the Year", Şark Dişçisi - Istanbul City Theatres - 2012
- TOBAV Awards "Most Successful Director of the Year", Şark Dişçisi - Istanbul City Theatres - 2012
- 16th Sadri Alışık Awards "Best Comedy Director of the Year", Generaller Savaş ve Barbekü - Tiyatro Adam - 2011
- 12th Crimea Bosporskiye Agoni Theatre Festival - "Best Play Director", İstanbul Efendisi - Istanbul City Theatres - 2010
- İstek Foundation Awards - "Best Director of the Year", Kral Ölüşüyor - Istanbul City Theatres - 2003
- Selim Naşit Özcan Awards - "Best Supporting Actor", Herkes Aynı Bahçede - Istanbul City Theatres - 2002
- Nasreddin Hoca Mizah Grand Awards - 7 Numara - Dizi Film - 2001
- Atlan Erbulak Awards - "Most Successful Actor of the Year Award", Arslana Benzer - Istanbul City Theatres - 2000
- İştisan Awards - "Şaziye Moral Theatre Labor Award", Barış - Istanbul City Theatre - 2000
- Afife Theatre Awards - "Most Successful Musical or Comedy Actor of the Year", Barış - Istanbul City Theatre - 2000
- Avni Dilligil Awards - "Special Jury Award" - 1996
- Avni Dilligil Awards - "Best Actor in a Supporting Role", Savaş ve Barış - Istanbul City Theatre - 1996
- Avni Dilligil Awards - "Avni Dilligil Best Team Acting Award", Askerliğim - Istanbul City Theatre - 1995
