= Under Pressure and Pressure Drop =

1995 video game

Under Pressure; Pressure Drop
- Developer: Starhill Productions
- Publishers: Starhill Publications, SoftKey
- Platform: Windows
- Release: 1995
- Genre: Puzzle
- Mode: Single-player

Under Pressure and Pressure Drop are 1995 puzzle video games developed and released by Starhill Productions for Microsoft Windows. Both games were later packaged by SoftKey and released in 1997 Under Pressure and Pressure Drop. Pressure Drop was one of the first titles branded with the Windows 95 logo and marketed as for the operating system. Upon release, both titles received average reviews: Under Pressure was both praised and critiqued for its challenge due to its time limits, and Pressure Drop received praise for its concept and gameplay, and critique for its visuals.

== Gameplay ==
Gameplay screenshot

In Pressure Drop, players must shoot groups of blocks with the same color that fall from the top of the screen with a 'chromagun': a gun that fires pellets of different colors that can be switched. Players must shoot the blocks to align the shade of all the squares in each group before they hit a bar at the bottom of the screen. Successfully shooting blocks lowers the vertical position of the bar, giving the player more time. The game features 20 zones, each with a different background. There are power-ups that can help players destroy all bricks onscreen or increase the score.

In Under Pressure, players must push colored chips on grids into 'energy tanks' located on the screen within a time limit. The game features power-ups to transport or change chips, bonuses to extend the time limit, and obstacles to block the player's passage. The game features 60 levels, and contains a password save system to access levels at the start of the game.

== Development ==
Pressure Drop was one of the first games for Windows 95 released and marketed with the logo of the operating system. Both games were also included on a compilation disc titled Games For Windows published by Microsoft in January 1995.

== Reception ==
Under Pressure

Review scores
Publication	Score
Computer Game Review	75%
PC Gamer (US)	68%
Home PC	3/5
PC Entertainment	1.6/5

Pressure Drop

Review scores
Publication	Score
Computer Gaming World	2.5/5
PC Entertainment	3.25/5

Both Under Pressure and Pressure Drop received average reviews. Writers for Computer Game Review disagreed on the merit of Under Pressure: some found it satisfying and had replay value, whilst others felt the game was challenging and the premise was too simple. Fredric Paul of PC Entertainment critiqued the game's balky [sic] mouse controls. All critics remarked that the time limits were very challenging, with Home PC stating that the game's "time limit and mouse manuevers make it for frenetically frustrating fun". PC Gamer also critiqued the demanding performance of the game.

Computer Gaming World praised Pressure Drop as a fun game that is "easy to learn and quickly draws you in", but felt it had average graphics and low replay value, also stating that the visuals were "fuzzy" and lacked an overarching theme. PC Entertainment praised the game's concept, sound and visuals, but felt the target squares were 'so small that the game becomes an exercise in squinting instead of primal reactions".
