= Bir Çocuk Sevdim =

- Genre: Family drama
- Written by: Gaye Boralıoğlu; Sema Ali Erol; Figen Şakacı; Emine Algan; Ümit Kıvanç
- Directed by: Cevdet Mercan
- Starring: Bülent İnal; Çetin Tekindor; Gülcan Arslan; Hakan Kurtaş
- Country of origin: Turkey
- Original language: Turkish
- No. of seasons: 1
- No. of episodes: 39

Production
- Producer: Timur Savcı
- Production location: Istanbul
- Running time: 90 minutes
- Production company: TMC

Original release
- Network: Kanal D (2011); Star TV (2012)
- Release: September 9, 2011 – June 18, 2012

Bir Çocuk Sevdim is a Turkish drama television series produced by Turkish Media Corporation (TMC Film) starring Bülent İnal, Çetin Tekindor, Gülcan Arslan and Hakan Kurtaş. It premiered on September 9, 2011 and ended on June 18, 2012.

== Plot ==
Turan and Esmahan have three children: Emine, the unmarried oldest daughter, Erdal, a silly son and Mine, the younger daughter who is beautiful and romantic. They seem to have a happy middle-class family, notwithstanding some issues arising from Emine being jealous of Mine and being unable to get married. Mine is in love with Sinan, a young man from a rich family. Sinan has just finished his university and is planning to go America for further studies. Mine and Sinan are deeply in love with each other and they don't care about their different family backgrounds and want to live together in harmony for a long time. Neither Mine's, nor Sinan's, parents know about their relationship. However, a shopkeeper from Mine's neighbourhood catches Mine sitting with Sinan in his car and tells her father, Turan. As Mine comes from a conservative family, this makes Turan furious and he visits Mine's college. Her class fellows tell Turan that Mine hasn't come to college for the past few days. Turan confronts Mine and warns her to be careful. After a few days later, Mine leaves to visit Sinan at his home, where she meets his father. She overhears the conversation between Sinan and his father, who was telling him that Mine is not on their standard and Sinan deserves someone better. Mine is disheartened hearing this and leaves without telling Sinan. When she comes back home, her father is furiously waiting for her, as it is midnight. He yells at her asking her where she had been, and she faints. Her family takes her to the hospital where they come to know that Mine is pregnant with Sinan's child. This leaves Mine's family furious and very upset. Mine's father takes her phone away and locks her in her room when she refuses to tell him who the father of the child is. Sinan keeps trying to contact Mine by calling her and messaging her.

== Cast ==
Actor/Actress	Character
Bülent İnal	Timur Gurhan
Çetin Tekindor	Turan Senol
Gülcan Arslan	Mine Senol Gurhan
Hakan Kurtaş	Sinan
Şefika Ümit Tolun	Esmahan Senol
Onuryay Evrentan	Emine Senol
Arzu Gamze Kılınç	Süreyya
Gülçin Santırcıoğlu	Sebahat
İnan Ulaş Torun	Erdal Sinol
Müjde Uzman	Derin
Ezgi Çelik	Ayten
Cansu Koç	Funda Sinol
Bülent Alkış	Kerem
İlayda Alişan	Merve Gurhan
Saydam Yeniay	Bekir
Mine Tüfekçioğlu	Seda
Uğur Demirpehlivan	Sevim
Yiğit Kutlu Öztürk	Deniz
Aybars Kartal Özson	Hasan
Hüseyin Taş	Berber
Derya Beşerler	Narin
Görkem Türkeş	Serkan
Ufuk Aşar	Manav Şükrü
Serap Eyüboğlu	Saniye

== International broadcasts ==
Country	Network	Premiere date	Original name
Northern Cyprus	Kanal D (2011); Star TV	September 9, 2011	Bir Çocuk Sevdim
Greece	Mega Channel	November 27, 2012	Το Κορίτσι που Αγάπησα
North Macedonia	Kanal 5	2012	Девојката која ја сакав
Arab League	OSN	2012	أحببت طفلة
Lebanon	LBCI	December 12, 2012	
Pakistan	Express Entertainment	September 23, 2013	Meenay - Mera Pyaar
Bulgaria	Diema Family	December 9, 2013	Момичето, което обичах
Israel	Viva	2015	The Girl I Loved
