= Olgun Şimşek =

Turkish actor (born 1971)

- Born: 1 June 1971 (age 54); Yenice, Bursa, Turkey
- Occupation: Actor
- Years active: 1990–present
- Spouses: Şebnem Sönmez (m. 1996; div. 2000) Zeynep Kocabeyoğlu (m. 2011)

Olgun Şimşek (born 1 June 1971) is a Turkish actor.

== Biography ==
Olgun Şimşek was born in the village of Yenice in Büyükorhan, Bursa. His father is an Alevi Kurd from Bingöl; his mother is a Sunni Turkmen from Bursa. His father was a primary school teacher and his mother was a housewife. He graduated in theatre from the Istanbul University State Conservatory and began acting professionally in 1993.

Şimşek acted in the play Otogargara with Demet Akbağ and Yılmaz Erdoğan. He had a small parts in the films Tersine Dünya in 1993 and Yer Çekimli Aşıklar in 1995. In 1998, he acted in the film Karışık Pizza for which he won the Most Promising Actor award at the Ankara Film Festival. In 2004, he starred in the film Yazı Tura directed by Uğur Yücel where he played a disabled soldier. For this, he won several awards including the Golden Orange for Best Actor as well as Best Actor awards at the Ankara Film Festival, Istanbul Film Festival, Adana Golden Coccoon Festival and the SİYAD awards.

Şimşek also had appearances in television series such as Sihirli Ceket, Beşik Kertmesi ve Alacakaranlık. He played in hit youth comedy Yedi Numara alongside ex-wife Şebnem Sönmez. He played two different roles in hit sitcom series Yalan Dünya.

== Filmography ==
- 1993: Tersine Dünya - TV series
- 1993: Tetikçi Kemal - TV series
- 1994: Aziz Ahmet - TV series
- 1994: Gülşen Abi - TV series
- 1995: Yer Çekimli Aşklar - TV series
- 1996: Sihirli Ceket - TV series
- 1996: Sultanım - Erkan Yılbaş - TV series
- 1997: Bir Demet Tiyatro - Kudret/Bahattin - TV program
- 1998: Dış Kapının Mandalları - TV series
- 1998: Karışık Pizza - Murat - TV series
- 1998: Tatlı Rüyalar - Ali Haydar Akbayır - TV series
- 2001: Yeşil Işık - Ferdi
- 2002: Beşik Kertmesi - TV series
- 2000–2003: Yedi Numara - Sabit Ballıoğlu - TV series
- 2003: Alacakaranlık - Emir Büyükdereci - TV series
- 2003: Yazı Tura - Rıdvan
- 2005: Beyaz Gelincik - Aziz Kudret Tarhan - TV series
- 2005: Kapıları Açmak - Cihan - TV series
- 2008: Akşamdan Kalma - Hidayet
- 2009–2010: Kapalıçarşı - Mahmut - TV series
- 2010: Akşamdan Kalma 2 - Hidayet
- 2012: Gözetleme Kulesi - Nihat - TV series
- 2012: Yalan Dünya - Selahattin/Ahmet - TV series
- 2012: Akşamdan Kalma 3 - Hidayet
- 2017: Eşkıya Dünyaya Hükümdar Olmaz - Yaşar Kimsesiz - TV series
- 2017: Bana Söyleme - Yılmaz Akbağ - TV series
- 2020: Ramo - Cihangir Hanlı - TV series
- 2022: Cici - Netflix original film
- 2023: Terzi - Netflix original series
