= Sevda Dalgıç =

Turkish actress

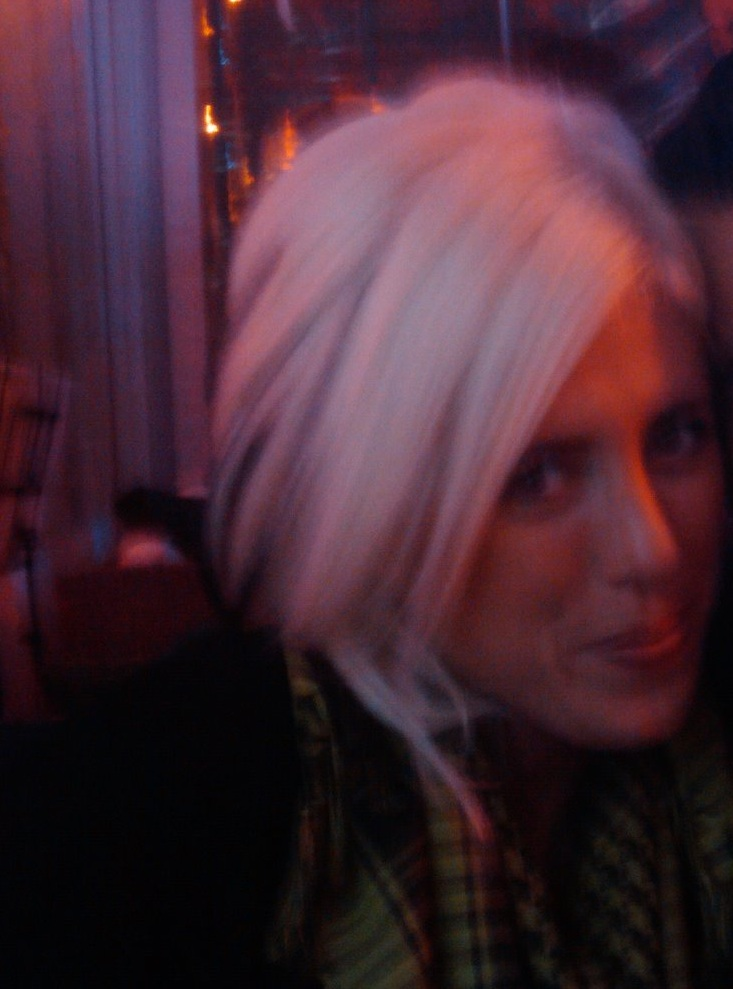
- Born: 23 February 1984 (age 41); Istanbul, Turkey
- Occupation: Actress
- Years active: 2005–present
- Website: Sevda Dalgıç Fan Site

Sevda Dalgıç is a Turkish film and stage actress, primarily known for her onscreen representation of Ozge in the hit FOX Network TV show Arka Sıradakiler. Sevda Dalgıç made her screen debut with the Turkish teenage high school drama called Arka Sıradakiler (literal translation “those who sit at the rear desks”.) Her reported weight is 53 kg (116.6 lbs.), shoe size 40, height 174 cm (5’ 9”), and eye color is hazel. She was born in Istanbul on 23 February 1984. Although she had dropped out of high school at an early age to support her family, she got enrolled in acting classes at Sadri Alisik Kultur Merkezi Oyunculuk Bolumu (Sadri Alisik Cultural Center Drama Department) later on her life. She studied drama and performing arts for two years at the same school. She is still pursuing an education in advanced acting. Her primary hobbies include, but not limited to, horseback riding, skating, dancing, and playing basketball. She played at her highschool basketball team before dropping out due to financial and family problems. In the 160th episode of Arka Sıradakiler, her character has died. After her departure from the TV show, she acted in the stage drama of a father-son relation and the complications they encountered due to the son being openly gay. The name of the drama is called “Eyvah ogluma bir haller oldu” (literal translation, “Oh something has happened to my son”.) The play generally received positive reviews from critics. Sevda Dalgıç is currently engaged to be married to his longtime boyfriend. Her early career includes jobs as a model, hairdresser, and cashier. She lives with her mother and 9 year old German Shepherd dog called Hera in Istanbul.
