= Bitmeyen Şarkı =

Turkish television series

- Also known as: Never Ending Song
- Written by: Deniz Akcay; Onur Ugras
- Directed by: Yasmin Turkmenli
- Starring: Bulent Inal; Bergüzar Korel; Betul Cobanoglu; Serhat Teoman
- Theme music composer: Febyo Tasel
- Country of origin: Turkey
- Original language: Turkish
- No. of seasons: 1
- No. of episodes: 32

Production
- Running time: 90 minutes (average)
- Production company: Gold Film

Original release
- Network: ATV
- Release: 23 August 2010 – 26 April 2011

Bitmeyen Şarkı (transl. Endless Song) is a Turkish Series featuring Bulent Inal as Yaman & Berguzar Korel as Feraye. This summer series includes the voice of Berguzar Korel.

== Synopsis ==
Feraye (Berguzar Korel) doesn't believe in beautiful days, people & Miracles. Her ultimate aim is to find her son who was taken away from her by force 8 years ago. Although, she works as a singer in a night club, she manages to maintain her innocence. She is beautiful, young & decent girl in her difficult and dark world. One day, in order to save her work place, she reluctantly accepts an invitation to a dinner on a luxury yacht with a powerful businessman. However, dinner doesn't go on according to the plan and Feraye had to jump into the sea. On the verge of death, she is saved by a young man Yaman (Bulent Inal). This accident which is the beginning of the hope for a greater love changes both the life of Yaman & Feraye.

In this love story you will explore a difficult love of Yaman and Feraye, who are made for each other yet from different worlds. How will Yaman reacts when he learns that Feraye is a singer in a night club. Will the love of Yaman and Feraye stand by the secret buried in Feraye's past ? Will Feraye manage to find her son ?

== Series overview ==
Season	Time slot	Season premiere	Season finale	No. of episodes	Section range	Season's years	TV channel
1	Mondays 20:00	23 August 2010	26 April 2011	32	1–32	2010–11	atv

== International broadcasters ==
After the major success of 1001 Nights in South America, Berguzar Korel's Endless Song will soon be available to South American world in Spanish language.

Country	Local name	Network	Premiere date
(Arab League) Arab World	أغنية الحب	MBC	2012
Kosovo	Kënga e Pambaruar	RTV21	2016
Somaliland	Xikmaddii Jacaylka	Horn Cable Television	2013
Albania	Kenga e Pambaruar	Tema TV	2019
Romania	Cântec fără sfârșit	Kanal D	2011–2012
