= Sevda Kılınç Çırakoğlu =

Turkish Paralympic athlete

Personal information
- Born: 25 May 1993 (age 33) Ankara, Turkey
- Education: Physical Education and Sport; Burdur Mehmet Akif Ersoy University

Sport
- Country: Turkey
- Sport: Paralympic athletics
- Disability: Visual impairment
- Disability class: T12
- Event(s): 400m, 1500m
- Club: Yenimahalle Belediyesi Visual Impaireds SC
Medal record
Track and field
Representing Turkey
| Gold medal – first place | 2021 Bydgoszcz | 400m T12 |

Sevda Kılınç Çırakoğlu (born 25 May 1993) is a Turkish female para athlete competing in the T12 disability class middle-distance events of 400m and 1500m.

== Private life ==
Sevda Kılınç Çırakoğlu was born in Ankara, Turkey on 25 May 1993. She studied Physical Education and Sport at Burdur Mehmet Akif Ersoy University.

== Sport career ==
Kılınç Çırakoğlu is a member of Yenimahalle Belediyesi Visual Impaireds Sport Club in Ankara.

She won the gold medal in the 1500m T12 event at the seventh leg of the 2019 IPC Para-Athletich World Grand Prix held in Tunisia. At the 2021 IPC Para-Athletics World Grand Prix in Dubaş, United Arab Emirates, she captured the gold medal in the 400m T12 event, and set a new Turkish national record with 59.16. She took the gold medal in the 400m T12 event of the 2021 World Para Athletics European Championships in Bydgoszcz, Poland.
