= Bülent Çetinaslan =

Turkish actor

- Born: 25 May 1974 (age 50); Eryaman, Ankara, Turkey
- Occupation: Actor
- Years active: 2007–present

Bülent Çetinaslan (born 25 May 1974) is a Turkish actor and former model. He is mostly recognized for his performances in Duvar (2007) as Taylan and subsequently Arka Sıradakiler (2007–2012) as Oktay Karaca.

== Career ==
He graduated his primary and high school in Ankara. He never attended university but instead worked as a professional volleyball player for various teams. He began his acting career with Ayla Algan. After that he carried on his education in Kenter Theatre.

== Filmography ==
Television
Year	Title	Role	Notes
1995	Çiçek Taksi	Hasan	Guest appearance
2004	Melekler Adası	Cem	Supporting role
2005	Acı Hayat	Pill seller	Guest appearance
2007	Duvar	Taylan	Leading role
2007–2012	Arka Sıradakiler	Oktay	Leading role
2010	Öğretmen Kemal	Oktay	Guest appearance
