= Pelin Akil =

Turkish actress (born 1986)

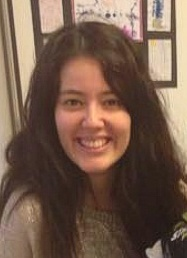
- Born: 17 April 1986 (age 39); Istanbul, Turkey
- Occupation: Actress
- Spouse: Anıl Altan (m. 2016; div. 2025)
- Children: 2

Pelin Akil (born 17 April 1986) is a Turkish actress.

== Life and career ==
Akil's maternal family is of Turkish descent who immigrated from Macedonia and Thessaloniki. Her paternal family is of Bosnian descent. She is a graduate of musical theatre from Istanbul University. She was married to Anıl Altan with whom he had twins, Doğa Alin Altan and Duru Lina Altan.

She played in many popular films and musicals. She played with her former husband Anıl Altan in many films such as Çember, Bittin Sen and Arka Sıradakiler.

Her television career started in hit youth series Arka Sıradakiler. She played in Kurt Kanunu based on a novel. She joined the hit series Suskunlar which was the first Turkish drama to be sold to the American market for remake. She had a dual role in the period comedy Seksenler. She appeared as an agent in the series Kızıl Elma opposite Furkan Palalı. She also had a role in the historical series Barbaroslar: Akdeniz'in Kılıcı. Alongside Oktay Kaynarca, she played in the series Ben Bu Cihana Sığmazam, Eşkıya Dünyaya Hükümdar Olmaz, and İnadına Yaşamak.

== Musical theater ==
- Marika'nın Serveti
- Rent Müzikali
- Abim Geldi
- Istanbulname
- Sersefil-Korkuyorum sevgilim
- Depo

== Filmography ==
=== Cinema ===
- 2023 Son Akşam Yemeği
- 2018 Keşif
- 2017 Bittin Sen (TV movie)
- 2017 Damat Takımı
- 2017 Deli Aşk
- 2015 Saklı
- 2014 Su ve Ateş
- 2013 Ana (Short movie)

=== Film series ===
Year	Title	Role
2017	Çember	Ayșe

=== TV series ===
Year	Title	Role
2024	Yalı Çapkını	Diyar
2022–2023	Ben Bu Cihana Sığmazam	Doctor Firuze Turan
2021–2022	Barbaroslar: Akdeniz'in Kılıcı	Isabel
2020–2021	Eşkıya Dünyaya Hükümdar Olmaz	Bahar
2016	Aile İşi	Müjde
2015	Ne Münasebet	Nil
2014	Aşktan Kaçılmaz	Yasemin
2014	Kızılelma	Zeynep Gevher
2013	İnadına Yaşamak	Sedef (Guest)
2012	Osmanlı Tokadı	Irmak Güzel
2012	Suskunlar	Nisan
2012	Seksenler	Seçil
2011	Kurt Kanunu	Ballı Naciye
2007–2011	Arka Sıradakiler	Zehra

=== Presenter ===
- Uzak Ara Eğlence

== Commercial ==
- Uno Ekmek
- Kaşmir Halı
- Ülker Caramio

== Music video ==
Year	Clip
2014	Kolpa – "Gurur Benim Neyime"
