= Pressure Drop (band) =

English electronic music duo

- Pressure Drop. Photo by Chris Clunn

Background information
- Also known as: Blood Brothers
- Origin: London, England
- Genres: Electronic; trip hop; acid jazz; house
- Labels: Big World Records; Marlboro Music; Higher Ground; Columbia; Sony Music
- Members: Justin Langlands; Dave Henley
- Past members: Gareth Tasker; Mick Puxley
- Website: pressuredrop.online

Pressure Drop are an English electronic music duo, composed of Justin Langlands and Dave Henley.

== Career ==
Pressure Drop released their first single Feeling Good in March 1990. It was written and produced by Justin Langlands, Mike Puxley and Gareth Tasker, but when Puxley and Tasker left, Dave Henley joined. Since then Pressure Drop has been a duo.

Langlands and Henley had known each other since 1986, and started DJing together at London's Wag Club after being introduced by Paul Guntrip. Langlands and Henley's first single together as Pressure Drop was Back 2 Back released on Big World Records in September 1990.

After recording the debut album Upset, their English label closed and was only initially released by Marlboro Music in Germany in 1992, and later in England in 1993 on Logic. James Lavelle sold imported copies of the album at Honest Jon's, the record store he worked at prior to setting up his record label Mo' Wax. He would later credit Pressure Drop for helping define the sound of his label.

Pressure Drop's second album Front Row was released in 1993 on Marlboro Music and in Japan on Meldac in 1994.

Their music was largely unavailable in England until they released Tearing The Silence EP on Leftfield's Hard Hands label in 1995, and their third album Elusive in 1997. During this period, they were likened to the current trip hop music trend, such as Massive Attack, Portishead, and Tricky, as their album received wider release than had been possible before.

In 2001, Pressure Drop released their fourth album Tread. They had relocated to Brighton in 1998 to begin work on the album. The album featured vocals from Martin Fishley, MC Skibadee, and Vanessa Freeman.

Food of Love, a compilation of their previous work and remixes, was released in 2003. Touch magazine called it "a timely retrospective of an important, but low key British collective."

== Blood Brothers Broadcasting Corporation ==
Pressure Drop hosted a weekly radio program on German's Sputnik under their alias Blood Brothers. Titled Blood Brothers Broadcasting Corporation, it featured their own live DJ mixes, as well as guest mixes and interviews with musicians and producers, and was available throughout Europe via the Astra satellite network. Broadcast between 1992-1997, the programs were eventually digitised from cassette and made available online.

== Discography ==
Albums

- Upset (1992)
- Front Row (1993)
- Elusive (1997)
- Tread (2001)
- Food of Love (2003)

== Singles ==
Year	Song	Peak chart position	Album
Year	Song	UK	Album
1990	"Feeling Good"	88	Single only
1990	"Back2Back"	—	Upset
1991	"You're Mine"	—	Upset
1992	"Big Noise"	—	Upset
1993	"Unify"	—	Front Row
1995	"Tearing The Silence"	—	EP only
1997	"My Friend"	91	Elusive
1997	"Got To Be For Real"	—	Elusive
1998	"Silently Bad Minded"	53	Elusive
2001	"Warrior Sound"	72	Tread
2003	"Legacy / Spirits Fall"	—	Food Of Love
