= Arka Sıradakiler =

2007 Turkish television series

- Written by: Birol Elginöz; Özlem Elginöz; Yelda Açıkgöz
- Directed by: Hamdi Alkan
- Starring: Bülent Emin Yarar; Bülent Çetinaslan; Sinem Öztürk; Temmuz Karikutal; Barış Atay; Fırat Çöloğlu; Deniz Sarıbaş; Pelin Akil
- Country of origin: Turkey
- Original language: Turkish
- No. of seasons: 6
- No. of episodes: 194

Production
- Producer: Birol Güven
- Running time: 110 minutes
- Production companies: MinT (Seasons 1-5); Best (Season 6)

Original release
- Network: Fox (Turkey)
- Release: September 30, 2007 – June 17, 2012

Arka Sıradakiler (Turkish pronunciation: [aɾˈka sɯɾadacileɾ]) is the title of a Turkish teen drama series, produced by Birol Guven and directed by Hamdi Alkan. Meaning "those at the back row," name of the series alludes to a group of forsaken students whose experiences comprise the main theme of the storyline. The series began broadcast on September 30, 2007, on Fox (Turkey). It was aired weekly on Sundays at 19:45 (UTC+2) until Season 6, which was aired on TNT Turkey on Sundays at 20:00. It had spin off series Öğretmen Kemal.

== Overview ==
The storyline features experiences of students and teaching staff of a suburban high school named Büyük Zafer High School in which gang fights, racketeering and drug abuse is common. While the students are trying to hold their place in chaos and most of the teachers are desperately getting themselves used to the situation, a new, determined teacher is appointed to the school. Pulling out all the stops, from family problems to psychological issues, he involves himself in every case about students. A typical episode practically analyzes emotional responses of characters to the troubles they face in their relationships with one another. Who is secretly psych "Mavi Sakal"?

== Episodes ==
Season	Total episodes	Season premiere	Season finale
Season 1	40	September 30, 2007	June 29, 2008
Season 2	38	August 31, 2008	June 28, 2009
Season 3	43	August 23, 2009	June 20, 2010
Season 4	40	August 22, 2010	June 5, 2011
Season 5	10	September 18, 2011	November 27, 2011
Season 6	23	January 15, 2012	June 17, 2012

- In Season 5, title of the series is Arka Sıradakiler Umut.
- Season 6 takes place in an alternate timeline, in which Saffet never chose to save Oktay when he was thrown in the sea by Loran and his men. It reached low ratings due to plot holes and logical errors caused by trying to erase the last two seasons of the series.

== Music ==
Composer Aydın Sarman, who also took on arranging the music of the then upcoming soundtrack album, collaborated with Burcu Güven to score various themes for the series. Style of these themes was largely rock influenced, including frequent electric guitar solos and strong, deep vocals performed by Bülent Çidem. Besides his vocals, Burcu Güven's voice is also audible in some of the songs as a backing vocal and a single track is completely performed by Aydın Sarman himself.

=== Soundtrack album ===
A soundtrack album of the series was released as the product of nearly a year of work on November 16, 2008. The number of tracks in the album can be accounted as a record for a TV series. Including instrumental tracks as well, the album consists of 22 tracks 11 of which are original. The album has a rich sound which might please not only the Arka Sıradakiler fans but also all the music lovers. Most of the lyrics and composition is created by Aydın Sarman and Burcu Güven again while Bülent Çidem is still the vocalist. The album - with an exception or two - features all of the background music audible in the show. It is also allowed its purchasers to join in a free sweepstakes by applying over the official website of the series. Those who won the sweepstakes gained the right to be one of ten people, who had the chance to meet the performers by getting into the film set. The sweepstakes, first of which was executed on 10 January 2009, were repeated in the 10th day of each month until June 2009.

==== Track listing ====
#	Title	In English	Time
1	Arka Sıradakiler Jenerik	Arka Sıradakiler Theme	03:21
2	Aşk Çıkmazı	Dilemma of Love	02:25
3	Hayatın Hayalleri	Dreams of Life	01:04
4	Yalan Dünya	Hollow World	02:26
5	Hep Birlikte	All Together	01:20
6	Karanlık Yollar	Dark Paths	02:48
7	Tek Yumruk	Single Fist	01:09
8	Deli Çağlarım	My Crazy Times	04:15
9	Mavi Sakal	Blue Beard	01:41
10	Gitmeler	Departures	03:43
11	Bariz Gıcık Oluyorum	I'm Obviously Sick of It	02:04
12	Nasihat	The Advice	02:10
13	Yalan	Lie	02:40
14	İlk Bakış	First Sight	01:50
15	Annem	My Mother	02:46
16	Acı ve Umut	Pain and Hope	01:40
17	Babam	My Father	03:44
18	Hüzne Dönüş	Returning to Sorrow	02:28
19	Urfa'nın Etrafı	Vicinity of Urfa	04:32
20	Uzak Aşk	Distant Love	01:33
21	Genç Türk Marşı (Ekstra Parça)	Anthem of the Young Turk (Bonus Track)	02:36
22	Arka Sıradakiler Jenerik (Enstrümantal)	Arka Sıradakiler Theme (Instrumental)	01:40
