= Akyıldız =

Akyıldız is a Turkish surname. It is derived from the combination of the Turkish words ak (meaning "white") and yıldız (meaning "star"). The term is also used in Turkish to refer to Sirius, the brightest star in the night sky.

Notable people with the surname include:

- Elvan Akyıldız (born 1977, Dutch actress
- Gökçe Akyıldız (born 1992), Turkish actress
- Ian F. Akyildiz (born 1954), German computer scientist
- Volkan Akyıldız (born 1995), Austrian football player
