= Gossip Girl =

2007 American teen drama television series

- Genre: Teen drama
- Based on: Gossip Girl by Cecily von Ziegesar
- Developed by: Josh Schwartz; Stephanie Savage
- Showrunners: Josh Schwartz (seasons 1–3); Stephanie Savage (seasons 1–3 & 6); Joshua Safran (seasons 4–5)
- Starring: Blake Lively; Leighton Meester; Penn Badgley; Chace Crawford; Taylor Momsen; Ed Westwick; Kelly Rutherford; Matthew Settle; Jessica Szohr; Kaylee DeFer
- Narrated by: Kristen Bell
- Opening theme: "Steps of the Met" by Transcenders
- Country of origin: United States
- Original language: English
- No. of seasons: 6
- No. of episodes: 121 (list of episodes)

Production
- Executive producers: Josh Schwartz; Stephanie Savage; Donovan Shavis; Bob Levy; Leslie Morgenstein; John Stephens; Joshua Safran (seasons 4–5); Sara Goodman (season 6)
- Production locations: New York City (Manhattan and Brooklyn); Long Island East End
- Running time: 39–44 minutes
- Production companies: Warner Bros. Television; Alloy Entertainment; College Hill Pictures, Inc. (seasons 1–3); CBS Television Studios (seasons 3–6); Fake Empire (seasons 4–6)

Original release
- Network: The CW
- Release: September 19, 2007 – December 17, 2012

Related
- Lipgloss (2008); Gossip Girl: Chasing Dorota (2009); Gossip Girl: Acapulco (2013); Gossip Girl: Thailand (2015); The Gossip Girl (China; 2015); Gossip Girl Indonesia (2020); Little Secrets (Turkey; 2010); Gossip Girl (2021)

Gossip Girl is an American teen drama television series created and developed by Josh Schwartz and Stephanie Savage and based on the series of novels of the same name by Cecily von Ziegesar. It follows a group of students on Manhattan's Upper East Side whose private and social lives are chronicled by the unidentified blogger "Gossip Girl". The series was broadcast on the CW from September 19, 2007, to December 17, 2012, spanning six seasons and 121 episodes.

The series' main characters include socialite Serena van der Woodsen (Blake Lively), her popular frenemy Blair Waldorf (Leighton Meester), her mother Lily van der Woodsen (Kelly Rutherford), and her crush Dan Humphrey (Penn Badgley), an aspiring writer and scholarship student. Other main characters include Blair's ex-boyfriend Nate Archibald (Chace Crawford), his best friend Chuck Bass (Ed Westwick), Dan's sister Jenny Humphrey (Taylor Momsen), Dan's childhood friend Vanessa Abrams (Jessica Szohr), his father Rufus Humphrey (Matthew Settle), and the troublesome Ivy Dickens (Kaylee DeFer).

A ratings hit in its early seasons, Gossip Girl received generally positive reviews from critics and audiences but became known for using negative critical reviews in its marketing. The series won numerous accolades, including 18 Teen Choice Awards. It gained a large cult following, influenced other teen dramas and spawned several international television adaptations.

The series was followed by a standalone sequel, also titled Gossip Girl, which aired for two seasons between 2021 and 2023 on HBO Max.

== Premise ==
The series focuses on a group of privileged teenagers who attend a prestigious high school on the Upper East Side of Manhattan in New York City. Their private lives are constantly commented upon by an unknown blogger under the pseudonym "Gossip Girl".

Gossip Girl chronicles the scandals and intimate details of the characters' lives during high school, college and in the years that follow. All of their ups and downs are available for the public to read about. Throughout this time, the characters strive to unveil Gossip Girl's true identity while covertly engaging in disastrous schemes.

== Episodes ==
Season	Episodes	Originally released		Average viewership (in millions)
Season	Episodes	First released	Last released	Average viewership (in millions)
1	18	September 19, 2007	May 19, 2008	2.6
2	25	September 1, 2008	May 18, 2009	2.8
3	22	September 14, 2009	May 17, 2010	2.0
4	22	September 13, 2010	May 16, 2011	1.6
5	24	September 26, 2011	May 14, 2012	1.2
6	10	October 8, 2012	December 17, 2012	0.9

== Cast and characters ==
=== Main ===
- Blake Lively as Serena van der Woodsen, a socialite studying at the Constance Billard School for Girls (and later, at Columbia University). Serena receives media attention and is romantically involved with Dan throughout the series.
- Leighton Meester as Blair Waldorf, the queen bee of Constance Billard (and later, at New York University). Her "frenemy" relationship with Serena is a constant theme in the series. Blair is highly focused on status, wealth and academic achievement and is romantically involved with Chuck.
- Penn Badgley as Daniel "Dan" Humphrey, an outcast, scholarship student at St. Jude's School for Boys (and later, New York University) and aspiring fiction writer. Dan's romantic relationship with Serena is a constant theme throughout the series.
- Chace Crawford as Nathaniel "Nate" Archibald, a legacy student at St. Jude's. Nate is romantically involved with numerous characters throughout the series, including Blair and Serena.
- Taylor Momsen as Jennifer "Jenny" Humphrey (seasons 1–4; guest, season 6), a student at Constance Billard's and Dan's younger sister and aspiring fashion designer. She uses underhanded tactics to gain social status and power, including becoming rivals with her friends and family.
- Ed Westwick as Charles "Chuck" Bass, a promiscuous and wealthy legacy student at St. Jude's. Chuck is romantically involved with Blair throughout the series.
- Kelly Rutherford as Lillian "Lily" van der Woodsen (née Rhodes), Serena and Eric's socialite mother and former photographer. Lily's love life and relationship with her children are strained and rocky. Her primary romantic relationships throughout the series are with Bart Bass (Chuck's father) and Rufus Humphrey.
- Matthew Settle as Rufus Humphrey, Dan and Jenny's father, who was a former musicican for the one-hit wonder rock band Lincoln Hawk and owns an art gallery in Brooklyn. Rufus shares a complicated romantic history with Lily.
- Jessica Szohr as Vanessa Abrams (seasons 1–4; guest, season 6), Dan's childhood best friend who later attends New York University. Vanessa aspires to be a filmmaker and has a romantic interest in Nate, Dan and Chuck during the series.
- Kaylee DeFer as Ivy Dickens (seasons 5–6; recurring, season 4), a con-artist introduced to the Van der Woodsens as their cousin, Charlie Rhodes

The series featured uncredited narration by Kristen Bell, who appears in every episode. Bell portrays herself in the series finale.

=== Selected recurring ===
- Connor Paolo as Eric van der Woodsen, Serena's younger brother who is recovering from an attempted suicide
- Zuzanna Szadkowski as Dorota Kishlovsky, the Waldorfs's Polish housekeeper and Blair's closest confidante. She is portrayed as a motherly figure to Blair.
- Margaret Colin as Eleanor Waldorf-Rose, Blair's mother who is a busy and successful fashion designer who often battles her daughter
- Wallace Shawn as Cyrus Rose, Blair's stepfather and entertainment lawyer who builds a strong relationship with Blair
- Michelle Trachtenberg as Georgina Sparks, a troublesome schemer and Serena's former friend
- Sebastian Stan as Carter Baizen, a complicated acquaintance of Nate and Serena
- Robert John Burke as Bartholomew Bass, Chuck's father and a successful real estate mogul
- Aaron Tveit as William "Tripp" van der Bilt III, Nate's older cousin who runs for political office
- Amanda Setton, Nicole Fiscella, Nan Zhang, Dreama Walker, Yin Chang, and Alice Callahan appear as Penelope Shafai, Isabel Coates, Kati Farkas, Hazel Williams, Nelly Yuki, and Jessica Leitenberg, respectively, the clique of mean girl "minions" who follow Blair throughout the series
- Desmond Harrington as Jack Bass, Chuck's scheming uncle who always gets in his way

== Production ==
=== Development ===
The Gossip Girl novel series by Cecily von Ziegesar was originally supposed to be adapted into a film starring Lindsay Lohan with head Gilmore Girls creator Amy Sherman-Palladino. When the film project did not get off the ground, Stephanie Savage and Josh Schwartz took over, to create a television series. By October 2006, Schwartz was working on the pilot. He said: "I was very skeptical [of the series]. I don't want to [repeat] The O.C.. [von Ziegesar's] books are smart [and] the characters are worldly". The characteristics for each character in the pilot were based on the first Gossip Girl book. In January 2007, the show was given the green light by the CW.

=== Production team ===
The O.C. creator Josh Schwartz and fellow writer Stephanie Savage served as the show's executive producers throughout the series' run, followed by Bob Levy and Leslie Morgenstein of Alloy Entertainment, who were assigned in aiding the adaptation of the novels into the series. Following the success of Gossip Girl, Gilmore Girls co-producer, John Stephens was approached by Schwartz and Savage, having previously worked with him on The O.C., and hired him as an executive producer. Joshua Safran, who started as a writer/consulting producer before becoming co-executive producer, was later added as an executive producer. On April 24, 2012, it was announced that he would leave the show at the end of the fifth season to be the new show runner of NBC's now-cancelled musical series Smash. To fill in Safran's void, co-executive producer Sara Goodman was promoted to executive producer for the sixth season. Alexandra Patsavas who worked with Schwartz on The O.C. was in charge of the music. Eric Daman was at the head of the costume department; he previously had assisted Patricia Field on Sex and the City.

=== Casting ===
Featuring nine regular speaking roles, the majority of the ensemble cast was assembled from February to April 2007. Leighton Meester and Blake Lively–who started auditioning in December 2006–were the first two actresses to be chosen in February for the lead roles of Blair Waldorf and Serena van der Woodsen, respectively. Penn Badgley, who had previously worked with Stephanie Savage on The Mountain, Taylor Momsen, Chace Crawford, Kelly Rutherford, and Connor Paolo also auditioned successfully and landed roles in the series in March, as did Florencia Lozano who appeared only in the pilot, and was later replaced by Margaret Colin. Badgley at first turned down the part of Dan since he originally auditioned for Chuck Bass. In an interview with Vulture, he stated that he turned down the role of Dan at first because of frustration; Lively—who planned to attend college—also initially turned down the role of Serena. Actors for the roles of Chuck Bass and Rufus Humphrey were found in April when British actor Ed Westwick, and Matthew Settle were cast. Westwick first read for the role of Nate but was then asked to try Chuck. As rumors swirled about the impending cancellation of Veronica Mars, it was revealed at the CW's 2007 upfronts on May 17, 2007, that Kristen Bell had narrated the pilot, thus making her the title character of another show on the network. Of the casting, Bell said:

I read [the Gossip Girl pilot], and I knew I was sort of old to play any of the kids. I called Dawn Ostroff [...] and said, "Hey, I did so much narration on Veronica Mars, can I narrate this show?" [...] It was so clear to me how sassy and catty she needed to be.

Jessica Szohr was signed on to portray the recurring role of Vanessa Abrams and received regular status during the fourteenth episode of the first season. Kaylee DeFer joined the series in the eighteenth episode of the fourth season and was promoted to series regular for the show's fifth season.

At the conclusion of the fourth season, Momsen, who went on an indefinite hiatus during the season while retaining regular billing, and Jessica Szohr both left the show. Throughout the series' run, Connor Paolo consistently declined to elevate his recurring role of Eric van der Woodsen to regular status, citing personal reasons for his decision. After becoming a regular on the ABC series Revenge, Paolo confirmed his departure from Gossip Girl in August 2011.

As the show progressed, numerous recurring guest stars appeared in the show. Michelle Trachtenberg signed on to portray Georgina Sparks. The role had previously been offered to Mischa Barton who declined the role. Francie Swift and Sam Robards took the parental roles of Anne and Howard Archibald, respectively. Caroline Lagerfelt portrayed Celia "CeCe" Rhodes, Serena and Eric's grandmother and Lily's mother. Sebastian Stan made several appearances as Carter Baizen throughout the show's first three seasons.

=== Filming locations ===
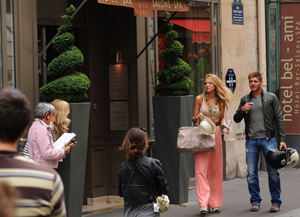
Gossip Girl filming in Saint-Germain-des-Prés, Paris, France

Primarily filming in New York, Gossip Girl has been declared by New York Magazine as the "Most Restauranty Show Since Sex and the City", citing the pilot episode filming locales such as the Japanese restaurant Geisha, the Campbell Apartment where Nate and Serena were filmed having sex, and the New York Palace Hotel bar Gilt. Other New York City landmarks and well-known establishments were filmed throughout the first season. Victor/Victrola filmed the fictional infamous Chuck Bass burlesque club, Victrola, at The Box Manhattan, a sister club to The Box Soho in London. The fictional Constance Billard-St.Judes School, based on novel writer Cecily Von Ziegesar's alma mater, Nightingale-Bamford used external shots of the Museum of the City of New York.

The second season premiered at the Hamptons and began filming in mid-June. The season premiere opening montage showed a scene at Cooper's Beach that was instead filmed in Rockaway Beach followed by an elaborate white party. For the sixth episode of the season, Columbia University was used to film the Yale campus, an episode that followed disappointment from Yale fans due to its erroneous portrayal of the admissions process and reliance on Ivy League university stereotypes. During the season's seventh episode, the Brooklyn Inn was integrated into the show. Remaining true to its New York locations, the show filmed at the Russian Tea Room.

The fourth season premiered on September 13, 2010, with the first two episodes filmed in Paris. New York Magazine revealed filming had taken place at La Sorbonne in the Latin Quarter of Paris on July 5. Other locations included the Musée d'Orsay, the Eiffel Tower, the Gare du Nord, Avenue Montaigne and Saint-Germain-des-Prés. Columbia University became the primary filming location for the first few episodes of the season following the Paris story arc.

The fifth season premiered on September 26, 2011, with the first two episodes filmed in Los Angeles, California.

Because of its location in New York, executive producer Stephanie Savage said: "We were quickly told it would be too expensive, too complicated" at the beginning of the series. She said that it had been proposed to shoot in a Los Angeles studio that would recreate Central Park, but they eventually filmed the series in New York. Savage explained their choice to film there: "There's no New York City on TV, or there wasn't when we started making the pilot, except what you could see in the background behind the dead bodies on cop shows. We've never seen the city from the point of view of teenagers. It felt like a world with high stakes for young people." Schwartz added: "What's funny about these teenagers is they grew up watching Sex and the City, even though it wasn't about them. And I think they've probably incorporated that into how they mythologize New York. I fought really hard to shoot the show in New York because we want New York to be a character in the show." Many scenes were filmed in the Empire Hotel on the Upper West Side.

=== Episode format ===
Each episode begins with the home page of the Gossip Girl website and Serena's picture from the pilot episode. Afterward, a recap of events relevant to the upcoming narrative is shown, which ends again with the home page of the website, only this time with a picture from other character(s) with a text about a recent event connected with the picture.

The narrator is Gossip Girl, voiced by actress Kristen Bell. She begins the recap with the sentence: "Gossip Girl here, your one and only source into the scandalous lives of Manhattan's elite," and ends the recap with whispered voices saying "Where has she been?" and "Serena." Then, the voice of Gossip Girl says, "And who am I? That's one secret I'll never tell! You know you love me... XOXO, Gossip Girl."

During each episode, there is always a social event taking place, whether small or large. Joshua Safran explained, "We structure it [the show] so that every week, the episode leads to an event. I feel like it is much like a procedural."

=== Episode titles ===
All of the episodes' titles are based on the name of a film or a novel. For example, episode "The Wild Brunch" evokes western film The Wild Bunch and "Seventeen Candles" Sixteen Candles. Episode "All About My Brother" refers to Pedro Almodóvar's All About My Mother while "Pret-a-Poor-J" came from Prêt-à-Porter. "There Might Be Blood" took its title from 2007 film There Will Be Blood. "The Serena Also Rises" was titled after novel The Sun Also Rises. The fifth-season episode "The Big Sleep No More" was named for the film The Big Sleep and the New York-based production Sleep No More. Episode "Easy J" was titled after Emma Stone's hit movie Easy A. Episode "The Age of Dissonance", which was titled after Edith Wharton's novel The Age of Innocence, saw a high school production of the novel taking place, and "The Blair Bitch Project" was named after The Blair Witch Project. "Victor, Victrola" is named after the British-American musical comedy Victor/Victoria. "Bad News Blair" was named after the 1976 movie The Bad News Bears. "The Wrong Goodbye" was named after the book The Long Goodbye.

Joshua Safran said, "we draw from classic works like Les Liaisons Dangereuses and The Great Gatsby as much as we do from pop culture."

=== Product placement ===
Gossip Girl is known for its product placement. The show had a contract with Verizon Wireless for its first five seasons; all the characters were seen with phones chosen by the brand until the deal ended by the sixth season. During their contract, Verizon Wireless offered exclusive Gossip Girl content and created a website where ringtones of the songs featured on the show could be downloaded. Barbra Robin, the CW's senior vice president of Integrated Marketing, stated: "It was really about showing features on a device. [...] Initially, it was just a wireless phone, but eventually that became a smartphone, a tablet, all these other types of technology that took them through their day and showed how they used it to get from one place to the next."

In mid-2008, executives of VitaminWater approached the CW for a placement deal. During the second season, the drinks were mentioned several times in dialogues. The partnership helped pay the costs of shooting on location in the Hamptons. An HP TouchPad was prominently displayed in an episode of the sixth season. According to OneNewsNow.com, other sponsors have included Procter & Gamble, L'Oreal, Target and Johnson & Johnson, which allowed the series to earn $28.2 million in advertising revenue in 2007.

== Distribution and release ==
Gossip Girl aired on the CW on Mondays. In addition to the television broadcast of the show, episodes of Gossip Girl have also been released on the Internet. In October 2011, the CW signed a deal allowing all Gossip Girl episodes to be streamed on Netflix. The same month, the network signed a deal with Hulu. Both CWTV.com and Hulu streamed episodes for free, but only the five most recent installments were available for viewing. All seasons of Gossip Girl are also available through the iTunes Store and Amazon Video where each episode can be purchased separately or in complete season sets.

As of 2012, the series was broadcast in 197 countries.

On January 1, 2021, Gossip Girl moved from Netflix to WarnerMedia's streaming service HBO Max. WarnerMedia is the parent company of the series' production company, Warner Bros. Television. On October 29, 2024, Gossip Girl returned to Netflix.

=== Syndication ===
On July 25, 2012, Style Network announced that it had acquired the off-network rights to Gossip Girl and started airing repeats of the show on August 15, 2012.

=== Home media ===
The DVD sets of each season were released in various regions after their television broadcast.

DVD Name	Release dates				Technical details	Bonus Features
DVD Name	Region 1	Region 2	Region 3	Region 4	Technical details	Bonus Features
The Complete First Season	August 19, 2008	August 18, 2008	October 22, 2008	April 15, 2009	5-Disc Set; Aspect ratio: 1.78:1; Language: English; Subtitles: Chinese, English, French, Korean, Portuguese, Spanish, Thai; Running time: 810 minutes	Unaired Scenes; The Beginning, XOXO: Concept to Execution Featurette; Gossip Girl Couture Featurette; A Gossip Girl Wedding Featurette; LOL: Gag Reel; The Pierces "Secret" and "Boring" Music Videos; Downloadable Audiobook of the Original Best-selling Novel, read by Christina Ricci.
The Complete Second Season	August 18, 2009	September 28, 2009	October 2, 2009	October 28, 2009	7-Disc Set; Aspect ratio (image): 1.78:1; Language: English; Subtitles: English, French, Spanish, Chinese, Thai; Running time: 810 minutes	5th Ave. Meets Gossip Girl: Tour the Gossip Girl Crowd's Favorite Haunts; Faces Behind the Design: Creative Forces Behind the Show's Art and Fashion; Chasing Dorota Webisodes; Gag Reel; Downloadable Audiobook of the Best-selling Novel Gossip Girl, You Know You Love Me by Cecily von Ziegesar, read by Christina Ricci; *Unaired Scenes
The Complete Third Season	August 24, 2010	August 23, 2010	October 2, 2010	September 1, 2010	5-Disc Set; Aspect ratio: 1.78:1; Language: English; Subtitles: English, French, Spanish; Running time: 935 minutes	Gossip Girl Mode: Interactive Viewing Experience on Episode 16, "The Empire Strikes Jack"; A Gossip Girl Fabulous Affair: Throwing a Party Gossip Girl-Style; Lady Gaga "Bad Romance" and Plastiscines "Bitch" Music Videos; Gag Reel; Unaired Scenes
The Complete Fourth Season	August 23, 2011	August 15, 2011	September 2011	September 7, 2011	5-Disc Set; Aspect ratio: 1.77:1; Language: English; Subtitles: Chinese, French, Portuguese, Spanish; Running time: 935 minutes	Bisoux a Paris!: Go Abroad on a Spree in Paris with the Cast and Creative Teams; Exposing Gossip Girl: The Making of Episode 18: The Complete Lowdown on the Creative Processes Behind "The Kids Stay in the Picture"; Gag Reel; Unaired Scenes
The Complete Fifth Season	September 25, 2012	September 3, 2012	October 12, 2012	September 12, 2012	5-Disc Set; Aspect ratio: 1.77:1; Language: English; Subtitles: Chinese, French, Portuguese, Spanish; Running time: 1032 minutes	5 Years of Iconic Style; Gossip Girl Turns 100; Gag Reel; Unaired Scenes
The Complete Sixth and Final Season	February 12, 2013	February 18, 2013	July 19, 2013	February 27, 2013	3-Disc Set; Aspect ratio: 1.77:1; Language: English; Subtitles: Spanish, French, Korean; Running time: 430 minutes	"A Big Farewell and XOXO to the Upper East Siders" Featurette; Gossip Girl Prequel: It Had To Be You (Audiobook); Gag Reel; Unaired Scenes
The Complete Series	February 12, 2013	February 18, 2013	July 19, 2013	February 12, 2013	121 Episodes; 30-Disc Set; Aspect ratio: 1.77:1; Language: English; Subtitles: Spanish, French, Korean, Chinese, Portuguese	Same Bonus Features as the Individual Season Sets

Notes:

- In Australia there is alternative cover art for the first season. There are also three different versions of the second season (the standard edition, a special 8-disc edition, and an alternative cover art—which is the same cover art used for part two of the second season in the UK).
- The second season was first released in two parts in Region 2. Part one was released on April 13, 2009, and part two was released on August 10, 2009, while the complete season was released later, on September 28, 2009.

== Reception ==
=== Critical response ===
Gossip Girl poster featuring a negative review.

Gossip Girl initially received positive reviews. Due to the show's pedigree as an adaptation of The New York Times best-selling novel series, the show was considered to be one of the most anticipated new shows of the 2007–2008 television season. An August 2007 survey by OTX, a global media research and consulting firm, placed the show on the list of top ten new shows that viewers were aware of. Though the pilot was the recipient of many positive reviews from publications such as Variety, The Washington Post, San Francisco Chronicle and the Boston Globe, other reviewers described it as a guilty pleasure rather than an hour's worth of must-watch television. Metacritic gave it a score of 59, based on the reviews of 40 different publications.

Toward the conclusion of the first season, Janet Malcolm of The New Yorker criticized the show for its deviations from the novels. She stated that the series was "related to the original only in the names and outlines of the characters", and that "Without von Ziegesar's fast, mocking commentary to propel them, the TV episodes are sluggish and crass—a move from Barneys to Kmart". Author Cecily von Ziegesar said that all of her major plot points were present in the pilot. Von Ziegesar was so pleased by Malcolm's article that she asked to meet the writer.

As the show continued its first season, the response became considerably more positive, and by the second season critical response was favorable. Metacritic gave the new season an improved score of 71. "Summer's been good to this girl," claimed Entertainment Weekly, who awarded the series its highest grade of "A". The New York Daily News claimed the show had found its footing by stating "It knows exactly what it wants and needs its new hybrid product to be. The hockey fights video of teen romance drama." Gossip Girl was designated the "Greatest Teen Drama of All Time" by New York magazine. The magazine wrote: "The show has resurrected the potential for scripted dramas to be effective social satire—to present a world more accurately than a 'reality' program can. Gossip Girl presents a wealth-eye view of the city, but because it is a cartoon we can laugh along with the conspicuousness of the consumption."

The Christian Parents Television Council has shown particular criticism of the series, especially with its "OMFG" ad campaign from April 2008. It also named the episode "Victor/Victrola" the worst television program of the week in which the episode originally was broadcast. Quotes from the Parents Television Council review, as well as negative quotes from the San Diego Union-Tribune, New York Post and the Boston Herald, were used on various advertisements for the second season. The Hartford Courant chronicled a variety of negative responses to the ads. The ads included quotes like "Every Parent's Nightmare", "Mind-Blowingly Inappropriate" and "A Nasty Piece of Work" in what appears to be an effort to continue the "rebellious teen" style of the show.

With the approach of the fifth season, New York magazine reviewed the life expectancy of the show, noting its waning cultural relevancy despite the growing prominence of its actors, and the loss of its status as the CW's number-one show, having been beaten out in terms of ratings by other shows of the network like Supernatural and 90210. "The series itself hasn't quite kept up, even if its plotting is as juicy and lunatic as ever." and that "The cast would all rather be making movies, while the showrunners are focusing on launching new projects via their nascent Fake Empire production company (including CW newcomer Hart of Dixie). Barring an unexpected brand reboot or another stab at a spinoff, we're afraid the end is near. XOXO." AOL TV ranked Gossip Girl the 20th Best School Show of All Time and the 4th TV's Biggest Guilty Pleasure. The show was declared the tenth highest-rated show for the first ten years of IMDb.com Pro (2002–2012).

The reveal of Dan as being Gossip Girl in the series finale received mixed reception: Badgley stated he did not know about the identity of Gossip Girl before shooting the episode and said his character being Gossip Girl created several narrative inconsistencies for the series. Von Ziegesar defended Dan being Gossip Girl in the series as "the only logical thing", but reiterated that Gossip Girl in her novel series is an unidentified omniscient narrator.

Scholars have criticized the series for being low-quality fiction aimed at teenage girls, focused on activities such as "frenzied shopping, gossiping, partying, and sexual encounters", and portraying beauty and wealth as most important and desirable qualities.

=== Cultural influence ===
CW executive Dawn Ostroff later compared Gossip Girl's role as the show that defined its network to House of Cards for Netflix. Its television audience was never very large, but the show was influential on culture; Savage recalled that the crew likened working on it to working for a lifestyle magazine. Bell stated: "[Schwartz and Savage] were spearheading: 'What if the Internet is just a place to judge people? What if that's what it turns into?' And they turned out to be Nostradamus."

A hairstylist for the show compared media interest in Lively's hair to that for Jennifer Aniston's "The Rachel". In 2008, The New York Times reported the show has had a profound impact on retail, saying Gossip Girl is probably "the first [show] to have been conceived, in part, as a fashion marketing vehicle". While it has had middling success in terms of ratings, it "may well be the biggest influence in the youth culture market", said a trend spotter. However, for Maheen Humayun of The Tempest, the show emphasized toxic cultural traits, like rape culture, that "messed up a whole generation." According to Zoe Fox of Mashable, the show popularized social media networks and mobile communication, becoming "a pioneer in its use of mobile". In 2008, New York Magazine named the series as "Best Show Ever". In 2009, Rolling Stone named the series as "TV's Hottest Show".

On January 26, 2012, in honor of the series' 100th episode, New York City Mayor Michael Bloomberg visited the set and proclaimed the date Gossip Girl Day, citing the show's cultural influence and impact on the economy of the city. "Gossip Girl has made New York a central character. While Gossip Girl is drawing fans in with its plot twists, the show also attracts many of them to visit New York, contributing to our incredible 50.5 million visitors last year. In fact, the economic impact of Gossip Girl and other television shows and films that are made in New York really can be felt directly in all five boroughs. The 100th episode of Gossip Girl is a real landmark, and I want to congratulate the show's cast and crew," he stated.

The popularity of the series was also indirectly responsible for the creation of the reality series NYC Prep, which ran for one season on Bravo.

Gossip Girl paved the way for numerous teen dramas that came after it. The show influenced the notorious text harassment throughout Pretty Little Liars, as well as the class conflict plot in Elite. Popular among teenagers and young adults, the Gossip Girl cast has posed on the cover of numerous mainstream magazines, including Rolling Stone, People, Nylon, New York Magazine, TV Guide, New York Post, Vogue, Out Magazine, Details, and Entertainment Weekly.

=== Ratings ===
The series premiere was watched by 3.50 million viewers and achieved a 1.6 Adults 18–49, coming in last place in its 9:00 pm timeslot on Wednesday nights. However, the show was noted to have held the best audience retention of America's Next Top Model. Benefiting from the network rerunning the show during the 2008 WGA strike, the season ended with 3.00 million viewers. The second season premiered with 3.43 million viewers. The second season ended with 2.23 million viewers. The third season premiered with 2.55 million viewers. The third season ended with 1.96 million viewers. The fourth season premiered to 1.83 million viewers and a 1.0 for adults 18–49. Episode 4.04 hit season highs in all categories with a 2.8 rating in the CW's target of Women 18–34, a 1.7 in Adults 18–34 and 1.1 in Adults 18–49. The fourth season ended with 1.36 million viewers. The fifth season premiered with 1.37 million viewers. The fifth season ended with 1.44 million viewers.

Despite this, throughout the fifth season, Gossip Girl continued to see a decrease in viewers. The sixth season premiered to 0.78 million viewers, making it not only the least viewed season premiere for the series, but also the least viewed episode in show's six-year run. The following episode saw a decrease to 0.76 million viewers, which once again marked a new series low in terms of viewers. The series finale was watched by 1.55 million viewers, the highest viewed episode since season four.

Season	Timeslot	Season premiere	Season finale	TV season	Rank	U.S. viewers (in millions)	Rating (adults 18–49)
1	Wednesday 9:00 pm (1–13); Monday 8:00 pm (14–18)	September 19, 2007	May 19, 2008	2007–2008	#196	2.35	1.2
2	Monday 8:00 pm	September 1, 2008	May 18, 2009	2008–2009	#168	2.48	1.4
3	Monday 9:00 pm	September 14, 2009	May 17, 2010	2009–2010	#135	2.02	1.1
4	Monday 9:00 pm	September 13, 2010	May 16, 2011	2010–2011	#139	1.64	0.8
5	Monday 8:00 pm	September 26, 2011	May 14, 2012	2011–2012	#188	1.18	0.6
6	Monday 9:00 pm	October 8, 2012	December 17, 2012	2012–2013	#140	0.90	0.5

=== Awards and accolades ===
Awards and accolades for Gossip Girl
Year	Award	Category	Nominee(s)	Result
2008	Artios Awards	Outstanding Achievement in Casting – Television Pilot – Drama	Gossip Girl	Nominated
2008	ASTRA Awards	Favourite International Program	Gossip Girl	Nominated
2008	Teen Choice Awards	Choice TV Show Drama	Gossip Girl	Won
2008	Teen Choice Awards	Choice TV Breakout Show	Gossip Girl	Won
2008	Teen Choice Awards	Choice TV Actress Drama	Blake Lively	Won
2008	Teen Choice Awards	Choice TV Breakout Female	Blake Lively	Won
2008	Teen Choice Awards	Choice TV Breakout Male	Chace Crawford	Won
2008	Teen Choice Awards	Choice TV Villain	Ed Westwick	Won
2008	Teen Choice Awards	Choice TV Actress Drama	Leighton Meester	Nominated
2008	Teen Choice Awards	Choice TV Actor Drama	Chace Crawford	Nominated
2008	Teen Choice Awards	Choice TV Actor Drama	Penn Badgley	Nominated
2008	Teen Choice Awards	Choice TV Breakout Female	Leighton Meester	Nominated
2008	Teen Choice Awards	Choice TV Breakout Female	Taylor Momsen	Nominated
2008	Teen Choice Awards	Choice TV Breakout Male	Ed Westwick	Nominated
2008	People's Choice Awards	Favorite New TV Drama	Gossip Girl	Nominated
2009	ASTRA Awards	Favourite International Personality or Actor	Blake Lively	Nominated
2009	Costume Designers Guild	Outstanding Costume Design for Television Series – Contemporary	Eric Daman	Nominated
2009	Prism Awards	Drama Episode	"Woman on the Verge"	Nominated
2009	Prism Awards	Performance in a Drama Episode	Blake Lively	Nominated
2009	ASTRA Awards	Favourite International Program	Gossip Girl	Nominated
2009	Teen Choice Awards	Choice TV Show Drama	Gossip Girl	Won
2009	Teen Choice Awards	Choice TV Actor Drama	Chace Crawford	Won
2009	Teen Choice Awards	Choice TV Actress Drama	Leighton Meester	Won
2009	Teen Choice Awards	Choice TV Villain	Ed Westwick	Won
2009	Teen Choice Awards	Choice Music Soundtrack	Gossip Girl	Nominated
2009	Teen Choice Awards	Choice TV Actor Drama	Penn Badgley	Nominated
2009	Teen Choice Awards	Choice TV Parental Unit	Matthew Settle	Nominated
2009	Young Hollywood Awards	Breakthrough Performance Male	Ed Westwick	Won
2010	Teen Choice Awards	Choice TV Show Drama	Gossip Girl	Won
2010	Teen Choice Awards	Choice TV Actress Drama	Leighton Meester	Won
2010	Teen Choice Awards	Choice TV Actor Drama	Chace Crawford	Won
2010	Teen Choice Awards	Choice Female Scene Stealer	Hilary Duff	Won
2010	Teen Choice Awards	Choice TV Actress Drama	Blake Lively	Nominated
2010	Teen Choice Awards	Choice TV Actor Drama	Penn Badgley	Nominated
2010	Teen Choice Awards	Choice TV Villain	Ed Westwick	Nominated
2011	People's Choice Awards	Favorite TV Drama Actress	Blake Lively	Nominated
2011	People's Choice Awards	Favorite TV Drama Actor	Chace Crawford	Nominated
2011	Teen Choice Awards	Choice TV Show Drama	Gossip Girl	Won
2011	Teen Choice Awards	Choice TV Actress: Drama	Blake Lively	Won
2011	Teen Choice Awards	Choice TV Actor: Drama	Chace Crawford	Won
2011	Teen Choice Awards	Choice TV Actor: Drama	Penn Badgley	Nominated
2012	People's Choice Awards	Favorite TV Drama Actress	Blake Lively	Nominated
2012	Teen Choice Awards	Choice TV Drama Series	Gossip Girl	Nominated
2012	Teen Choice Awards	Choice TV Drama Actress	Leighton Meester	Nominated
2012	Teen Choice Awards	Choice TV Drama Actor	Ed Westwick	Nominated
2012	Teen Choice Awards	Choice TV Drama Actor	Penn Badgley	Nominated
2012	Teen Choice Awards	Choice TV Villain	Michelle Trachtenberg	Nominated
2013	People's Choice Awards	Favorite Network TV Drama	Gossip Girl	Nominated
2013	Teen Choice Awards	Choice TV Show: Drama	Gossip Girl	Nominated
2013	Teen Choice Awards	Choice TV Actor: Drama	Penn Badgley	Nominated
2013	Teen Choice Awards	Choice TV Actress: Drama	Blake Lively	Nominated
2018	Teen Choice Awards	Choice TV Series: Throwback	Gossip Girl	Nominated

=== DVR ratings ===
- 2007
- 2008
- 2009
- 2010
- 2011

=== Online ratings ===
The series was the 5th most-binged TV series on Subscription Video-on-Demand (SVOD) Services; derived from NPD's VideoWatch Digital, consumer tracker based on data from 313,866 SVOD TV transactions across 26,176 SVOD subscribers that were completed between January 2012 and January 2013.

== Merchandise ==
=== Soundtrack ===
The first soundtrack of the TV series, OMFGG – Original Music Featured On Gossip Girl, No. 1 was released digitally on September 2, 2008, and in stores on October 28, 2008.

=== Fashion ===
Merchants, designers and trend consultants say that Gossip Girl ... is one of the biggest influences on how young women spend. Fans stride into boutiques bearing magazine tear sheets that feature members of the cast and ask for their exact outfits. Or they order scoop-neck tops and hobo bags by following e-commerce links from the show's Web site.

— The New York Times, 2008

Gossip Girl was very influential on fashion for teenage and young adult women. The show was intended in part as a way for fashion companies to market their products. Some brands paid a fee, and the show's website provided referral links so viewers could purchase items they saw on television. In 2009, Anna Sui created a line inspired by Gossip Girl. Daman, who based his costumes on what Manhattan private-school students wore, said that by the sixth season the show was "getting one-of-a-kind couture from Paris", because "they wanted their wares on Blake Lively".

On September 16, 2011, it was announced that Warner Bros. and label Romeo & Juliet Couture had partnered to create Gossip Girl's official clothing line inspired by lead characters Serena van der Woodsen and Blair Waldorf. The launch of the fashion line took place on September 26, 2011, the same day as the premiere of the fifth season.

Cosmetics online retailer Birchbox and Gossip Girl have teamed up to create a special Birchbox edition filled with beauty products inspired by the show. The products were chosen by Gossip Girl's makeup department head, Amy Tagliamonti, and hair department head, Jennifer Johnson.

Throughout the series, the characters' connections to the New York fashion world are emphasized through cameos from significant figures including designers and celebrities, often playing themselves. Vera Wang designs Blair's wedding dress and makes an appearance during a fitting. In one episode, Tim Gunn plays himself in an episode where he reviews Jenny's designs and Isaac Mizrahi chats with Lily, a purported acquaintance. Rachel Zoe memorably falls and knocks a chocolate fondue fountain on herself at Blair's birthday party. When Serena defers attending Brown, she seeks internships at Marchesa, with Georgina Chapman, and at Tory Burch.

== Adaptations ==
=== Küçük Sırlar (2010) ===
In July 2010, a Turkish-language remake of Gossip Girl titled Küçük Sırlar starring Merve Boluğur as "Ayşegül", an identified version of Gossip Girl, began airing. Sinem Kobal portrays Su (Serena van der Woodsen), Burak Özçivit as Çetin (Chuck Bass), Birkan Sokullu as Demir (Dan Humphrey), İpek Karapınar as Arzu (Blair Waldorf) and Kadir Doğulu as Ali (Nate Archibald). The adaptation deviated from the original series by rewriting the character arcs of Chuck and Blair. The series ended in September 2011, airing a total of 55 episodes.

=== Gossip Girl: Acapulco (2013) ===
A Mexican adaptation was produced by Pedro Torres, subtitled Gossip Girl: Acapulco. The show stars Sofía Sisniega, Oka Giner, Jon Ecker, Vadhir Derbez, Diego Amozurrutia, and Macarena Achaga. Filming began in January 2013 and the series aired on July 5, 2013, on Televisa. The series also aired in the United States on Univision in 2014. It was not renewed for a second season.

=== Gossip Girl: Thailand (2015) ===
The Thai adaptation of Gossip Girl began airing on Channel 3 on July 16, 2015. It lasted for one season, ending in November 2015.

=== The Gossip Girl (2017) ===
On March 5, 2012, it was reported that Warner Bros. International Television and Metan Development Group would produce a Chinese adaptation called China Girl. Production was set to start in June 2012, with the show airing in November, and was designed to follow the lives of students at a university instead of a high school. No news of the actual broadcast followed. The Chinese version ultimately aired over five years later on October 27, 2017, titled The Gossip Girl. It lasted for one season

=== Gossip Girl: Indonesia (2020) ===
An Indonesian adaptation known as Gossip Girl Indonesia was announced during the launch of GoPlay, a video-on-demand service by the country's popular ridesharing app, Gojek, with Nia Dinata as its showrunner. It premiered on the platform on February 14, 2020, and lasted for one season.

== Standalone sequel ==
A standalone sequel series – also titled Gossip Girl and headed by original executive producers Schwartz, Savage and Safran – premiered July 8, 2021, on HBO Max. While set in a shared universe with Kristen Bell voicing Gossip Girl, the sequel focuses on original characters at Constance Billard and is set nine years after the original series.

Safran said the sequel is "a new look at this particular society in New York", while Schwartz confirmed it would serve as a continuation rather than a reboot, despite no initial connection to the original series. Leighton Meester and Chace Crawford were not asked to be part of the sequel, although, in October 2020, Crawford said he was open to making an appearance. In November 2019, Bell's return was confirmed. The series was cancelled in 2023 after two seasons.
