= Birkan =

Birkan is a Turkish masculine given name and surname. Notable people with the name include:

- Birkan Dascilar, Canadian Turkish association football player
- Birkan Batuk (born 1990), Turkish basketball player
- Melis Birkan (born 1982), Turkish actress
- Birkan Sokullu (born 1985), Turkish actor
