= Art of Love (2024 film) =

Turkish romance film

- Film poster
- Turkish: Romantik Hırsız
- Directed by: Recai Karagöz
- Written by: Pelin Karamehmetoğlu
- Produced by: Mine Yilmaz
- Starring: Birkan Sokullu; Esra Bilgiç; Fırat Tanış
- Cinematography: Olcay Oguz
- Edited by: Zeki Öztürk
- Music by: Mert Oktan
- Production company: Lanistar Media
- Distributed by: Netflix
- Release date: 14 March 2024
- Running time: 99 minutes
- Country: Turkey
- Language: Turkish

Art of Love (Turkish: Romantik Hırsız) is a 2024 Turkish romance film directed by Recai Karagöz, written by Pelin Karamehmetoğlu. The film stars Birkan Sokullu, Esra Bilgiç and Fırat Tanış. It was released on Netflix on 14 March 2024.

== Cast ==
- Birkan Sokullu as Güney
- Esra Bilgiç as Alin
- Fırat Tanış as Faysal
- Ushan Çakır as Ozan
- Osman Alkaş
- Nil Keser as Vera
- Hakan Ummak as Ömer

== Production ==
The film was announced by Lanistar Media on Netflix. Principal photography commenced in June 2023. The filming took place in Prague, Czech Republic before moving on to Istanbul, Turkey. Filming wrapped in July 2023. The trailer was released on 19 February 2024.

== Reception ==
On the review aggregator website Rotten Tomatoes, 20% of 5 critics' reviews are positive, with an average rating of 4.3/10. Barbara Shulgasser-Parker of Common Sense Media awarded the film 1/5 stars. Mrinal Rajaram of Cinema Express rated the film 2 out of 5 stars. Sveva Di Palma of Cinematographe.it gave 2.6 stars to the film. Mariam Fakhreddine of The Eastern Echo awarded the film 6.5/10 stars. Gautaman Bhaskaran of News 18 rated the film with 2.5/5 stars.
