= Kırgın Çiçekler =

Turkish television series

- Genre: Drama; Youth; Family; Psychological thriller
- Written by: Gül Abus Semerci; Yelda Eroğlu
- Directed by: Serkan Birinci
- Starring: İpek Karapınar; Özgür Çevik; Biran Damla Yılmaz; Gökçe Akyıldız; Hazar Motan; Çağla Irmak; Aleyna Solaker
- Theme music composer: Tuna Velibaşoğlu
- Opening theme: Rustic Flowers Series Music
- Ending theme: Rustic Flowers Series Music
- Composer: Musicopat (Tim Music Production)
- Country of origin: Turkey
- Original language: Turkish
- No. of seasons: 3
- No. of episodes: 113

Production
- Executive producer: Mehmet Yiğit Alp
- Producer: NTC Media
- Production locations: Istanbul; Istanbul Fenerbahçe College; Istanbul Girls Dormitory
- Running time: Approx. 135–165 minutes

Original release
- Network: ATV
- Release: 29 June 2015 – 12 March 2018

Kırgın Çiçekler (transl. Sad Flowers also known as Orphan Girls) is a Turkish drama/psychological thriller television series that premiered on 29 June 2015. It stars İpek Karapınar, Özgür Çevik, Biran Damla Yılmaz, Gökçe Akyıldız, Hazar Motan, Çağla Irmak and Aleyna Solaker.

The first episode was published on 29 June 2015 and final episode (113) was aired on 12 March 2018. On 12 January 2016, Dizi won the Best Drama Award for the Barrier-free Life Foundation.

It also received the best series award at the award ceremony organized by Istanbul Gelişim University. There are nominations for award ceremonies in Korea and France.

== Plot ==
Eylül is a 16-years-old, young girl. She lost her father when she was 11. She lives in a small shanty with her mother Mesude, sister Büşra and her stepfather Kemal. Eylül is harassed by Kemal. She tells her mother. Her mother did not believe Eylül and gave her away to the orphanage. Orphanage days start from that day for Eylül. There is no connection between Eylül and the 4 girls in the room where Eylül stays. Eylül forms a strong sisterly bond with the other four orphans and the show revolves around the 5 girls, Eylül, Songul, Kader, Cemre and Meral. It focuses on the struggles and hardships they face from the society due to them being orphans and their longing for parents. But their friendship and sisterhood is what makes their relationship stronger and that they can overcome anything together.

The orphans live at an orphanage in an elite area of Istanbul and thus, all five orphans attend a private school alongside elite teenagers of Istanbul. Strong tensions are present between the orphans and elite students at the school but love, crime, and drama force an interconnectedness among the teens.

== Cast and characters ==
=== Main ===
- İpek Karapınar as Feride Güngör Eren: the vice principal of the orphanage. She was supposed to move downstairs to Toprak's house with her fiancé, Vedat but she caught him cheating on her. She is a mother-figure to all 5 girls and cares for them deeply. She later marries Toprak.
- Özgür Çevik as Toprak Eren: an experienced fitness teacher who trusts his students to the full. A well-meaning honest person who loves his profession and children, he is Feride Güngör's neighbour and later husband.

==== As the orphaned Five ====
The characters are girls who were 16 year old at the beginning of the series and shared a room together in an orphanage in Koşuyolu, Kadıköy, Instabul, Turkey.

- Biran Damla Yılmaz as Eylül Acar Göktürk (born 1999): a girl who lived in a small shanty with her mother Mesude, sister Büşra and her stepfather Kemal, having had lost her father when she was 11. She was constantly sexually harassed by Kemal. She told her mother but her mother did not believe Eylül and gave her away to an orphanage. In episode 77, her mother Mesude passes away. She happens to have a relationship with Serkan Özgun but they break up. However, she became Ali's wife later.
- Gökçe Akyıldız as Songül Celen Ertürk (1999 – 2018): The tomboy of the group. She is a stubborn but caring and altruistic friend, as well as the lover and highschool sweetheart of Güney Ertürk. She lost her mother when she was 5, while her father is in prison for murder. Later, their parents want to separate them and they secretly married and resented with their families. She has a daughter, whom her friends and husband take care of her following her death in the finale due to a collision she and the other girls got into when running from the police.
- Hazar Motan as Cemre Derinoğlu: the only daughter of a wealthy family and the original queen bee of Defne's clique. Her father's company was bankrupted, leading her father to attempt suicide, which included accidentally firing a gun at his wife before then intentionally firing a gun at himself. Because her relatives refused to take her, she was forced to live in the orphanage. She changes her mindset and becomes extremely close to the other four girls. Later she learns that her father has another daughter named Zeyno from another relative. Her paternal aunt, Emel, abuses Cemre emotionally while taking drugs which leads Cemre to have hallucinations about her deceased parents. After her aunt loses custody of her niece, Cemre moves back to the orphanage. Shortly after, she becomes temporarily blind following a shootout incident in Feride’s apartments. Defne and her minions bully the blind girl endlessly until she gained vision. Cemre became Gökhan’s lover before his death and later Serkan's girlfriend after he and Eylül breakup.
- Çağla Irmak as Kader Lokumcuzade: an illegitimate child who has hoped to find her parents and return to them, and has also dreamt she was rich. On the day she was born, she was left in sacks of flour. Her mother is the niece of Neriman Hanım, the principal of the orphanage. She finds her mother (Banu), but her mother doesn't want her. Later, her mother kills the child she had after an affair with Güney's father and loses her mind, leading her to be taken to a mental hospital.
- Aleyna Solaker as Meral Kendir: an illegitimate child like Kader. Different from the other girls, she dreams of being a rich model. She can be snobbish and rude at times but deep down she has a kind heart. Later, she finds her mother who worked as a host in a night club belongs to a man named Abbas. When her mother files a case against Abbas and sends him to the prison, she is killed by Abbas' brother. As she witnesses the murder of Abba's brother, she was shot. After being shot, she stays in a coma for a while and returns to life. She is the lover of Mert Atasoy, who formerly dated Kader.

=== Supporting ===
==== As the Yılmaz family ====
- Derya Artemel as Mesude Yılmaz: Mother of Eylül and Büşra Acar, both of whom she had with her first, abusive and late husband. She believed her second husband, Kemal, over her daughter when it came to him harassing her among other things. In the first episode, she left Eylül in an orphanage even though it broke her heart. She was killed by Kemal in the 77th episode.
- Cansu Fırıncı as Kemal Yılmaz: the story's main antagonist, and the stepfather of Eylül Acar, who he lusts and sexually harasses, and Bus. Hated by almost everyone, Kemal was Mesude's second husband, with whom they share a son: Metin. He always lusts after his underaged stepdaughter, Eylül. He also assaults Busra, Eylül's little sister. His downfall is revealed near the end of Season 2.
- Esma Yılmaz as Büşra Acar: Eylül's little sister.

==== As the Ertürk family ====
- Arif Diren as Güney Ertürk: Songül's high school sweetheart. In Songül's second high school, he caused trouble for the orphans and humiliated them but ends up falling for Songül. They got married and later had a daughter.
- Burcu Almeman as Selin Ertürk: Güney's mother. She has a strong dislike towards Songul due to her status living in the orphanage.

==== As the Özgün family ====
- Mehmet Aykaç as Serkan Özgün: the child of a rich family and Defne's twin brother. Serkan is a mature, honest, and helpful young man. For the first he fell in love with Eylül, but then becomes Cemre's lover after their breakup.
- Nil Keser as Defne Özgün: Serkan's twin sister, and Cemre's successor as queen bee and leader of the mean girls, following the death of Cemre's parents and Cemre's placement on the orphanage. She then began tormenting and humiliating her. In contrast to Serkan, Defne is known to be a manipulative liar and spoiled brat always getting out of her way; she was temporarily placed on the orphanage, but left shortly after due to a conflict with Meral and the other girls. She lacks artistic talent such as drawing and singing, and all of her plans eventually fail. Since childhood, she has always loved Guney and is jealous of Songül-Guney's relationship. Her biggest enemies from the five girls are Songül and Meral who cannot stand her. Cemre is her arch-rival and former friend. Kader and Defne don’t fight as much, but Kader defends her sisters regardless. Defne’s relationship with Eylül is a love/hate relationship since Eylül dated Serkan and occasionally helps Defne.
- Veda Yurtsever as Nazan Özgün: Defne and Serkan's adopted mother. At first, she was considered rude and greedy and didn't like girls from the orphanage. She stole Cemre's wealth and inheritance. She tried to separate Serkan and Eylül, but failed. She accidentally killed Gökhan after she crashed her SUV onto his motorcycle. After her stint in prison, her personality changed and became a more nicer and honest person, even helping the five girls. Nazan does not tolerate her daughter Defne's immature behaviour.

==== As the Celen family ====
- Esra Dermancıoğlu as Zehra Celen: Sadullah's second wife, Songül's stepmother and Sedef's mother. A stingy woman.
- Ruhi Sarı as Sabdullah Celen: Songül's father and Zehra's second husband. After he was shot and seriously injured by the moneylenders, he was operated on, he was discharged from the hospital after surgery, and he died of a cerebral hemorrhage in his home bathroom.

==== As the Sönmez family ====
- Sacide Taşaner as Neriman Sönmez: the strict principal of the orphanage in Koşuyolu, the series' main setting.
- Birgen Engin as Banu Savaş: the niece of Neriman, and Kader's estranged and neglectful mother. She abandoned Kader in a flour sack when she was just a baby. She had a child as a result of her affair with Güney's father. Banu later kills Kader's infant sister and is taken to a mental hospital. She dies in a fire in the dormitory.
- Selen Kurteren as Özlem Sönmez: Neriman's daughter, who tries to separate Feride and Toprak to be with Toprak.

==== As the Lokumcuzade family ====
- Deniz Uğur as Macide Lokumcuzade: Sadri's wife. She doesn't let Sadri speak with his granddaughter. She left the series in episode 107.
- Eylül Su Sapan as Harika Lokumcuzade: Macide's daughter. In episode 93, she finds Kader in the basement of their summer house. She later learns that the person who kidnapped her was Ejder and dies in an accident while on his way to the police station to report him.
- Erdoğan Sıcak as Sadri Lokumcuzade: Kader's grandfather, but he thinks Meral is his own granddaughter. He dies in episode 92.

==== Others ====
- Zeynep Irgat as Hediye: maid of the orphanage who is close to the 5 girls.
- Furkan Andıç as Gökhan Turalı: the child of a maid in Cemre's house. Years later, they met at the same school. He has been in love with Cemre since his childhood, but due to the class difference between them, he threw himself into the background. Years later he and Cemre eventually became lovers, but he died after an accident because of Nazan on his way to tell Cemre about the legacy that Nazan stole.
- Kaan Kasapoğlu as Mert Atasoy: He dates Kader. After his breakup with Kader, he tries to win Songül's heart but fails. He later fells in love with Meral, but he breakup with Meral in final episode due to unknown reason.
- Seda Güngör as Merve Gül: Defne's best friend and sidekick who belittles the orphan girls. Her biggest enemies from the five girls are Cemre, Kader, and Söngul. She leaves in Episode 77 due to poor grades and the bad influence both Defne and Aleyna give to her and is never seen or heard again.
- Dilrara Mücaviroğlu as Aleyna Köksal: The third member of Defne's clique who also dislikes the orphanage girls. Ironically, she was temporarily humiliated by both Defne and Merve. In return, she played a dirty trick towards Defne while finding her biological mother. Aleyna's biggest enemies from the orphan girls are Eylul and Cemre. She left the series in the season 2 finale (episode 88). Finally, in episode 106, Defne learned that Aleyna had a boyfriend.
- Birgül Ulusoy as Emine Turalı: Gökhan's mother.
- Hülya Gülşen Irmak as Nezhiye: the woman Kemal liked episodes 45-49.
- Nil Günal as Emel Derinoğlu: Cemre's paternal aunt. She tries to make Cemre go insane so that she can steal her legacy.
- Benan Yüce as Zuhal: Cenk's mother
- Ali Fuat Onan as Ayhan Yılmaz: Kemal's father
- Pınar Şenol as Figen Derinoğlu: Zeyno's mother
- Gökçe Yanardağ as Seher Karaman: Meral's mother. Abbas' brother kills her and leaves the dead body in a garbage container.
- Cüneyt Şen as İhsan: Seher's killer.
- Kadir Çermik as Necmi: Gokhan's father.
- Yağmur Ün as Zeyno Derinoğlu: Cemre's half-sister.
- Burak Arslan as Burak: The resident bad boy of Koşuyolu Koleji. He started a fire in the school dance, and appeared in a school field trip much to his classmates' disgust and anger. He is expelled from the school and leaves the series in Episode 50.
- Almila Ada as Lalin: she lives in the orphanage with the girls.
- Makbule Meyzinioğlu as Canan: an organ mafia dealer who tricked Defne convincing herself as the biological mother.
- Burak Tozkoparan as Ali Göktürk Komiser: a policeman. He later became Eylül's boyfriend and they marry in the finale.
- Hazal Benli as Fadik Komiser: a police from the branch who works with Ali.
- Tayanç Ayaydın as Ejder Lokumcuzade: Sadri's nephew.
- Özgür Başol as Tuna: he takes money from Nazan and come close Cemre to separate Serkan and Cemre.
- Bülent Düzgünoğlu as Yavuz: Defne and Serkan's biological father. He was killed by Kader in episode 109.

== International broadcasting ==
Country	Network	Series premiere
Indonesia	ANTV	3 Oktober 2016
Romania	Acasă TV	23 January 2017
Sri Lanka	TV Derana	23 April 2018
Lithuania	LNK	5 June 2019
Albania	TV Klan	13 January 2020- 8 April 2021
North Macedonia	Sitel TV	26 September 2020 – 16 July 2021
Spain	Divinity	10 January 2022
Greece	Mega Channel	27 March 2017
Slovakia	TV Doma	
