= Merve Boluğur =

Turkish actress and model (born 1987)

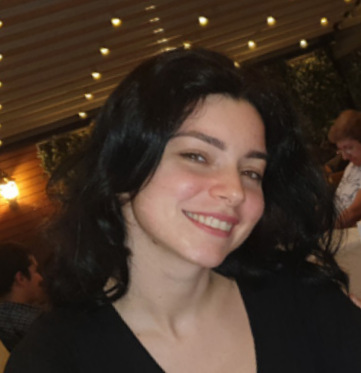
- Born: 16 September 1987 (age 38); Istanbul, Turkey
- Occupations: Actress; model
- Years active: 2005–present
- Spouses: Murat Dalkılıç (m. 2015; div. 2017) Mert Aydın (m. 2022; div. 2022)

Merve Boluğur (born 16 September 1987) is a Turkish actress and model. She is well known for her roles in the fantasy series Acemi Cadı (the Turkish version of Sabrina the Teenage Witch), Küçük Sırlar (the Turkish version of Gossip Girl), Kuzey Güney and the historical series Muhteşem Yüzyıl.

== Filmography ==
=== Film ===
Year	Title	Role	Notes
2006	Keloğlan Kara Prens'e Karşı	Birgül	
2007	Gomeda	Aysen	
2008	Hoşçakal Güzin	Bahar	Television film

=== Television ===
Year	Title	Role	Notes
2006–07	Acemi Cadı	Ayşegül	58 Episodes
2007	Aşk Yeniden	Eylül	
2009	Kül ve Ateş	Hayal İsfendiyar	9 Episodes
2010–11	Küçük Sırlar	Ayşegül Yalçın	55 Episodes
2011–13	Kuzey Güney	Zeynep Çiçek	69 Episodes
2013–14	Muhteşem Yüzyıl	Nurbanu Sultan	36 Episodes (Season 4)
2017	İçimdeki Fırtına	Ezgi Kara Bademli	6 Episodes

=== Music videos ===
Year	Title	Artist	Ref(s)
2010	Kadınım	Kolpa	

== Discography ==
Year	Title	Featuring	Album
2016	Boya Gitsin	Murat Dalkılıç	Epik
2022	Şşşşttt	—N/a	Non-album single

== Personal life ==
On 24 August 2015, Boluğur married Murat Dalkılıç at Adile Sultan Palace. On 11 August 2017, they filed for divorce, which was finalized on 11 September 2017. Boluğur married DJ Mert Aydın on 2 October 2022. They divorced on 23 November 2022.
