= Eric Daman =

American costume designer (born 1970)

- Born: August 21, 1970 (age 56); Monroe, Michigan, U.S.
- Occupations: Costume designer; stylist; author
- Website: ericdamanstyle.wordpress.com

Eric Daman (born on August 21, 1970) is an American costume designer, fashion model, television personality, and author. Known for costume design and fashion styling on the American television series Sex and the City and Gossip Girl as well as designs for various products.

== Early life and education ==
Daman was born on August 21, 1970, in Monroe, Michigan, to Douglas and Maryann Daman. When he was 18, Daman began his undergraduate education at Wabash College, a small, private, liberal arts college for men, located in Crawfordsville, Indiana. He later transferred to Paris-Sorbonne University, a public research university in Paris, France, where he earned a bachelor's degree in French Literature at age 22.

== Career ==
Daman began his career in the early 1990s as a fashion model in Paris. From there, Daman began working in the United States behind the scenes as a fashion stylist for photo advertising shoots and then television costume designer and set stylist. He also has designed luxury goods products.

=== 1990s ===
While at Paris-Sorbonne University in 1991, Daman met Steven Meisel, an American fashion photographer who obtained popular acclaim through his work in US and Italian Vogue magazine and his photographs of friend Madonna for her 1992 book, Sex. Meisel use Daman as a fashion model in some of his work, eventually pairing Daman with Kate Moss, a model from England known for her waifish figure and popularizing the heroin chic look in the 1990s. Through Meisel's work, Moss and Daman appeared together in a series of Calvin Klein advertisements. Other photographers such as Pierre et Gilles, Mario Testino, and Peter Lindbergh used Daman in their advertising work and Daman eventually appeared as a fashion model on the cover and within L'Uomo Vogue, among other publications.

In 1998 at the age of 28, Daman moved from Paris to New York City and began a career behind the scenes working as a fashion stylist in photo shoots with American fashion photographer Terry Richardson. Together, their work was published in magazines such as Spin, I.D., The Face (magazine), and Visionaire. Daman additionally worked as a creative consultant to fashion designer Miguel Adrover, assisting sweater-maker Pierre ("Pierrot") Carrilero in providing Adrover's line of sweaters.

=== 2000s ===
In 2001, American costume designer, stylist and fashion designer Patricia Field hired Daman as an assistant costume designer to work with Sex and the City executive producer Sarah Jessica Parker to update the fashion and styling of that then-popular American television comedy-drama series with a more editorial tone that conveyed a downtown New York City style.

After winning the Primetime Emmy Award, Daman began collaborating with a number of private companies as a designer of men's and women's apparel, as well as women's accessories. For example, in 2008, clothing retailer Charlotte Russe hired Daman as Creative Director. Since then Daman has also designed a number of collections of dresses for Charlotte Russe.

In 2009, Daman's designs for American teen drama television series Gossip Girl earned him a nomination for 2008 Outstanding Contemporary Television Series from the Costume Designers Guild.

=== 2010s ===
In 2011 Daman created a capsule collection of hosiery with fashion design label DKNY called Eric Daman for DKNY. A year later in 2012 Daman designed a collection of jewelry for Swarovski, a Wattens, Austria based designer and manufacturer of cut crystal and related luxury products. The Daman collection appeared as the subject of a series of Swarovski-produced webisodes that were entitled "The Daman Chronicles" and premiered online at Cambio.com in June, 2012.

In July 2012, The New York Times described Daman's costume design work for Gossip Girl as being as much a part of the creation of a character as the show's writers. Daman design work has contributed to Gossip Girl fictional characters Blair Waldorf, Serena van der Woodsen, and Chuck Bass being listed as TV's best dressed in popular press articles.

Named as one of "the 7 influencers" who "could change everything about the way we look" in 2010 by the New York-based women's beauty magazine Allure,

== Awards ==
In 2002, Daman was awarded for the 2002 Primetime Emmy Award for Outstanding Costumes for a Series.

== Filmography ==
=== Film ===
Year	Title	Director	Notes	Ref.
1998	The Adventures of Sebastian Cole	Tod Williams		
2004	The Door in the Floor	Tod Williams		
2005	Forty Shades of Blue	Ira Sachs		
2006	The Architect	Matt Tauber		
2007	Anamorph	Henry S. Miller		
2008	The Guitar	Amy Redford		
2009	Tenderness	John Polson		
2012	Fun Size	Josh Schwartz		
2015	The DUFF	Ari Sandel		
2018	Love, Simon	Greg Berlanti		
2024	It Ends with Us	Justin Baldoni		
2025	Peter Hujar's Day	Ira Sachs	With Khadija Zeggaï	

=== Television ===
Year	Title	Notes	Ref.
1999–2001	Sex and the City	Costume assistant only (seasons 2–4)	
2007–2012	Gossip Girl		
2013–2014	The Carrie Diaries		
2015	The Astronaut Wives Club		
2016–2020	Billions	Seasons 1–5	
2021–2023	Gossip Girl		

== Media appearances ==
Daman has appeared on E! News, The Rachel Ray Show, America's Next Top Model and Project Runway All-Stars.

== Publications ==
Daman's first book, You Know You Want It: Style—Inspiration—Confidence, was published by Clarkson Potter/Random House in December 2009.
