= Murat Dalkılıç =

Turkish pop singer (born 1983)

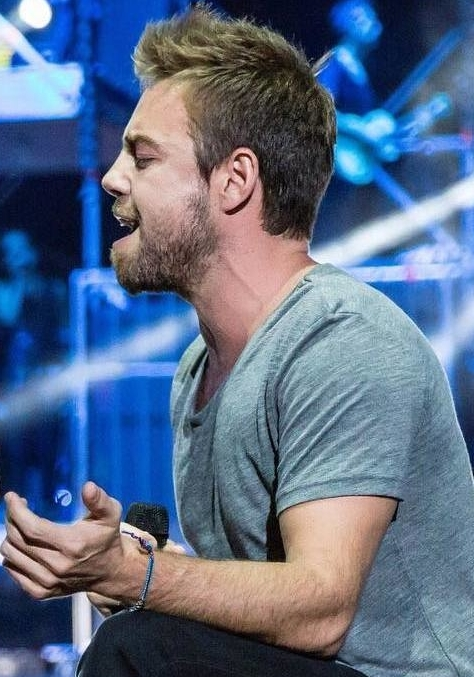
- Dalkılıç performing at the Cemil Topuzlu Open-Air Theatre in August 2016
- Born: Sırrı Murat Dalkılıç; 7 August 1983 (age 43); İzmir, Turkey
- Occupations: Singer-songwriter; actor
- Spouse: Merve Boluğur (m. 2015; div. 2017)
- Musical career
- Genres: Pop; dance
- Instrument: Guitar
- Years active: 2008–present
- Labels: Dokuz Sekiz; Sony; Kaya; DMC; Poll; Avrupa
- Website: muratdalkilic.com

Sırrı Murat Dalkılıç (born 7 August 1983) is a Turkish pop singer, songwriter, music producer, film and animation producer, director and actor.

== Career ==
Murat Dalkılıç was born in İzmir and lived in Kuşadası. He studied piano at the age of 15 and founded his first music group. At a young age, he was also interested in basketball, athleticism, swimming enrolling in Kuşadası Spor Basketball team where he played professionally at age 17 and had to put his music career on hold. He won the medals in Grand Atatürk Run and swimming contest.

He studied at acting department of Beykent University. After graduation, he enrolled in the Master program in Bilgi University specializing in acting in Cinema-Television. He also had international film, music and animation company "Gig Production". Onur Can Çaylı who worked in Game of Thrones, Avengers: Age of Ultron, The Hunger Games: Catching Fire, joined this company. Murat Dalkılıç is also director of film "Ustalar Alemi" and short film "19 Mayıs 100. yıl" . He played in Dünya Hali, Bizans Oyunları, Sil Baştan, Mazlum Kuzey. In December 2020, he appeared as a guest in an episode of the TV series Menajerimi Ara.

=== Music ===
His first single "Kasaba" (meaning "town") written by Soner Sarıkabadayı and music composed by Tolga Kılıç was released in October 2008 by Dokuz Sekiz Müzik label gained popularity after being picked by Turkish radio stations. Soon a music video followed that was launched in December 2008. The video featured Dalkılıç' friend Murat Boz. The single reached No.1 on the Türkçe Top 20 chart and stayed at the top of the Turkish charts for a total of seven weeks. He released EP "Kasaba" including his own song and a cover song. He was signed in 2009 to "Sony Music Entertainment", recording three albums.

His first album "Merhaba" released on 4 June 2010. Music clips of songs "La Fontaine", "Külah", "Kıyamadım İkimize", "Merhaba Merhaba", "Dönmem" ve "Çatlat" in the album were released.

His second album had three other singles: "Kader", "Bi Hayli" and "Lüzumsuz Savaş", which topped the charts in 2012. His 2012 single "Bir Güzellik Yap" in same album also topped the Türkçe Top 20.

"İki Yol", "Yani" and "Leyla" were the other singles of the third album. His 2014 single "Derine" also topped the charts. The music video was 9 minutes with a lot of actions and his partner was Özge Özpirincci who is a Turkish famous actress.

He wrote the lyrics of "Kırk Yılda Bir Gibisin" song which was featured on Emrah Karaduman's album. He composed "Ben Kalp Sen" for the series Aşk Yeniden. He is composer of "Fırça" and co-composer of "Şahaneyim" which was performed by Zeynep Bastık. His fourth album Epik was released in 2016 and its first music video "Ben Bilmem" was filmed by Bedran Güzel. His fifth album "Afeta" was released in 2019.

== Personal life ==
From 2015 to 2017, Dalkılıç was married to actress Merve Boluğur. From 2017 to mid-2020, he was in a relationship with actress Hande Erçel. In 2022, he was in a relationship with actress Sitare Akbas; the two split after eight months of dating.

== Discography ==
=== Studio albums ===
List of albums
Album	Album info
Merhaba	Released: 4 June 2010; Label: Sony; Format: CD, digital download
Bir Güzellik Yap	Released: 15 May 2012; Label: Kaya; Format: CD, digital download
Daha Derine	Released: 24 June 2014; Label: DMC; Format: CD, digital download
Epik	Released: 14 July 2016; Label: Poll; Format: CD, digital download
Afeta	Released: 22 November 2019; Label: Poll; Format: CD, digital download

=== EPs ===
List of EPs
Album	Album info
Kasaba	Released: 21 November 2008; Label: DSM; Format: CD, digital download

=== Charts ===
List of singles, release date and album name
Single	Year	Peak	Album
Single	Year	TR	Album
"Kasaba"	2008	1	Kasaba
"La Fontaine"	2009	2	Merhaba
"Külah"	2010	6	Merhaba
"Kıyamadım İkimize"	2010	3	Merhaba
"Merhaba Merhaba"	2010	4	Merhaba
"Şık Şık" (with Volga Tamöz and Hepsi)	2011	—	Non-album single
"Bir Güzellik Yap"	2012	1	Bir Güzellik Yap
"Kader"	2012	2	Bir Güzellik Yap
"Lüzumsuz Savaş"	2012	1	Bir Güzellik Yap
"Bir Hayli"	2013	2	Bir Güzellik Yap
"Bu Nasıl Aşk"	2014	7	Daha Derine
"Derine"	2014	3	Daha Derine
"Kırk Yılda Bir Gibisin" (with Emrah Karaduman)	2014	—	Toz Duman
"Ben Bilmem"	2016	3	Epik
"Soktuğu Duruma Bak"	2016	6	Epik
"Aşinayız" (feat. Oğuzhan Koç)	2017	1	Non-album single
"Sevdanın Tadı"	2018	—	Yıldız Tilbe'nin Yıldızlı Şarkıları
"Son Liman"	2019	5	Afeta
"Orta Yol"	2020	—	Non-album single
"Bu Gece"	2020	—	Mesaj
"Yerin Dibi"	2021	—	Non-album single
"Nefes"	2021	—	Non-album single
"Bi Dolu Hiç"	2021	—	Non-album single
"CHE"	2022	—	Non-album single
"Can" (feat. Feride Hilal Akın)	2023	—	Non-album single
"—" indicates that the songs were not included in the lists or the results were not disclosed.

=== Music videos ===
List of music videos
Video	Year	Director
"Kasaba"	2008	Eyüp Dirlik
"La Fontaine"	2009	—N/a
"Külah"	2010	Mehmet Turgut
"Kıyamadım İkimize"	2010	Murat Dalkılıç
"Merhaba Merhaba"	2010	Murat Onbul
"Dönmem"	2011	Murat Dalkılıç
"Çatlat"	2011	Sedat Doğan
"Bir Güzellik Yap"	2012	Murad Küçük
"Kader"	2012	Gülşen Aybaba
"Lüzumsuz Savaş"	2012	Murat Dalkılıç
"Bir Hayli"	2013	Deniz Coşkun
"Neyleyim İstanbul'u (Acoustic)"	2013	Barış Kırımşelioğlu
"Bu Nasıl Aşk"	2014	Sedat Doğan
"Derine"	2014	Gülşen Aybaba
"Kördüğüm"	2015	Gülşen Aybaba
"Yani"	2015	Sedat Doğan
"İki Yol"	2015	Murat Dalkılıç
"Leyla"	2016	Oğuzhan Uğur and Tuğrul Uğur
"Ben Bilmem"	2016	Bedran Güze
"Soktuğu Duruma Bak"	2016	Serkan Balak
"Daha İyisi Gelene Kadar"	2017	Murat Dalkılıç
"Aşinayız"	2017	Bedran Güzel
"Rivayet"	2017	Orsen Şengül
"Son Liman"	2019	Cem Talu
"Kim Kafa Tutabilmiş Aşka"	2019	Gülşen Aybaba
"Afeta"	2020	Ecem Gündoğdu
"Müjgan"	2020	Ecem Gündoğdu
"Orta Yol"	2020	Behzat Uygur
"Bu Gece"	2020	Behzat Uygur
"Yerin Dibi"	2021	Behzat Uygur
"Nefes"	2021	Behzat Uygur
"Bi Dolu Hiç"	2021	Behzat Uygur
"CHE"	2022	Coşkun Turgut
"Can"	2023	Yusuf Akbal

== Filmography ==
=== Director ===
- Ustalar Alemi
- 19 Mayıs 100. yıl (short film)

=== Television ===
Year	Title	Role	Director
2013	Sil Baştan	Himself	
2014	Söyle Söyleyebilirsen	Himself (presenter)	
2020/2021	Menajerimi Ara	Himself	Deniz Çelebi Dikilitaş
2022	Maske Kimsin Sen?	Himself (guest judge)	

=== Film ===
Year	Title	Role	Director
2014	Mazlum Kuzey	Doctor	Ali Adnan Özgür
2016	Bizans Oyunları	Muhteris	Gani Mujde
2018	Dünya Hali	Serdar	Ömer Can

=== Web ===
Year	Title	Role	Director
2022	Sen Yaşamaya Bak	(producer)	
2022	Sadece Arkadaşız		
2022	Recep İvedik 7	Himself	
