= Fatih Harbiye =

Turkish television series

- Written by: Hayriye Ersöz
- Directed by: Sadullah Celen
- Starring: Kadir Doğulu; Neslihan Atagül; Yunus Emre Yıldırımer; Dilara Öztunç; Seda Türkmen; Itir Esen; Gökçe Akyıldız
- Theme music composer: Emre Dündar; Murat Uncuoglu; Cem Yıldız
- Country of origin: Turkey
- Original language: Turkish
- No. of seasons: 2
- No. of episodes: 50

Production
- Producer: Ata Türkoglu
- Running time: 115 minutes (average)
- Production company: Koliba Film

Original release
- Network: Fox; Show TV
- Release: 31 August 2013 – 10 December 2014

Fatih Harbiye ("In Between") is a Turkish television series that aired from August 2013 to December 2014. The show is based on the 1931 novel with the same title written by Peyami Safa. In 1992, it was made into a mini series, starring Aydan Şener, Tolga Savacı.

== Synopsis ==
The TV show presents two sides of Istanbul: In Fatih, a poor neighborhood, Neriman Sölmaz has dreams of becoming a famous artist. She leaves university in her third year while her childhood friend Şinasi, who is in love with her, goes to study music.

Harbiye, Beyoğlu, is an upper class modern European neighborhood where Macit Arcaoğlu lives. Macit is the son of artist İnci and businessman Kerim.

Kerim wants Macit to marry his friend Selim Demirhan's daughter Pelin.

Selim is the brother of Neriman's mother, Nazan, but due to a feud between Neriman's father Faiz and Selim they don't have contact to each other. Selim has two daughters, Pelin and Duygu. One day Neriman and her best friend Fahriye meet them and are invited to a party at Macit's house.

Neriman goes to the party, and she meets Macit there. Macit falls in love with Neriman at first sight and takes her to a boat to be alone with her. Neriman is scared because of what happened to Şinasi's sister Aslı. She falls into the water and Macit saves her life. After that day they start seeing each other and falling in love with each other, much to the dislike of Pelin who is in love with Macit herself.

== Cast ==
Actor	Character
Kadir Doğulu	Macit Arcaoğlu
Neslihan Atagül	Neriman Solmaz
Yunus Emre Yildirimer	Şinasi
Dilara Öztunç	Pelin Demirhan
Seda Türkmen	Fahriye
Oktay Korunan	Faiz Solmaz
Uğur Demirpehlivan	Gülter
Süeda Çil	Zehra
Gökçe Akyıldız	Aslı
Yusuf Baymaz	Emre
Pinar Dikici	Şahika
Sevinç Sırma	Nezahat
Firat Topkorur	Cihan
Olcay Yusufoğlu	Duygu
Itir Esen	Inci Arcaoğlu
Özhan Carda	Kerim Arcaoğlu
Gamze Süner Atay	Feyza Demirhan
Mehmet Uslu	Selim Demirhan
Ebru Sam	Özlem
Seher Terzi	Kader
Şadi Aymutlu	İsmail
Özgürcan Çevik	Onur
Kahraman Sivri	Cemal Usta
Başak Parlak	Rüya
Emre Yılmaz	Özgür
Ateş Fatih Uçan	Asım
Murat Göksu	Nadir
Serkan Şenalp	Bora
Barış Hacıhan	Aras
Ergün Demir	Erdinç

== International broadcasting ==
Country	Network	Local title	Series premiere	Timeslot	Episodes
Somaliland	Horn Cable Television	Rabitaanka Naftayda	25 July 2017	21:00	175
Croatia	Nova TV	Pitanje časti	13 June 2016		
Bulgaria	Diema Family	Двете лица на Истанбул	24 June 2015		126
Romania	Kanal D	Un destin la răscruce	24 August 2015	20:00	
North Macedonia	Alfa TV	Рането срце	23 September 2015		
Albania	Vision Plus	Mes Dy Dashurish	15 May 2019		
Philippines	SolarFlix	In Between	2023		
