= Biran Damla Yılmaz =

Turkish actress

- Born: 28 June 1997 (age 29); Istanbul, Turkey
- Occupations: Actress, model
- Years active: 2014–present
- Television: Kırgın Çiçekler

Biran Damla Yılmaz (born 28 June 1997) is a Turkish actress. She is known for Eylül in Kırgın Çiçekler.

== Education ==
Her family works in film industry. After studying at a conservatory, she started her acting career in 2014 while still being a student. Her first notable role, which marked her television debut, was a role in the TV series Yasak. Her breakthrough came when she was cast in the series Kırgın Çiçekler. Ever since she has continued her career both in television and cinema. In 2020, she was cast in a leading role in the series Baraj, an adaptation of Türkan Şoray, Tarık Akan's 1977 Turkish movie with the same name.

== Filmography ==
=== Television ===
Title	Role	Year	Channel
Muhteşem Yüzyıl	Cariye	2013-2014	Star TV
Yasak	Esma	2014	atv
Beyaz Yalan	Nesrin	2015	Show TV
Kırgın Çiçekler	Eylül Acar Göktürk	2015–2018	atv
Canevim	Ceylan Hakseven	2019	atv
Baraj	Nehir Aksu Güney	2020–2021	FOX
Yasak Elma	Kumru Yıldırım	2021–2023	FOX
Maske Kimsin Sen?	Herself	2022	FOX
Hudutsuz Sevda	Yasemin	2023	FOX
Kopuk	İpek Kasay	2024	FOX
Halef: Köklerin Çağrısı	Yıldız Taşçı Yelduran	2025–	Now

=== Film ===
Title	Role	Year
Çılgın Dersane 4: Ada	Deniz	2015
Mucize 2: Aşk	Mızgin	2019
Prestij Meselesi	Gölhan	2023
Hayatla Barış	Zeynep	2024
