= Kemal Doğulu =

Turkish photographer (born 1979)

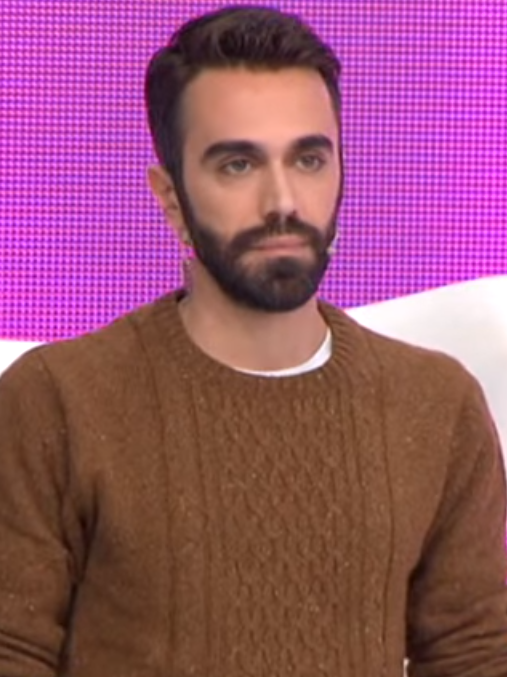
- Doğulu on İşte Benim Stilim in 2015
- Born: 14 October 1979 (age 47); Mersin, Turkey
- Education: Harran University (left)
- Occupations: Photographer; hairdresser; stylist; singer; director
- Years active: 2004–present
- Relatives: Kadir Doğulu (brother)
- Musical career
- Genre: Pop
- Years active: 2008–present
- Labels: Erol Köse; Sony; Arista; Poll; PDND; Alim
- Website: kemaldogulu.com

Kemal Doğulu (born 14 October 1979) is a Turkish photographer, hairdresser, stylist and singer.

== Life and career ==
Doğulu was born in 1979 in Mersin as the eldest child of Nur and Rasim Doğulu. His brother Kadir Doğulu is an actor. His father went to the US for work when Doğulu was 12 and he started working as a hairdresser alongside his cousin. Due to his uncle's insistence, he enrolled in an İmam Hatip school but was not successful in Quran courses. Without his family's knowledge, he participated in the Anadolu High School exams and enrolled in the computer studies courses. He then studied marketing at Harran University. He then moved to Istanbul and worked in his cousin Zeki Doğulu's place as a hairdresser. He soon began working as a makeup artist and photographer and his works were published in Elle magazine.

Doğulu worked as an image consultant, make-up artist, hairdresser, photographer and modelist for artists such as Hande Yener, Seda Sayan, Sıla, Kutsi, Gökhan Özen, Nil Karaibrahimgil, and Demet Akalın a long time. In 2006, he met Hande Yener and worked as her photographer and image consultant for her EP Hande Maxi. After forming a friendship with Yener, he became the art director, photographer and director of her subsequent music videos and albums.

He started his singing career by replacing Hande Yener's back vocalist in a concert. Hande Yener and Erol Temizel liked Doğulu's voice and helped him with his first work. In January 2008, he released his first EP, titled 1 Yerde, which featured elements of electronic music. The first music video for the EP was made for the song "1 Yerde", the album's namesake. It was broadcast on MTV Türkiye in February 2008. The next month it was shown all on MTV channels across the globe, after which the song entered the World Chart Exskpress (World Top 10) chart and rose to the first place in April. The second music video from the EP, titled "Nedense, Nedense?", was recorded in late July and broadcast on 3 August 2008 on Kral TV.

Doğulu then started working on his second single, "Kemal Doğulu 2", the photographs for which were taken by Hande Yener. The single cover was first released on his official website. The single featured one new song and a cover song. The song "Uzayda Aşk Var" was composed and arranged by Erol Temizel and written by Soner Arıcı. On 11 July 2009, his song "Kemal Doğulu" was released on the finale of Disko Kralı. A music video for "Uzayda Aşk Var" was recorded in September 2009 and broadcast on 30 September 2009 on Kral TV. Doğulu appeared in the video along with his celebrity friends, including Hande Yener. It was directed by Doğulu himself.

He then started working on an album, titled Ters Köşe. It was produced by Hande Yener and Alper Narman, who also wrote and composed songs for the album. In addition to Yene and Narman, artists such as Ertuğ Ergin, Sıla and Erol Temizel also contributed to the work.

Doğulu rose to prominence through his appearance as a styling and fashion judge on a number of television programs. In September 2014, he became a judge on the program Bu Tarz Benim alongside Ivana Sert and Nur Yerlitaş. He continued his career as a judge with the İşte Benim Stilim reality competition show. He returned to the TV screens in November 2019 with the program Doya Doya Moda.

== Discography ==
- 1 Yerde (2008)
- Kemal Doğulu 2 (2009)
- Ters Köşe (2010)
- 4. Kemal (2011)
- Aşk Kabul Ederse (2012)
- Duygusal (2015)
- Selfie (2017)
- Kasma (2020)
- Paranoya (2021)

=== Music videos ===
- "1 Yerde" (12 January 2008)
- "Nedense, Nedense?" (3 August 2008)
- "Uzayda Aşk Var" (30 September 2009)
- "Makaslı Film" (21 October 2010)
- "Üzgünüm" (22 January 2011)
- "Oynuyorum" (1 August 2011)
- "Aşk Kabul Ederse" (1 December 2012)
- "Selfie" (3 July 2017)

== Filmography ==
Television programs

- Bu Tarz Benim (2014)
- İşte Benim Stilim (2015–2017)
- Doya Doya Moda (2019–)
- Kemal Doğulu ile Büyük Değişim (2021)
- Tarzını Seveyim (2024)
