= Küçük Sırlar =

- Also known as: Little Secrets
- Genre: Teen drama
- Created by: Cecily von Ziegesar (books), Josh Schwartz and Stephanie Savage (original TV series)
- Written by: Nukhet Bıçakçı; Aylin Alıveren
- Directed by: Kerem Çakıroğlu; Cevriye Demir
- Starring: Sinem Kobal; Merve Boluğur; Burak Özçivit; Birkan Sokullu; İpek Karapınar; Kadir Doğulu; Gonca Vuslateri; Ecem Uzun; Mehmetcan Mincinozlu
- Opening theme: "Kal" by Teoman & Atiye Deniz
- Country of origin: Turkey
- Original language: Turkish
- No. of seasons: 1
- No. of episodes: 55

Production
- Producer: Timur Savcı
- Running time: 90 minutes
- Production companies: Tims Productions; Warner Bros. Television; Warner Bros. International Television Production

Original release
- Network: Kanal D (2010); Star TV (2010-2011)
- Release: July 2010 – September 2011

Little Secrets (Turkish: Küçük Sırlar) is a Turkish teen drama television series aimed at teenagers and based on the American television series Gossip Girl (2007–2012), It was produced by Tims Productions and Warner Bros. International Television Production International Television. The series originally ran on Kanal D from July 2010 to November 2010 and then on Star TV from October 2010 to September 2011.

After the years, Sinem Kobal and Birkan Sokullu played in series "Yüz Yüze". Burak Özçivit and İpek Karapınar played in series "Kuruluş: Osman". Birkan Sokullu and Seda Akman played in series "Masumlar Apartmanı". Gonca Vuslateri and Ecem Uzun performed the play "Martı/Seagull" and series "Aliye". Sinem Kobal and Gonca Vuslateri played in series "Gönül İşleri". Sinem Kobal and Mehmetcan Mincinözlü played in series "Lise Defteri". Kadir Doğulu and Dilara Öztunç played in series "Fatih Harbiye". Merve Boluğur, Burak Özçivit, Kadir Doğulu, Yıldırım Fikret Urağ played in different seasons of series "Muhteşem Yüzyıl"

== Main characters ==
Ayşegül (Gossip Girl), (Merve Boluğur) a popular and manipulative girl. She writes about gossips and fashion for "Küçük Sırlarım" newspaper. Ayşegül is a trendsetter in high school because her style is attentively watched by other girls. Ayşegül is a ruthless and cheeky leader. She only becomes friends with people who can be useful to her. She want to discover that Su isn't an innocent girl. Her autistic brother Memo find outs Ayşegül's sensitive side.

Su (Serena), (Sinem Kobal) a beautiful, intelligent and sportive girl. She belongs to the people who are the objects of jealousy because of their advantages. Su lives with her granny and loves her father a lot. Su lives like in the imaginary world, she even borrowed her Twitter nickname from her favorite book Alice's Adventures in Wonderland. Even though she seems nice she is a bad friend and acts as if she is always right. She is really annoying and acts like the world belongs to her.

Çetin (Chuck), (Burak Özçivit) a cynical, pessimistic but very handsome guy. He is a senior in high school. Çetin is not only good-looking, he is also smart. The best satisfaction for him is to steer things up, hide and watch the confusion he created. He also likes to seduce girls but he doesn't have permanent girlfriend. Çetin is the son of one of the richest people of the country. His father married a second time with mother of Ayşegül. But Çetin dissatisfied with that marriage and he doesn't want to live with Ayşegül in one house. Çetin wishes someone who he can trust in this world. So Çetin thinks to fall in love with innocent Su. But Ayşegül reminds Çetin's dark side and old unfinished love story.

Demir (Dan), Birkan Sokullu the only student who goes to school by bus, not by personal car. He's fond of cooking, playing guitar, reading and photography. He is often called upon to solve the problems of his younger sister Meriç. Demir has hopelessly fallen in love with Su. Sometimes, he can be the only who Ayşegül's friend and Ayşegül helps him about Su. When he works at hotel of Çetin's father, his rise fast at work started.

Ali (Nate), Kadir Doğulu a young man who is used to getting everything he desires. His parents are successful architects but they don't care about son. So Ali can behave as he wants, selfish and provocative. His girlfriend is Ayşegül. However, Ali made a bet for a car to date with Su. All girls will hate him. But Arzu is obsessed lover.

Arzu (Blair), İpek Karapınar Su's best friend. Girl with a continuous struggle between loyalty and envy to her best friend. Arzu's mother is fashion designer, single mother, very beautiful woman, but it only hurts Arzu, causing her to have low self-esteem. In fact, she always is on the verge of nervous breakdown. She salves by playing violin and swimming more than antidepressant drugs. Although she lost the baby due to Ali, or Ali always cheats on her, she continues toxic relationship with Ali. So she can hurt everybody including herself and Ali.

== Plot ==
A world, sparkling, dazzling and seductive.

And the dark side of that world, betrayal, lies and the most dangerous games imaginable.

Little Secrets tells the story of the fun yet harsh sides of young people whose glamorous and sparkling lives center on romance and popularity; and it also tells the stories of their families, which are dark, complicated and interwoven with despair and hatred as well as with love in darling and striking manners as never been told before. The series is centered on the lifestyles of young people in a world where appearance is everything and yet nobody is as they seem.

Almost all characters in Little Secrets live inside a “display window”. We recognize pretty much all of them from the second page news in newspapers’ magazine supplements. That's why while they seem so far away, they are actually very close. While they may fight in bigger arenas with much stronger enemies, their wounds, feelings, romances, love affairs and hatred are just like ours.

There are no limits to the money they own and the power that comes with it. In such a world of opportunities, it is impossible to hold onto one's love, friends, family and one's own self.

But what about none's innocence?

== Starring ==
Character	Actor
Su Mabeynci	Sinem Kobal
Çetin "Çet" Ateşoğlu	Burak Özçivit
Demir Karaman	Birkan Sokullu
Ayşegül Yalçın	Merve Boluğur
Ali Eraslan	Kadir Doğulu
Arzu Alpaslan	İpek Karapınar
Meriç Karaman	Ecem Uzun
Aslan Cem Mabeynci	Mehmetcan Mincinözlü
Emre Mabeynci	Hakkı Ergök
Ömer Ateşoğlu	Yıldırım Urağ
Ceyla Turgut	Gonca Vuslateri
Heves Turan	Dilara Öztunç
Fikriye Mabeynci	Yıldız Kültür
Şebnem Mabeynci	Şenay Gürler
Biricik Alpaslan	Ebru Akel
Neslişah Ateşoğlu	Enginay Gültekin
Tunç	Ata Benli
Samim	Yosi Mizrahi
Ralf	Kaan Turgut
Saygın	İbrahim Kantarcılar

== Representation in other countries ==
Country	Channel	Premiere	Title
Bulgaria	bTV bTV Lady	July 25, 2011; March 4, 2013	Малки тайни
Serbia	RTV Pink; Pink Soap	March 28, 2012; 2013	Male tajne
Ukraine	ТЕТ	August 19, 2013	Маленькі таємниці

== Awards ==
Year	Awards	Category	Work	Result
2010	Ayaklı Gazete TV Star	Best Teen TV Series	Little Secrets	Won
2010	Ayaklı Gazete TV Star	Best Young Actress	Merve Boluğur	Won
2011	Antalya Television Award	Best Teen TV Series	Little Secrets	Nominated
2011	Ayaklı Gazete TV Star	Best Teen TV Series	Little Secrets	Nominated
2011	Izmir University of Economics Spring Holiday	Best TV Series	Little Secrets	Won
