= Özgür Çevik =

Turkish actor and singer

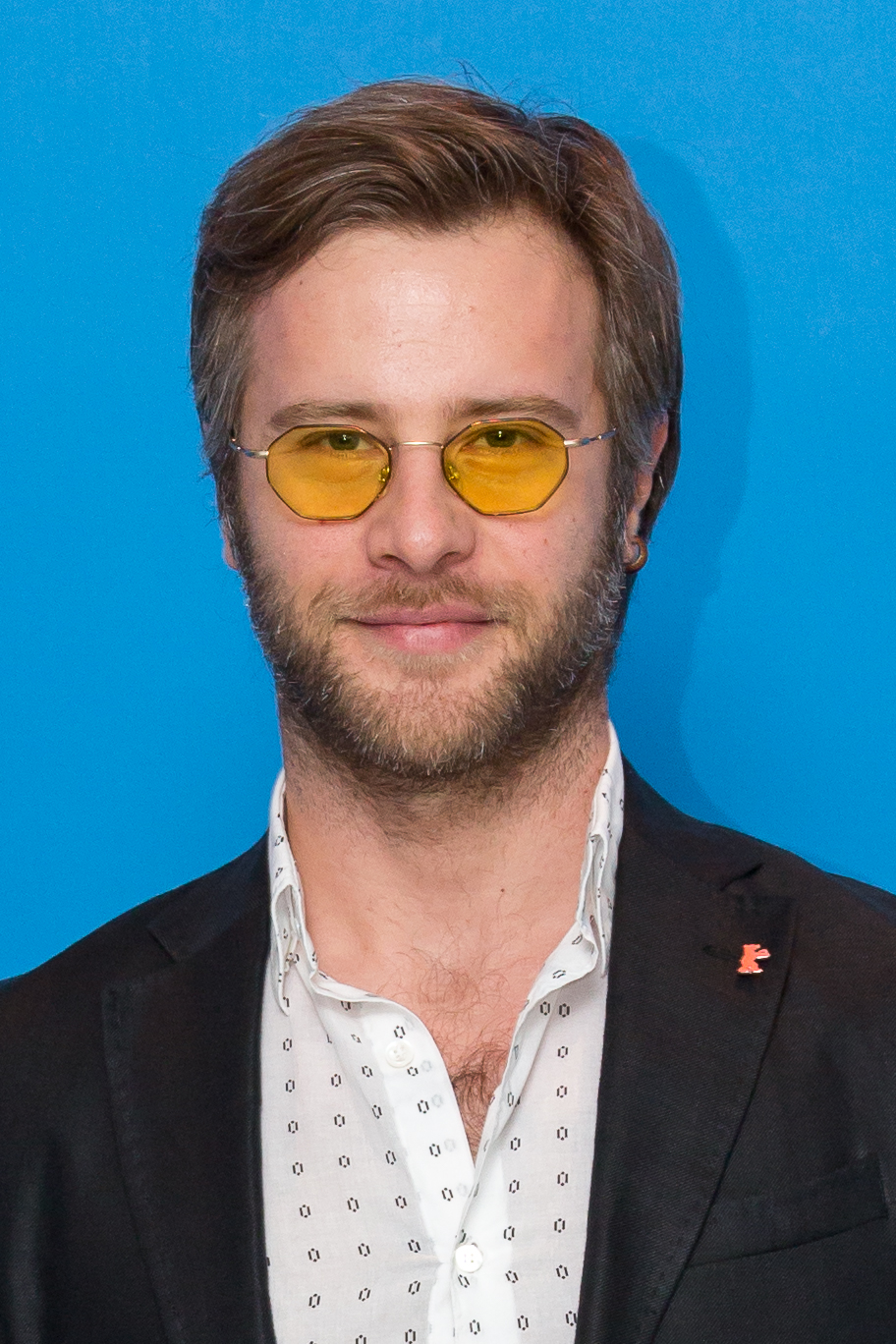
- Born: 27 May 1981 (age 44); Ankara, Turkey
- Occupations: Actor, singer
- Years active: 2004–present
- Spouse: Hatice Kartoğlu (m. 2024)
- Musical career
- Genres: Pop, rock
- Instruments: Vocals, guitar

Özgür Çevik (born 27 May 1981) is a Turkish actor and singer who gained fame and intense fan following as a result of having appeared in his country's version of the television pop music talent contest, Star Academy and, subsequently, as a variety performer and actor.

A native of Ankara, his father (Zeki) was a soldier and his mother (Nihal) was a police officer. He has one younger sister (Özge). Because of his father's job, Çevik's family moved a lot. They moved back to Istanbul after the 1999 Marmara earthquake.

He studied philosophy at Istanbul University and radio and television at Beykent University.

Özgür Çevik was cast as the lead in the popular TV series Yabancı Damat [The Foreign Groom], in which he starred as the Greek bridegroom Niko whose Turkish bride Nazlı was played by the actress Nehir Erdoğan. It is first Turkish series exported to Greece.

He released his first album Düş-ün-ce in 2008.

== Filmography ==
- Yabancı Damat - Niko Angelopoulos (2004–2007)
- Küçük Kıyamet - guest appearance (2006)
- Kavak Yelleri - Himself - guest appearance (2008)
- Avrupa Yakası - Manav Özgür - guest appearance (2008)
- Gece Sesleri - Seyhan Akalın ğ(2008)
- Vali - Levent (2009)
- Balkan Düğünü - Ömer (2009–2010)
- Sensiz Yaşayamam - Serdar (2010)
- Mazi Kalbimde Yaradır - Ferit (2011)
- Leyla ile Mecnun - guest appearance (2012)
- Evlerden Biri - İskender (2012)
- Şubat - Ali Poyraz (2013)
- Ben de Özledim - (2013)
- Saklı Kalan - Onur Cevher (2013)
- İtirazım Var - Doktor Tolga (2014)
- Kiraz Mevsimi - Derin (guest appearance) (2014)
- Kırgın Çiçekler - Toprak (2015–2018)
- Kaygı (Inflame) - Mehmet (2017)
- Can Kırıkları - Kerem - (2018)
- Canevim - Taylan Tanbay - (2019)
- Yeşilçam - İzzet - (2021)
- Sen Ben Lenin - Deniz - (2021)
- İyilik - Koray - (2022)
- Kaçış - Robert - (2022)
- Alparslan: Büyük Selçuklu - Leon (2023)
- Kurulus Osman - Komutan Lucas - (2024)
- Ben Leman - Demir - (2025)

== Discography ==
=== Albums ===
- Düş-ün-ce (2008)
