= Kadir Doğulu =

Turkish actor (born 1982)

- Born: Abdulkadir Doğulu; 19 April 1982 (age 43); Mersin, Turkey
- Education: Istanbul Okan University
- Occupation: Actor
- Years active: 2010–present
- Spouse: Neslihan Atagül (m. 2016)
- Children: 1
- Relatives: Kemal Doğulu (brother)
- Website: kadirdogulu.com

Abdulkadir Doğulu (born 19 April 1982), better known as Kadir Doğulu, is a Turkish actor.

== Early life and career ==
Doğulu was born on 19 April 1982 in Mersin. He worked during his secondary and high school years in many places as a cook and operator. He moved to Istanbul in 2000 to study at Okan University. He met Hande Yener through his brother, Kemal Doğulu, who is Yener's stylist. Soon afterwards, he worked with Hande Yener for a while and appeared in her song's music video called "Romeo". Then he began to receive offers of acting.

He had a leading role as Ali (original Nate Archibald) in Küçük Sırlar, a Turkish remake of Gossip Girl. He has played in several successful series. After his first acting experience, Kadir Dogulu took part in youth TV series names Dirty Seven (Pis Yedili). After then, he became the main character in From Fatih to Harbiye (Fatih Harbiye) which is a Turkish drama adapted by famous Turkish novel of Peyami Safa with the same name. He is also well known for bringing to life Mehmet III Giray in 2015 historical drama series Muhtesem Ÿuzyil Kösem alongside actors Beren Saat and Ekin Koç. Another successful TV series he made a starring role are Bana Sevmeyi Anlat (2016 - 2017), Babamin Günahlari (2018),Vuslat (2019-2020), and Aşkin Tarifi (2021).

== Personal life ==
Doğulu married actress Neslihan Atagül on 8 July 2016. The couple had met on the set of Fatih Harbiye in 2013. They welcomed a son in 2025.

== Filmography ==
Cinema
Year	Title	Role	Notes
2013	Bir Hikayem Var	Mert	Leading role

Television
Year	Title	Role	Notes
2010–2011	Küçük Sırlar	Ali Erarslan	Leading role
2011–2013	Pis Yedili	Güney Samyeli (Bayrampaşalı)	Leading role
2013–2014	Fatih Harbiye	Macit Arcaoğlu	Leading role
2015	Sevdam Alabora	Gökhan	Leading role
2015–2016	Muhteşem Yüzyıl Kösem	Mehmed III Giray	Recurring role
2016–2017	Bana Sevmeyi Anlat	Alper Eren	Leading role
2018	Babamın Günahları	Ozan Dikmen	Leading role
2019–2020	Vuslat	Aziz Korkmazer	Leading role
2020	Jet Sosyete	Kenan	Guest appearance
2021	Aşkın Tarifi	Fırat Karasu	Leading role
2021	Kazakh Business in Turkey		Guest appearance
2022-2023	Gecenin Ucunda	Kazım Işık	Leading role
