= Naz Çağla Irmak =

Turkish actress (born 1997)

- Born: 19 October 1997 (age 28); Ankara, Turkey
- Education: Pera Fine Arts High School
- Occupation: Actress
- Years active: 2002, 2015–present
- Television: Kırgın Çiçekler
- Mother: Hülya Gülşen

Naz Çağla Irmak (born 19 October 1997) is a Turkish actress best known for her role as Kader Kutay Lokumucuzade in the drama series Kırgın Çiçekler (2015–2018).

== Biography ==
Irmak is the daughter of actress Hülya Gülşen. She first appeared in front of the camera with her mother in the TV series Bizim Evin Halleri. She made her cinematic debut with Çakallarla Dans 5, which was released in 2019. Her most recent role on stage was in an adaptation of Fyodor Dostoevsky's play "Westend - End of the West".

Çağla Irmak is set to portray Neslican Tay, an activist who died due to cancer, in the movie Demir Kadın Neslican.

== Filmography ==
=== Television ===
Television
Year	Title	Role	Notes
2002	Bizim Evin Halleri	Anatolia	Supporting role
2015–2018	Kırgın Çiçekler	Kader	Leading role
2020–2021	Tövbeler Olsun	Aylin Necipli	Supporting role
2022	Hakim	Ceren	Supporting role
2022–2023	Sıfırıncı Gün	Bilge	Supporting role
2023	Hudutsuz Sevda	Edanur Karaçamlı	Supporting role
2025-	Taşacak Bu Deniz	Feride Cengiz	Supporting role

=== Film ===
Film
Year	Title	Role	Notes
2019	Çakallarla Dans 5	Leyla	Leading role
2023	Sen Inandir	Ahu	Supporting role
2023	Demir Kadın: Neslican	Neslican Tay	Leading role

=== Streaming platforms ===
Streaming platforms
Year	Title	Role	Notes
2021	N Kuşağı		Leading role
