= Başak Parlak =

Turkish actress

- Born: 3 November 1989 (age 35); Tekirdağ, Turkey
- Education: Namık Kemal High School; Maltepe University
- Occupation(s): Actress, model

Başak Parlak (born 3 November 1989) is a Turkish actress and model.

After Ottoman Empire collapsed, her maternal family is of Turkish descent who immigrated from Greece. Her paternal family is of Turkish descent who immigrated from Bulgaria.

After he was cast in popular series such as Doktorlar, Emret Komutanım, Acı Hayat, Papatyam. The breakthrough in her career came in 2007 with a role in the TV series Fikrimin İnce Gülü based from novel.

She had leading role in period series Yamak Ahmet. In 2013, she had a leading role in the movie Şevkat Yerimdar and reprised the role in its 2016 sequel Şevkat Yerimdar 2: Bizde Sakat Çok.

In 2017, she portrayed the character of Seda in the TV series Kış Güneşi, which lasted for 18 episodes. Between 2017 and 2018, she appeared in the TV series Şevkat Yerimdar, an adaptation of the movie with the same name.

== Filmography ==
=== Film ===
| 'Year | Title | Role | Notes |
|---|---|---|---|
| 2006 | Geceler Yarim Oldu | Emine | Leading role |
| 2006 | Memleket Hikayeleri - Arda Boyları | Zeynep | Leading role |
| 2006 | Memleket Hikayeleri: Evlerinin Önü Mersin | Sırma | Leading role |
| 2009 | Süpürr! | Naz | Leading role |
| 2010 | Mahpeyker Kösem Sultan | Turhan Sultan | Supporting role |
| 2013 | Neva | Neva | Leading role |
| 2013 | Şevkat Yerimdar | Pelin | Leading role |
| 2014 | Bana Adını Sor | Merve | Leading role |
| 2016 | Şevkat Yerimdar 2: Bizde Sakat Çok | Pelin | Leading role |
| 2018 | Bebek Geliyorum Demez | Beste | Leading role |

=== TV series ===
| Year | Title | Role | Notes |
|---|---|---|---|
| 2003 | Zalim | - | Supporting role |
| 2004 | Ayışığı Neredesin | - | Supporting role |
| 2004 | Büyük Buluşma | - | Guest appearance |
| 2005 | Beşinci Boyut | Yeşim | Guest appearance |
| 2005 | Acı Hayat | Hizmetçi Gizem | Supporting role |
| 2005 | Emret Komutanım | Jennifer | Supporting role |
| 2006–2008 | Doktorlar | İrem | Supporting role |
| 2007 | Fikrimin İnce Gülü | Gülendam | Supporting role |
| 2008 | Serçe | Mine Aslan / Serçe | Leading role |
| 2009 | Uygun Adım Aşk | Gülşah | Supporting role |
| 2010–2011 | Papatyam | Sıla | Supporting role |
| 2011 | Sırat | Ceren Çandar | Supporting role |
| 2011–2012 | Yamak Ahmet | Dilruba | Leading role |
| 2013–2014 | Fatih Harbiye | Rüya | Supporting role |
| 2014 | Sevdam Alabora | Banu | Leading role |
| 2014 | Bugünün Saraylısı | Ece | Guest appearance |
| 2015 | Bir Deniz Hikayesi | Reyhan | Leading role |
| 2016 | Kış Güneşi | Seda | Leading role |
| 2017–2018 | Şevkat Yerimdar | Esin Uçar | Leading role |
| 2021–2022 | Kanunsuz Topraklar | Bahar | Leading role |
