= Hazar Motan =

Turkish actress (born 1990)

- Born: 13 December 1990 (age 35); Ankara, Turkey
- Education: Bilkent Üniversitesi Güzel Sanatlar Tasarım Ve Mimarlık Fakültesi
- Occupations: Actress; painter; model
- Years active: 1997–present
- Television: Kırgın Çiçekler (2015–2018)

Hazar Motan (born 13 December 1990) is a Turkish actress, model and painter. She is known for her role as Cemre in drama series Kırgın Çiçekler, Hande Tekin in Can Kırıkları and Findik Hatçe in Kanunsuz Topraklar.

== Life ==
She studied at Bilkent University, School of Fine Arts. She started her career in 1997 as a child actress with a role in the movie Yanlış Saksının Çiçeği. In 2004, she was cast in the short movie Damatlık Şapka, portraying the character of Güllü. In 2014, she joined the cast of Diğer Yarım. Her breakthrough came in 2015, with a leading role in the teen drama Kırgın Çiçekler as Cemre.

== Filmography ==
Film
Year	Title	Role	Notes
1997	Yanlış Saksının Çiçeği		Supporting role
2004	Damatlık Şapka	Güllü	Leading role (short film)
Television
Year	Title	Role	Notes
2000	Bizim Evin Halleri		Supporting role
2009	Hesaplaşma		Supporting role
2014	Paşa Gönlüm	Elvan	Supporting role
2014	Diğer Yarım	Esin	Supporting role
2015–2018	Kırgın Çiçekler	Cemre Derinoğlu	Leading role
2018	Can Kırıkları	Hande Tekin	Supporting role
2021–2022	Kanunsuz Topraklar	Findik Hatçe	Supporting role
2023	Veda Mektubu	Beste	Supporting role
