= İpek Karapınar =

Turkish actress

- Born: Funda İpek Karapınar Yılmaz; 20 March 1984 (age 41); Istanbul, Turkey
- Occupation: Actress
- Years active: 2007–present
- Spouse: Ali Balcı (m. 2025)

Funda İpek Karapınar Yılmaz (born 20 March 1984) is a Turkish actress and violist.

İpek Karapınar studied at violin department of Mimar Sinan Fine Arts University Conservatory. She made her television debut with a role in the hit period series Hatırla Sevgili. After appearing in a recurring role in hit crime series Kurtlar Vadisi Pusu. She had her breakthrough with re-written Blair/Arzu role in the teen drama Küçük Sırlar which Turkish of Gossip girl. Between 2015 and 2018, she had a leading role in Kırgın Çiçekler TV series. She played in period series "Ustura Kemal", "Destan", "Köprü".

== Filmography ==
=== Television ===
Title	Role	Year
Hatırla Sevgili	Emine	2006
Kurtlar Vadisi Pusu	Funda ilmen	
Zehirli Sarmaşık	Sinem	2011
Doludizgin Yıllar	Gülşen	
Köprü	Aslı Yazıcı	2006-2008
Küçük Sırlar	Arzu	
Ustura Kemal	Nihal	2012
Talih Kuşu	Cansu	
Adını Kalbime Yazdım	Leyla	2013
Hayat Yolunda	Yelda Güçlü	2014-2015
Kırgın Çiçekler	Feride	2015-2018
Nöbet	Zeynep	2019
Destan	Çolpan Hatun	2021-2022
Kuruluş Osman	Frigg	2022–
