= Volkan Akyıldız =

Austrian footballer (born 1995)

Personal information
- Date of birth: 23 February 1995 (age 31)
- Place of birth: Hohenems, Austria
- Position: Forward

Team information
- Current team: SC Hatlerdorf
- Number: 20

Youth career
- 2003–2009: FC Götzis
- 2009–2010: Schaan
- 2010–2012: Vaduz
- 2012–2013: St. Gallen
- 2013–2014: Vaduz

Senior career*
Years	Team	Apps	(Gls)
2014	Faroz Yalıspor		
2014–2015	Ofspor	2	(0)
2015–2016	FC Au-Berneck 05	23	(37)
2016–2017	VfB Hohenems	11	(8)
2017–2018	Rheindorf Altach	1	(0)
2017–2018	Rheindorf Altach II	22	(33)
2018–2019	SK Austria Klagenfurt	11	(0)
2018–2019	SC Wiener Neustadt	5	(0)
2019–2020	Nazilli Belediyespor	12	(5)
2019–2020	Çorum	6	(1)
2020–2021	Orduspor	9	(1)
2021	Pinzgau Saalfelden	4	(0)
2021	TSV Berg	2	(0)
2022	Schwarz-Weiß Bregenz	8	(0)
2022–2023	FC Alberschwende	22	(16)
2023–	SC Hatlerdorf	11	(14)
- * Club domestic league appearances and goals

Volkan Akyıldız (born 23 February 1995) is an Austrian footballer who plays as a forward for Landesliga Vorarlberg club SC Hatlerdorf.

== Career ==
At the end of 2014–15, Akyildiz left Turkey so he would not have to serve in the Turkish military, eventually paying money to avoid conscription.

For 2015–16, he signed for Au-Berneck in the Swiss sixth division where he scored 37 goals in 23 appearances, including six in one game.

In 2017, Akyildiz signed for Austrian Bundesliga club SC Rheindorf Altach, scoring 33 goals in 22 league appearances for their reserves in the third division. However, he failed to establish himself in the first team and left for the Turkish fourth division after two spells in the Austrian second league.

In 2020, Akyildiz said that European teams emphasize discipline whereas Turkish teams rely on physical strength.
