= Gökçe Akyıldız =

Turkish actress (born 1992)

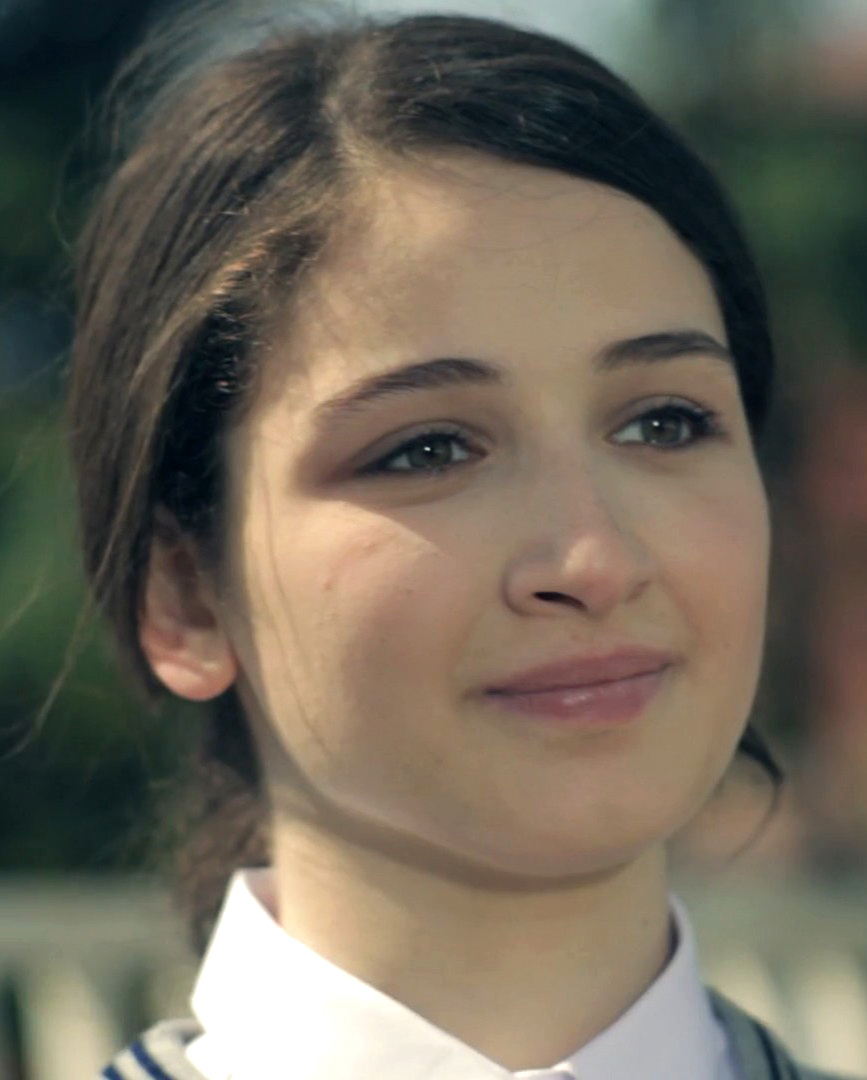
- Akyıldız in 2013
- Born: 30 October 1992 (age 33); Sinop, Turkey
- Occupation: Actress
- Years active: 2002–present
- Television: Kırgın Çiçekler (2015–2018); Fatih Harbiye (2013–2014); Medcezir (2013–2015)
- Spouse: Mustafa Özyurt (m. 2017; div. 2020)
- Children: 1

Gökçe Akyıldız (born 30 October 1992) is a Turkish actress. She appeared in different films and television series as well as Zozan Fırat in Hayat Devam Ediyor, Aslı in Fatih Harbiye and Songül in Kırgın Çiçekler.

== Biography ==
Akyıldız was born on 30 October 1992 in Sinop, the third of four children. She has a twin sister, Gözde Akyıldız, who is a former child actress. She showed her interest in acting from an early age of five years old and in 2002 made her cinematic debut in Bir Tutam Baharat as Saime.

She later got role in a number of STV series, including Sırlar Dünyası, Büyük Buluşma and Beşinci Boyut. In 2005, she appeared with a different role in Zeynep with her sister. In 2006, she portrayed the character of Tekgül in Ezo Gelin.

She continued her career with roles in such as crime series Parmaklıklar Ardında, Gazi and Kollama. She was cast in series "Sahra" which written and played by Berkun Oya. Her breakthrough came in 2011 with her appearance in Hayat Devam Ediyor, and following that she got roles in the series Bizim Okul.

She portrayed in Kötü Yol and the character of Aslı in Fatih Harbiye, both based on classic novels. The series ended in 2014.

She later appeared as Songül on ATV series Kırgın Çiçekler, which ended on 12 March 2018. She is playing as Sofya in Kudus Fatihi Selahuddin Eyyubi She also played in a number of commercials for Lipton.

== Filmography ==
Movies
Year	Title	Role	Notes
2003	A Touch of Spice	Saime	Leading role
2009	Konak	Selma	Supporting role
Television
Year	Title	Role	Notes
2003	Büyümüş de Küçülmüş	Gizem	Supporting role
2003	Çınaraltı	Gökçe	Supporting role
2004–2006	Büyük Buluşma	Selcan	Leading role
2004	Sahra	Lara	Leading role
2005	Zeynep	Tülin	Leading role
2005	Beşinci Boyut	Başak	Leading role
2006	Ezo Gelin	Tekgül	Supporting role
2007	Parmaklıklar Ardında	Birsen Mutlu	Supporting role
2008	Gazi	Berçem	Leading role
2008–2010	Kollama	Nurbanu Yılmaz	Supporting role
2011–2012	Hayat Devam Ediyor	Zozan Fırat	Supporting role
2012	Kötü Yol	Canan	Leading role
2013	Bizim Okul	Gülbahar	Supporting role
2013–2014	Fatih Harbiye	Aslı	Supporting role
2015–2018	Kırgın Çiçekler	Songül Celen	Leading role
2021–2022	Elkızı	Songül Turan	Supporting role
2022	Seni Kalbime Sakladım	Deren Tokgöz	Leading role
2023-2024	Kudüs Fatihi Selahaddin Eyyubi	Sofia	Supporting role
Commercials
Year	Company	Ref	Notes
2016	Lipton		Advertising face
