= Birkan Sokullu =

Turkish actor

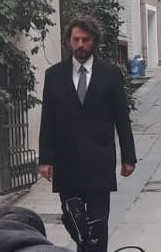
- Sokullu in 2020
- Born: 6 October 1985 (age 40); Istanbul, Turkey
- Occupation: Actor
- Years active: 2008–present
- Spouse: Aslı Enver (m. 2012; div. 2015)

Birkan Sokullu (born 6 October 1985) is a Turkish actor.

== Life and career ==
Birkan Sokullu was born in Istanbul on 6 October 1985. Sokullu is of Bosnian origins. He left his basketball career after 10 years due to his leg injury. He graduated from Maltepe University with a specialty in Radio TV Programming. While studying at university, he began his modelling career. He took acting lessons from Dolunay Soysert. He also studied in Drama and Acting Department of İstanbul Aydın University for one year but he dropped out.

Sokullu started to get noticed after he joined the cast of popular series including Küçük Kadınlar, Melekler Korusun, and Uçurum. His first popular leading role is Demir in Küçük Sırlar, the Turkish remake of Gossip Girl. His gained fame with hit series Hayat Şarkısı and Masumlar Apartmanı. He has also appeared in a number of historical drama series such as Kurt Seyit ve Şura, Rise of Empires: Ottoman, Ya İstiklal Ya Ölüm, Bir Aile Hikayesi, and Fatih. In 2018, Sokullu starred in the fictional series Yaşamayanlar with Kerem Bürsin and Elçin Sangu. He also had a leading role in the 2019 horror film Güzelliğin Portresi.

== Filmography ==
TV Series
Year	Title	Role	Channel	Notes
2008	Elif	Mustafa	ATV	Supporting role
2008	Küçük Kadınlar	Ayaz	Kanal D	Joined
2009–2010	Melekler Korusun	Levent	Show TV	Joined
2010–2011	Küçük Sırlar	Demir	Kanal D – Star TV	Leading role
2012	Uçurum	Ulaş	ATV	Joined
2013	Fatih	Şehzade Mustafa	Kanal D	Supporting role
2014	Kurt Seyit ve Şura	Petro Borinsky	Star TV	Leading role
2016–2017	Hayat Şarkısı	Kerim Cevher	Kanal D	Leading role
2017	Yüz Yüze	Cihangir	Show TV	Leading role
2019	Bir Aile Hikayesi	Berk Güneş	Fox	Leading role
2020–2022	Masumlar Apartmanı	Han Derenoğlu	TRT 1	Leading role
2022	Kırmızı Oda	Han Derenoğlu	TV8	Guest appearance
2023	Yüz Yıllık Mucize	Kemal/Ali Tahir/Eşref	Star TV	Leading role

Web Series
Year	Project	Role	Platform	Notes
2018	Yaşamayanlar	Numel	BluTV	Leading role
2020	Rise of Empires: Ottoman	Giovanni Giustiniani	Netflix	docudrama/ Leading role
2020	Ya İstiklal Ya Ölüm	Topkapılı Cambaz Mehmet Bey	Tabii /TRT 1	mini series/ Leading role
2024	Zamanın Kapıları	Sinan	TOD	Leading role

Films
Year	Film	Role	Notes
2019	Kronoloji	Hakan	Leading role
2019	Güzelliğin Portresi	Özgür	Leading role
2024	Romantik Hırsız	Güney	Leading role
