= İlay Erkök =

Turkish actress (born 1993)

- Born: 4 October 1993 (age 32); Istanbul, Turkey
- Occupation: Actress
- Years active: 2013–present

İlay Erkök (born 4 October 1993) is a Turkish actress.

== Early life and education ==
İlay Erkök was born in Istanbul, though she is originally from Manisa. She has a brother Koray Erkök. She graduated from Istanbul University State Conservatory . She acquired her acting education from Royal Conservatoire of Scotland in Glasgow, Scotland.

== Career ==
Erkök started her acting career in 2013, she starred in the series Güneşi Beklerken and portrayed the character of Young Demet, the show starred Kerem Bürsin and Hande Doğandemir. In 2015, she starred in the series İnadına Aşk and portrayed the character of Damla, it was broadcast on FOX, it starred Can Yaman and Açelya Topaloğlu. In 2016, she made her debut in the series Hayatımın Aşkı and portrayed the character of Sezen, the same year she starred in the television film Çetin Ceviz 2 and portrayed the character of Ayşen.

In 2017, she made her cinematic debut with the movie Seni Gidi Seni and depicted the character of Elif. In 2018 she made her debut in the series Darısı Başımıza and portrayed the character of Nur. In 2019, she starred in the series Hercai and depicted the character of Yaren Şadoğlu, it starred Akın Akınözü, Ebru Şahin and Oya Unustası, the show is still airing as of 2021.

== Personal life ==
Erkök dated Turkish actor and singer Keremcem, who was fifteen years her senior, however they later broke up. In 2020, she started dating basketball player Kerem Gülmez.

== Filmography ==
Films
Year	Title	Role
2016	Çetin Ceviz 2	Ayşen
2017	Seni Gidi Seni	Elif
2017	İlk Öpücük	Çağla
Television
2013–2014	Güneşi Beklerken	Young Demet
2015–2016	İnadına Aşk	Damla Başar
2016	Hayatımın Aşkı	Sezen
2018	Darısı Başımıza	Nur
2019–2021	Hercai	Yaren Şadoğlu
