= Tansu (name) =

Tansu is a unisex Turkish given name. Notable people with the name include:

== Male ==
- Tansu Biçer (born 1978), Turkish actor
- Tansu Okandan (1942–2019), Turkish diplomat
- Ahmet Tansu Taşanlar (born 1984), Turkish actor

== Female ==
- Tansu Çiller (born 1946), Turkish academic, economist, and politician
