= Yalı Çapkını =

Turkish TV show

- Genre: Romantic drama
- Created by: Gülseren Budayıcıoğlu
- Written by: Mehmet Barış Günger
- Directed by: Burcu Alptekin; Alptekin Bozkurt
- Starring: Afra Saraçoğlu; Mert Ramazan Demir; Çetin Tekindor; Gülçin Santırcıoğlu; Şerif Sezer
- Music by: Güldiyar Tanrıdağlı
- Country of origin: Turkey
- Original language: Turkish
- No. of seasons: 3
- No. of episodes: 101

Production
- Production locations: Istanbul; Gaziantep
- Running time: In Turkey: 120 minutes Elsewhere: 45 minutes
- Production company: OGM Pictures

Original release
- Network: Star TV
- Release: 23 September 2022 – 4 April 2025

Yalı çapkını (English: The Golden Boy, also called Kingfisher) is a Turkish romance drama television series based on story created by Gülseren Budayıcıoğlu. The series revolves around a forced marriage with plenty of intrigue, lies, deception and dark family secrets.

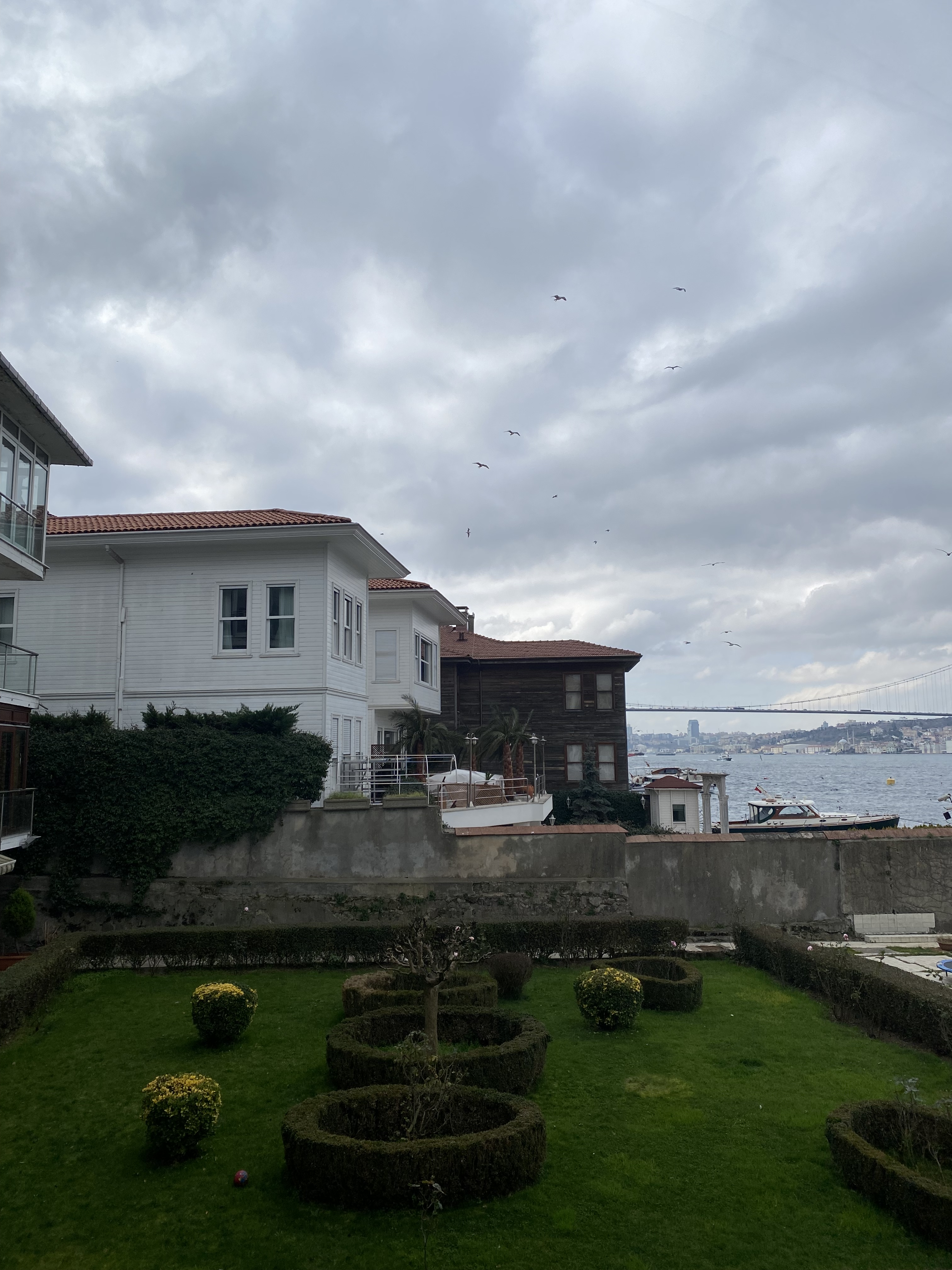
One of the filming locations of the series

== Plot ==
Ferit Korhan is a spoiled heir of the rich Korhan family in Istanbul. He spends his daily life having endless parties and new conquests.

Ferit's behavior upsets his grandfather Halis Korhan who is the owner of a large jewellery empire and the head of the Korhan family. He decides to marry Ferit to a suitable girl from his hometown, Gaziantep, and the task of finding the bride is given to Ifakat, Halis' eldest daughter in law, who is also widowed. Although Ferit does not want to get married, he cannot go against his grandfather's words. İfakat originally picked Suna, the older daughter of the Şanlı family when she had eyes on Suna's younger sister, Seyran.

On the night of the proposal, after an unfortunate clumsy accident, Ferit chooses Seyran as his bride shocking Suna, causing Suna to resent Seyran. Kazim accepts the proposal and thus Ferit and Seyran get married. The season's scandal started as Ferit introduces Seyran to his girlfriend, Pelin, on the night of their wedding.

== Cast ==
=== Main ===
- Afra Saraçoğlu as Seyran Şanlı
  - Arya Hira Kiliç as young Seyran

Hattuç's grand-niece, Kazım and Esme's daughter, Suna's younger sister, Ferit's wife

- Mert Ramazan Demir as Ferit Korhan
  - Adel Guler as young Ferit

Halis's grandson, Orhan and Gülgün's son, Fuat's younger brother, Seyran's husband

=== Supporting ===
==== Korhan family ====
- Çetin Tekindor as Halıs aga
  - Barış Akdeniz as young Halis

Emin, Orhan and Nükhet's father, Fuat and Ferit's paternal grandfather and Kaya's maternal grandfather, Hattuç's ex lover turned husband, Abidin's paternal uncle

- Gülçin Santırcıoğlu as İfakat Korhan

Emin's widow

- Emre Altuğ as Orhan Korhan

Halis's son, Gulgün's husband, Fuat and Ferit's father,

- Gözde Kansu as Gülgün Korhan

Orhan's wife, Fuat and Ferit's mother

- Ersin Arıcı as Abidin

Ferit's best friend and ex-driver, Aysen's ex-fiance, Suna's ex-lover turned third husband. Later revealed to be Halis's paternal nephew and Sevki's maternal nephew (2022-present)

- Doğukan Polat as Fuat Korhan
  - Baran Sengül as young Fuat

Halis's grandson, Orhan and Gülgün' son, Ferit's elder brother, Asuman's husband

- Öznur Serçeler as Asuman Korhan

Fuat's wife

- Binnur Kaya as Nükhet Korhan

Halis's daughter, Kaya's mother, Sehmuz's third wife

- Taro Emir Tekin as Kaya Sönmez

Halıs grandson, Nükhet's son, Suna's second husband

- Akın Akınözü as Cihan Korhan

Halıs oldest son, Orhan's older brother, İfakats deceased husband

==== Şanlı family ====
- Şerif Sezer as Hatice 'Hattuç' Şanlı
  - Mehtap Demirel as young Hattuç

Kazim's paternal aunt, Seyran and Suna's grand-aunt, Halis's ex-lover turned second wife (2022-present)

- Beril Pozam as Suna Şanlı
  - Bade Tokel as young Suna

Hattuç's grand-niece, Kazim and Esme's daughter, Seyran's older sister, Saffet and Kaya's ex-wife, Abidin's ex-lover turned wife

- Diren Polatoğulları as Kazım Şanlı

Hattuc's nephew, Esme's husband, Seyran and Suna's father

- Sezin Bozacı as Esme Şanlı

Kazim's wife, Seyran and Suna's mother

==== Korhan family's servants ====
- Hülya Duyar as Şefika

Cook, Aysen's mother

- Yiğit Tuncay as Latif

Halis's right hand man and real designer of Korhan Jewellers

- Muhammad Mustafa as Carlos
- İrem Altuğ as Sultan

Maid, İbrahim's wife, Dicle and Firat's mother, İfakat's spy

- Selen Özbayrak as Dicle

Maid, İbrahim and Sultan's daughter

- Senol Sahin as Mustafa
- Umut Gezer as Yusuf

Driver, Seyran's ex-boyfriend

- Cansu Firinci as İbrahim

Driver, Sultan's husband, Dicle and Firat's father

- Gülen Gedikoglu as Aysen

Maid, Şefika's daughter, Abidin's ex-fiance

- Selin Beliz Sahan as Sevda

=== Others ===
| Character | Description | Actor | Season |
|---|---|---|---|
| Pelin Yılmaz | Zerrin's daughter, Ferit's ex-girlfriend | Buçe Buse Kahraman | 1-2 |
| Zerrin Yılmaz | Pelin's mother, Sehmuz's sister | Toprak Sağlam | 1-2 |
| Pırıl | Perin's cousin, Sehmuz's daughter | Büşra Alnıtemiz | 2 |
| Sehmuz | Pelin's uncle, Zerrin's brother, Piril's father, later marries Nükhet, Father of Ifakat's unborn child | Turgut Tunçalp | 2 |

==== İhsanlı family ====
| Character | Description | Actor | Season |
|---|---|---|---|
| Tarık İhsanlı | Seyran's one sided lover and Ferit’s rival | Baran Bölükbaşı | 1-2-3 |
| Saffet İhsanlı | Tarik's brother, Suna's first husband | Ediz Akşehir | 1-2-3 |
| Saffet Aga İhsanlı | Saffet and Tarik's grandfather | Muhammed Cangören | 1 |
| Nazan İhsanlı | Saffet and Tarik's mother | Bilge Can Göker | 1 |

==== Reis family ====
| Character | Description | Actor | Season |
|---|---|---|---|
| Diyar | Ferit's ex-fiance | Pelin Akil | 3 |
| Binnaz | Diyar's grandmother | Mine Teber | 3 |
| Ilyaz Reis | Diyar's grandfather | Alper Türedi | 3 |

==== Others ====
| Character | Description | Actor | Season |
|---|---|---|---|
| Burak | Pelin's cousin, Ferit and Serter's friend | Can Jean Korkmaz | 1 |
| Taylan Güler | Journalist, Ferit's enemy | Yigit Ardel | 1-2 |
| Serter Özer | Pelin's friend turned harasser, father of her unborn child | Tufan Gökpınar | 1-2 |
| Cemil | Sehmuz's right hand man | Mustafa Taskin | 2 |
| Ece | Seyran's friend | Nila Yari | 2 |
| Ökkes | Kazim's friend, Halis's rival (dead) | Murat Baykan | 2 |
| Akin | Tayyar and Mezide's son, Ökkes's nephew (dead) | Melih Ozkaya | 2 |
| Mezide | Ökkes's sister, Akin's mother, Hattuc's rival | Ilkay Kayku Atalay | 2 |
| Tayyar | Akin's father | Nazmi Kirik | 2 |
| Serpil | Ifakat's niece | Türkü Su Demirel | 2-3 |
| Betül | Orhan's secretary | Hazal Araci | 1, 3 |
| Nurten | Betül's mother | Aysen Sezerel | 3 |
| Memo | Ferit's helper at workshop | Osman Çakir | 3 |
| Sinan Kantarci | Seyran's former second husband | Cem Söküt | 3 |
| Ayla Kantarci | Sinan's mother | Derya Alabora | 3 |
| Osman | Sinan's driver and right hand man | Levent Keskin | 3 |
| Melek Korhan | Orhan's and Gülgün's daughter, Fatma's daughter | Merve Boluğur | 3 |
| Cihan Korhan | İfakat's brother | Akın Akınözü | 3 |
| Zeynep Korhan | İfakat's daughter | Ebru Şahin | 3 |
| Fatma Korhan | Melek's mother, Halis's daughter | Nurgül Yeşilçay | 3 |

== Episodes ==
| Season | Episodes | Originally released | |
| Season | Episodes | First released | Last released |
|---|---|---|---|
| 1 | 36 | September 23, 2022 | June 9, 2023 |
| 2 | 37 | September 15, 2023 | June 7, 2024 |
| 3 | 28 | September 13, 2024 | April 4, 2025 |

== Awards ==
| Year | Award | Category | Result | Winner / Nominee |
|---|---|---|---|---|
| 2024 | Pantene Golden Butterfly Awards | Best TV Series | Nominee | Yalı Çapkını (The Golden Boy) |
| 2024 | Pantene Golden Butterfly Awards | Best Actress | Nominee | Afra Saraçoğlu |
| 2024 | Pantene Golden Butterfly Awards | Best Actor | Nominee | Mert Ramazan Demir |
| 2023 | Pantene Golden Butterfly Awards | Best TV Series | Winner | Yalı Çapkını (The Golden Boy) |
| 2023 | Pantene Golden Butterfly Awards | Best Actress | Nominee | Afra Saraçoğlu |
| 2023 | Pantene Golden Butterfly Awards | Best Actor | Nominee | Mert Ramazan Demir |
| 2023 | Pantene Golden Butterfly Awards | Best TV Couple | Nominee | Afra Saraçoğlu & Mert Ramazan Demir |
| 2023 | Pantene Golden Butterfly Awards | Best Director | Nominee | Burcu Alptekin |
| 2023 | Pantene Golden Butterfly Awards | Best Screenplay | Nominee | Mehmet Baris Günger |
| 2023 | Turkey Youth Awards | Best TV Actor | Nominee | Mert Ramazan Demir |
| 2023 | Turkey Youth Awards | Best TV Actress | Winner | Afra Saraçoğlu |
| 2023 | Turkey Youth Awards | Best Supporting TV Actor | Nominee | Dogukan Polat |
| 2023 | Turkey Youth Awards | Best Supporting TV Actor | Winner | Ersin Arici |
| 2023 | Turkey Youth Awards | Best Supporting TV Actress | Nominee | Beril Pozam |
| 2023 | Turkey Youth Awards | Best Supporting TV Actress | Nominee | Buçe Buse Kahraman |
| 2023 | Turkey Youth Awards | Best Supporting TV Actress | Nominee | Öznur Serçeler |
| 2023 | Turkey Youth Awards | Best TV Couple | Nominee | Afra Saraçoğlu & Mert Ramazan Demir |
| 2023 | Turkey Youth Awards | Best TV Series | Winner | Yalı Çapkını (The Golden Boy) |
| 2023 | PRODU Awards | Best Foreign Telenovela | Winner | Yalı Çapkını (The Golden Boy) |
| 2023 | PRODU Awards | Best Actor in a Foreign Series | Winner | Mert Ramazan Demir |
| 2024 | Venice TV Award | Best Soap / Telenovela | Nominee | Yalı Çapkını (The Golden Boy), Season 2 |
| 2023 | Ayaklı Gazete TV Stars Awards | Best Actress (TV Series) | Winner | Afra Saraçoğlu |

Total: 7 wins and 15 nominations.
