= Mert Ramazan Demir =

Turkish actor (born 1998)

- Istanbul, 2026.
- Born: 28 January 1998 (age 28); Şile, Istanbul, Turkey
- Occupation: Actor
- Years active: 2016–present

Mert Ramazan Demir (born January 28, 1998) is a Turkish actor. He rose to worldwide prominence with his role as Ferit Korhan in the TV series Yalı Çapkını. Demir also starred as Ateş in the 2020 Turkish TV series Öğretmen (The Teacher), Ese in the NETFLIX movie UFO (2022), and Cihan in the first season of the highly acclaimed NETFLIX series Şahmaran, filmed in the summer of 2022 and premiered in 2023. Later he acted in the second season of this digital project.

== Life and career ==
Mert Ramazan Demir was born on January 28, 1998 in Şile, Istanbul, as the youngest of five brothers and he also has a younger sister. His family is originally from Erciş, Van. His father is a businessman while his mother is a homemaker. In early childhood and during his high school years, Mert Ramazan Demir dedicated a lot of effort and time to sports as he was professionally involved in soccer and basketball. The actor has stated he was interested in acting since his childhood, but he grew seriously passionate about it later on. He studied acting at the Dialogue Speech Communication Academy (Dialog Anlatım İletişim) and Michelle Danner Acting Studio and first began performing in his school theatre. Following years he attended the Beykent University Conservatory, where he mastered camera acting under the guidance of Ali Bilgin and Semih Bagci.

Demir had his first leading role in a movie in 2019, when he starred in I Am You, directed by Sonia Nassery Cole. For this role he learned Dari(Afgan language). Here he shared the leading role with Damla Sönmez, Cansu Tosun and Emre Çetinkaya. After appearing in a number of supporting roles in television productions and having performed main characters in various digital projects, he was cast in a leading role in the romantic drama Yalı Çapkını (2022 – 2025).

His following works, such as the NETFLIX movie Metruk Adam(Abandoned Man, 2025), and the project for Disney+ digital platform, Bize Bi'Sey Olmaz (We'll Be Fine, 2026), were remarkable success and both keep holding their leading positions in the charts. The TV show Delikanlı, internationally known as The Gentleman, where Demir starred as the main protagonist Yusuf, was not as long-lasting as predicted and anticipated, however, despite the fact production has completed on 7 episodes in total, the actor still managed to impress the audience with his authentic performance and the series, as well as Demir and his Yusuf, remain popular and talked about, dominate press headlines and Delikanlı is currently being sold to several countries.

Mert Ramazan Demir was cast as the main character in Susuz Yaz (Dry Summer), a new adaptation of the novella by Turkish writer Necati Cumalı. The project is inspired by Cumalı's literary work and its 1963 film adaptation.

Demir played in the Mixed Doubles Exhibition Match on the final day of the ENKA Open tournament in Istanbul on August 9, 2026

== Filmography ==
Television
Year	Title	Role	Network
2020	Öğretmen	Ateş Genç	FOX
2022–2025	Yalı Çapkını	Ferit Korhan	Star TV
2026–2026	Delikanlı	Yusuf Yilmaz	Show TV
Streaming series and movies
Year	Title	Role	Platform
2022	UFO	Ese	Netflix
2023–present	Şahmaran	Cihan	Netflix
2025	Metruk Adam	Baran	Netflix
2026	Bize Bir Şey Olmaz	Aktan	Disney+
Cinema
Year	Title	Role	
2019	I Am You	Ikram	

== Awards and nominations ==
Year	Award	Category	Work	Result
2023	PRODU Awards	Best Actor (Golden Boy)	Yalı Çapkını	Won
2023	49th Golden Butterfly Awards	Best TV Couple (with Afra Saraçoğlu)	Yalı Çapkını	Nominated
