= Yeşim Ceren Bozoğlu =

Turkish actress

- Born: 29 July 1974 (age 52); Ankara, Turkey
- Education: Dokuz Eylül University
- Occupation: Actress
- Spouse: Sinan Çalışkanoğlu (m. 2007; div. 2010)

Yeşim Ceren Bozoğlu (born 29 July 1974) is a Turkish actress, director, voice actress and educator.

== Biography ==
A graduate of Dokuz Eylül University with a degree in acting studies, Bozoğlu started her career as a stage actress. Upon graduating, she had her first role in the play Kadınlar and due to her performance, she was chosen by Cumhuriyet newspaper as the "Young Actress of the Year". She later joined the Turkish State Theatres and soon started a career in cinema and television.

As an actress, she worked with directors such as Semih Kaplanoğlu and Ömer Uğur. She was cast in hit series "Yeditepe İstanbul", "Gülbeyaz", "Sıcak Saatler". She had her breakthrough with her role in the hit medical "Doktorlar" as Fikret and in series the hit comedy series Geniş Aile as "Domuşuk Sevim". She played in sketches theatre "Güldür Güldür Show". She joined the cast of Canım Babam before appearing on TRT 1's youth series Elde Var Hayat series as "Zehra". Subsequently she starred in the 2010 movie Bahtıkara, which was awarded as the Best Film at the İpekyolu Film Festival.

Aside from her career as an actress, Bozoğlu taught Turkish and English courses at Duru Theatre. She also appeared in the music videos for Mirkelam's Asuman Pansuman and Rober Hatemo's Doludizgin songs. Together with Lale Mansur and Halit Ergenç, she starred in the movie Misafir. She has also written an autobiography on her acting experiences under the title Dersimiz Oyunculuk.

== Theatre ==
- Gözlerimi Kaparım Vazifemi Yaparım
- Örümcek Kadının Öpücüğü
- Tersine Dünya
- Sessizlik
- Arthuro Ui'nin Önlenebilir Yükselişi
- Totlar
- Oyun Nasıl Oynanmalı

== Filmography ==
- Yaz Şarkısı - 2023 - Neriman Hasamaç
- Gelsin Hayat Bildiği Gibi - 2023 - Arzu
- Hayaller ve Hayatlar - 2022 - Melike
- Annemizi Saklarken - 2021 - Füsun Moran
- Kuruluş: Osman - 2020 - Hazal Hatun
- Yüzleşme - 2019 - Zümrüt Karaca
- Kalbimdeki Deniz - 2016–2018 - Fikriye Yılmaz
- O Hayat Benim - 2014–2015 - Nuran
- Güldür Güldür - 2013 - Oya
- Bebek İşi - 2013 (Rahşan)
- Aldırma Gönül - 2013 - Petek Esrik
- Elde Var Hayat: Sınav - 2012 - Zehra (guest appearance)
- Ateşin Düştüğü Yer - 2012
- Elde Var Hayat - 2011 - Zehra
- Canım Babam - 2011 - Alev
- Geniş Aile - 2009–2011 - Sevim
- Bahtı Kara - 2009
- Yüreğine Sor - 2009
- Deli Deli Olma - 2008
- Kirpi - 2008 - Dilarasu
- Kısık Ateşte 15 Dakika - 2006
- Eve Dönüş - 2006
- Polis - 2006
- Doktorlar - 2006 - Fikret Eralp
- Beşinci Boyut-Bir Annenin Zor Günleri - 2005 - Zehra
- Alanya Almanya - 2005
- The İmam - 2005
- Öteki Gece - 2005
- Avrupa Yakası - 2004 - Zuhal
- Meleğin Düşüşü - 2004
- Bir Aşk Hikayesi - 2004
- İki Genç Kız - 2004
- Arapsaçı - 2004
- Günahım Neydi Allahım - 2003
- Sultan Makamı - 2003
- Azad - 2002 - Göze
- Gülbeyaz - 2002 - Meryem
- İngiliz Kemal - 2001
- Yeditepe İstanbul - 2001 - Nilgün
- Gece Martıları - 2000
- Sıcak Saatler - 1998
