= Edip Tepeli =

Turkish actor

- Born: 18 April 1989 (age 37); İzmir, Turkey
- Education: Istanbul University State Conservatory
- Occupation: Actor
- Years active: 2008–present
- Spouse: Ayşecan Tatari (m. 2017)
- Children: 1

Edip Tepeli (born 18 April 1989) is a Turkish actor. He is best known for his role as Batuga in the television series Destan.

== Life and career ==
Tepeli is a graduate of Istanbul University State Conservatory with a degree in theatre studies. After appearing in various plays at different venues, including Istanbul City Theatres, he made his television debut in 2014 with a role in the historical fiction drama series Kurt Seyit ve Şura. He continued his career on television with roles in Seni Kimler Aldı, Yıldızlar Şahidim, and Yaşamayanlar. His breakthrough came with his recurring role in Sefirin Kızı. In 2021, he was cast in a leading role in the historical fiction drama series Destan, opposite Ebru Şahin.

== Personal life ==
Tepeli is a Muslim and he resides in İzmir, Turkey. In 2017, he married Ayşecan Tatari, an actress like himself, in New York. The couple's daughter Müjgan Tepeli was born in 2020.

== Filmography ==
=== Television ===
Year	Title	Role	Network	Notes
2014	Kurt Seyit ve Şura	Galip	Star TV	11 episodes
2017	Yıldızlar Şahidim	Harun	Star TV	4 episodes
2017	Seni Kimler Aldı	Sinan	ATV	10 episodes
2017–2018	Hayati ve Diğerleri	Üzeyir Hilmi Alaplı	Kanal D	6 episodes
2019–2021	Sefirin Kızı	Kavruk Ömer	Star TV	52 episodes
2021–2022	Destan	Batuga	ATV	28 episodes
2023	Gülcemal	Mert	Fox	13 episodes
2024–	Kopuk	Bili	Fox	
2025	Kardelenler	Kahraman Korkmaz	ATV	10 episodes
2025	Sahipsizler	Aras / Hazar	Star tv	
Online platforms
2018	Yaşamayanlar	Şişman	BluTV	8 episodes

=== Film ===
Year	Title	Role	Director
2010	Eyyvah Eyvah	Waiter	Hakan Algül
2017	Yeni Başlayanlar İçin Hayatta Kalma Sanatı	Kayra Ağman	Burak Serbest

== Theatre ==
Year	Title	Role	Venue	Notes
2008	İstanbul Efendisi	İrfan	Istanbul City Theatres	Actor
2011	Ölümüne		Kenter Theatre	Actor
2012	Annemin Cinayet Listesi	Nene	Siyah, Beyaz ve Renkli	Actor
2013	Küskün Müzikal	Cousin	Kadıköy Emek Theatre	Actor
2014	Sırça Hayvan Koleksiyonu	Tom	Istanbul City Theatres	Actor
2017	Der Häßliche		DasDas	Actor
2018	Yakaranlar		DasDas	Actor
2019	Red Light Kışı		NoAct	Director, translator

Source: Tiyatrolar

== Awards ==
Year	Award	Category	Work	Result
2015	Afife Theatre Awards	The Most Successful Young Generation Artist of the Year	Sırça Hayvan Koleksiyonu	Won
2015	Lions Theatre Awards	Actor of the Year	Sırça Hayvan Koleksiyonu	Won
