= Hürkuş: Göklerdeki Kahraman =

- Film poster
- Directed by: Kudret Sabancı
- Starring: Hilmi Cem İntepe; Gizem Karaca; Miray Daner; Bora Akkaş; Zeyno Eracar; Murat Arkın; Bahadır Yenişehiroğlu; Ali Nur Türkoğlu
- Music by: Uğur Ateş
- Release date: May 25, 2018
- Country: Turkey
- Language: Turkish

Hürkuş: Göklerdeki Kahraman (lit. 'Hürkuş: The Hero in the Skies') is a 2018 historical drama film directed by Kudret Sabancı.

== Cast ==
- Hilmi Cem İntepe (Vecihi Hürkuş)
- Gizem Karaca (Hadiye)
- Miray Daner
- Bora Akkaş
- Zeyno Eracar
- Murat Arkın
- Bahadır Yenişehiroğlu
- Ali Nur Türkoğlu
- Birol Ünel
- Cem Uçan
- Eray Türk
- Efecan Dianzenza
- Gurur Aydoğan
- Hakan Yufkacıgül
- Levent Can
- Perihan Ünlücan
- Rıza Akın
