= Zuhal Topal =

Turkish actress and TV presenter (born 1975)

- Born: 23 September 1975 (age 50); Istanbul, Turkey
- Occupation: Actress
- Years active: 1993–present
- Spouse: Korhan Saygıner (m. 2008)
- Children: 1

Zuhal Topal (born 23 September 1975) is a Turkish actress and TV presenter. She has presented Turkish TV programmes. Topal graduated from the Istanbul Faculty of Architecture in Interior Architecture. She took a variety of roles by acting in many films. She was cast in popular fantasy child series "Sihirli Annem", "Selena" and fantasy comedy "Ruhsar". She played as Şükufe in franchise comedy series "Geniş Aile".

== Filmography ==
=== Television series ===
- Avrupa Avrupa: Nermin (2011–2013) TRT1
- Geniş Aile: Şukufe 2011 (episode 71) (Star)
- Geniş Aile: Şukufe 2009–2010 (Kanal D)
- Papatyam: Guest appearance 2009 (Star TV)
- Komedi Türk: Herself 2008 (Fox TV)
- Kaybolan Yıllar: Yonca
- Tutkunum Sana: Suna 2006
- Selena: Fitnat 2006 (ATV)
- Arka Sokaklar 2006
- Tarık ve Diğerleri: Kehribar 2006 (STV)
- Haylaz Babam 2005
- El Bebek Gül Bebek: Teyze 2005
- Avrupa Yakası: Guest appearance 2004
- Sihirli Annem: Suzan 2003 (Kanal D)
- Ev Hali: Mine 2002 (Show TV)
- Lahmacun ve Pizza 2002
- Reyting Hamdi 2002
- Çekirdek Aile 2000 (Kanal D)
- Zehirli Çiçek 2000 Show TV
- Dadı: Hostess 2000
- Sevda Kondu: İlknur 1999 Kanal 6
- Ruhsar 1997 (Kanal D)
- Kurşun Kalem 1996
- Yazlıkçılar 1996 (Star TV)
- Kara Melek 1996
- Çiçek Taksi 1995
- Palavra Aşklar 1995

=== Film ===
- Suluboya: Zuhal 2002
- Deli Deli Olma: Figan 2010
- Yol Palas Cinayeti: Sacide 2004
- Kirpi: Nergis 2009
