= Selin Şekerci =

Turkish actress (born 1989)

- Born: 1 June 1989 (age 36); İzmir, Turkey
- Occupation: Actress
- Years active: 2007–present
- Website: www.selinsekerci.com.tr

Selin Şekerci (born 1 June 1989) is a Turkish actress.

== Life and career ==
Selin Şekerci was born in İzmir on 1 June 1989. Her father is of Arab descent. Her mother is of Azerbaijani descent. She completed primary and secondary school education in İzmir. She participated in İzmir State Theater's plays. She played in private theaters and children's plays in İzmir. She graduated from Istanbul Bilgi University, the department of cinema-television. After coming to Istanbul, she played in many commercials.

She had guest roles in Kavak Yelleri Turkish version of Dawson's Creek and hit surreal comedy Leyla ile Mecnun. After acting in popular youth series Melekler Korusun as Özgür, she became popular. She had a leading role in romantic comedy series Kaçak Gelinler and became known for her portrayal of the character Şebnem Gürsoy in the show. She has played in many TV series.

== Filmography ==
Movie
| Year | Title | Role | Notes |
|---|---|---|---|
| 2011 | Ay Büyürken Uyuyamam | Leyla | Leading role |
| 2018 | Sevgili Komşum | Bahar | Leading role |
| 2022 | Benden Ne Olur? | Masal | Supporting role |
| 2023 | Sevda Mecburi İstikamet | Suna | Leading role |
| 2023 | Annesinin Kuzusu | | Leading role |
Web series
| Year | Title | Role | Notes |
| 2011 | Leyla ile Mecnun | Şekerpare | Guest role |
| 2021 | Yeşilçam | Mine Cansu | Leading role |
| 2021 | Dijital Sahne: Bir Yaz Gecesi Rüyası | Helena | Leading role of Episode |
TV series
| Year | Title | Role | Notes |
| 2007 | Kavak Yelleri | Feyza | Guest |
| 2009–2010 | Melekler Korusun | Özgür Çelikli | Leading role |
| 2011 | İzmir Çetesi | Mira | Supporting role |
| 2012–2014 | Benim İçin Üzülme | Irmak | Leading role |
| 2014 | Yalan Dünya | Mirey | Guest |
| 2014–2015 | Kaçak Gelinler | Şebnem Gürsoy | Leading role |
| 2015–2016 | Acı Aşk | Sude Ocak Köklükaya | Leading role |
| 2016 | Rengarenk | Renk Duygun | Leading role |
| 2016 | Kaçın Kurası | Renk Duygun | Leading role |
| 2017 | Çoban Yıldızı | Zühre Filiz | Leading role |
| 2017 | Siyah Beyaz Aşk | Ayhan Dağıstan | Joined |
| 2018–2019 | Kızım | Asu Karahan | Joined |
| 2020 | Çatı Katı Aşk | Şirin Çetin | Joined |
| 2023 | Kraliçe | Zeynep Gencer | Leading role |
| 2023 | Aile | Serap | Joined |
