= Macit Sonkan =

Turkish actor

- Born: 1953 (age 71–72); İzmir, Turkey
- Occupation: Actor
- Years active: 1978–present

Macit Sonkan (born 1953) is a Turkish actor.

Born in İzmir, Sonkan studied Fine Arts and graduated with a degree in theatre studies. In 1978, he started his career by joining the Turkish State Theatres. Meanwhile, he continued his career in both cinema and television. Sonkan also directed and took part in plays for children. For his career on stage, he won a number of national awards.

== Theatre ==
=== As actor ===
- Aşkımız Aksaray'ın En Büyük Yangını : Güngör Dilmen - Istanbul State Theatre - 2012
- Töre : Turgut Özakman - Istanbul State Theatre - 2009
- The Lower Depths : Maxim Gorky - Istanbul State Theatre - 2003
- Caligula : Albert Camus - Istanbul State Theatre - 2001
- Kamyon : Memet Baydur - Istanbul State Theatre - 1999
- Measure for Measure : William Shakespeare - Istanbul State Theatre - 1998
- Resimli Osmanlı Tarihi : Turgut Özakman - İzmir State Theatre - 1994
- A View from the Bridge : Arthur Miller - İzmir State Theatre - 1989
- Kısmet : Erhan Gökgücü - Bursa State Theatre - 1986

=== As director ===
- Spaghetti mit Ketchup : Rainer Hachfeld - Istanbul State Theatre - 2000

== Filmography ==
=== Film ===
- Melekler ve Kumarbazlar - 2009
- Güneşi Gördüm - 2009
- Avanak Kuzenler - 2008
- Dilberin Sekiz Günü - 2008
- Deli Yürek: Bumerang Cehennemi - 2001
- Abuzer Kadayıf - 2000
- İnsan Kurdu - 1997
- Acı Ve Tatlı Günler - 1996
- Camdan Kalp - 1990

=== TV film ===
- Bir Aşk Hikayesi - 2004
- Çalınan Ceset - 2004
- Kırık Zar - 2000

=== TV series ===
- Çukur - 2021
- Hercai - 2019–2021
- Alev Alev - 2012
- Aşk Bir Hayal - 2009
- Dede Korkut Hikayeleri - 2007
- Hasret - 2006
- Ezo Gelin - 2006
- Alanya Almanya - 2005
- Aşkımızda Ölüm Var - 2004
- Hayalet - 2004
- Artık Çok Geç - 2000
- Deli Yürek - 1999
- Yasemince - 1997
- Tersine Akan Nehir - 1996
- Köşe Kapmaca - 1996
- Gurbetçiler - 1996
- Çiçek Taksi - 1995
- Süper Baba - 1993
- Ateşten Günler - 1987
- Dost Eller - 1982
