= Geniş Aile =

- Also known as: Wide Family
- Genre: Comedy; Fantasy; Drama
- Developed by: D Productions (season 1); Post production (season 2 - ...)
- Written by: Kamuran Süner; Cüneyt İnay
- Directed by: Ömer Uğur
- Starring: Ufuk Özkan - Cevahir; Fırat Tanış - Bilal; Rasim Öztekin - Kuddusi; Zuhal Topal - Şükufe; İlker Ayrık - Mürsel; Bihter Dinçel - Nazan; Mine Teber - Muazzez; Halit Akçatepe - Nadir; Tanju Tuncel - Hafize; Bora Akkaş - Zekai; Yeşim Ceren Bozoğlu - Sevim; Bülent Çolak - Ulvi; Mustafa Uzunyılmaz - Devir; Esvet Şahin - Saltuk; Yiğit Demirkaya - Yiğit; Gizem Akman - Pırıl; Ahmet Sarsılmaz - Müfit; Ahmet Akın Canalioğlu - Kunter
- Theme music composer: Gripin
- Opening theme: Komşu Kızı
- Ending theme: Komşu Kızı
- Composers: Cem Erman; Kepçe Müzik
- Country of origin: Turkey
- Original language: Turkish
- No. of seasons: 3
- No. of episodes: 99+ (list of episodes)

Production
- Producers: Ahmet Kayımtu; Lale Eren
- Production location: Boyacıköy - Istanbul
- Cinematography: Serdar Armutlu
- Running time: 90 minutes
- Production company: D Productions

Original release
- Network: Kanal D
- Release: 8 July 2009 – present

Related
- Cesaretin Var mı Aşka?

Geniş Aile ('The Large Family') is a Turkish comedy television series on Kanal D, which initially broadcast in 2009. Season Finale on 15 June 2010 and was run 49 episodes - 1 season. Season 2 premiere aired on 10 August 2010. Also, It had franchise film series.

== Plot ==
Cevahir Kirişçi (Ufuk Özkan) is a 28-year-old man. He returned from Germany and he wants to get married with Şükufe (Zuhal Topal). For this reason, he quarrels with Bilal the Dark (Fırat Tanış). Cevahir's sister Nazan (Bihter Dinçel) wants to be married with Mürsel (İlker Ayrık), but every occurrence is an obstacle to the marriage. However, eventually they do get married. Cevahir's brother Zekai (Bora Akkaş) loves Pırıl (Gizem Akman), the sister of Kunter (Ahmet Akın Canalioğlu). Kunter is Zekai's close friend, too. Zekai does everything possible to be together with Pırıl. Tayanç, another boy who loves Pırıl, hates Zekai. Tayanç is also a tikky^{definition required}.

== Characters ==
Cevahir Kirişçi or commonly known as Cevo, is the protagonist of the series. He loves Şükufe very much, but Bilal the Dark does too. For this reason, Cevahir and Bilal the Dark detest one another. Cevahir does something wrong - sometimes bad, sometimes just stupid - in every episode, so he is either scolded or expelled by his father Kuddusi (Rasim Öztekin). His father calls Cevahir "useless". When Cevahir was in Germany, he met a girl called Berrak and got married with her, despite still loving Şükufe. Berrak is never seen in the series. Şükufe misses Cevahir a lot, and Bilal the Dark was - and stays - constantly around her. Cevahir left Berrak and came back to Turkey. He continues to his quarrels with Bilal the Dark. Ulvi (Bülent Çolak) is Cevahir's old friend. Cevahir always criticizes Ulvi, but he loves Ulvi like a brother. Cevahir finds a way of earning money and pleasing Şükufe. Cevahir's mother is Muazzez and he often deceives her or abuses her trust. The only person to defy him is Bilal the Dark. Cevahir calls his mother "Kız Muti" (Kiz Muti is a famous, beautiful actress.)

Şükufe is the owner of tailor shop. She is both Bilal the Dark's and Cevahir's love interest. She shows love to neither man. In fact, she is in love with Cevahir, but she is angry at him for leaving her and going to Germany.

Bilal Elagöz (Bilal the Dark) is Cevahir's main rival. This situation originated from Şükufe, because he loves her too, so he and Cevahir often quarrel.

Zekai Kirişçi or shortly Zack is Cevahir's teenage brother. He is very intelligent but always rebellious against something. He loves Pırıl, Kunter's sister. In some episodes, their friendship suffers because of Pırıl's brother Kunter being overprotective of his sister.

Mürsel Koçak is married to Nazan. He stutters and often gets stuck when speaking. He can't speak without saying "Whee!" (Hop!). He is a geography teacher at Zekai's high school.

Nazan is Cevahir's sister. She is married with Mürsel. She envies Cevahir^{explanation needed}.

Pırıl is Kunter's sister. She is Zekai's romantic interest.

Kunter is Zekai's friend and Pırıl's brother. He doesn't know about the relationship between Pırıl.

Saltuk is Zekai's best friend and main advisor. He gives advice to Zekai about Pırıl.

Tayanç (Tayanç the Tikky) is Zekai's rival. He is in love with Pırıl. He comes from a very rich family and is very snobbish.

Ulvi Mısırlıoğlu is Cevahir's closest friend and companion. He is in love with Sevim. He is quiet absent-minded and sometimes behaves inappropriately. Because of this, Cevahir often criticizes him and makes fun of him, using quite colourful language. For example, "Ulvi is a man who puts sugar into his tea again, forgetting that he had put it there already." (Çaya şeker attığını unutup bir daha atan Ulvi.) See also: Ulvi utterance

Müfit (or Müfik) (Ahmet Sarsılmaz) is Bilal the Dark's close friend and companion. He's also Ulvi's counterpart minus the stupidity. He is mute and only Bilal the Dark can understand him.

Sevim (Yeşim Ceren Bozoğlu) is Ulvi's girlfriend and later wife. She works at a shopping mall as a security worker. She is also the ex-girlfriend of Bilal.

Devir (Mustafa Uzunyılmaz) is the owner of the café in the neighborhood. He usually says "always" after he speaks.

Ümran Süreyya is the principal of Zekai's high school. He is not on good terms with Mürsel.

The Window girls or the Window Trio always remain at home. They quickly spread gossip all over the neighbourhood.

Nadide (Zeyno Gönenç) is Şükufe's sister. She is in love with Devir.

== Parents ==
=== Cevahir's Parents ===
Kuddusi Kirişçi (Rasim Öztekin) is Cevahir's father. He is a seller of dried fruits and nuts. Cevahir is a useless son according to him, and he often expels Cevahir from his house.

Muazzez Kirişçi (Mine Teber) is Cevahir's mother. She often criticizes Kuddusi. She wants Mürsel and Nazan to have a child.

Nadir Kirişçi (Halit Akçatepe) is Cevahir's grandfather and Kuddusi's father. He is the oldest person at home and his advice is always followed. He is partially deaf.

Hafize Kirişçi (Tanju Tuncel) is Cevahir's grandmother and Kuddusi's mother. She often knows Cevahir's plans, but she can't keep secrets, so she often reveals what he wants to do. She says "infidel" to any person she meets.

=== Bilal's Parents ===
Ali Ekber Elagöz(Ali Tutal) is Bilal's father. He is a whitewares seller. Bilal always tries to take money from him. Father can marry her as soon as possible to ensure proper one is engaged. "Seed" or "Dark Kavruk as" call to Bilal. (First appears in episode 15th)

Adeviye Elagöz(Sevim Gelenbe) is Bilal's mother. First appears in episode 35th. Son is very fond of her. holds her son's underwear is always. She also wants to marry his son clean. She always tells his son to wear underpants on two consecutive. So believe go aides that his son's chances.

== Season 2 ==
Geniş Aile in Turkey will be air on 10 August 2010.

== USA Airdate ==
Geniş Aile, in the United States will be aired in 2011 by an unknown English Licensor Company.
