= Hercai =

2019 Turkish romantic drama television series

- Genre: Romance; Drama
- Created by: Sümeyye Koç
- Based on: Hercai by Sümeyye Ezel
- Written by: Eda Tezcan; Feraye Şahin
- Directed by: Cem Karci; Benal Tairi; Barış Yöş; Ali İlhan
- Starring: Akın Akınözü; Ebru Şahin; Serhat Tutumluer; Ayda Aksel; Macit Sonkan; Gülçin Santırcıoğlu; Güven Hokna; Oya Unustası; Ahmet Tansu Taşanlar Ahmad Harhash
- Theme music composer: Ender Gündüzlü; Metin Arıgül
- Country of origin: Türkiye
- Original language: Turkish
- No. of seasons: 3
- No. of episodes: 69

Production
- Producer: Banu Akdeniz
- Production location: Midyat
- Running time: 150 minutes
- Production company: Mia Yapım

Original release
- Network: ATV
- Release: March 15, 2019 – April 25, 2021

Hercai (Inconstant Love) is a Turkish romantic television series starring Akın Akınözü and Ebru Şahin, along with Gülçin Santırcıoğlu, Serhat Tutumluer, Oya Unustası and Ahmet Tansu Taşanlar. It premiered on ATV on March 15, 2019. Additionally, ATV sold rights to air the series in various international markets, including most of Latin America and the United States through Telemundo, which premiered on June 22, 2021. In Pakistan, it airs on TV One.

== Plot ==
Reyyan is Nasuh Şadoğlu's granddaughter, patriarch of the prominent Şadoğlu family in the town of Midyat. However, she has never felt loved by anyone in her household except her father, Hazar, her mother, Zehra, and her younger sister, Gül.

One morning, Reyyan goes out on horseback to watch the sunrise. On her way back, her horse is nearly hit by a car. Reyyan falls and loses consciousness. The driver of the car, a handsome young man named Miran, is immediately attracted to her and offers to drive her back home. Yaren, daughter of Hazar's brother, Cihan, is infatuated with Miran. Miran's plan all along was to gain the trust of the Şadoğlu family, marry their innocent daughter and then leave her the morning after, humiliating the entire family and thus, exacting the first part of his revenge against the Şadoğlus.

Azize Aslanbey, who told him since he was a child that he has to avenge the murder of his parents and uplift his family's name once again. However, his feelings for Reyyan were the real, and his actions were done against his will under the guiding hand of his grandmother. As a result, Miran struggles to cope with what he has done to Reyyan.

As time goes on, secrets are revealed while Reyyan and Miran struggle with their feelings for each other. Reyyan is in love with Miran, but is convincing herself she hates him, while Miran struggles with extreme guilt for what he has done to the one person he has truly cared about. Meanwhile, Azize also struggles to keep her control her daughter-in-law, Sultan, and her granddaughter, Elif—who was orphaned as a child and raised by Azize—and she begins tightening her grip as the unforgiving matriarch of the Aslanbey family.

Despite his hatred for the Şadoğlu family, Miran works hard to regain Reyyan's trust. It takes Reyyan a long time, but she realises she cannot live without Miran. Eventually, she marries him in earnest without her family's approval.

They find a clue about the death of Miran's parents and follow it together, which leads them to Miran's maternal grandmother, Şükran, who Miran believed to be dead his entire life. While traveling to Istanbul, they find another lead that reveals Miran's mother was never raped, and discover Azize bribed the police to lie in their report that she had been raped before her death. Miran breaks down and he begins questioning everything he's been told regarding his parents' death. Azize, angry that Miran has learned the truth, begins tracking Miran and Reyyan, making sure that any new leads they find become dead ends. When confronted by Miran, she claims that, although his mother was never raped, she was indeed murdered by Hazar. She slowly regains Miran's trust, who believes her to be contrite. Meanwhile, Reyyan knows Azize is still lying to Miran, and becomes increasingly frustrated at her inability to break Miran's connection to his grandmother.

During this time the family rivalry intensifies. Elif, who has always been tormented by Azize's cruelty, escapes her house marries Azat, Reyyan's older cousin, in yet another attempt to make peace between the families. However, Elif's efforts turn out to be in vain and she slips into a deep depression at her grandmother's intense hatred of her husband and desire for revenge. Elif, exasperated by the never-ending fighting and a feeling that Azat will never love her the way she loves him, commits suicide.

After the death of Elif, the enmity between both families cools. Miran and Reyyan, fed up with both families, decide to move to Istanbul permanently. Azize, who needs Miran as a pawn in her revenge, sets Miran up to shoot Azat while Reyyan watches from afar. This causes the hatred to come back in full force. Azat's life is saved by a stranger who befriends the Şadoğlu family. He hides his real identity as he is actually Aslan Aslanbey, the true heir of the Aslanbey family. Azize faked his death and kept him hidden to protect him from the rivalry between the families.

Yaren, tired of Miran and Reyyan's undaunted love for each other, reveals to Reyyan out of spite that Hazar is not her biological father. Reyyan, angry at her family for lying to her, escapes to Miran's maternal grandmother's home. Miran and Hazar follow Reyyan, hoping to calm her anger. When they reach Şükran's home, they discover a recording of a conversation between Miran's mother, Dilşah, and a friend, in which she confesses her love for Hazar, and tells her friend that Azize is trying to force her to marry her son. Miran takes the tape, and finally accepts that Hazar did not kill his mother. He then learns that it was his father, Mehmet, who tried to kill Dilşah and Hazar, and later killed himself.

Meanwhile, Aslan is working with Reyyan's real father, Mahfuz, who has come back to help his daughter expose Azize. However, Aslan becomes obsessed with Reyyan and loses focus. He attempts to kill Miran out of jealousy, and nearly succeeds. Upon a second attempt, he ends up causing his own death. At the same time, Fusun Aslanbey, Azize's sister-in-law, returns and reveals to everyone Miran is not an Aslanbey: his real father is not Mehmet Aslanbey, but Hazar Şadoğlu. Upon learning this, Miran reaches his breaking point. He takes Reyyan with him and they move into a rural cottage to escape their reality.

When Miran learns the truth, Hazar makes attempts at building a relationship with his son, but Miran is not interested. Later, Miran plays the rest of the tape he took from his mother's room. In it, she tells her friend she is pregnant with Hazar's child; she wishes for it to be a boy, and plans to name him Miran. Any doubt Miran had that Hazar is his real father disappears. Meanwhile, Reyyan comes face to face with her real father and accepts his only request—that she let him hug her. Upon seeing her forgiving her own father, Miran turns to Hazar and accepts him as his father.

Nasuh begins chasing the reasons for Azize's strong hatred of his family. He discovers her real name is Ayşe, his first love. He confronts her, and asks her why she hates his family. Azize shares their past, including the child they had together, and their plans to get married. However, one day, Azize woke up to find her house engulfed in flames, and fainted from smoke inhalation. When she woke up a few days later, Nasuh's mother informed Azize that her entire family, including their child, died in the fire. Nasuh's mother tells Azize that Nasuh has remarried, and blames her for their child's death. Feeling betrayed, Azize decides to get revenge. Her original plan was to punish Hazar by taking away his daughter. However, after Mehmet killed himself, her hatred intensified and she plotted a plan for vengeance using Miran. Nasuh is shocked, and explains to Azize that his mother had told him Azize died in the fire, which is why he remarried. Nasuh also tells Azize their child never died, but is the same Hazar whose life she has been trying to destroy.

To show how remorseful she is for her sins, Azize reveals that Miran's mother, Dilşah, is alive. Having been locked away from reality for so long, Dilşah is struggling mentally to adapt to her new life. Miran, however, is overjoyed at being reunited with his mother. Meanwhile, Reyyan, upon seeing Azize's state and learning the origin of her hatred toward Hazar and Miran, convinces Miran to forgive Azize.

Reyyan, now pregnant, is told by her doctor that she will not survive the birth of her child, so she wishes Miran to have his entire family by his side should she die during childbirth. While Miran struggles to cope with the possibility of losing Reyyan, Hazar is still in shock after learning Azize is his mother.

When Reyyan goes into labour, she slips into a coma. Meanwhile, Hazar is killed. Miran is wracked with grief over losing his father and the possibility of losing Reyyan, leaving him unable to find any joy in the birth of his son. Reyyan eventually wakes up from her coma, and is devastated when she learns of Hazar's death. The series ends with the families moving on from their pasts and the rivalry finally over.

== Cast ==
- Akın Akınözü as Miran Aslanbey/Şadoğlu
- Ebru Şahin as Reyyan Aslanbey/Şadoğlu
- Ayda Aksel as Azize Aslanbey / Ayşe Derbent/Şadoğlu
- Macit Sonkan as Nasuh Şadoğlu
- Gülçin Santırcıoğlu as Sultan Aslanbey
- Serhat Tutumluer as Hazar Şadoğlu
- Feride Çetin as Zehra Şadoğlu
- Oya Unustası as Gönül Aslanbey/Şadoğlu
- Ahmet Tansu Taşanlar as Azat Şadoğlu
- Serdar Özer as Cihan Şadoğlu
- Gülçin Hatıhan as Handan Şadoğlu
- İlay Erkök as Yaren Şadoğlu/Bakırcıoğlu
- Cahit Gök as Fırat Demiralp/Aslanbey
- Güneş Hayat as Esma Demiralp
- Aydan Burhan as Hanife Derbent
- İnci Şen as Nigar Katarcı
- Aslı Samat as Melike Aştutan
- Eylem Tanrıver as Keriman Çetin
- Ebrar Alya Demirbilek as Gül Şadoğlu
- Eda Elif Başlamışlı/Duygu Yetiş as Elif Aslanbey / Şadoğlu
- Gökhan Yavuz as Rıza Demir
- Kutay Şahin as Mehmet Aslanbey
- Aysun Metiner as Dilşah Aslanbey
- Yusuf Bedir as Bedirhan
- Burak Tamdoğan as Filipos
- Rana Cabbar as Gabriel
- Emrullah Omay as Mahmut Kim
- Aydan Taş as Şehriyar Taşkın
- Sarp İkiler as Caner Katarcı
- Güven Hokna as Şükran
- Ahmet Kayakesen as Harun Bakırcıoğlu
- Ferzan Hekimoğlu as Dennis
- Zuhal Yalçın as Asiye
- Doğan Bayraktar as Aslan Aslanbey
- Barış Yalçın as Mahfuz
- Elvan Demirez as şeyda
- Ayşegül Günay as Füsun Aslanbey/Bakırcıoğlu
- Dilaray Yeşilyaprak as Zeynep Aslanbey
- Yılmaz Gruda as Dede
- Sera Kutlubey as Azra Bakırcıoğlu / Güneș Bakırcıoğlu
- Ahmad Harhash as Ahmet Aslanbey

== Series overview ==
| Season | Episodes | Originally released | |
| Season | Episodes | First released | Last released |
|---|---|---|---|
| 1 | 12 | March 15, 2019 | May 31, 2019 |
| 2 | 26 | September 20, 2019 | March 27, 2020 |
| 3 | 31 | September 18, 2020 | April 25, 2021 |
