= Bora Akkaş =

Turkish actor

- Born: Doğa Bora Akkaş; 12 October 1990 (age 35); Istanbul, Turkey
- Occupations: Actor, singer
- Years active: 2002–present
- Spouses: Seda Türkmen (m. 2017; div. 2019) Oben Alkan (m. 2023)
- Children: 1

Doğa Bora Akkaş (born 12 October 1990) is a Turkish actor and occasional singer.

== Life and career ==
Akkaş was primarily trained in city theaters and acted for the first time in the movie Gönlümdeki Köşk Olmasa. He received the Golden Orange award for his performance in this film. He simultaneously started his music career and was a bass guitar member of the music band "Hakunamatata". Initially, he worked under A4 Records, but he later continued his work and produced tracks on his own. In 2008, he was a contestant on the "Miller Music Factory" competition together with Deniz Gürzumar, with whom he performed the song "Bize Kızma" and ranked second. In 2009, he starred in the movie Adab-ı Muaşeret. He was recognized for his role as Zekai Kirişçi in the hit comedy series and films Geniş Aile. He was also a regular in the series Annem Uyurken, where he played the role of Mert. Akkaş's other notable credits include Her Şey Yolunda Merkez, Bebek İşi and Yüksek Giriş.

== Personal life ==
On 19 August 2017 he married actress Seda Türkmen. In August 2019, Türkmen filed for divorce. Their divorce was finalized in September 2019. On 3 February 2023, he married blogger Oben Alkan. Their daughter, Suzan, was born later in the same year.

== Credits ==
=== Web series ===
- Yeşilçam (Hakan) (2021)
- Ayak İşleri (Kaner) (2022)
- Erşan Kuneri (Many roles) (2022)
- Magarsus (Yılmaz Kaya) (2023)

=== TV series ===
- Dişi Kuş (2004)
- Yağmur Zamanı (Bora) (2004)
- Son Tercih (Mert) (2007)
- Cesaretin Var mı Aşka (2008)
- Unutma Beni (2008)
- Geniş Aile (Zekai Kirişçi) (2009–2011)
- Annem Uyurken (Mert) (2012)
- Herşey Yolunda Merkez (Efe Selim) (2013)
- Herşey Yolunda (Efe Selim) (2013)
- Yüksek Giriş (Doğukan) (2013)
- Bebek İşi (Ozan) (2013)
- Boynu Bükükler (Mithat) (2014)
- Ruhumun Aynası (Çetin) (2014)
- Çifte Saadet (Tarık Çatık) (2016)
- Dayan Yüreğim (Rıfat) (2017)
- Aslan Ailem (Mutlu Aslan) (2017–2018)
- Kurşun (Rıfat Ayaz) (2019)
- Dengi Dengine (Mert) (2019)
- Tutunamayanlar (Yağiz) (2020)
- Menajerimi Ara (Himself) (2020)
- İçimizden Biri (Adam Wilson) (2021)
- Üç Kuruş (Çetin) (2022)

=== Film ===
- Gönlümdeki Köşk Olmasa (Küçük Osman) (2002)
- Küçük Kıyamet (Batu) (2007)
- Adab-ı Muaşeret (Eko) (2009)
- Memleket Meselesi (2010)
- Çalgı Çengi (2010)
- Kaos: Örümcek Ağı (2012)
- Yavuz (2012)
- Taş Mektep (2013)
- Kocan Kadar Konuş (Mehmet Lütfı) (2015)
- Öğrenci İşleri (Umut) (2015)
- Geniş Aile: Yapıştır (Zekai) (2015)
- Kocan Kadar Konuş: Diriliş (Mehmet Lütfı) (2016)
- Annemin Yarası (Salih) (2016)
- Geniş Aile 2: Her Türlü (Zekai) (2016)
- Ay Lav Yu Tuu (Fırat) (2017)
- Hürkuş: Göklerdeki Kahraman (Mehmet) (2018)
- Sen Hiç Atesböcegi Gördün mü? (Veli) (2021)

=== Theatre ===
- Kabin (2013)
- Yen (2016)
