= Mrs. Fazilet and Her Daughters =

Turkish television series

- Turkish: Fazilet Hanım ve Kızları
- Genre: Family drama
- Written by: Sırma Yanık
- Story by: Sırma Yanık
- Directed by: Murat Saraçoğlu (episode 1–13); Gökçen Usta (episode 14–50)
- Starring: see cast
- Theme music composer: Alp Yenier
- Composer: Alp Yenier
- Country of origin: Turkey
- Original language: Turkish
- No. of seasons: 2
- No. of episodes: 50

Production
- Producer: Şükrü Avşar
- Running time: 130 minutes
- Production company: Avşar Film

Original release
- Network: Star TV
- Release: 25 March 2017 – 9 June 2018

Related
- Las hijas de la señora García (2024–2025)

Mrs. Fazilet and Her Daughters (Turkish: Fazilet Hanım ve Kızları) is a Turkish drama television series.

== Plot ==
The series depicts a story of a single mother, Fazilet and her two daughters, Hazan and Ece. Fazilet is eager to improve her family's financial and social standing by pushing her younger daughter Ece into a competition of fashion and modelling. Fazilet's older daughter Hazan works as a fitness trainer and has strained relationship with her mother as she is against her financial ambitions. However while working as a fitness trainer, Hazan falls in love with a spoiled rich man (Sinan) and their relationship changes both families lives forever. Ece, the younger sister, is a high schooler, that follows her mother dictates is in love with neighbour Yasin since young. Yasin is also her classmate and basketball player who loves Ece madly.

== Cast and characters ==
| Actor/actress | Character | Description | Episode |
|---|---|---|---|
| Nazan Kesal | Fazilet Çamkıran | Hazan's and Ece's mother | 1–50 |
| Deniz Baysal | Hazan Çamkıran | Fazilet's eldest daughter, Ece's sister, Sinan's ex-girlfriend/ fiancee, Yağız's wife. | 1–50 |
| Çağlar Ertuğrul | Yağız Egemen/Mehmet Yıldız | | 1–50 |
| Afra Saraçoğlu | Ece Çamkıran | | 1–50 |
| Alp Navruz | Sinan Egemen | | 1–50 |
| Mahir Günşiray | Hazım Egemen | | 1–50 |
| Tolga Güleç | Gökhan Egemen | | 1–50 |
| Hazal Türesan | Yasemin Egemen/Cemile | | 1–50 |
| İdris Nebi Taşkan | Yasin Demirkol | | 1–50 |
| Ecem Baltacı | Selin Egemen | | 1–50 |
| Tuğba Melis Türk | Nil | | 1–13, 30–50 |
| Gülsen Tuncer | Güzide Egemen | | 3–18 |
| Türkan Kılıç | Kerime Yıldız | | 2–50 |

== Episodes ==
| Season | Episodes | Originally aired | | |
| Season | Episodes | First aired | Last aired | Network |
|---|---|---|---|---|
| 1 | 13 | March 25, 2017 | June 17, 2017 | |
| 2 | 37 | September 9, 2017 | June 9, 2018 | |

== Awards and nominations ==
- The series was deemed worthy of the Best TV Series Award at the Türkiye Youth Awards.
- Alp Navruz received the best debut artist award at the Türkiye Golden Tourism Awards.
