= Yeşilçam (TV series) =

2021 Turkish television series

- Also known as: Yeşilçam: Bir Sinema Hayvanı
- Genre: Historical drama; Romance
- Created by: BluTV
- Starring: Çağatay Ulusoy; Afra Saraçoğlu; Selin Şekerci
- Country of origin: Turkey
- Original language: Turkish
- No. of seasons: 2
- No. of episodes: 20

Production
- Running time: 45 minutes
- Production company: Sunset film

Original release
- Release: April 22 – December 10, 2021

Yeşilçam is a period drama directed by Çağan Irmak and written by Volkan Sümbül and Levent Cantek. The series, broadcast on Turkish digital platform BluTV, is about Turkish cinema in 1960s. It stars Çağatay Ulusoy, Afra Saraçoğlu and Selin Şekerci in the leading roles.

== Cast ==
- Çağatay Ulusoy - Semih Ateş
- Afra Saraçoğlu - Tülin Saygı
- Selin Şekerci - Mine Cansu
- Ayta Sözeri - Kuvvet
- Güngör Bayrak - Belkıs
- Nilüfer Açıkalın - Adviye
- Bora Akkaş - Hakan İncekara
- Özgür Çevik - İzzet Orkan
- Yetkin Dikinciler - Reha Esmer
- Kanbolat Görkem Arslan - Niyazi
- Altan Erkekli - Mümtaz
- Bige Önal - Gazel
- Hilmi Cem İntepe - Yusuf
- Devrim Nas - Erhan
- Muhammet Uzuner - Ekrem Haznedaroğlu

== Plot ==
A story of a producer's survival during the golden years of Turkish cinema known as Yeşilçam. Semih Ateş is a young, handsome and ambitious film producer who is the owner of Ateş Film. When he is betrayed by his business partner Vehbi, Semih is forced to leave everything behind and start a journey from scratch. He immediately opens a new company named Büyük Ateş Film and aims to make a successful film as soon as possible in order to survive in the Turkish film industry. At the same time, he tries to win back his unforgettable ex-wife, Yeşilçam's famous actress Mine Cansu. Hakan, who is both Semih's partner and Mine's brother, introduces Tülin to Semih, whom he saw by chance and believed to have starlight. Tülin, a young and talented girl, will slowly change the balance in Semih's life.

== Production ==
=== Script ===
Yeşilçam is the third collaboration between the scriptwriters Levent Cantek and Volkan Sümbül. They wrote the pilot in forty days and then wrote all ten episodes within five months. Turkey's leading digital platform BluTV ordered the 2nd season in October 2019, and it was completed by December 2020.

In an interview, Levent Cantek said he watched about 80 percent of the films released in Turkey in 1964 to understand better the political atmosphere and people's ways of living.

=== Casting and crew ===
There were speculations about Çağatay Ulusoy joining the project being produced by ES film since Çağan Irmak, the director of the project started following him on social media. BluTV announced on December 5, 2020, that they are producing a period drama series that will showcase Turkey in the 1960s and confirmed the news that Çağatay Ulusoy is gonna be the leading actor.

Afra Saracoglu was then signed as one of the leading actresses of the project. In the show, Çağatay Ulusoy gives life to a film producer named Semih Ateş as he loses everything in the cinema world and tries to rise from his ashes and regain everything through his newly found company as he experiences the golden age of Turkish cinema.

At the same time Afra Saraçoğlu and Selin Şekerci accompany Çağatay Ulusoy. Afra Saraçoğlu plays the role of young and beautiful Tülin Saygı who knocks on the door of Turkish cinema Yeşilçam to become a true artist while Selin plays the role of Mine Cansu, one of the most beloved names of the industry and ex-wife of Semih Ateş. In addition to Çağatay Ulusoy, Afra Saraçoğlu and Selin Şekerci, successful and master names such as Güngör Bayrak, Nilüfer Açıkalın, Altan Erkekli, Yetkin Dikinciler, Özgür Çevik, Ayta Sözeri and Bora Akkaş meet in the cast of Yeşilçam.

Çağan Irmak became the director of the project. This was the first time Çağatay Ulusoy and Çağan Irmak were working together although they had already met each other during the 2015 Rome film festival. Speaking about Çağan Irmak, Çağatay Ulusoy said in an interview with Episode Yerli that Çağan is a master director who has a lot of knowledge about the era which is shown in the series. It is one of the few productions in which Çağan Irmak didn't write the script.

=== Filming ===
Filming of the series began in January 2021. Filming was done in Istanbul in the Beyoğlu district near Taksim Square. It was also done in Yeşilçam street and Ayhan Işık street. Due to the COVID-19 pandemic, all the restaurants were closed, so the crew didn't have to take care of onlookers. The mayor of Beyoğlu district visited the series set and assured the crew that even due to the pandemic, work on the series should not stop. It is the highest budgeted series of BluTV. Istanbul serves as a necessary "actor" for the series. The show focuses on the political and social changes of Turkey. Gökhan Tiryaki was the director of photography. In Seka Park in İzmit, 55,000 m^{2} (590,000 sq ft) of indoor space and 300,000 m^{2} (3,200,000 sq ft) of open space, the filming on Europe's largest film plateau shows every detail of 1960s, from Beyoğlu's famous venues to nostalgic trams of İstiklal Avenue.

== Overview ==
Season	Episodes	Originally released	
Season	Episodes	First released	Last released
1	10	April 22, 2021	June 10, 2021
2	10	October 28, 2021	December 10, 2021

=== Season 1 (2021) ===
No. overall	No. in season	Title	Directed by	Written by	Original release date
1	1	"I'll Make a Movie That'll Cure the Ill"	Çağan Irmak	Levent Cantek, Volkan Sümbül	April 22, 2021
2	2	"Queen's Tears"	Çağan Irmak	Levent Cantek, Volkan Sümbül	April 22, 2021
3	3	"Dancing Child"	Çağan Irmak	Levent Cantek, Volkan Sümbül	April 29, 2021
4	4	"One September Day"	Çağan Irmak	Levent Cantek, Volkan Sümbül	April 29, 2021
5	5	"Where is the Love, Where is the Corpse?"	Çağan Irmak	Levent Cantek, Volkan Sümbül	May 6, 2021
6	6	"Little Big Wounds"	Çağan Irmak	Levent Cantek, Volkan Sümbül	May 13, 2021
7	7	"Flowers and Weeds"	Çağan Irmak	Levent Cantek, Volkan Sümbül	May 20, 2021
8	8	"Cage"	Çağan Irmak	Levent Cantek, Volkan Sümbül	May 27, 2021
9	9	"Problematic Movie"	Çağan Irmak	Levent Cantek, Volkan Sümbül	June 3, 2021
10	10	"The Hell Within Us"	Çağan Irmak	Levent Cantek, Volkan Sümbül	June 10, 2021

=== Season 2 (2021) ===
First part of season 2 released on 28 October 2021 with first five episodes. Second part was released on 10 December 2021

No. overall	No. in season	Title	Directed by	Written by	Original release date
11	1	"Nice House"	Çağan Irmak	Levent Cantek, Volkan Sümbül	October 28, 2021
12	2	"A Snake by the Sea"	Çağan Irmak	Levent Cantek, Volkan Sümbül	October 28, 2021
13	3	"The Happiest Fire in Istanbul"	Çağan Irmak	Levent Cantek, Volkan Sümbül	October 28, 2021
14	4	"An Apartment in Beyoğlu"	Çağan Irmak	Levent Cantek, Volkan Sümbül	October 28, 2021
15	5	"4 Years Ago"	Çağan Irmak	Levent Cantek, Volkan Sümbül	October 28, 2021
16	6	"Casualties"	Çağan Irmak	Levent Cantek, Volkan Sümbül	December 10, 2021
17	7	"Passport Size"	Çağan Irmak	Levent Cantek, Volkan Sümbül	December 10, 2021
18	8	"Perforated Pear"	Çağan Irmak	Levent Cantek, Volkan Sümbül	December 10, 2021
19	9	"Belkis"	Çağan Irmak	Levent Cantek, Volkan Sümbül	December 10, 2021
20	10	"Travel to the Moon"	Çağan Irmak	Levent Cantek, Volkan Sümbül	December 10, 2021

== Reception ==
Yesilcam had a gala premiere a day before its release. The show was praised by critics. Many praised Cagatay Ulusoy for his portrayal of Semih Ates. Many commented on how it takes the viewer to the nostalgic period. Turkish site Beyazperde had criticized the characters of the series and said they didn't match with the settings of the 1960s.However it praised Cagatay ulusoy, Yetkin Dikinciler, Altan ekrekeli and Ozgur Cevik.It, in particular, praised Cagatay Ulusoy and mentioned that he suits the role, and Ozgur Cevik lives it to the fullest. Overall, it gave a positive review when subsequent episodes were released. Another critic commented about great acting while praising the script and master director Cagan Irmak for showing realism.

Yesilcam was an excellent success for the digital platform Blutv. After the first two episodes were released on 22 April 2021, the CEO of the platform himself announced that the viewership numbers were very high and thanked the audience for showing interest in the project. In addition, the dance sequence of Cagatay Ulusoy and Afra Saracoglu was praised. The actors had undergone practice for a week to perfect it.
