= Destan (TV series) =

2021 Turkish historical television series

- Series Poster
- Also known as: Epic
- Genre: Historical; Action; Adventure
- Written by: Nehir Erdem (1-21/28); Ayşe Ferda Eryılmaz (1-21/28); İhsan Yıldırım (22-27); Eda Karakoç (22-27); Mustafa Dinç (22-27); Nermin Aslan (22-27)
- Directed by: Emir Khalilzadeh (1-6); Fethi Bayram (7-27); Metin Günay (7-27); Ali Aytaç Sakal (28)
- Starring: Ebru Şahin; Edip Tepeli; Selim Bayraktar
- Composers: Zeynep Alasya; Caner Özkan; Ertan Özkan
- Country of origin: Turkey
- Original language: Turkish
- No. of seasons: 1
- No. of episodes: 28

Production
- Executive producer: Sema Duran
- Producer: Mehmet Bozdağ
- Production locations: Istanbul, Beykoz
- Cinematography: Halil Aslan; Hasan Özhan Sari
- Running time: 150 minutes
- Production company: Bozdağ Film

Original release
- Network: ATV
- Release: November 23, 2021 – September 15, 2022

Destan (English: Epic), is a Turkish historical action drama series produced by Mehmet Bozdağ, directed by Emir Khalilzadeh, Fethi Bayram and Metin Günay, and written by Nehir Erdem and Ayşe Ferda Eryılmaz. The leading roles are Ebru Şahin, Edip Tepeli and Selim Bayraktar. The plot is fictional, inspired by Turkish epics rather than historical reality.

The show depicts the epic love story of Akkiz, who was orphaned through Alpagu Khan's killing of her father, and Batuga, Alpagu's disabled son, and their journey to gain justice and exact revenge on the Gök Khan.

== Premise ==
The story takes place in the 8th century before the Turks converted to Islam. The tale starts with Alpagu Khan (Selim Bayraktar) whose infantrymen were killed because of a Chinese-led trap. Following this betrayal, his brother Balamir Yabghu (Teoman Kumbaracibaşi) finds a note on a Chinese soldier which reveals that Alpagu's wife, Tılsım Hatun, betrayed him, and that she and her father had formed an alliance with China to destroy the Gök Khaganate. Upon learning this, Alpagu kills Tılsım Hatun, thereby orphaning his son, Batuga (Edip Tepeli).

It is not based on real story.

== Plot ==
Whilst on a journey, Alpagu Khan and his Alps are ambushed by a Chinese-led trap, in which Alpagu comes out victorious, at the cost of 249 Alps. Balamir Yabgu finds a note on one of the Chinese soldiers, which labels Tilsim Hatun (Alpagu's second wife) and her father Toygar Khan as the ones responsible for informing China of Alpagu's journey and thereby betraying Alpagu. Alpagu thereby kills his wife Tilsim, her father Toygar Khan and Evren Alp, father of Akkiz, thereby orphaning Akkiz and Tilsim and Alpagu's disabled son, Batuga. Batuga then pretends to be insane in order to save himself from death by strangling, and Akkiz swears revenge. 15 years later, Alpagu arranges for Batuga's marriage to his cousin Kircicek, daughter of Balamir Yabgu. While on the way to ask for Kircicek's hand, Alpagu is shot by Akkiz, which results in Dag Tribe being raided and Akkiz and many other girls taken prisoner. Akkiz and Batuga reunite after briefly meeting 15 years ago, and Batuga reveals to Akkiz that he is actually not insane. Batuga eventually helps Akkiz escape Gok Palace. Akkiz then reveals that she is the "Paw of the Two Headed Wolf" in front of the entire council due to being threatened with Batuga. Alpagu is about to have Akkiz executed when Batuga storms in, revealing that he is not insane, and finally speaking after 15 years. Batuga and Akkiz then escape the palace and engage in a conflict with Alpagu Khan. It is also revealed that Tilsim Bike and her father were not traitors, but had been framed by Ulu Ece. They finally make peace after the arrival of the Itbraklar. Batuga then manages to finally heal his disabled arm and foot, and is the one to lead the war against the Itbraklars along with Alpagu. The series ends with Akkiz and Batuga marrying, and Batuga is appointed as Yabgu of the West Gok Khanate. While they are judging Ulu Ece for sending a fake letter, the Itbraklar sneak in through the passage and bomb the throne room. Kaya Tegin, Alpagu Han and a pregnant Gunseli Hatun die in the blast and the Chinese Emperor, father of Mei Jin, Li Dan, comes and tries to make Temur Tegin a Han. Temur refuses, and the Chinese attack them. Batuga, Akkiz, Temur, Colpan and Calayir escape. Ulu Ece and KuzU Beg get captured. Calayir and Colpan die and are eaten by dogs. All of them get captured, except for Akkiz who goes and makes a woman army. They come and attack the palace and win, and Akkiz chops of Li Dan's head. One Chinese man was left. Temur Tegin was shot dead by the Chinese soldier. Batuga was killed by Ulu Ece, who was then killed by Akkiz. Akkiz takes the throne and becomes the Ulu Ece before giving birth to a boy.

== Cast and characters ==
- Ebru Şahin as Akkız. The wife of Batuga Tegin. The daughter-in-law of Alpagu Han and Ulu Ece. The sister-in-law of Gunseli Hatun and Mei jin.
- Edip Tepeli as Batuga. The son of Alpagu Han and Tilsim Bike. Step son of Ulu Ece. Younger brother of Kaya and Temur. He cannot open his left hand. The husband of Akkiz.
- Selim Bayraktar as Alpagu Khan The husband of Tilsim Bike, and Ulu Ece. Killed Tilsim Bike after Ulu Ece had given fake evidences of her being a traitor. The father of Kaya Yagbu, Temur Tegin and Batuga Tegin.
- Kanbolat Görkem Arslan as Saltuk Bey In love with Colpan Han. The Beg of Alpagu Han. Is stabbed in the back and killed.
- Teoman Kumbaracıbaşı as Balamir Bey. The brother of Alpagu. Died in his brother's arms. The father of Kircicek. Believes he can rule the state better than Alpagu.
- Deniz Barut as Ulu Ece/Princess Vera. The first wife of Alpagu Han. The mother of Kaya and Temur. Has a sister who appeared to be Akkiz's mother. Is responsible for framing Tilsim Bike.
- Elif Doğan as Tutkun The love interest of Temur, captured by Saltuk Beg. The daughter/kind of like Colpan Hatun's daughter. Killed by a magician.
- İpek Karapınar as Çolpan Hatun, the Khan of Dag tribe, aunt of Batuga.
- Burak Tozkoparan as Temur. The son of Alpagu Han, and Ulu ece. Brother of Kaya and Batuga. Husband of Mei Jin. Falls in love with Tutkun after Saltuk Bey attacks their tribe and imprisons them.
- Buse Meral as Sirma The wife of Yaman, The best friend of Akkiz.
- Burak Berkay Akgül as Kaya. The husband of Gunseli. Seeks to become Han, and kill Batuga and Akkiz.
- Osman Albayrak as Vargi Bey. Previously in love with Ulu ece.
- Şahin Ergüney as Kün Ata
- Ahmet Olgun Sünear as Yaman. The husband of Sirma. A close friend to Akkiz.
- Alper Düzen as Danış Ata. The advisor of Alpagu Han.
- Ecem Sena Bayır as Günseli Hatun The wife of Kaya. Cannot have children, The daughter of a Khorsan beg Ozman beg

- Meltem Pamirtan as Yibek Kadın
- Esra Kılıç as Princess Mei Jin. The wife of Temur Tegin. The daughter of a Chinese Emperor.
- Hilal Uysun as Tılsım Bike. The mother of Batuga Tegin. The wife of Alpagu Han. Killed by her husband after Ulu ece gave fake evidence as showing her as a traitor.
- Evren Erler as Çalayır. The aider of Gunseli Hatun. Sends word to Akkiz about Alpagu's every move at the Gok Saray.
- Bilgi Aydoğmuş as Kırçiçek Bike. Daughter of Balamir Beg.
- Engin Benli as Obar.
- Faruk Aran as Kuzu Bey
- Müge Duygun as Tilbe
- Umut Temızaş as Kamaz
- Mehmet Sertakan as Tayangu Yalvaç
- Özgür Koç as Barsuk
- Aysel Yıldırım as Kam Kadın
- Seca Naz Karabulut as İlay
- Berna Üçkaleler as Efil
- Onur Yenidünya as Evren Alp. Father of Akkiz. Killed by Alpagu Han.
- Doruk Şengezer as Öktem
- Gürkan Çolaker as Kıraç
- Muharrem Özcan as Tai Zu
- Doğanay Ünal as Yula Bey
- Sema Şimşek as Alaca. Returned as Akkiz's mother, Sister of Ulu ece.
- Cihangir Köse as Otacı
- Mert Öğüt as Pars

== Episodes 04 ==
| Season | Episodes | Originally released | | |
| Season | Episodes | First released | Last released | Network |
|---|---|---|---|---|
| 1 | 28 | November 23, 2021 | September 15, 2022 | atv |
