= İdris Nebi Taşkan =

Turkish actor and basketball player

- Born: 18 August 1997 (age 28); Beyoğlu, Istanbul, Turkey
- Citizenship: Turkish
- Occupation: Actor
- Years active: 2014–present
- Known for: Fazilet Hanım ve Kızları
- Height: 1.90 m (6 ft 3 in)
- Relatives: Serpil Özsavanner

İdris Nebi Taşkan (born 18 August 1997) is a Turkish actor and basketball player.

== Filmography ==
Film
Year	Title	Role	Notes
2019	Özgür Dünya	Tolga	

TV series
Year	Title	Role	Notes
2014	Muhteşem Yüzyıl		Guest role
2015–2016	Poyraz Karayel		Guest role
2016	Arkadaşlar İyidir	Eren Kahraman	Leading role
2017–2018	Fazilet Hanım ve Kızları	Yasin Demirkol	Leading role
2019	Zalim İstanbul	Civan Yılmaz	Leading role
2021	Baht Oyunu	Rüzgar Akcan	Leading role
2022	Gizli Saklı	Tufan	Supporting role
2023–	Al Sancak	Aras Güneri	Supporting role

Streaming series and films
Year	Title	Role	Notes
2021	Ölüm Zamanı	Tarık	Exxen
