= Gülçin Santırcıoğlu =

Turkish actress

- Born: July 25, 1977 (age 48); İzmir, Turkey
- Occupation: Actress
- Years active: 2004–present
- Spouse: İbrahim Utku Başyazıcı

Gülçin Santırcıoğlu (born July 25, 1977) is a Turkish actress.

== Biography ==
She was born on 25 July 1977 in İzmir. She took opera lessons at Dokuz Eylül University Conservatory School of Performing Arts. Aside from her acting career, she worked as a soloist for various bands and taught singing courses at Ruhi Su Culture and Arts Foundation. The first movie she appeared in was Türev. Released in 2005, it won the Best Film award at the Antalya Golden Orange Film Festival. With her role as Süreyya in this movie, she was awarded as the Most Promising Actress at the 13th ÇASOD Awards. Her breakthrough came through her role in the hit period series Elveda Rumeli, in which she portrayed the character of Hatice. In 2007, she was cast alongside Nejat İşler, Saadet Aksoy and Ufuk Bayraktar in Yumurta, the first installment of a trilogy directed by Semih Kaplanoğlu which later won many national and international awards. In 2008, she shared the leading role with Kaan Keskin in the movie İki Çizgi, which was screened at 30 national and international film festivals, including the 65th Venice Film Festival and the 45th Antalya Golden Orange Film Festival. Santırcıoğlu then continued her career by appearing in various TV productions. In 2012, she voiced the song "Ala Gözlerini Sevdiğim Dilber" for Badem band's studio album Badem ve Konukları. In 2013, she was among the judging panel of the Rotterdam Golden Tulip Film Festival. She was cast in surreal period comedy "Osmanlı Tokadı". In recent years, Santırcıoğlu has been mainly known for her roles in series such as Kara Ekmek, Oyunbozan and Hercai.

== Filmography ==
=== Film ===
Film
Year	Title	Role	Notes
2021	Stuck Apart	Vildan	Supporting role
2015	Yeni Hayat	Şirin	Leading role
2014	Kırımlı	Anette	Supporting role
2010	Memlekette Demokrasi Var (Yüz Bin Kibrit)	Huriye	Leading role
2009	Ev	Tülin	Leading role
2008	İki Çizgi	Selin	Leading role
2007	Yumurta	Gül	Supporting role
2005	Türev	Süreyya	Leading role

=== Television ===
Television
Year	Title	Role	Notes
2022-2025	Yalı Çapkını	İfakat	Supporting role
2019–2021	Hercai	Sultan Aslanbey	Leading role
2018	Nefes Nefese	Sultan Akmeşe	Supporting role
2016	Diriliş: Ertuğrul	Çolpan Hatun/Ekaterina	(season 3)
2016	Oyunbozan	Mine	Leading role
2015	Kara Ekmek	Pervin	Leading role
2013–2014	Osmanlı Tokadı	Asuman	Supporting role
2011–2012	Bir Çocuk Sevdim	Sebahat	Supporting role
2010	Doktorlar	Tuba Aygün	Supporting role
2010	Sensiz Yaşayamam	Şahika	Leading role
2007–2009	Elveda Rumeli	Hatice	Leading role
2006	Gülpare	Neslihan Güldemir	Supporting role
2005	Aynalar	Dilek	Supporting role

== Awards ==
- 2006: 13th ÇASOD "Best Actors" Awards - Most Promising Actress (Türev)
