= Mehmet Erdem =

Turkish musician

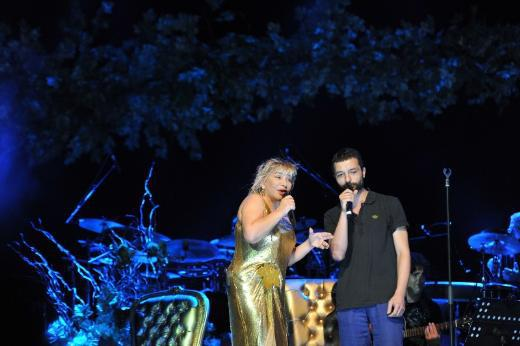
- Erdem performing with Sezen Aksu at Cemil Topuzlu Open-Air Theatre, 2012

Background information
- Born: 31 December 1978 (age 46); Manisa, Turkey
- Genres: Pop
- Occupation: Singer-songwriter
- Instrument(s): Clarinet, bağlama, mandolin, oud, guitar, cümbüş
- Years active: 1999–present
- Labels: Sony
- Spouse: Vildan Atasever (m. 2021)
- Website: mehmeterdemmusic.com

Mehmet Erdem (born 31 December 1978) is a Turkish musician and singer-songwriter. He is best known for song "Herkes Aynı Hayatta".

== Life and career ==
Mehmet Erdem was born in 1978 in Manisa. His family is originally from Arapgir. He studied at the İzmir Science High School and later graduated from Boğaziçi University with a degree in mechanical engineering. His father was a clarinetist, and his maternal uncle played bağlama and this encouraged him to become a musician. He first played mandolin at the age of 5. He later started playing bağlama and cümbüş. While at high school, he joined several bands both as a musician and a vocalist.

In 1997, he moved to Istanbul to continue his studies and worked as a musician in different places. In 1999, he joined the Kardeş Türküler band and started a professional career. He then worked as a crew member during the production process for the studio albums of various artists. At the same time, he continued to learn oud, cümbüş, guitar, and bağlama from prominent musicians. Erdem also worked as a composer on the soundtrack of a number of movies and TV series. In 2009, for his score to the film Deli Deli Olma, starring Tarık Akan and Şerif Sezer, he won the Golden Orange award for Best Original Score. Aside from his career as a musician, he has made guest appearances in TV series and movies such as Leyla ile Mecnun, Kuzey Güney, Behzat Ç. Bir Ankara Polisiyesi and Deliha 2.

In October 2015, Erdem was sentenced to 10 months in prison for "using drugs" according to the decision of the Istanbul 19th High Criminal Court. He was acquitted of "establishing, managing and being a member of a drug ring". The court postponed the sentence as the prison sentence was less than a year.

== Discography ==
=== Albums ===
- Herkes Aynı Hayatta (2012)
- Hiç Konuşmadan (2013)
- Hepsi Benim Yüzünden (2016)
- Neden Böyleyiz (2018)
- Bir Şarkı Vardı Ya (2022)

=== Singles ===
- "Allah'tan Kork" (with Aşkın Nur Yengi) (2019)
- "Deliler" (Yeni Türkü Zamansız) (2022)
- "Turnaların Göçü" (Musa Eroğlu ile Bir Asır 2) (2022)

=== Soundtracks ===
- Polis - (2006)
- Dol - (2007)
- Sınıf - (2008)
- İş Arıyoruz - (2008)
- Deli Deli Olma - (2009)
- Sizi Seviyorum - (2009)
- Memleket Meselesi - (2010)
- Avrupa Avrupa - (2011)
- Leyla ile Mecnun - (2011)
- Vücut - (2011)
- Çalgı Çengi - (2011)
- Kalbim Seni Seçti - (2011)
- Aşk Kırmızı - (2013)
- Sen Aydınlatırsın Geceyi - (2013)
- Cenaze İşleri - (2017)

== Awards ==
Yıl	Ödül veren organizasyon	Kategori
2009	International Antalya Golden Orange Film Festival	Best Original Score (Deli Deli Olma)
2013	Ege University 2nd Media Awards	Best Debut by an Artist
2013	1st Turkey Music Awards	Best Debut an Artist
2013	3rd Pal Fm Music Awards	Best Debut by a Male Artist
2013	10th Radyo Boğaziçi Music Awards	Best Debut
2013	MGD 19th Golden Objective Awards	Best Debut by an Artist
2016	13th Radyo Boğaziçi Music Awards	Best Male Pop Music Artist
