= Mine Teber =

Turkish Cypriot actress (born 1961)

- Born: Mine Şenhuy Teber; 29 July 1961 (age 64); Cyprus
- Occupation: Actress
- Years active: 1989–present

Mine Şenhuy Teber (born 29 July 1961) is a Turkish Cypriot actress. She currently resides in both Istanbul, Turkey and Girne, Northern Cyprus.

== Filmography ==
=== Television ===
Year	Title	Role	Notes
2025	Cihangir Cumhuriyeti		
2024	Yalı Çapkını	Binnaz	
2021-2022	Kanunsuz Topraklar	Fatma	
2019–2020	Kalk Gidelim	Aynur Pamuk	
2016	Kertenkele: Yeniden Doğuş		
2016	İstanbul Sokakları		
2009–2011	Geniş Aile	Muazzez	
2008	Cennetin Çocukları	Gülseren	
2007	Sessiz Gemiler	Hasene	
2006	Gönül	Terbiye	
2003	Hayat Bilgisi	Gülşen	
2003	Hadi Uç Bakalım	Efsane	
2002	Kısa Devre		
1993	Yazlıkçılar	Nalan	
1989–2002	Bizimkiler	Gülsüm	

=== Film ===
Year	Title	Role	Notes
2019	Geniş Aile Komşu Kızı		
2017	Ayla: The Daughter of War	Nevsal	
