= Hilmi Cem İntepe =

Turkish actor

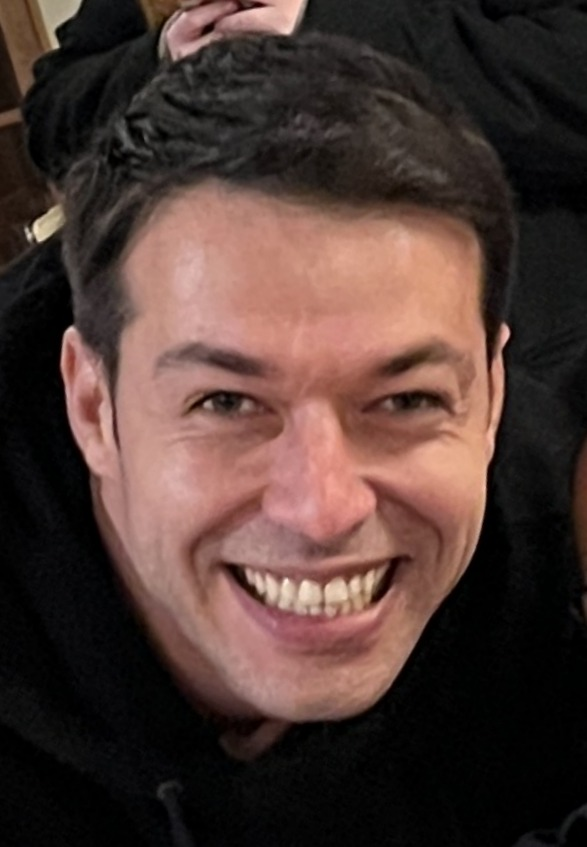
- Born: 19 May 1992 (age 34); Muğla, Turkey
- Occupation: Actor
- Years active: 2013–present

Hilmi Cem İntepe (born 19 May 1992) is a Turkish actor.

== Life and career ==
Hilmi Cem İntepe was born in 1992 in Menteşe, Muğla. He lived in Bodrum until the age of 18. At the age of 17, he started learning Latin dance and won a few local competitions. He made his debut on television as a dancer with Yetenek Sizsiniz Türkiye, the Turkish version of Got Talent. He rose to fame upon winning the 2013 season of Survivor: Ünlüler vs. Gönüllüler.

He made his debut as an actor with a supporting role on historical series Muhteşem Yüzyıl as Yavuz. He continued his career with a recurring role in Çalıkuşu based from classic novel. In 2014, he had his cinematic debut and appeared in two movies: Stajyer Mafya and Çılgın Dersane 4: Ada.

In 2016, he had his first leading role with the youth series Bodrum Masalı and sport series "Tek Yürek". He played in mini history series "Ya İstiklal Ya Ölüm".

In 2018, he portrayed aviation engineer and fighter pilot Vecihi Hürkuş in the historical drama movie Hürkuş: Göklerdeki Kahraman. In 2024, he had leading role in avivation series Hür.

== Filmography ==
=== Steaming series ===
| Year | Title | Role | Notes |
|---|---|---|---|
| 2020 | Ya İstiklal Ya Ölüm | Galip | Leading role |
| 2021 | Yeşilçam | Yusuf | Supporting role |
| 2023 | Hür | Gökhan Avcı | Leading role |

=== TV series ===
| Year | Title | Role | Notes |
|---|---|---|---|
| 2013 | Muhteşem Yüzyıl | Yavuz | |
| 2013 | Çalıkuşu | Ahmet Somers Yusuf | |
| 2016–2017 | Bodrum Masalı | Kelebek | Leading role |
| 2019 | Tek Yürek | Yiğit Demir Saruhan | Leading role |
| 2020 | Maria ile Mustafa | Mustafa | Leading role |
| 2023 | Tetikçinin Oğlu | Yiğit | Guest appearance |
| 2023 | Altın Kafes | Serhat Gediz | Guest appearance |
| 2026– | Mehmed: Fetihler Sultanı | Has Murad Pasha | |

=== Film ===
| Year | Title | Role | Notes |
|---|---|---|---|
| 2014 | Stajyer Mafya | Birol | Leading role |
| 2014 | Çılgın Dersane 4: Ada | Salto | |
| 2018 | Hürkuş: Göklerdeki Kahraman | Vecihi Hürkuş | Leading role |
| 2023 | Sevda Mecburi İstikamet | Genco | Guest appearance |

=== Contests ===
| Year | Title | Notes | Notes |
|---|---|---|---|
| 2013 | Survivor: Ünlüler vs. Gönüllüler | Himself | first place |
| 2015 | Survivor All Star | Himself | third place |
| 2018 | Survivor: Ünlüler vs. Gönüllüler | Himself | fourth place |
