= Piano Girl =

- Theatrical poster
- Directed by: Murat Saraçoğlu
- Written by: Sevim Hazer Ünsal
- Produced by: Tolga Aydın
- Starring: Tarık Akan; Şerif Sezer; Zuhal Topal
- Cinematography: Mustafa Kuşcu
- Edited by: Mustafa Preşeva
- Music by: Özgün Akgül; Mehmet Erdem
- Production company: Aydin Film
- Distributed by: Pinema
- Release date: April 17, 2009
- Running time: 95 minutes
- Country: Turkey
- Language: Turkish
- Box office: $614,899

Piano Girl (Turkish: Deli Deli Olma) is a 2009 Turkish comedy-drama film, directed by Murat Saraçoğlu, starring Tarık Akan and Şerif Sezer as two elderly people forced to question their histories and reveal their big secrets. The film, which went on nationwide general release across Turkey on April 17, 2009, was the opening film at the Sinema Burada Film Festival in İzmir, Turkey, and has since been screened in competition at a number of other film festivals, including the 46th Antalya Golden Orange Film Festival, where, according to Terry Richardson, writing for Today's Zaman, the rapt audience gave it a standing ovation.

The defunct Today's Zaman mistakenly stated that both Mishka and Popuch were "Molokan". Mihska was the last Russian and Malakan, and Popuch was Turkish Muslim.

== Plot ==
After the Russo-Turkish War of 1877–1878, Russia acquired part of eastern Anatolia, including Kars Oblast. To quickly populate the area with Russians, undesirable heretics, Spiritual Christians from Russia were given incentives (more land, military exemption, no taxes) to resettle in Kars Oblast in eastern Anatolia. These colonists were called malakan in Turkish, an umbrella term for any Russian settler in the Caucasus.

Among the resettled families is Mişka's. Mishka is Russian diminutive "little Micheal". They operated a water-powered grain mill along a river. Mişka (Tarik Akan) grows old, buries his brother, and now operates the only mill in the village. He cannot compete with new electric mills. He tries to sell apples to pay his bills.

In the meantime, the cranky old woman of the village, Popuç (Şerif Sezer), hates Mişka and does not want him in the village. She owns the store to which poor Mişka owes money. Dreamy flashbacks reveal that Mişka and Popuç fell in love in their youth and his Christian parents forbid him to marry outside their faith. The young Mişka and Popuç are played by the actual children of the parent actors.

Popuç lives with her son Semistan (Levent Tülek), daughter-in-law Figan (Zuhal Topal) and three grandchildren. However, the smallest and most wayward of her granddaughters, Alma, is musically talented and befriends the elder Mişka who teaches her on his old piano, and pays for her education at the Kars music academy. Alma will help two elderly people question their histories and reveal their big secrets.

When Mişka dies, Popuç with a change of heart, intervenes because she is the only Muslim who knows how to properly bury a Christian Malakan.

== Cast ==
- Tarık Akan as Mişka
- Şerif Sezer as Popuç
- Zuhal Topal as Figan
- Levent Tülek as Şemsitan
- Korel Cezayirli as Metin Öğretmen
- Murat Aydın as Fezo
- Ozan Erdoğan as Tavşan
- Muhammet Cangören as Allahyar
- Levent Uzunbilek as Mirza
- İsrafil Parlak as Adıbeş
- Havin Funda Saç as Esme

== Release ==
=== General release ===
The film opened in 133 screens across Turkey on April 17, 2009 at number seven in the Turkish box office chart with an opening weekend gross of $99,761.

=== Festival screenings ===
- 2009
  - Sinema Burada Film Festival
  - 46th Antalya Golden Orange Film Festival
  - 4th Bursa International Silk Road Film Festival
- 2010
  - 21st Ankara International Film Festival

== Reception ==
=== Box office ===
The film reached number five in the Turkish box office chart and has made a total gross of $614,899.

=== Reviews ===
Terry Richardson, writing for Today's Zaman, describes the comic drama as, Entertaining if melodramatic.

Some reviewers noted there was little information about the Malakan people.

== See also ==
- 2009 in film
- Turkish films of 2009
