= Ahmet Tansu Taşanlar =

Turkish actor (born 1984)

- Born: 31 May 1984 (age 42); Ankara, Turkey
- Education: Selçuk University State Conservatory
- Occupation: Actor
- Years active: 2008–present
- Spouse: Oya Unustası (m. 2021)

Ahmet Tansu Taşanlar (born 1984) is a Turkish actor.

== Life and career ==
Tansu Taşanlar was born on 31 May 1984 in Ankara. He is a graduate of Selçuk University State Conservatory with a degree in theatre studies. He briefly worked at the Bursa and Ankara State Theatres and made his television debut in 2008 with a role in the series Küçük Kadınlar. He simultaneously continued his career on stage and appeared in various plays. He later had a minor role in the historical drama Muhteşem Yüzyıl before appearing in supporting roles in the series Kara Para Aşk and Vatanım Sensin. He was further recognized with his role as Nazım in the series Çukur and rose to prominence after being cast in a leading role in the series Hercai.

== Filmography ==
Credits
Year	Title	Role	Notes
2008	Akasya Durağı	Customer	TV series
2008–2010	Küçük Kadınlar	Ceyhun	TV series
2009	Bir Bulut Olsam	Salih	TV series
2009	Hırçın Kız Kadife	Süleyman	TV film
2011	Muhteşem Yüzyıl	Sculptor Antuan	TV series
2011	Yalancı Bahar	Aras	TV series
2011	İzmir Çetesi	Rıfat	TV series
2012	Veda	Sinan	TV series
2013	Küçük Kıyamet	Guest appearance	TV series
2014	Kara Para Aşk	Arda Çakır	TV series
2015	Analar ve Anneler	Halil	TV series
2015	Hatırlar Gönül	Bahadır	TV series
2016–2017	Vatanım Sensin	Hasan Basri	TV series
2017	Kara Yazı	Kadir	TV series
2017–2018	Çukur	Nazım	TV series
2018–2019	Mehmetçik Kut'ül Amare	Zafir	TV series
2019	Halka	Terzi	TV series
2019–2021	Hercai	Azat Şadoğlu	TV series
2021	Yalancılar ve Mumları	Demir Ünal	TV series
2024	Yalan	Yusuf Behlül Taşkıran	TV series
