= Oya Unustası =

Turkish actress and model

- Born: 31 March 1988 (age 37); Istanbul, Turkey
- Education: Mimar Sinan Fine Arts University, Flute Department
- Occupations: Actress, model
- Years active: 2011–present
- Spouse: Ahmet Tansu Taşanlar (m. 2021)
- Awards: Spain Television Awards; Golden Star

Oya Unustası (born 31 March 1988) is a Turkish actress and model. She is known for her starring role as Zeliş Gıpgıp in Kalbim Ege'de Kaldı (2015) and has since been in supporting roles in several series. She was one of the top 20 in the 2013 Miss Turkey competition.

== Life and career ==
Oya Unustası was born in Istanbul, Turkey. Her paternal side of the family originally migrated from Bulgaria, and her maternal side migrated from Thessaloniki. Her parents initially settled in Buca, Izmir before moving to Istanbul. She has two older sisters and an older brother. She studied at the Flute Department of Mimar Sinan Fine Arts University and trained under the Turkish actress Ayla Algan. She preferred acting to music.

Her first film was Losers' Club in 2010. She has since starred in Masum Değiliz and the television series Beyaz Karanfil, Sevdaluk, İzmir Çetesi and Diriliş: Ertuğrul, in the latter playing the role of Sügay Hatun. In 2017 she acted the part of Olivia in the play Çok Satanlar. She currently stars in Hercai, a series broadcast on ATV.

== Personal life ==
Unustası is married to fellow actor Ahmet Tansu Taşanlar.

== Theatre ==
Some of her notable theatre plays:

- 2017— Çok Satanlar (Olivia)

== Filmography ==
Year	Title	Role
Films
2011	Losers' Club	Bardaki Kiz
Television
2011	İzmir Çetesi	Rezzan
2013	Sevdaluk	Gülben Gedik
2014	Beyaz Karanfil	Nilüfer
2015	Kalbim Ege'de Kaldı	Zeliş Gıpgıp
2018	Diriliş: Ertuğrul	Sügay Hatun
2018	Masum Değiliz	Ceyda
2019–2021	Hercai	Gönül Aslanbey

== Awards and nominations ==
Awards
Year	Awards ceremony	Category	Project	Result	Ref.
2020	Golden Star	Best Supporting TV Actress	Hercai	Nominated	
2020	Spain Television Awards (PTE202)	Best Major Actress	Hercai	Won	
