= Tansu Okandan =

Turkish diplomat (1942–2019)

M. Tansu Okandan

Turkey Ambassador to Australia
- In office 1 October 2001 – 5 January 2006
- President: Ahmet Necdet Sezer
- Preceded by: Umut Arık
- Succeeded by: Murat Ersavcı

Turkey Ambassador to Belarus
- In office 10 April 1992 – 28 February 1998
- President: Turgut Özal (1992–1993) Süleyman Demirel
- Preceded by: Office established
- Succeeded by: Şule Soysal

Personal details
- Born: 17 July 1942 Istanbul, Turkey
- Died: 5 January 2019 (aged 76) Ankara, Turkey
- Education: Ankara University Faculty of Political Sciences

Mehmet Tansu Okandan (17 July 1942 – 5 January 2019) was a Turkish diplomat.

He graduated from Ankara University Faculty of Political Sciences in 1965. After the dissolution of the Soviet Union, he served as Turkey's first ambassador to Belarus in 1992–1998. He served as Turkey's ambassador to Australia from 2001 to 2006.

Apart from his ambassadorial duties, he served as the general director of bilateral political affairs at the Ministry of Foreign Affairs from 1998 to 2001.
