= Afra Saraçoğlu =

Turkish actress and model (born 1997)

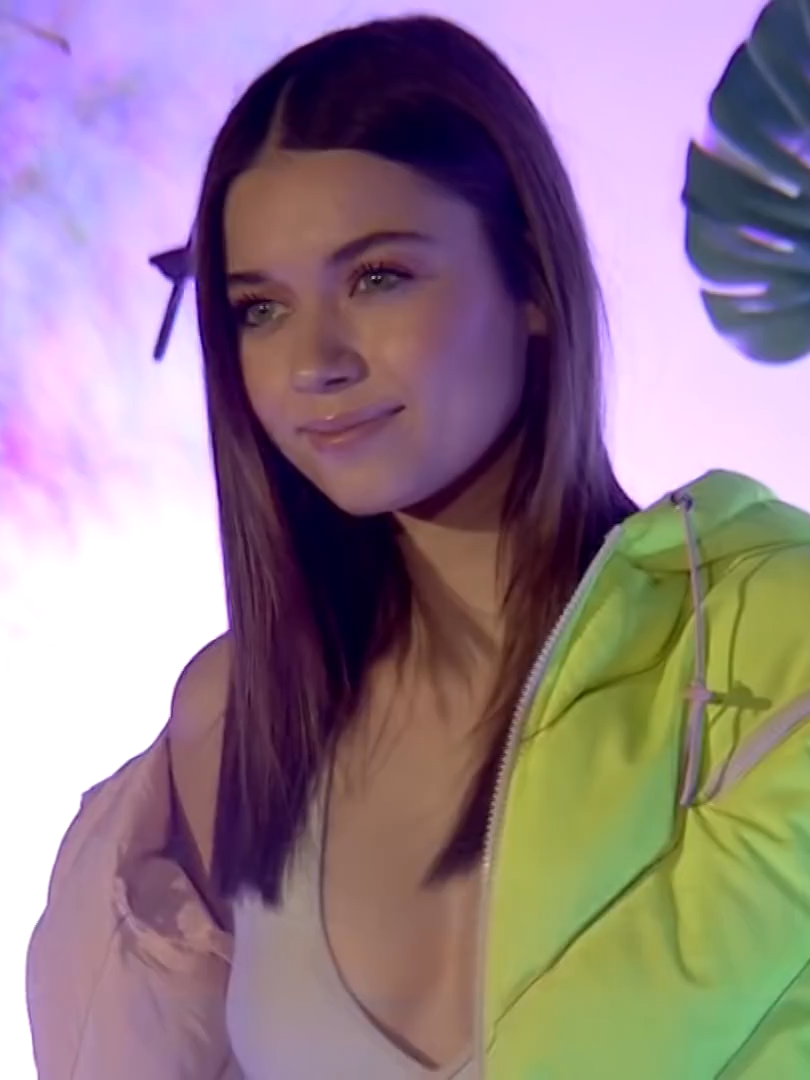
- Saraçoğlu in 2019
- Born: 2 December 1997 (age 28); Edremit, Balıkesir, Turkey
- Occupations: Actress; model; TV personality
- Years active: 2016–present

Afra Saraçoğlu (born 2 December 1997) is a Turkish actress and model. After she began her acting career in 2016, she gained fame for her role in the television series Mrs. Fazilet and Her Daughters (2017–18) for which she won a Golden Butterfly Award. Her starring role in the romance Yalı Çapkını (2022–25) helped her gain wider recognition. Saraçoğlu has also starred in other works and has been the face of several brands, including Pantene, Garnier, and Elidor.

== Early life ==
Afra Saraçoğlu was born on 2 December 1997 in Edremit district of Balıkesir. She completed her primary and secondary education in Antalya and while studying she took her first step into acting in 2016. After the Ottoman Empire collapsed, her family were Turkish immigrants from Thessaloniki and Crete.

== Career ==
After her mother sent a photo of her to Özcan Deniz, Afra was called for an audition and landed her first acting role in the film 2016 İkinci Şans. In the film, which starred Deniz and Nurgül Yeşilçay, Saraçoğlu played Yeşilçay's daughter. She then shared the lead role with Tolga Sarıtaş in the film Kötü Çocuk (2017). Saraçoğlu gained fame through her starring role as Ece in the television series Fazilet Hanım ve Kızları, which aired between 2017 and 2018.

Continuing her film career, she starred in the films İyi Oyun and Aşk Bu Mu?, both in 2018. She also appeared in television series the following years such as Kardeş Çocukları (2019), Öğretmen (2020) and the streaming series Yeşilçam (2021). In 2021, she appeared in the theater play Bir Barda Bir Gece with Nurgül Yeşilçay. From 2022 to 2025, she starred as Seyran in the series Yalı Çapkını, which aired on Star TV.

== Endorsement ==
In 2018, Saraçoğlu started endorsing Pantene and Hummel. In 2021 and 2022, she became the model of the ice cream brand Cornetto and hair care brand Elidor, headlining many campaigns. In 2023, Garnier and DeFacto selected her as its new advertising face. The food and beverage manufacturer Ülker selected her as its new model in 2024. In 2025, she starred in a Go Türkiye miniseries alongside Engin Akyurek titled Istanbul My Love, to promote tourism in Turkey. She also teamed up with Ysl Beauty to introduce "LIBRE L’Eau Nue", the new interpretation of the LIBRE perfume line.

== Filmography ==
Web series
Year	Title	Role	Notes
2021	Yeşilçam	Tülin Saygı	Leading role
TV series
Year	Title	Role	Notes
2017–2018	Mrs. Fazilet and Her Daughters	Ece Çamkıran	Leading role
2019	Kardeş Çocukları	Hayat Çetin	Leading role
2020	Öğretmen	Gizem Bozkurt	Leading role
2022–2025	Yalı Çapkını	Seyran Korhan	Leading role
2026	A.B.İ.	Çağla Öncü	Leading role
Film
Year	Title	Role	Notes
2016	İkinci Şans	Çiçek	Supporting role
2017	Kötü Çocuk	Kayla	Leading role
2018	İyi Oyun	Ada	Leading role
2018	Aşk Bu Mu?	Gülüm	Leading role
Music videos
Year	Name	role	Notes
2021	Yalın - Yaz Gülü		

== Awards ==
- Turkey Youth Awards: Best Supporting Actress
- 45th Golden Butterfly Awards: Shining Star Award
- Elle Style Awards: Star of the Year
- GQ Men Of The Year 2024: Most Dazzling Achievement
