= Akın Akınözü =

Turkish actor (born 1990)

- Born: Akın Süreyya Akınözü; 22 September 1990 (age 36); Ankara, Turkey
- Occupations: Actor Education =Graduated in BS Applied Mathematics from University of California,Berkeley
- Years active: 2015–present
- Notable work: Hercai

Akın Süreyya Akınözü (born 22 September 1990) is a Turkish actor who has played roles in many Turkish Tv series. He is especially known for playing Miran Aslanbey in the Turkish TV series Hercai. He is the son of the actress Özlem Akınözü.

== Early life ==
Akın Süreyya Akınözü was born on 22 September 1990, in Ankara, Turkey and is the only child of actress Özlem Akınözü and restaurant owner Tamer Akınözü. His maternal grandfather, Süreyya Arın was one of the first TV presenters on TRT (Turkish Radio and Television). His great-uncle Süha Arın is known as "The Father of Turkish Documentaries". Akınözü attended Ankara TED High School and subsequently studied mathematics at the University of California, Berkeley, where he lived for around 6 years before deciding to become an actor.

== Career ==
He first appeared in Turkish movie Azrail as Gaffur then did many Turkish Tv series including famous Turkish Tv series Muhteşem Yüzyıl: Kösem. Akınözü's performance as Miran in Hercai has earned him awards such as: "Best Actor in a Dramatic Series" (24th Golden Lens Awards of the Magazine Journalists Association 2019), and "Best Couple in a TV series" (Ayaklı Newspaper Awards 2020). He was also awarded the Spanish television station Nova Atresmedia's Premio Nova Mas's Best Male Actor in 2019 and Mister Nova 2019. In 2021, he shared the lead roles with Öykü Karayel and Sarp Apak in the Star TV drama "Kaderimin Oyunu". Since then, he has played roles in many famous Turkish Tv series. Currently, he is playing the role of Timur in Turkish Tv series Veliaht.

== Filmography ==
TV series
Year	Title	Role	Notes
2015	Muhteşem Yüzyıl: Kösem	İvan Ali	Supporting role
2016	Arkadaşlar İyidir	Yunus Çağlayan	Leading role
2017–2018	Aslan Ailem	Murat Aslan	Leading role
2017–2018	Payitaht: Abdülhamid	Ömer	Supporting role
2019–2021	Hercai	Miran Şadoğlu	Leading role
2021–2022	Kaderimin Oyunu	Cemal Kaya	Leading role
2022–2023	Tuzak	Umut Yörükoğlu / Çınar Yılmaz	Leading role
2024	Yaban Çiçekleri	Kılıç Tütüncü	Leading role
2025	Yalı Çapkını	Cihan Korhan	Guest
2025–2026	Veliaht	Timur	Leading role
2026–present	Aşk ve Taht	Alâeddin Keykûbad	Leading role

Film
Year	Title	Role	Notes
2014	Azrail	Gaffur	Supporting role
2024	Azrael	Mass	Leading role

== Awards and nominations ==
Year	Awards	Category	Nominated work	Result
2019	Premios Nova Mas and Mister Nova	Best Actor in a Drama Series	Hercai	Won
2019	Golden Objective Awards	Best Actor in a Drama Series	Hercai	Won
2020	Golden Butterfly Awards	Best Actor in a Drama Series	Hercai	Nominated
2020	Golden Butterfly Awards	Best TV Couple (Reyyan & Miran)	Hercai	Nominated
