= Ebru Şahin =

Turkish actress (born 1994)

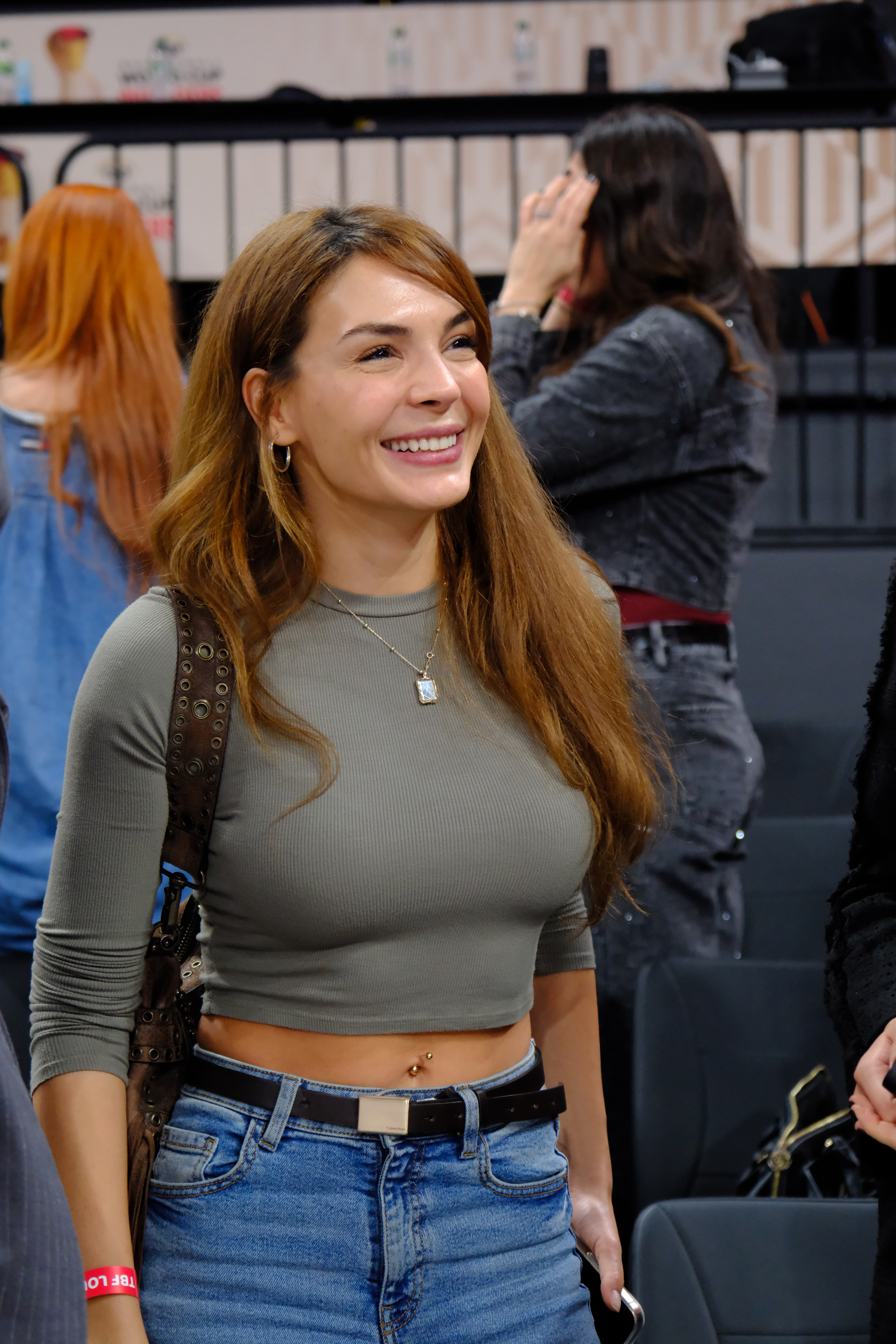
- Born: 18 May 1994 (age 32); Istanbul, Turkey
- Occupation: Actress
- Years active: 2016–present
- Spouse: Cedi Osman (m. 2022)

Ebru Şahin (born 18 May 1994) is a Turkish television actress and model. She made her cinematic debut with the movie Kan Parası and had a brief role in the TV show İstanbullu Gelin. She rose to prominence with her role as Reyyan Şadoğlu on the Turkish drama Hercai.

== Career ==
Şahin is a graduate of Istanbul University with a degree in Sports Sciences, after which she started taking acting lessons. She made her cinematic debut in 2016 with a role in the movie Kan Parası. She made her television debut in 2017 with a supporting role in the military series Savaşçı. After being cast in other supporting roles in İstanbullu Gelin and Yasak Elma between 2017–2018, she had her first leading role in the TV series Hercai as Reyyan Şadoğlu. For this role, she was awarded a Golden Butterfly Award as Best Actress in 2020. Ebru Şahin and Cedi Osman got married in 2022.

== Filmography ==
=== Television ===
Television
Year	Title	Role	Notes	Channel
2017	Savaşçı	Didem	Supporting role	FOX
2017–2018	İstanbullu Gelin	Burcu Selimer	Supporting role	Star TV
2018	Yasak Elma	Hira	Supporting role	FOX
2019–2021	Hercai	Reyyan Şadoğlu	Leading role	atv
2021–2022	Destan	Akkız	Leading role	atv
2023	Yüz Yıllık Mucize	Harika Yılmaz	Leading role	Star TV
2024	Gizli Bahçe	Nazlı Orman	Leading role	NOW
Year	Title	Role	Notes	Platform
2024	Tam Bir Centilmen	Nehir	Leading role	Netflix
Film
Year	Title	Role	Notes	
2016	Kan Parası		Supporting role	
2017	Babam	Nilüfer	Supporting role	
2019	Şuursuz Aşk	Menekşe	Leading role	

== Awards and nominations ==
Year	Awards	Category	Nominated work	Result
2019	Leading Brand Awards	Best Actress of the Year	Hercai	Won
2020	Premios Nova Mas and Mister Nova	Best Actress in a Drama Series	Hercai	Won
2020	Golden Butterfly Awards	Best Actress of the Year	Hercai	Won
2020	Golden Butterfly Awards	Rising Star	Hercai	Won
2020	3rd International Izmir Film Festival Golden Artemis Awards	Best Actress	Hercai	Nominated
2020	Golden Palm Awards	Best TV Series Actress	Hercai	Won
2020	Golden Brand Awards	Best TV Actress	Hercai	Won
2020	Premios Telenovelas España	Best Drama Character (Reyyan)	Hercai	Won
2020	Turkey's Youth Awards	Best TV Actress	Hercai	Won
2020	6th "Ayaklı" Newspaper Awards	Best Series Couple (Reyyan & Miran)	Hercai	Won
2020	Premios Nova Mas and Mister Nova	6th "Ayaklı" Newspaper Awards Best Series Couple (Reyyan & Miran)	Hercai	Won
2020	Golden Butterfly Awards	Best TV Couple (Reyyan & Miran)	Hercai	Nominated
2021	Turkish Drama Channels Awards	Best Actress of the Year	Hercai	Won
2021	Turkish Drama Channels Awards	Best TV Couple (Reyyan & Miran)	Hercai	Won
2022	Turkey Women's Summit Awards	Best TV Series Actress	Destan	Won
