= Proton Theatre =

- Company type: Hungarian independent theatre company
- Founded: 2009 in Budapest, Hungary
- Founders: Kornél Mundruczó, artistic director and Dóra Büki, theatre producer
- Website: protontheatre.hu

Proton Theatre is an independent company based in Hungary. It was founded in 2009 and is operating according to the production concept shaped by Kornél Mundruczó (film and theatre director) and Dóra Büki (theatre producer). The virtual artistic group is organized around the director's independent productions.

== History ==
Mundruczó has worked in the theatre field since 2003. During his career, he has developed a unique working method, already put to use in 2007 with his piece Frankenstein-project at Bárka Theatre. This highly acclaimed work was to be the Proton Theatre's founding production. It convinced him of the need for a “base”, where he could work freely with his own company. Theatre producer Dóra Büki devised the organisation's operational structure to ensure the long runs of their performances. Thus, in 2009, the Proton Theatre was born.

Besides preserving maximum artistic freedom, their goal is to provide a professional framework for their independently produced theatre plays and projects.

Chiefly, their performances are realized as international co-productions, and their frequent collaborators include the Vienna Festival; HAU Hebbel am Ufer, Berlin; Kunstenfestivaldesarts, Brussels; Trafó House of Contemporary Arts, Budapest; and HELLERAU, Dresden. Besides productions directed by the artistic leader – namely, The Ice (2006), Frankenstein-project (2007), Hard to be a God (2010), Disgrace (2012), Dementia (2013), Winterreise (2015), Imitation of life (2016), The Raft of the Medusa (2018) and Evolution (2019) – they wish to provide space for the realisation of the company members’ ideas. In this spirit, the following performances were created: Last (2014), directed by Roland Rába, 1 link (2015), directed by Gergely Bánki, and Finding Quincy by János Szemenyei.

Their co-producers are among the most prestigious festivals and theatres. On their first international co-production, Hard to be a God, the main co-producer was Kunstenfestivaldesarts, on their second, Disgrace, the Vienna Festival, on their third, Dementia, HAU Hebbel am Ufer, and Vienna Festival again on their fourth. Their constant partner in Hungary is Trafó House of Contemporary Arts.

Proton Theatre performances have toured more than 110 festivals over the years – from Festival d’Avignon and the Adelaide Festival to the Singapore International Festival of Arts, the Seoul Bo:m Festival, and the Zürcher Theater Spektakel. In 2017 their performance Imitation of life was nominated for the Faust Award for Mundruczó's outstanding directorial achievement. It was the first time in the history of this award that a non-German theatre was nominated.

== Productions ==
=== The Seven Deadly Sins/Motherland ===
Kornél Mundruczó has paired his production of The Seven Deadly Sins with the drama Motherland, which explores the subjects of capitalist exploitation and the exercise of power in a family of the present day.

Director	Kornél Mundruczó
Premiere	16 July 2020 Theater Freiburg, Freiburg
Co-production with	Theater Freiburg, Germany
Author	Bertolt Brecht/Kata Wéber

=== Evolution ===
Based on György Ligeti's Requiem the world premier of Kornél Mundruczó and Proton Theatre lies on the boundary of concert and theatre and analyses the theme of repetition.

Director	Kornél Mundruczó
Premiere	5 September 2019 Ruhrtriennale, Bochum
Co-production with	Ruhrtriennale, Bochum, Germany
Author	György Ligeti, Kata Wéber

Festival invitations

- Ruhrtriennale 2019. Bochum, Germany

=== The Raft of the Medusa ===
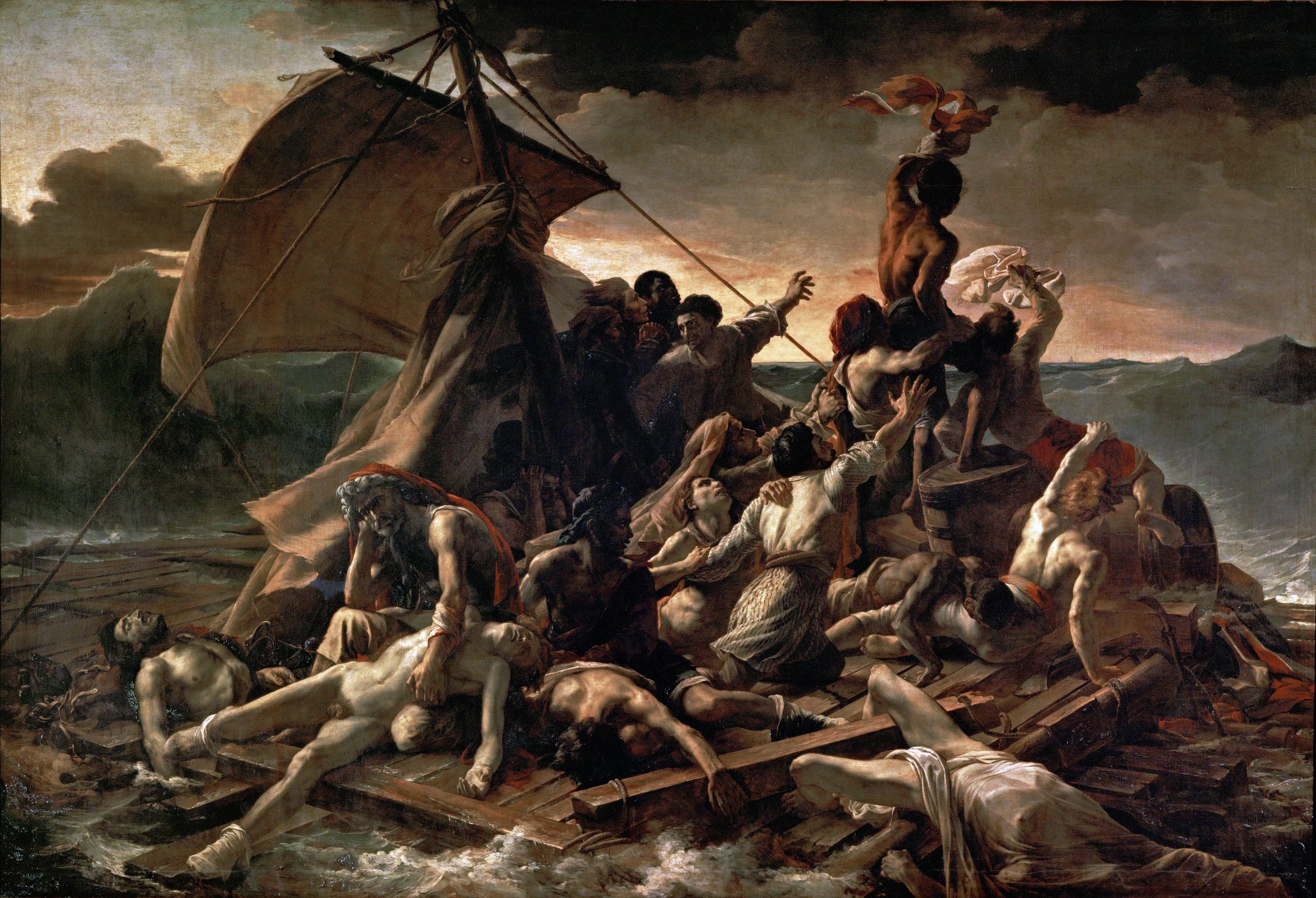
The Hans Werner Henze Oratorio was inspired by a painting of the same title by Théodore Géricault.

The Raft of the Medusa, an oratory by Hans Werner Henze, was inspired by Théodore Géricault's famous painting by the same name from 1819. Directed by Kornél Mundruczó, this installation of the Proton Theatre aimed to tell the story of The Raft of the Medusa – one that is universally valid and spans different eras – from a unique perspective.

Director	Kornél Mundruczó
Premiere	31 August 2018 Ruhrtriennale, Bochum
Co-production with	Ruhrtriennale, Bochum, Germany
Author	Hans Werner Henze

Festival invitations

- Ruhrtriennale 2018. Bochum, Germany

=== Finding Quincy ===
Director	János Szemenyei
Premiere	16 December 2017 Madách Theatre, Budapest
Author	István Kormos, Gergely Bánki, János Szemenyei

=== Imitation of life ===
Director	Kornél Mundruczó
Premiere	27 April 2016 Trafó House of Contemporary Arts, Budapest (World premiere)
Co-production with	Vienna Festival, Austria; Theater Oberhausen, Germany; La Rose des Vents, Lille, France; Maillon, Théâtre de Strasbourg / Scène européenne, France; Trafó House of Contemporary Arts, Budapest, Hungary; Hebbel HAU Hebbel am Ufer, Berlin, Germany; HELLERAU - European Center for the Arts, Dresden, Germany; Wiesbaden Biennale, Germany
Author	Kata Wéber

Festival invitations

- Vienna Festival 2016. Vienna, Austria
- Theater Oberhausen 2016. Oberhausen, Germany
- Wiesbaden Biennale 2016. Wiesbaden, Germany
- HELLERAU - European Center for the Arts 2016. Dresden, Germany
- HAU Hebbel am Ufer 2016. Berlin, Germany
- NEXT Festival 2016. Lille, France
- Platonov Arts Festival 2017. Voronezh, Russia
- 17th National Theatre Festival 2017. Pécs, Hungary
- Festival Boulevard 2017. 's-Hertogenbosch, Netherlands
- Zürcher Theater Spektakel 2017. Zurich, Switzerland
- Baltic House Festival 2017. Saint Petersburg, Russia
- Sirenos Festival 2017. Vilnius, Lithuania
- Spring in Autumn 2017. Utrecht, The Netherlands
- Łaźnia Nowa Teatr 2017. Kraków, Poland
- TR Warszawa 2017. Warsaw, Poland
- dunaPart4 - Platform of Contemporary Hungarian Performing Arts 2017. Budapest, Hungary
- Lessingtage 2018. Thalia Theater, Hamburg, Germany
- MC93 Bobigny 2018. Bobigny, France
- Théâtre de Vidy 2018. Lausanne, Switzerland
- Maillon 2018. Strasbourg, France
- Alkantara Festival 2018. Lisbon, Portugal
- Athens Festival 2018. Athens, Greece
- Theaterfestival Basel 2018. Basel, Switzerland
- 26th International Festival Theatre 2018. Plzeň, Czech Republic
- CDN Orléans 2018. Orléans, France
- VIE Festival 2019. Bologna, Italy
- MESS International Theatre Festival 2019. Sarajevo, Bosnia and Herzegovina
- FIT Festival 2019. Lugano, Switzerland

Award

- Best scenery: Márton Ágh - Hungarian Theatre Critics' Association
- Best writing and dramaturgy: Kata Wéber and Soma Boronkay - 17th National Theatre Festival 2017. Pécs, Hungary
- Best scenery: Márton Ágh - 17th National Theatre Festival 2017. Pécs, Hungary
- Audience Award - Baltic House Festival 2017. Saint Petersburg, Russia

=== Winterreise ===
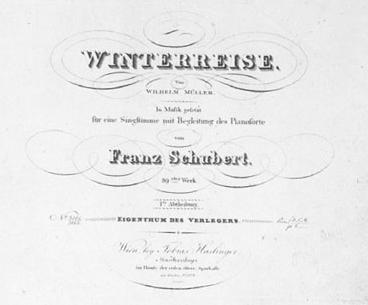
Cover of the 1st edition (1828)

Director	Kornél Mundruczó
Premiere	3 October 2015 Budapest Music Center
Co-production with	CAFe Budapest Contemporary Arts Festival; Danubia Orchestra Óbuda; Iván Fischer's Apartment Theatre (FILC)
Author	Franz Schubert, Hans Zender

Festival invitations

- "Fremd bin ich..." Classical Music Festival - Mousonturm 2017. Frankfurt am Main, Germany
- HAU Hebbel am Ufer 2017. Berlin, Germany
- HELLERAU - European Center for the Arts 2018. Dresden, Germany
- Wiener Festwochen 2018. Vienna, Austria
- Mittelfest 2018. Cividale del Friuli, Italy
- Maillon 2019. Strasbourg, France

=== 1 link ===
Since January 2019, the Katona József Theatre's "Sufni" (Shed) Studio has hosted the performance based on the award-winning cyber novel written under a pseudonym.

Director	Gergely Bánki
Premiere	25 May 2015 Trafó House of Contemporary Arts, Budapest (World premiere)
Co-production with	Trafó House of Contemporary Arts, Budapest, Hungary
Author	Jake Smiles

Festival invitations

- National Theatre of Pécs 2016. Pécs, Hungary

=== Last ===
Director	Roland Rába
Premiere	11 September 2014 Trafó House of Contemporary Arts, Budapest (World premiere)
Co-production with	Trafó House of Contemporary Arts, Budapest, Hungary
Author	Performance text created by Roland Rába based on the company's improvisations

Festival invitations

- National Theatre of Pécs 2015. Pécs, Hungary
- Jászai Mari Theatre 2016. Tatabánya, Hungary
- National Theatre of Szeged 2017. Szeged, Hungary

=== Dementia ===
Director	Kornél Mundruczó
Premiere	15 October 2013 Trafó House of Contemporary Arts, Budapest (World premiere)
Co-production with	HAU Hebbel am Ufer, Berlin, Germany; Théâtre National de Bordeaux en Aquitaine, France; HELLERAU - European Center for the Arts, Dresden, Germany; Trafó House of Contemporary Arts, Budapest, Hungary; Festival De Keuze/Rotterdamse Schouwburg, Hollandia; Noorderzon Performing Arts Festival, Groningen, Hollandia; SPIELART Festival, Munich, Germany; Festival Automne en Normandie, Rouen, France; Maria Matos Teatro Municipal, Lisbon, Portugal; Mousonturm, Frankfurt am Main, Germany; Kunstenfestivaldesarts, Brussels, Belgium
Author	Kornél Mundruczó, Kata Wéber

Festival invitations

- SPIELART Festival 2013. Munich, Germany
- Novart Festival 2013. Théâtre National de Bordeaux en Aquitaine, France
- HELLERAU - European Center for the Arts 2014. Dresden, Germany
- HAU Hebbel am Ufer 2014. Berlin, Germany
- Maria Matos Teatro Municipal 2014. Lisboa, Portugal
- Nová Dráma Festival 2014. Bratislava, Slovakia
- New Plays from Europe 2014. Mousonturm, Frankfurt am Main, Germany
- Noorderzon Performing Arts Festival 2014. Groningen, The Netherlands
- Festival De Keuze 2014. Rotterdamse Schouwburg, The Netherlands
- Baltic House Festival 2014. Saint Petersburg, Russia
- NET Festival 2014. Moscow, Russia
- Automne en Normandie 2014. Evreux, France
- NEXT Festival 2014. Lille, France
- Nervöse Systeme 2014. Schauspielhaus Zürich, Switzerland
- Lessingtage 2015. Thalia Theater, Hamburg, Germany
- dunaPart3 - Platform of Contemporary Hungarian Performing Arts 2015. Budapest, Hungary
- Singapore International Festival of Arts 2015. Singapore
- International Theatre Forum TEART 2016. Minsk, Belarus
- Theatre World Brno 2017. Czech Republic

Award

- Critics’ Award - Baltic House Festival 2014. Saint Petersburg, Russia

=== Disgrace ===
Director	Kornél Mundruczó
Premiere	17 May 2012 Vienna Festival, Vienna
Co-production with	Vienna Festival, Austria; Festival d’Avignon, France; KunstenFestivalDesArts, Brussels, Belgium; Trafó House of Contemporary Arts, Budapest, Hungary; Malta Festival, Poznan, Poland; HAU Hebbel am Ufer, Berlin, Germany; Romaeuropa Festival, Rome, Italy
Author	J.M. Coetzee

Festival invitations

- Vienna Festival 2012. Vienna, Austria
- KunstenFestivalDesArts 2012. Brussels, Belgium
- Malta Festival 2012. Poznan, Poland
- Festival d’Avignon 2012. France
- HAU Hebbel am Ufer 2012. Berlin, Germany
- Romaeuropa Festival 2012. Rome, Italy
- Hungarian Showcase 2013. Budapest, Hungary
- National Theatre of Pécs 2013. Pécs, Hungary
- 13th National Theatre Festival 2013. Pécs, Hungary
- Tampere Theatre Festival 2013. Finland
- Züricher Theater Spektakel 2013. Switzerland
- Maillon 2014. Strasbourg, France
- NEXT Festival 2015. Lille, France
- Mousonturm 2015. Frankfurt am Main, Germany
- 24th International Festival Theatre 2016. Plzeň, Czech Republic

Awards

- Best direction: Kornél Mundruczó - 13th National Theatre Festival 2013. Pécs, Hungary
- Best scenery: Márton Ágh - 13th National Theatre Festival 2013. Pécs, Hungary

=== Hard to be a God ===
Director	Kornél Mundruczó
Premiere	21 May 2010 Kunsten Festival des Arts, Brussels (World premiere)
Co-production with	Alkantara Festival, Lisbon, Portugal; Baltoscandal, Rakvere, Estonia; Culturgest, Lisbon, Portugal; KunstenFestivalDesArts, Brussels, Belgium; Rotterdamse Schouwburg, The Netherlands; Theater der Welt 2010, Essen, Germany; Théâtre National de Bordeaux en Aquitaine, France; Trafó House of Contemporary Arts, Budapest, Hungary
Author	Kornél Mundruczó, Yvette Bíró

Festival invitations

- KunstenFestivalDesArts 2010. Brussels, Belgium
- Alkantara Festival 2010. Lisbon, Portugal
- Theater der Welt 2010. Essen, Germany
- Festival de Keuze 2010. Rotterdamse Schouwburg, The Netherlands
- Novart Festival 2010. Théâtre National de Bordeaux en Aquitaine, France
- dunaPart2 - Platform of Contemporary Hungarian Performing Arts 2011. Budapest, Hungary
- POT Festival 2011. Tallinn, Estonia
- Vienna Festival 2011. Vienna, Austria
- Malta Festival 2011. Poznan, Poland
- La Batie – Festival de Geneve 2011. Geneva, Switzerland
- La Filature 2011. Mulhouse, France
- Politics in Independent Theatre - HELLERAU 2011. Dresden, Germany
- Adelaide Festival 2012. Adelaide, Australia
- MESS International Theatre Festival 2012. Sarajevo, Bosnia and Herzegovina
- Arm und Reich Festival 2013. Schauspielhaus Zürich, Switzerland
- BITEF Festival 2013. Belgrade, Serbia
- Summer Festival 2020. Gyula, Hungary

Awards

- Price of the Federal Agency for Civic Education - 8th Politics in Independent Theatre; Staatsschauspiel Dresden 2011. HELLERAU, Germany
- International Association of Theatre Critics (IATC) award - MESS International Theatre Festival 2012. Sarajevo, Bosnia and Herzegovina
- MESS Forum "Luka Pavlović" Award by Theatre Critics and Journalists - MESS International Theatre Festival 2012. Sarajevo, Bosnia and Herzegovina
- Special Mention of MESS Jury - MESS International Theatre Festival 2012. Sarajevo, Bosnia and Herzegovina

=== Frankenstein-project ===
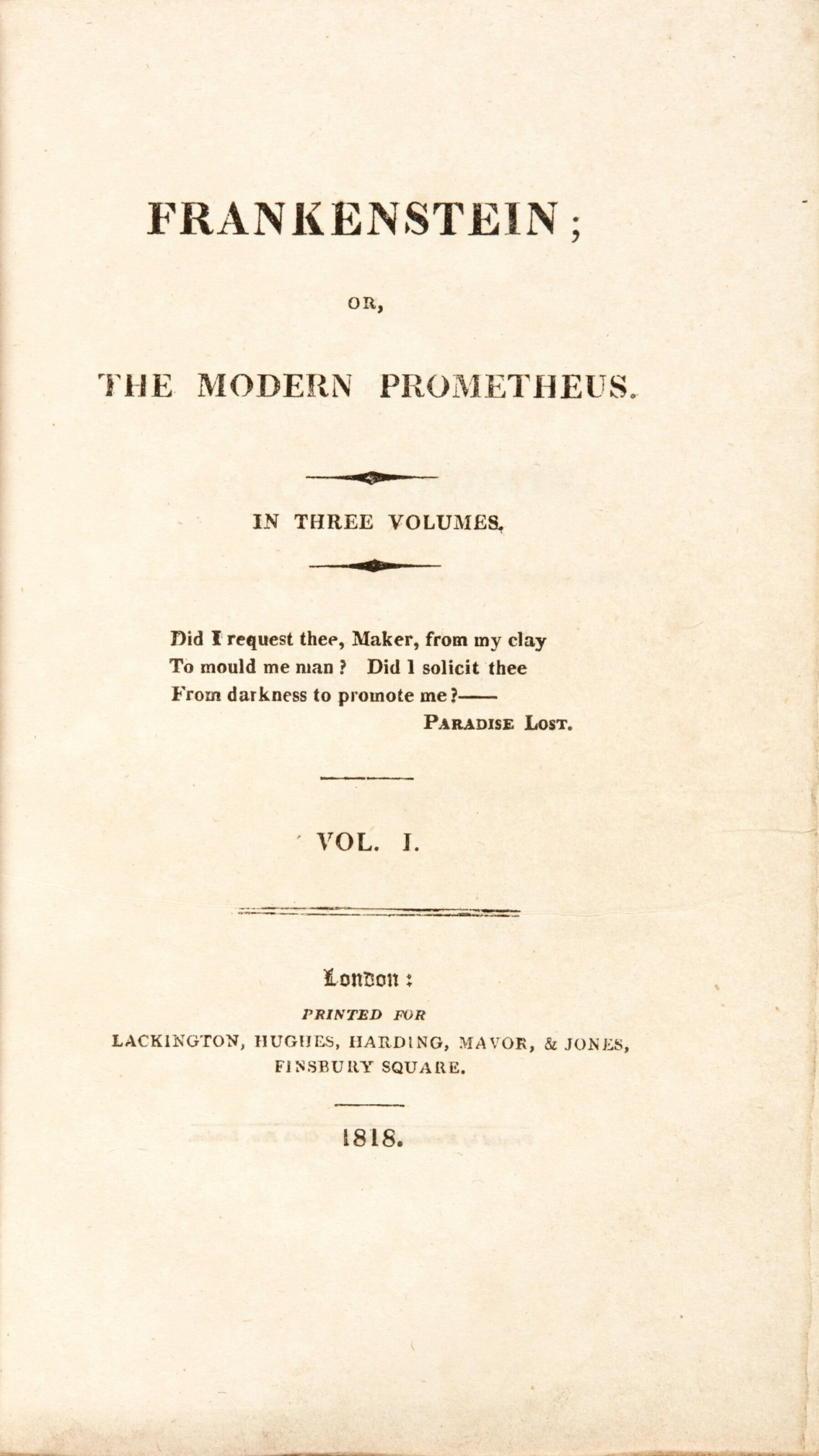
Title page of first edition of Frankenstein, Volume I., the inspiring of the Frankenstein-project

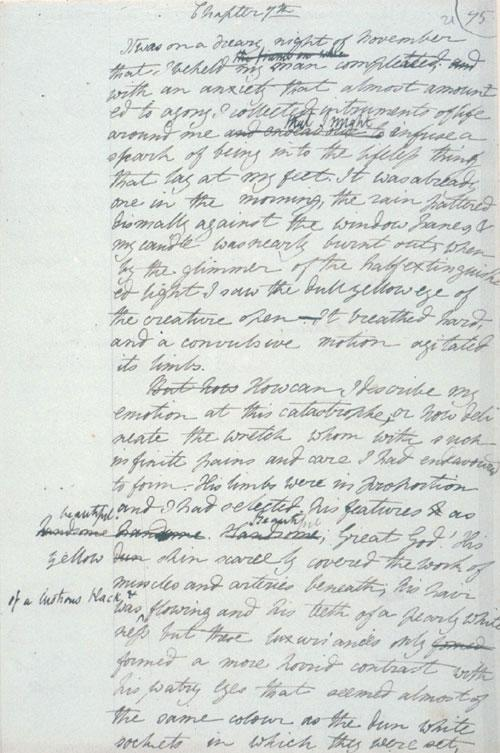
Manuscript page from Frankenstein by Mary Shelley, 1816

Director	Kornél Mundruczó
Premiere	15 October 2007 Bárka Theatre, Budapest (World premiere)
Co-production with	
Author	Kornél Mundruczó, Yvette Bíró

Festival invitations

- Festival Premiéres 2008. Strasbourg, France
- 8th National Theatre Festival 2008. Pécs, Hungary
- New Plays from Europe 2008. Wiesbaden, Germany
- International Theatre Festival Divadelná Nitra 2008. Nitra, Slovakia
- Temps d’Images, La Ferme du Buisson 2008. Paris, France
- dunaPart - Platform of Contemporary Hungarian Performing Arts 2008. Budapest, Hungary
- Krakowskie Reminiscencje Teatralne 2009. Kraków, Poland
- KunstenFestivalDesArts 2009. Brussels, Belgium
- Vienna Festival 2009. Vienna, Austria
- Mladi Levi International Festival 2009. Ljubljana, Slovenia
- New Drama Action Festival 2009. Vilnius, Lithuania
- Homo Novus Festival 2009. Riga, Latvia
- Festival de Keuze 2009. Rotterdamse Schouwburg, The Netherlands
- Europӓische Kulturtage 2010. Karlsruhe, Germany
- BITEF Festival 2010. Belgrade, Serbia
- Festival Bo:m 2011. Seoul, South Korea
- Santarcangelo Festival 2011. Santarcangelo, Italy
- F.I.N.D. 2013. Berlin, Germany
- National Theatre of Pécs 2014. Pécs, Hungary
- Transitions Central Europe Festival, Onassis Cultural Centre 2015. Athens, Greece
- Santiago a Mil International Theatre Festival 2017. Chile

Awards

- Best performance - 8th National Theatre Festival 2008. Pécs, Hungary
- Best actress: Lili Monori - 8th National Theatre Festival 2008. Pécs, Hungary
- Audience Award - 8th National Theatre Festival 2008. Pécs, Hungary
- Special Prize of BITEF - 44th BITEF Festival 2010. Belgrade, Serbia

=== The Ice ===
The original staging of The Ice by Kornél Mundruczó is dated back to 2006, when it was a co-production between the Trafó House of Contemporary Arts and Krétakör Company. In 2008 the performance was revived with some new cast members at the National Theater of Budapest, where it was on the repertoire until 2013. Two years later the show was transferred to the Trafó again, this time under the umbrella of the Proton Theater.

Director	Kornél Mundruczó
Premiere	21 September 2006 Trafó House of Contemporary Arts, Budapest • 26 September 2008 National Theatre, Budapest • 2 June 2015 Trafó House of Contemporary Arts, Budapest
Co-production with	Krétakör; National Theatre (Budapest); Trafó House of Contemporary Arts
Author	Vladimir Sorokin

Festival invitations

- Festspillene i Bergen 2008. Bergen, Norway
- International Theatre Festival "Kontakt" 2009. Toruń, Poland
- MESS International Theatre Festival 2009. Sarajevo, Bosnia and Herzegovina
- Vienna Festival 2010. Vienna, Austria
- Texture Film and Theatre Festival 2010. Perm, Russia
- 19th International Festival Theatre 2011. Plzeň, Czech Republic
- HELLERAU - European Center for the Arts 2019. Dresden, Germany

Awards

- Best young creator: Kornél Mundruczó - XIX. Międzynarodowy International Theatre Festival "Kontakt" 2009. Toruń, Poland
- Silver Laurel Wreath Award for Best Performance in the Mittel Europa category - MESS International Theatre Festival 2009. Sarajevo, Bosnia and Herzegovina
- The Special Jury Award for Best Ensemble - MESS International Theatre Festival 2009. Sarajevo, Bosnia and Herzegovina
- The Avaz Dragon Award - MESS International Theatre Festival 2009. Sarajevo, Bosnia and Herzegovina
- Texture Name Prize - Texture Film and Theatre Festival 2010. Perm, Russia
