= Pleasant Days =

2002 Hungarian drama film

Pleasant Days, Szép napok, is a 2002 Hungarian film directed by Kornel Mundruczo. Variety described the film as grim but striking. The Guardian reviewer Peter Bradshaw gave it four out of five stars.

The Hungarian Film Critics Association named it the best Hungarian film of 2003.

== Cast ==
- Tamás Polgár as Péter
- Orsolya Tóth as Maja
- Kata Wéber as Marika
- Lajos Ottó Horváth as János
- András Réthelyi as Ákos
- Károly Kuna as Józsi
- Anna Szandtner as Claudia
- Kolos Oroszi as Krisztián
- Erika Molnár as Patyi néni
- Balázs Dévai as Önkormányzati férfi
- István Tímár as Pap

== See also ==
- Cinema of Hungary
- List of Hungarian films
- List of Hungarian submissions for the Academy Award for Best International Feature Film
