= Dávid Jancsó =

Hungarian film editor

- Education: University of Theatre and Film Arts in Budapest
- Occupation: Film editor
- Parent: Miklós Jancsó (father)

Dávid Jancsó is a Hungarian film editor. He is known for his frequent collaboration with filmmaker Brady Corbet and was nominated for an Academy Award in the category Best Film Editing for the film The Brutalist (2024).

== Selected filmography ==
- White God (2014)
- The Childhood of a Leader (2015)
- Jupiter's Moon (2017)
- Pieces of a Woman (2020)
- The World to Come (2020)
- Evolution (2021)
- The Brutalist (2024)
- Monkey Man (2024; co-editor)
- At the Sea (2026)
- Place to Be (2026)

== Awards and nominations ==
Year	Award	Category	Work	Result	Ref.
2025	Academy Awards	Best Film Editing	The Brutalist	Nominated	
2025	Alliance of Women Film Journalists	Best Film Editing	The Brutalist	Won (Note: Tied with Juliette Welfling for Emilia Pérez)	
2025	Austin Film Critics Association	Best Film Editing	The Brutalist	Nominated	
2025	Chicago Film Critics Association	Best Film Editing	The Brutalist	Nominated	
2025	Critics Choice Awards	Best Film Editing	The Brutalist	Nominated	
2025	San Francisco Bay Area Film Critics Circle	Best Film Editing	The Brutalist	Runner-up	
2025	Satellite Awards	Best Film Editing	The Brutalist	Nominated	
2025	Seattle Film Critics Society	Best Film Editing	The Brutalist	Nominated	
2025	St. Louis Film Critics Association	Best Film Editing	The Brutalist	Nominated	
2025	Washington D.C. Area Film Critics Association	Best Film Editing	The Brutalist	Nominated	
