= Pieces of a Woman =

2020 American-Canadian melodrama film by Kornél Mundruczó

- Official release poster
- Directed by: Kornél Mundruczó
- Screenplay by: Kata Wéber
- Based on: Pieces of a Woman by Kornél Mundruczó; Kata Wéber
- Produced by: Kevin Turen; Ashley Levinson; Aaron Ryder
- Starring: Vanessa Kirby; Shia LaBeouf; Molly Parker; Sarah Snook; Iliza Shlesinger; Benny Safdie; Jimmie Fails; Ellen Burstyn
- Cinematography: Benjamin Loeb
- Edited by: Dávid Jancsó
- Music by: Howard Shore
- Production companies: Little Lamb; Bron Studios; Proton Cinema; Creative Wealth Media
- Distributed by: Netflix
- Release dates: September 4, 2020 (Venice); December 30, 2020 (United States); January 7, 2021 (Canada)
- Running time: 128 minutes
- Countries: Canada; United States; Hungary
- Language: English

Pieces of a Woman is a 2020 melodrama film directed by Kornél Mundruczó, from a screenplay by Kata Wéber. The film stars Vanessa Kirby, Shia LaBeouf, Molly Parker, Sarah Snook, Iliza Shlesinger, Benny Safdie, Jimmie Fails, and Ellen Burstyn as the family and associates of Martha (Kirby) involved in her traumatic childbirth, baby loss, and a subsequent court case against the midwife, Eva (Parker), whom Martha's mother Elizabeth (Burstyn) blames for the baby's death. Martin Scorsese and Sam Levinson served as executive producers, and the film was scored by Howard Shore.

An international co-production of the United States and Canada, the film is partly based on Mundruczó and Wéber's stage play of the same name and explores themes of grief and loss. It premiered on September 4, 2020, at the 77th Venice International Film Festival, where Kirby won the Volpi Cup for Best Actress. It was released in select theaters on December 30, 2020, before beginning to digitally stream on Netflix on January 7, 2021, and became noted for its long take childbirth scene at the start of the film.

The film received generally positive reviews, with praise for the actors, particularly Kirby and Burstyn, though elements of the plot were criticized. For her performance, Kirby received Academy Award, BAFTA, SAG, Critics' Choice, and Golden Globe nominations.

== Plot ==
Martha and Sean, a young Boston couple, are expecting their first child. Sean resents Martha's mother Elizabeth, a wealthy Holocaust survivor, who buys them a minivan. Sean is part of a construction team building a new major bridge across a river; scenes of the two sides of the bridge gradually advancing towards each other are interspersed throughout the film.

Martha goes into labor at their home, so Sean calls their midwife Barbara. As she is unavailable, she sends another midwife named Eva in her place. Martha struggles with nausea and pain during contractions and, when she reaches ten centimeters, Eva realizes the baby's heart rate has dropped dangerously low. When Sean asks Eva if they are safe to continue, she tells him to call 911. Martha soon gives birth to a baby girl who at first seems healthy. Eva then notices the baby is turning blue, so attempts to revive her, but she goes into cardiac arrest and dies.

The following month, Martha and Sean attend an appointment with a coroner; he is eager to find out what went wrong, while she is reluctant. They learn the cause of death has not yet been established but are told they were able to determine that the baby was in a low-oxygen environment and to start proceedings against Eva. Sean leaves, overcome with emotion, while Martha remains and decides she wants to donate the baby's body to science.

The relationship between Martha and Sean becomes strained, as is Martha's relationship with her mother, who wants to bury the baby and have a funeral. Both parents remain deeply depressed. Sean returns the car that Elizabeth bought for them. He later has sex with Martha's cousin Suzanne, and uses cocaine after being sober for almost seven years. Suzanne, who is the attorney prosecuting Eva, informs him that a potential lawsuit against Eva could be very lucrative.

At a tense family gathering at her home, Elizabeth tells Martha that she has to attend Eva's trial and blames Martha for the baby's death as she decided to have a home birth. Elizabeth then tells Sean that she never liked him before offering him a check for a large sum of money to leave and never return. Martha drops him off at Logan International Airport, who leaves for Seattle.

Months later, Martha testifies at Eva's trial. After her testimony, the judge allows her to address the court, and she states that Eva is not at fault for the death and that she does not blame her. Back home, she discovers that the apple seeds she stored in her refrigerator have started to sprout. (She had testified at the trial that she noticed her newborn baby smelled like apples.)

A month later, Martha scatters her daughter's ashes into the river from the bridge that Sean helped to build. Meanwhile, she has reconciled and even found an unspoken new bond with her mother, who is increasingly showing signs of dementia.

Years later, a little girl climbs an apple tree, picks an apple, and eats it. Martha calls Lucianna, then helps her down. The two go inside together.

== Cast ==
- Vanessa Kirby as Martha Weiss
- Shia LaBeouf as Sean Carson
- Ellen Burstyn as Elizabeth Weiss
- Molly Parker as Eva Woodward
- Sarah Snook as Suzanne Weiss
- Iliza Shlesinger as Anna "Anita" Weiss
- Benny Safdie as Chris
- Steven McCarthy as Photographer
- Tyrone Benskin as Judge
- Jimmie Fails as Max
- Harry Standjofski as Court Clerk
- Domenic Di Rosa as Medical Examiner

== Production ==
=== Play ===
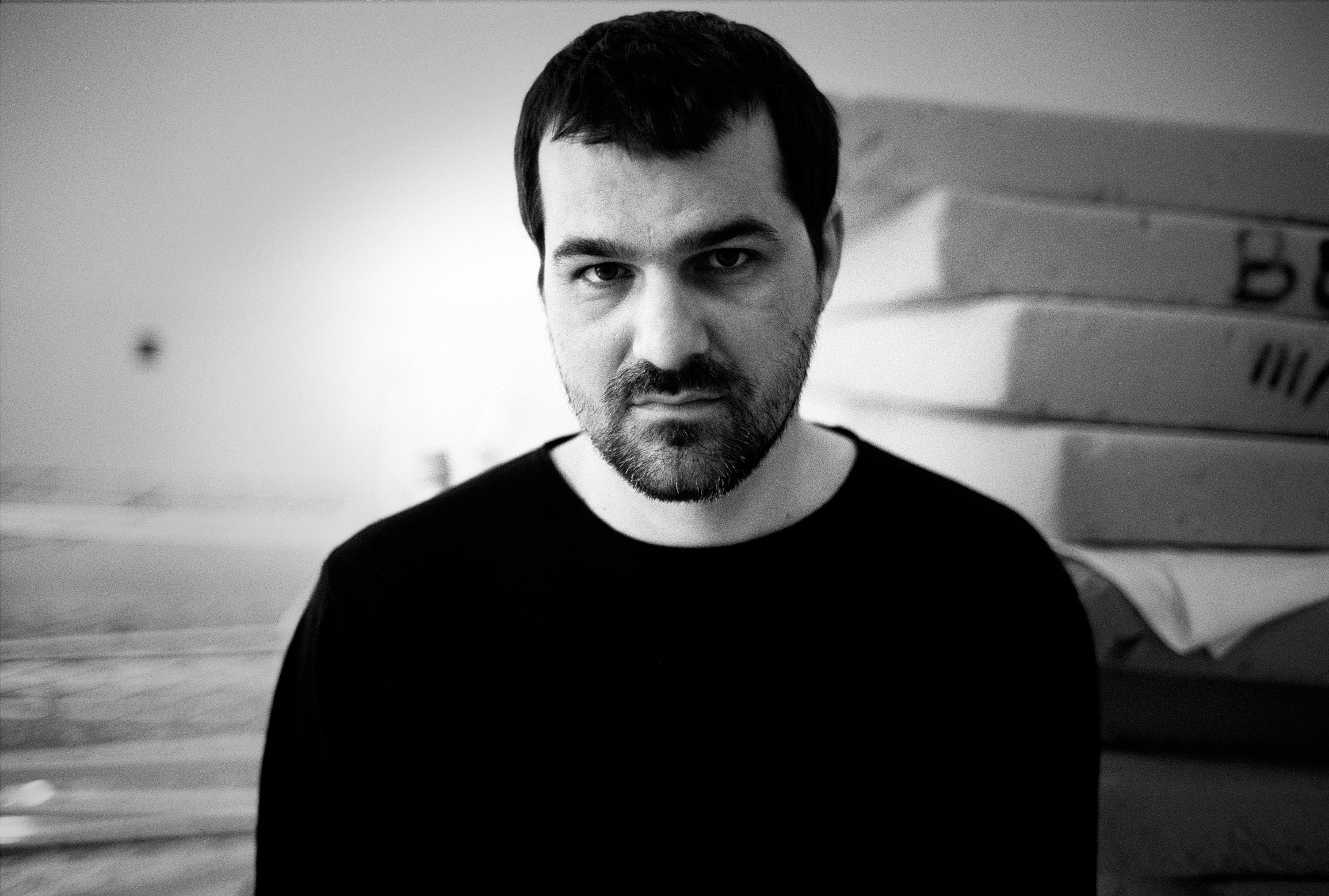
Director Kornél Mundruczó

The play Pieces of a Woman was created by Kornél Mundruczó and Kata Wéber, a couple who experienced miscarriage during pregnancy. The couple did not initially talk about their experience or process their grief, but Mundruczó read a scene written in Wéber's notebook depicting a woman and her mother debate child loss and felt that it needed exploration. Wéber, who had already titled the scene "Pieces of a Woman", became the playwright after Mundruczó encouraged her to make a "family drama" from the scene; the play was originally performed at TR Warszawa in Warsaw, Poland. Following (Polish) Maja, her senile mother, and her Norwegian husband, the play contained two scenes: the childbirth and a family dinner in the aftermath. For BroadwayWorld, Filip Piotrowicz wrote that the scenes being performed in real time with real props (including a working oven and food being cooked inside) felt both like a film and classic theatrical form. The birth scene was multimedia, with the performance being recorded by a camera freely roaming the stage and live-streamed on screens in the theater, and other screens showing ultrasound scans of the fetus.

=== Development and themes ===
The film Pieces of a Woman was announced to be in production in October 2019, with Mundruczó directing from a screenplay by Wéber. It is based on their play, and also incorporates fictionalized aspects of the trial of Hungarian midwife Ágnes Geréb. Wéber consulted with psychiatrists and other women who had lost babies while writing the film. In developing the play for the screen, Mundruczó chose to set it in Boston, thinking the city's historic Irish Catholic culture was a good translation of the conservative Polish society of the original. It is his first film in the English language. Wéber submitted the script to the Hungarian National Film Fund but did not get support; Aaron Ryder read the script and showed it to producers Ashley Levinson and Kevin Turen, who took it on. Sam Levinson and Martin Scorsese, among others, served as executive producers on the film; Scorsese, who was shown the film by composer Howard Shore prior to its release, boarded after the film was complete, hoping to help its distribution as Mundruczó and Wéber were unknown filmmakers. Supporting actress Ellen Burstyn, who was directed by Scorsese in Alice Doesn't Live Here Anymore, said that he "picked up on things [about Pieces of a Woman] that [she] never heard anybody else pick up on. And he has such an appreciation of the art of moviemaking that you feel seen."

The film explores themes of trauma, which Dr. Lipi Roy writing for Forbes found relevant during the COVID-19 pandemic when it was released; Mundruczó and lead actress Vanessa Kirby both also commented that the loss in the film can speak to people who have been bereaved in the pandemic, and Wéber spoke of the relevance of the isolation and inability to talk about feelings that Martha experiences. Kirby has described the film as "almost a character study on grief" that also explores intergenerational trauma. In the film, Martha's family are all physically present but not emotionally available to her, and they each find different ways to process their loss, according to Roy. Midwives speaking with NOW also noted that films exploring grief often do so by presenting it as a bonding experience, while Pieces of a Woman focused on the differences. Renaldo Matadeen of CBR compared the film's exploration of grief to that of Marriage Story, though he felt that Pieces of a Woman did not explore the shared grief Martha and Sean experience. Also for NOW, Kevin Ritchie noted that the film shifts focus on themes throughout, featuring class tensions at the start and, at the end, focusing on generational divides and present baggage of Holocaust survival. The New Yorker's Anthony Lane wrote that the film "amounts to a set of variations on the theme of winter", reflected in its little-changing Boston setting; similarly, Lee Marshall of Screen International opined that the wintry setting and its "oppressive" Gothic Revival architecture helped to inform the themes of the film.

=== Casting ===
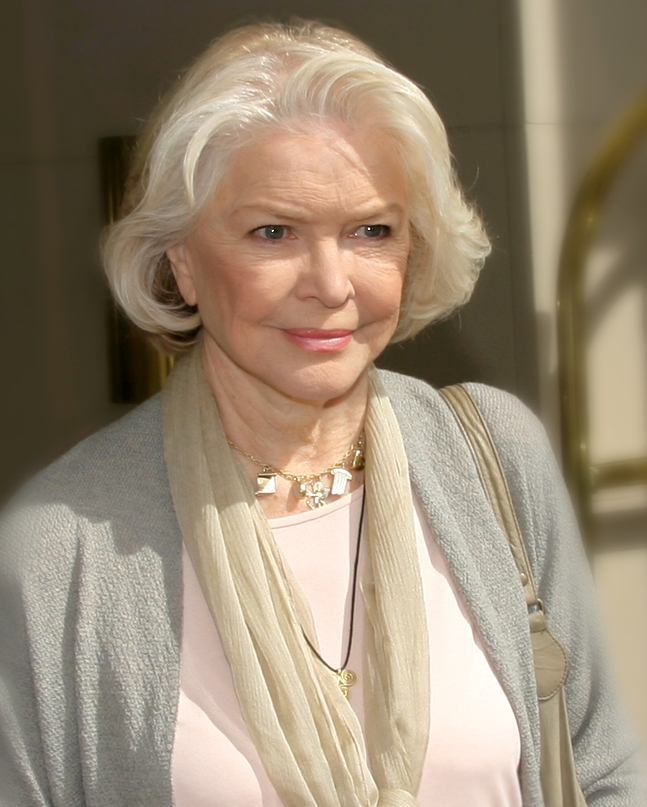
Ellen Burstyn was pleased with the substantial role for her older character.

The first person to be cast was Shia LaBeouf as Sean. He was followed shortly by Vanessa Kirby, playing Martha, who had been shown the script by Sam Levinson; she had met with the Levinsons and told them she wanted to make a film like A Woman Under the Influence. Mundruczó was a fan of The Crown and wanted to cast Kirby after watching her as Princess Margaret, Countess of Snowdon and thinking her performance resembled Claudia Cardinale and Catherine Deneuve. He also wanted to work with Kirby at this point in her career, "Where all of the skills are already there, but the fear is not [...] When you are very established, you are more and more careful." Though Kirby was considered a frontrunner in discussions for the role, the production had been turned down by bigger names before Kirby was shown the script; the day after she read it, she flew to Budapest and they had a two-hour meeting with Mundruczó. Asked about this, Kirby said that she "just loved the script ... You just know when you know".

Kirby and LaBeouf were revealed as the lead roles when the film was announced in October 2019. Kirby spoke with women who had experienced baby loss to prepare for her role, and prepared extensively for her performance of labor in the opening scene. She had not given birth herself and was concerned about realism; she first watched childbirth documentaries but felt these were too edited and so she wrote to obstetricians and was invited by one, Claire Mellon, to observe on a labor ward, including being allowed to witness a birth, which she told NPR she would not have been able to perform in the film without.

In December 2019, Jimmie Fails, Ellen Burstyn, Molly Parker and Iliza Shlesinger joined the cast of the film, followed by Sarah Snook and Benny Safdie in January 2020. Burstyn said getting cast in the film felt like "a win-win-win situation", as she was able to work with Mundruczó, whose White God Burstyn enjoyed, and Kirby, whose The Crown performance Burstyn had been impressed by; Kirby was also excited to work with Burstyn.

=== Filming ===
[...] a Netflix viewer has an advantage that someone seeing the film in a theatre doesn't–going back to that birth scene, near the beginning of the film, and rewatching it to compare the testimony with the events. The absence of editing in the childbirth scene is a way to indicate that the event has been presented in its entirety; editing would evoke the suspicion that someone–which is to say, the filmmaker–had edited not merely the images but the event, had left out details that would be relevant to consideration at trial.

— Richard Brody, The New Yorker

Principal photography began on December 3, 2019, in Montreal, Canada, and lasted until the end of January 2020.

The film is noted for its 24-minute long take labor scene at the start, dubbed "The Scene" by The Guardian's Adrian Horton and described as "one of the most controversial scenes of the year" by Entertainment Weekly. Writer Wéber did not anticipate a one-shot take, which Mundruczó planned from the start, though knew she wanted all the details present. Mundruczó began the scene with Martha's first pains and ended with the arrival of an ambulance "because [they didn't] want to show exactly what's happening", wanting to leave the audience having only seen the baby alive while creating suspense. As the director, Mundruczó wanted the actors to make their own performance choices in the scene; there were no marks to hit, LaBeouf came up with the bad jokes used himself, and the production team would not show the cast any of the stage performance so as not to influence them. Kirby told Empire that the cast "had a map of where to be, and then [they would] freefall and see what happened." Three crewmembers were used for the scene: director of photography Benjamin Loeb, acting as camera operator upon Mundruczó's request, and two boom operators. A birthing coach, Elan McAllister, had also been brought to the set to assist Kirby and LaBeouf. Loeb chose to shoot the scene with a gimbal as he wanted a "floaty" quality to the scene to represent the baby's perspective and felt that using a hand-held camera would make it look too much like a documentary; he also explained the smooth gimbal movement made the scene easier to physically watch, which was something Mundruczó wanted in order to compensate for the potentially-divisive subject matter. Loeb physically trained beforehand so that he would have the strength to carry a gimbal-loaded camera for the whole take, though the shoot still negatively affected his health.

Kirby performing in the opening scene; portraying such emotions and Martha's journey for continuous takes led Kirby to cry for "about three minutes" while Mundruczó hugged her.

The scene was filmed six times over two days, four times on one day and twice the next, with one camera; it was the first scene shot for the film and took up over 30 pages in the script. The choice to use a single take stemmed from the scene in the play and its inclusion of live video. Loeb said that they "wanted to make sure that the sequence felt like it was presented as a long-winded breath in some ways". The fourth of the six takes was used; though less technically accurate than the takes on the second day, Mundruczó felt it was more alive. Kirby was glad to be filming the scene in one take, which, while intimidating, meant that she kept the same energy throughout; she said filming the scene was like performing on stage, and that it was "the best film experience of [her] life", though it took a long time to come down from the emotions she went through in making it. To stay in the emotional place between scenes, Kirby listened to a playlist of songs about expectancy and birth.

Set within the couple's apartment, the scene was filmed in a real house. It had large archways that allowed Loeb and the cast movement – Kirby was encouraged to make use of the space if she wanted to – except for the bathroom door; Mundruczó initially wanted to pass in and out of the bathroom three times but this was reduced to once to limit the possibility of the shot being ruined. He had chosen the house because it had the same layout as the set design of their play. Before shooting, one practice run was taken; filmed on Loeb's phone, the practice took 38 minutes. Mundruczó did not do another practice, telling Vulture that "if you are very choreographed, then the whole shot can be really cold and calculated, [and] when you don't fix anything, it [can] become a Dogme style of shaking camera." A real baby was used in the scene, with a CGI umbilical cord; the baby was held by its mother just outside the apartment and brought in off-camera for the moment of birth. Mundruczó and Kirby both felt the real baby was integral to the film. Other realism was achieved in the scene: partway through the scene, Sean frantically searches for a phone to call 9-1-1, and in about half of the takes, including the final cut, LaBeouf really struggled to remember where the prop was placed.

Richard Brody of The New Yorker described the scene as a "mere stunt", saying that it is emotionally empty until the last moments and its significance to the rest of the film is an "ultimately pointless symbolic function: as evidence." Vulture's Hillary Kelly instead felt that the scene "is a technical trick, but an emotional lever, too, a reminder that labor is a process you cannot wriggle out of once it has begun."

=== Music ===
Howard Shore composed the film's score. The score consisted of piano, celesta and oboe owing to Mundruczó's insistence of classical music and was recorded during the COVID-19 pandemic lockdowns in New York, Budapest and Germany. The soundtrack was released digitally by Decca Records on January 8, 2021.

== Release ==
The film had its world premiere at the 77th Venice International Film Festival in official competition on September 4, 2020, and had its North American premiere at TIFF Bell Lightbox during the 2020 Toronto International Film Festival (TIFF) shortly afterward. On September 12, Netflix acquired worldwide distribution rights to the film at TIFF. Mundruczó was happy to sell to Netflix, saying their appreciation of independent filmmakers is comparable to United Artists in the 1970s.

A trailer was released in November 2020, and the film opened in select theaters on December 30, 2020, before beginning to digitally stream on Netflix on January 7, 2021. Upon its digital release, it was the most-watched film over its first three days of release, and finished second overall in its debut weekend.

== Reception ==
=== Critical response ===
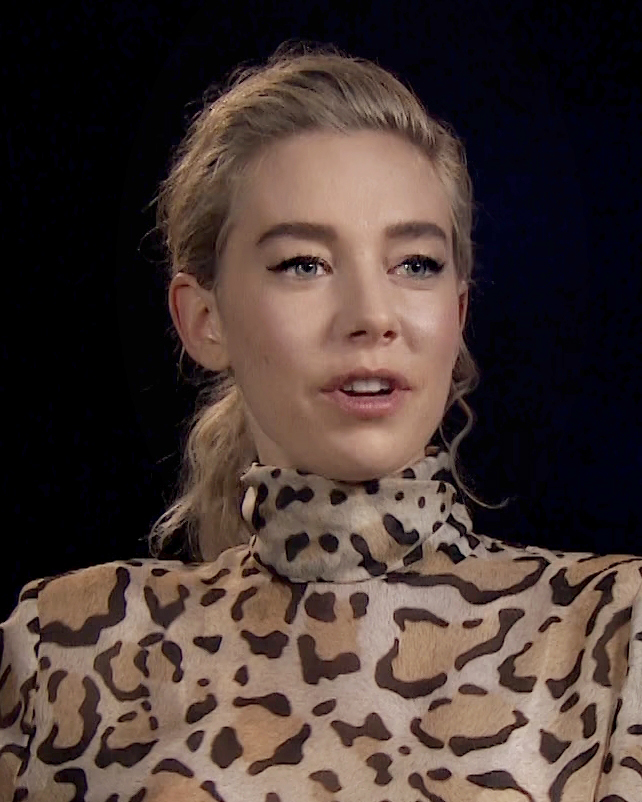
Vanessa Kirby's performance garnered widespread critical acclaim and earned her a nomination for the Academy Award for Best Actress.

On review aggregator Rotten Tomatoes, the film holds an approval rating of 75% based on 238 reviews, with an average rating of 6.8/10. The website's critics consensus reads: "Pieces of a Woman struggles to maintain momentum after a stunning opening act, but Vanessa Kirby's performance makes the end result a poignant portrait of grief." On Metacritic, it has a weighted average score of 66 out of 100, based on 41 critics, indicating "generally favorable reviews".

Pippa Vosper of Vogue, who had lost a child in a similar way to Martha in the film, said that Kirby played Martha "with unnerving accuracy" and was pleased that the film did not shy away from the harsher realities of baby loss. The Evening Standard's Charlotte O'Sullivan also praised Mundruczó for treating Martha's extended grief with compassion. Horton critiqued that the film centered on Martha's trauma rather than Martha herself, which he found frustrating, though he highly praised Kirby's performance, as did other reviewers. Empire's Terri White and Entertainment Weekly's Leah Greenblatt also praised LaBeouf's performance.

Xan Brooks of The Guardian wrote that the film was an "acting masterclass" but felt too staged; colleague Peter Bradshaw agreed on the acting talent but felt that, besides the birth scene and the ending, the film comprises "a lot of frankly inauthentic, silly and jarring plot points". The Hollywood Reporter's David Rooney opined that while Kirby's performance is "the movie's shattered core", the film was undermined by a "pedestrian" courtroom speech and awkwardly upbeat ending. Rooney, O'Sullivan, and Justin Chang for NPR were critical of simplistic metaphors and melodrama.

=== Accolades ===
Distributor Netflix initially campaigned for Kirby, LaBeouf, Burstyn, Mundruczó, Wéber, Safdie, Fails, and Snook for awards contention in acting, directing, and writing categories, but removed LaBeouf from their publicity after assault allegations were made against him by former girlfriend FKA Twigs in late 2020 to maintain focus on the film and its significance.

Award	Date of ceremony	Category	Recipient(s)	Result	Ref.
Academy Awards	April 25, 2021	Best Actress	Vanessa Kirby	Nominated	
Alliance of Women Film Journalists	January 4, 2021	Best Actress	Vanessa Kirby	Nominated	
Alliance of Women Film Journalists	January 4, 2021	Most Daring Performance Award	Vanessa Kirby	Nominated	
Alliance of Women Film Journalists	January 4, 2021	Best Actress in a Supporting Role	Ellen Burstyn	Nominated	
Alliance of Women Film Journalists	January 4, 2021	Grand Dame Award for defying ageism	Ellen Burstyn	Nominated	
British Academy Film Awards	April 11, 2021	Best Actress in a Leading Role	Vanessa Kirby	Nominated	
Casting Society of America	April 15, 2021	Feature Studio Or Independent – Drama	Jessica Kelly	Nominated	
Critics' Choice Awards	March 7, 2021	Best Actress	Vanessa Kirby	Nominated	
Critics' Choice Awards	March 7, 2021	Best Supporting Actress	Ellen Burstyn	Nominated	
Golden Globe Awards	February 28, 2021	Best Actress in a Motion Picture – Drama	Vanessa Kirby	Nominated	
Hollywood Music in Media Awards	January 27, 2021	Best Original Score in a Feature Film	Howard Shore	Nominated	
Houston Film Critics Society	January 18, 2021	Best Actress	Vanessa Kirby	Nominated	
Houston Film Critics Society	January 18, 2021	Best Supporting Actress	Ellen Burstyn	Nominated	
London Film Critics' Circle Awards	February 7, 2021	Best Lead Actress	Vanessa Kirby	Nominated	
London Film Critics' Circle Awards	February 7, 2021	Best Supporting Actress	Ellen Burstyn	Nominated	
London Film Critics' Circle Awards	February 7, 2021	Best British/Irish Actress	Vanessa Kirby (Also for The World to Come)	Nominated	
San Diego Film Critics Society Awards	January 11, 2021	Breakthrough Artist	Vanessa Kirby	Nominated	
San Diego Film Critics Society Awards	January 11, 2021	Best Actress	Vanessa Kirby	Nominated	
San Diego Film Critics Society Awards	January 11, 2021	Best Supporting Actress	Ellen Burstyn	Nominated	
Santa Barbara International Film Festival	March 31, 2021	Virtuosos Awards	Vanessa Kirby	Won	
Satellite Awards	February 15, 2021	Best Actress in a Motion Picture – Drama	Vanessa Kirby	Nominated	
Satellite Awards	February 15, 2021	Best Supporting Actress – Motion Picture	Ellen Burstyn	Nominated	
St. Louis Film Critics Association	January 14, 2021	Best Actress	Vanessa Kirby	Nominated	
St. Louis Film Critics Association	January 14, 2021	Best Supporting Actress	Ellen Burstyn	Nominated	
Screen Actors Guild Awards	April 4, 2021	Outstanding Performance by a Female Actor in a Leading Role	Vanessa Kirby	Nominated	
Venice International Film Festival	September 12, 2020	Golden Lion	Kornél Mundruczó	Nominated	
Venice International Film Festival	September 12, 2020	Young Cinema Award	Kornél Mundruczó	Won	
Venice International Film Festival	September 12, 2020	Volpi Cup for Best Actress	Vanessa Kirby	Won	
