= Lili Monori =

Hungarian actress (born 1945)

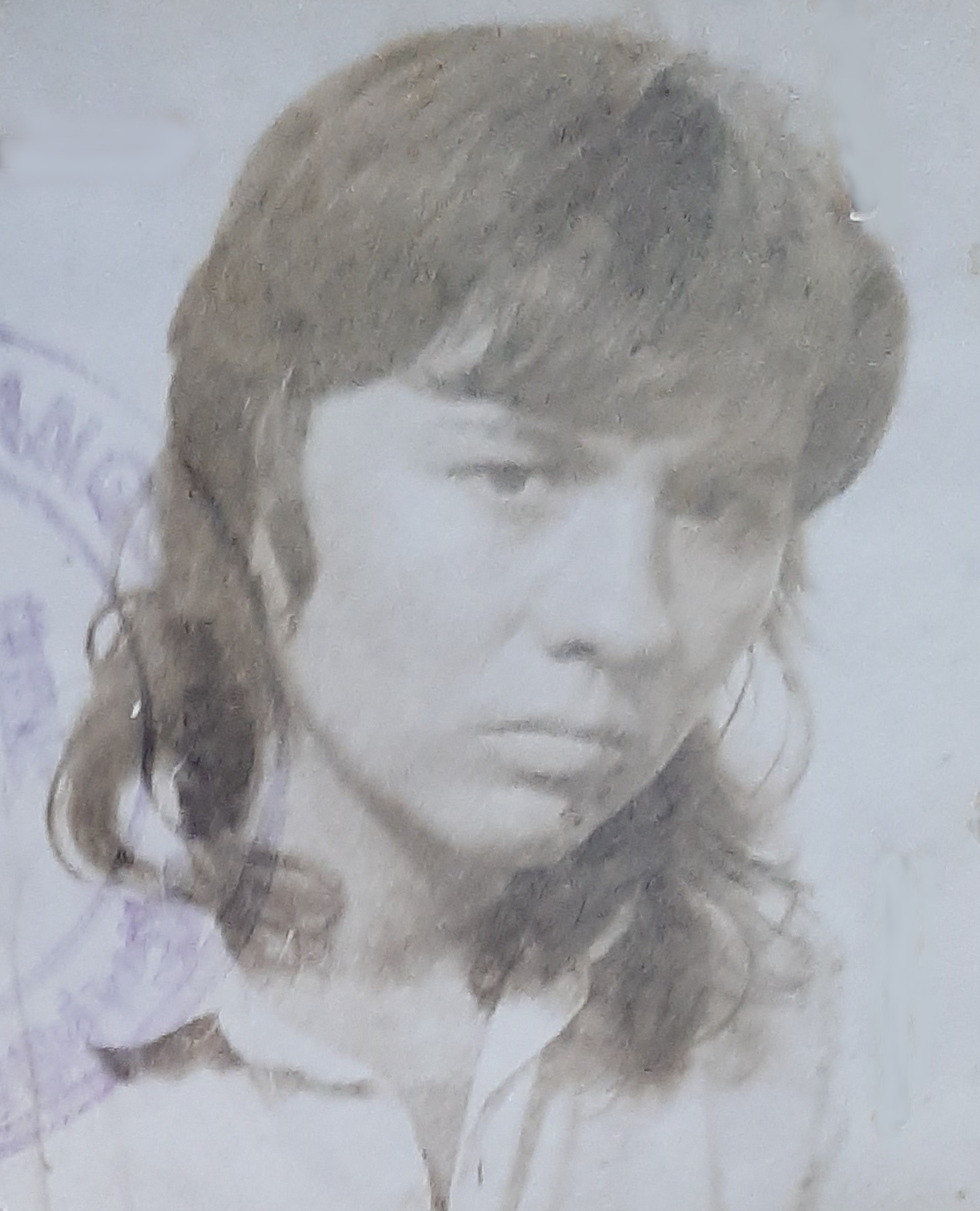
- Born: 10 October 1945 (age 81); Törökszentmiklós, Hungary
- Occupation: Actress
- Years active: 1968–present
- Partner: Miklós B. Székely
- Children: Székely Rozi

Lili Monori (born 10 October 1945) is a Hungarian actress. She appeared in more than sixty films since 1968.

== Personal life ==
From her relationship with actоr Miklós B. Székely, she has a daughter, Rozi Székely, who is also an actress.

== Selected filmography ==
Year	Title	Role	Notes
1969	The Witness	Gizi	
1976	Man Without a Name	Csatone	
1976	Nine months		
1977	Women	Juli Bodnar	
1980	The Heiresses	Szilvia	
1983	Forbidden Relations	Juli	
2008	Delta		
2010	Tender Son: The Frankenstein Project	Mother	
2014	White God	Bev	
2021	Evolution		
2024	The Hungarian Dressmaker	Marika's Mother in Law	
