= Yvette Biro =

Hungarian-American screenwriter (1930–2026)

- Born: April 3, 1930
- Died: October 17, 2026 (aged 96)

Yvette Biro (née Ungár; April 3, 1930 – October 17, 2026) was a Hungarian-American essayist and screenwriter who was Professor Emeritus at New York University Graduate Film School (NYU).

== Life and career ==
Yvette Biro was born in Budapest on April 3, 1930.

Her early books on the aesthetics of film were first published in her native Hungary, which became handbooks for film-schools in the country. Meanwhile, she worked on a dozen prizewinning films with noted directors (Miklós Jancsó, Zoltán Fábri, Károly Makk). She was both the founder and the Editor-in-Chief of Filmkultura, the magazine of the Hungarian Film Institute and Film Archive.

In the mid-1970s, she was "offered" the chance to emigrate by the Hungarian authorities. After teaching at the Sorbonne in Paris, she moved to the US to teach at the Universities of Berkeley and Stanford, California. In 1982 she was hired as a professor then became Full Professor on the faculty of New York University's Tisch School of the Arts (Film and TV Graduate Division). She worked there until her retirement in 2007.

She wrote books on film which have been translated into several languages. Her numerous essays have been published in professional magazines internationally – Film Quarterly, Études Cinématographiques, Performing Arts Journal, Bianco & Nero, Dædalus, Millennium, and The Village Voice, as well as in online publications.

Biro died on October 17, 2026, at the age of 96. She was predeceased by her husband, Attila Batár (1925–2022).

== Works ==
=== Theory and criticism ===
- 1982: Profane Mythology: The Savage Mind of the Cinema, Indiana University Press
- 2008: Turbulence and Flow in Film, Indiana University Press

=== Scripts ===
- 1995: Arrivals and Departures (film, unproduced) - winner of the European Script Fund Award
- 2003: The Stone Raft (film)
- 2006: Johanna (film)
- 2008: Delta (film) - winner of the FIPRESCI Prize in Cannes
- 2010: Tender Son
- 2009: Judasevangelium, with Kornél Mundruczó (opened at the Hamburg Thalia Theatre in September 2009)
- 2007/2008: The Frankenstein Project (European tour including Brussels, Paris, Vienna)
