= Yorick Le Saux =

French cinematographer (born 1968)

- Born: 10 August 1968 (age 57); Neuilly-sur-Seine, France
- Years active: 1976–present

Yorick Le Saux (born 10 August 1968) is a French cinematographer, graduated from La Fémis in 1994.

In 2011, Variety listed him as one of the "10 Cinematographers to Watch".

== Filmography ==
=== Short film ===
Cinematographer

Year	Title	Director	Notes
1992	Thomas reconstitué	François Ozon	
1994	Action vérité	François Ozon	
1995	La petite mort	François Ozon	
1996	A Summer Dress	François Ozon	
1996	L'homme idéal	François Ozon	
1998	Scènes de lit	François Ozon	With Mathieu Vadepied
1998	Un peu de temps réel	Olivier Torres	
2004	Les parallèles	Nicolas Saada	
2006	Mon meilleur ami	Stéphane Granata	
2006	Un lever de rideau	François Ozon	
2006	Début	Pascal Rambert	
2025	Sister Brother	Jim Jarmusch	Segment of Father Mother Sister Brother

Producer

- Un peu de temps réel (1998)
- Comme un seul homme (2002)
- À ta place (2003)
- Les parallèles (2004)
- Le souffle (2005)
- Mille soleils (2005)

=== Feature film ===
Cinematographer

Year	Title	Director	Notes
1976	Gloria mundi	Nikos Papatakis	
1995	La croisade d'Anne Buridan	Judith Cahen	
1997	See the Sea	François Ozon	
1998	Sitcom	François Ozon	
2001	Café de la plage	Benoît Graffin	
2001	Candidature	Emmanuel Bourdieu	
2003	Eager Bodies	Xavier Giannoli	With Xavier Giannoli
2003	Swimming Pool	François Ozon	
2003	Vert paradis	Emmanuel Bourdieu	
2004	5x2	François Ozon	
2005	Une aventure	Xavier Giannoli	
2006	Poison Friends	Emmanuel Bourdieu	
2006	When I Was a Singer	Xavier Giannoli	
2007	Boarding Gate	Olivier Assayas	
2008	Julia	Erick Zonca	
2009	La femme invisible	Agathe Teyssier	Also credited as writer
2009	I Am Love	Luca Guadagnino	
2010	Potiche	François Ozon	
2012	Arbitrage	Nicholas Jarecki	
2013	Only Lovers Left Alive	Jim Jarmusch	
2014	Clouds of Sils Maria	Olivier Assayas	
2015	A Bigger Splash	Luca Guadagnino	
2016	Personal Shopper	Olivier Assayas	
2018	Non-Fiction	Olivier Assayas	
2018	High Life	Claire Denis	
2019	Wasp Network	Oliver Assayas	With Denis Lenoir
2019	Little Women	Greta Gerwig	
2021	Evolution	Kornél Mundruczó	
2021	Deception	Arnaud Desplechin	
2022	Ozon: Remastered & Uncut	François Ozon	With Pierre Stoeber
2024	Blitz	Steve McQueen	
2025	The Wizard of the Kremlin	Olivier Assayas	
2026	At the Sea	Kornél Mundruczó	

Producer

- La nuit sera longue (2003)
- Poison Friends (2006)
- La femme invisible (2009) (Also writer)
- La ligne blanche (2010)
- Un enfant de toi (2012) (Associate producer)

=== Television ===
Year	Title	Director	Notes
1999	Chico, notre homme à Lisbonne	Edouard Baer	TV short; With Mathias Raaflaub
2008	Eldorado	Olivier Assayas	Documentary film
2010	Carlos	Olivier Assayas	Part 1
2020	We Are Who We Are	Luca Guadagnino	3 episodes
2022	Irma Vep	Olivier Assayas	Miniseries; With Denis Lenoir

== Awards ==
- 2011 - 8th International Cinephile Society Awards - Cinematography (I Am Love)
- 2026 – Robby Müller Award at the 55th International Film Festival Rotterdam.
