= Félix Lajkó =

Hungarian musician and composer

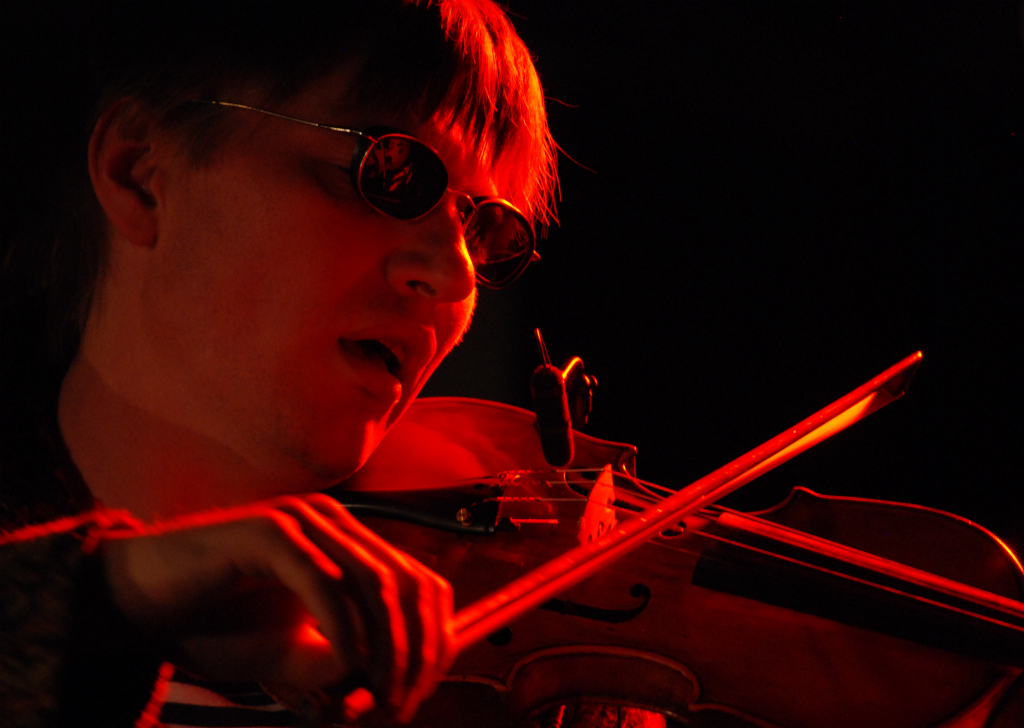
Lajkó at a concert in May 2011 Photo by László Juhász http://laci.sk

Félix Lajkó (Serbian: Феликс Лајко, Feliks Lajko; born 17 December 1974 in Bačka Topola, SR Serbia, SFR Yugoslavia) is a Hungarian violinist, zither player and composer. He plays a variety of musical styles: folk music (traditional string music of the Pannonian plain, Romani music), world music, classical music, integrating rock, blues, jazz, trance genres and improvised melodies. In concert, he plays violin and zither either with his small band, solo and other artists.

He has also worked as an actor, taking the lead role in the 2008 film Delta when the original lead actor died. His first zither played 2013 album "Mező" had been led Word Music Charts Europe for 2 months.

== Biography ==
Lajkó was born in Bačka Topola, Serbia to ethnic Hungarian parents. He started playing the zither at the age of 10. His first contact with the violin was at the age of 12. He has finished the six years of musical school in three years. Lajkó finished his formal studies and turned towards concerting.

== Collaborations and work ==
Lajkó has played together with a large number of well-known bands and musicians. He was a member of György Szabados' band, Makúz and Boris Kovač's band, Ritual Nova. He performed together with the world-famous Japanese butoh dancer, Min Tanaka and the French Noir Desir band a number of times. He has had many concerts together with the London-based Romanian violin player Alexander Balanescu and with Boban Marković's brass gipsy band.

Lajkó has composed music for some theatrical plays. Among others, he wrote the complete music material for the Subotica Teatre's Public Enemy production. Jozef Nadj from Orléans regularly invites him to compose music for his performances and he has also composed music for choreographies of Ivett Bozsik. He composed the whole musical score for Wheels, a film by Serbian director Đorđe Milosavljević. It was also him who composed the hymn for the 1998 Sarajevo cultural festival, "Sarajevska Zima". He has participated in many fiction films and Miklós Jancsó made his short film Play, Félix! about Lajkó. He wrote music for Towards a New Atlantis, a project of the Venice Biennale in 2000. Lajkó also composed music for and acted as the main character of Kornél Mundruczó's film Delta - a film which won a small prize in Cannes, and was nominated for the Golden Palm. It was the Hungarian Film Festival's winning film, and Lajkó was awarded the best original soundtrack award at the Festival. 2016-2017 Lajkó collaborated with Hungarian dub-trance duo Óperentzia in a folk-trance project fusioned his zither music and psychedelic electronic music.

== Discography ==
- Lajkó Félix & Volosi (2019)
- Lajkó Félix: Most jöttem... (2016)
- Lajkó Félix: Mező (2013)
- Lajkó Félix: Makovecz turné (2011)
- Lajkó Félix: A bokorból (2009)
- Lajkó Félix: Remény (2007)
- Lajkó Félix 7 (2005)
- Félix (2002)
- Lajkó Félix and his Band (2001)
- Boban Marković Orkestar Feat. Lajkó Félix (2000)
- Lajkó Félix and his Band: Concert ’98 (1998)
- Lajkó Félix– Attila Lőrinszky: Live at the Academy (1997)
- Lajkó Félix and his Band (1997)
- Noir Désir: 666.667 Club CD (guest musician) (1996)
- Samaba Trió: Opus Magnum CD (guest musician) (1996)
- Lajkó Félix and his Band (1995)
- Mihály Dresch Dudás: Zeng a lélek (1993)
