= The Eremites =

- Directed by: Ronny Trocker
- Written by: Ronny Trocker
- Produced by: Susanne Mann; Paul Zischler
- Starring: Andreas Lust
- Cinematography: Klemens Hufnagl
- Edited by: Julia Drack
- Release date: September 2, 2016 (Venice Film Festival)
- Country: Germany

The Eremites (German: Die Einsiedler) is a 2016 German drama film written and directed by Ronny Trocker. It premiered in the Horizons section at the 73rd edition of the Venice Film Festival.

== Plot ==
The film tells the story of Albert, a man in his mid-30s, and his mother, the mountain farmer Marianne. Albert is the only surviving child of the Eggerhof farmers Marianne and Rudl, his three siblings died on the way to school in an avalanche accident many years ago. Despite his age, his mother still largely determines Albert's life. She wants to spare him the lonely life on the mountain and be the last to run the farm. So she organized a job for him in a marble quarry down in the valley. The introverted Albert initially found it difficult to make friends there, occasionally sneaking back into the yard to spend the night secretly in the hay store. One day his father Rudl had a fatal accident at work. Marianne hides this fact from her son and the outside world, fearing that Albert might return to the farm to take over his father's duties, and buries Rudl's body on the mountain. However, as her strength begins to wane, she confesses to Albert that his father died in an accident and asks Albert for help. But he has now settled in the valley and met Paola, a Hungarian guest worker and canteen cook at the marble quarry, with whom a love story is beginning. Albert is in a quandary, the first snow falls, so Albert has to make a quick decision if he doesn't want his mother to freeze to death at court. In addition, Paola tells him that she has to return to Hungary. Albert is given three days' leave to organize his life.

== Cast ==
- Andreas Lust as Albert
- Ingrid Burkhard as Marianne
- Orsi Tóth as Paola
- Hannes Perkmann as Gruber
- Peter Mitterrutzner as Rudl
- Hans Peter Hallwachs as Marble Quarrys CEO Dr. Koch
- Georg Kaser as Foreman Peter
