= Place to Be (film) =

2026 film by Kornél Mundruczó

- Directed by: Kornél Mundruczó
- Written by: Kata Wéber
- Produced by: Jomon Thomas; Megan Wynn; Alexander Rodnyansky
- Starring: Ellen Burstyn; Taika Waititi; Pamela Anderson; Édgar Ramírez; Lena Waithe; Murray Bartlett; Maika Monroe
- Cinematography: Germain McMicking
- Edited by: Dávid Jancsó
- Production companies: S'YA Concept; Screen NSW
- Release date: September 9, 2026 (Venice)
- Running time: 110 minutes
- Countries: United States; Australia; Singapore
- Language: English

Place to Be is a 2026 drama film directed by Kornél Mundruczó and written by Kata Wéber. A co-production of the United States, Australia, and Singapore, it stars Ellen Burstyn, Taika Waititi, Pamela Anderson, Édgar Ramírez, Lena Waithe, Murray Bartlett, and Maika Monroe.

The film had its world premiere out of competition at the 83rd Venice International Film Festival on September 9, 2026.

== Premise ==
An unlikely friendship forms between no-nonsense Brooke and divorcee Nelson, as they travel from Chicago to New York City to return a lost racing pigeon.

== Cast ==
- Ellen Burstyn as Brooke, a no-nonsense woman
- Taika Waititi as Nelson, a divorced man
- Pamela Anderson
- Édgar Ramírez
- Lena Waithe
- Murray Bartlett
- Maika Monroe

== Production ==
In March 2025, Kornél Mundruczó announced his next film, titled Place to Be, written by his frequent collaborator Kata Wéber. Ellen Burstyn, Taika Waititi, Pamela Anderson, Édgar Ramírez, and Lena Waithe joined the cast, as principal photography began in Sydney. In April 2025, Murray Bartlett and Maika Monroe joined the cast.
