= At the Sea =

- Directed by: Kornél Mundruczó
- Written by: Kata Wéber
- Produced by: Alex Lebovici; Stuart Manashil; Kornél Mundruczó; Alexander Rodnyansky; Aaron Ryder; Andrew Swett
- Starring: Amy Adams; Murray Bartlett; Brett Goldstein; Chloe East; Dan Levy; Jenny Slate; Rainn Wilson
- Cinematography: Yorick Le Saux
- Edited by: Dávid Jancsó; Ilka Janka Nagy
- Music by: Sacha Galperine; Evgueni Galperine
- Production companies: AR Content; Ryder Picture Company; Hammerstone Studios
- Release date: February 16, 2026 (Berlinale)
- Running time: 112 minutes
- Countries: United States; Hungary
- Language: English

At the Sea is a 2026 drama film directed by Kornél Mundruczó and written by Kata Wéber. Starring Amy Adams as Laura, it follows a middle-aged woman readjusting to life after rehab. It also stars Murray Bartlett, Brett Goldstein, Chloe East, Dan Levy, Jenny Slate, and Rainn Wilson, in supporting roles.

The film had its world premiere at the main competition of the 76th Berlin International Film Festival on February 16, 2026, where it was nominated for the Golden Bear.

== Premise ==
After rehabilitation, Laura returns to her family's beach home, readjusting to her old life without her career that gave her identity. She faces her next chapter, forced to move on.

== Cast ==
- Amy Adams as Laura Baum
- Murray Bartlett as Martin
- Chloe East as Josie
- Brett Goldstein as Keegan
- Dan Levy as Peter
- Redding L. Munsell as Felix
- Jenny Slate as Debbie
- Rainn Wilson as George

== Production ==
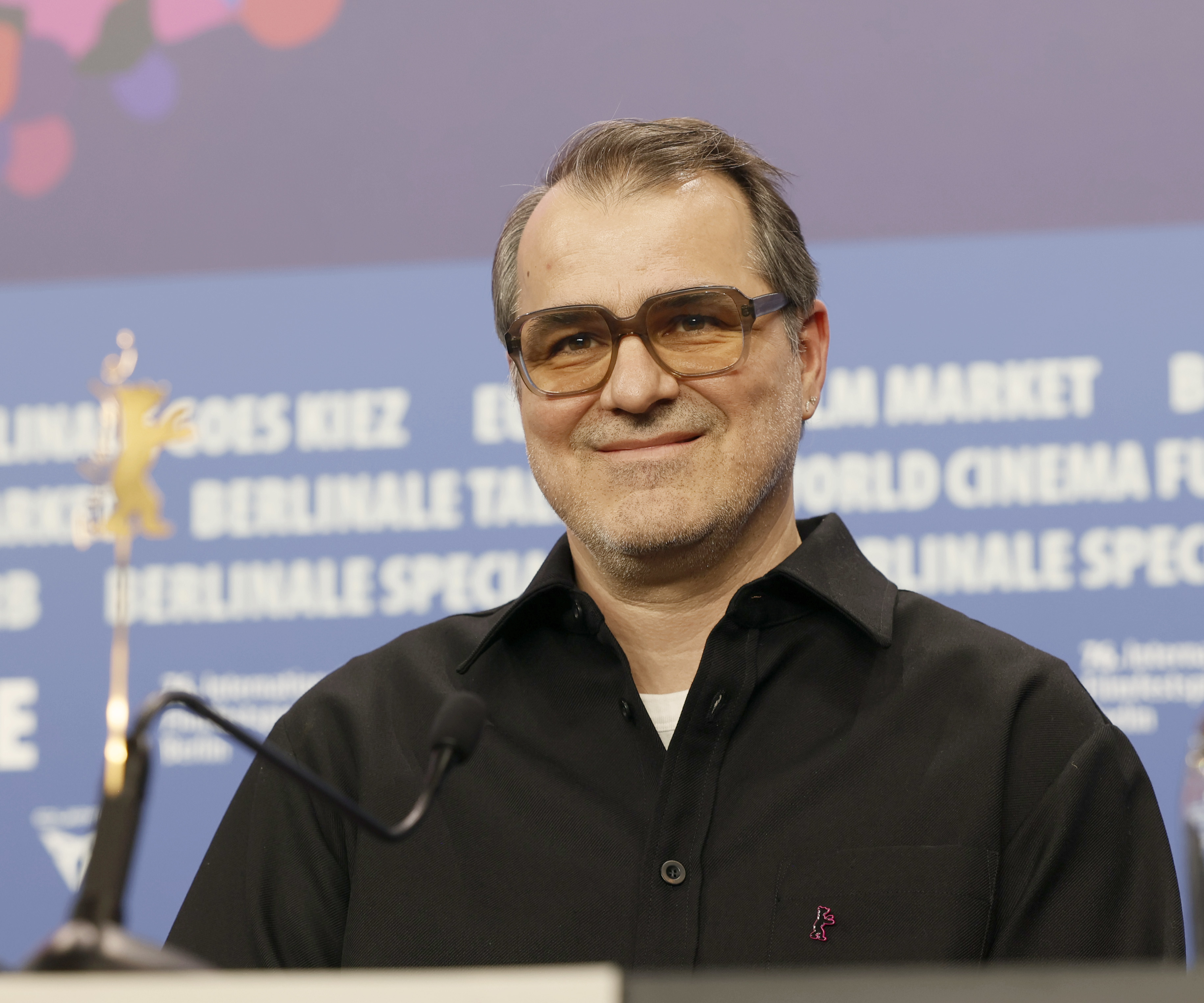
Kornél Mundruczó at the 2026 Berlinale

In April 2024, it was announced that Kornél Mundruczó would be directing a drama film titled At the Sea with Kata Wéber writing the screenplay, and Amy Adams cast in the lead role as Laura. In June, Murray Bartlett joined the cast. The next month, Brett Goldstein, Chloe East, Dan Levy, Jenny Slate, and Rainn Wilson rounded out the cast of the film.

=== Filming ===
Principal photography began in late June 2024, in Boston and concluded on August 12.

== Release ==
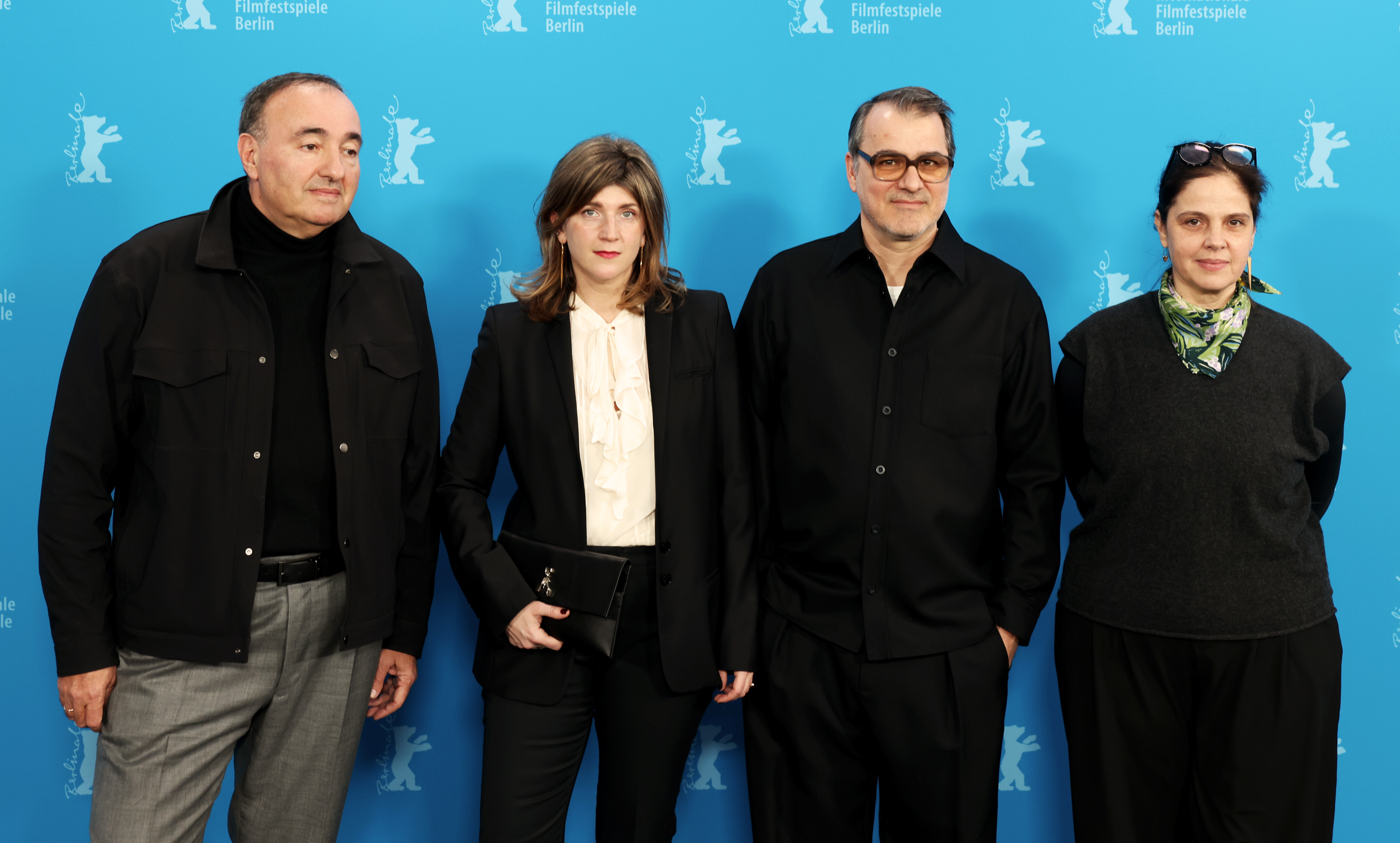
Alexander Rodnyansky, Kata Wéber, Kornél Mundruczó and Viktória Petrányi at the 76th Berlin International Film Festival

At the Sea premiered at the 76th Berlin International Film Festival on February 16, 2026.

== Critical reception ==
On the review aggregator website Rotten Tomatoes, 32% of 19 critics' reviews are positive.
