= Krétakör =

Arts center in Budapest, Hungary

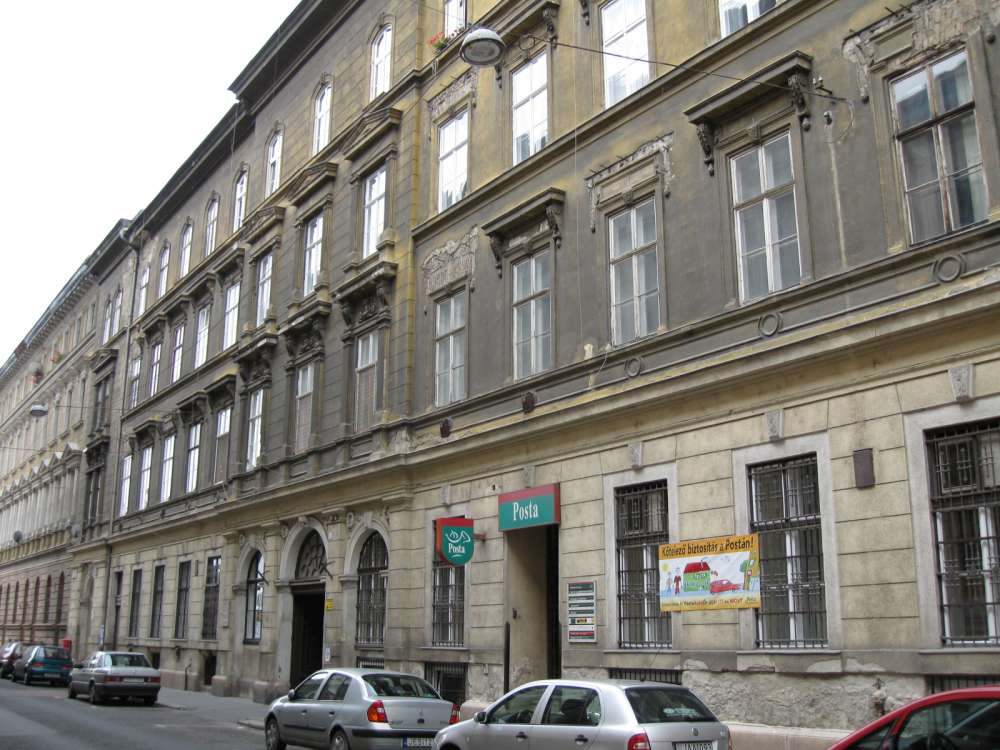
The building

Krétakör (Chalk Circle) is a centre for contemporary arts and a production company, which creates creative community games by using experiences of social sciences. The organisation primarily produces works of performing and media arts and runs education programs. Its artistic director is Árpád Schilling; its general manager is Linda Potyondi.

== Organization ==
Krétakör operates as a foundation and it is made up of three organizational subunits: Management, Performing Arts Workshop, New Media Art Workshop and Education Workshop.

== Method ==
"Schilling has expounded his new ars poetica which he has followed since 2008 not only in practice but also in his writings, interviews, essays and articles concerning the Escapologist-project. His artistic creed is based on two principles: on the one hand it is to question traditional theatrical functions (spectator, actor, director, scriptwriter, space), on the other hand it sets a new goal, which is not primarily directed to the aesthetic role of the theatre, but more to its social role." (Anikó Orosz)

Krétakör defined its activity by creating the notion of Creative Community Games. Throughout a Creative Community Game the participants express their sense of freedom by respecting the rules that they have created together. The sense of freedom is a state of mind, in which the human being is able to give constructive answers to environmental stimuli. The sense of freedom comes to be when the community does not restrict the individual's creativity, but utilizes it. Creative Community Games include all kind of human activities which ensure the conditions of a healthy and fair competition for the participant, which are realised in an effective and solidary cooperation satisfying the basic needs of "homo ludens". It is Creative because it relates to social questions and problems in a fresh, innovative way, in a creative attitude, it provides knowledge for the participants, rouses them to action and prompts them to make decisions. It is Community because it regards the participating partner as a collaborator, it takes upon itself to reinforce civic self-government and support grassroots initiatives. It is a game because it describes the event to be created in the context of games, so it considers that the only constructive basis for pedagogical and social methodology is experiencing through participation.

== Projects ==
- The Apology of the Escapologist, 8 March - 1 May 2009, Budapest

It was a series of events, an "urban therapy", which consisted of 5 consecutive events. The first two were an exhibition at a public square (Overture) and in the basement of Gödör/Pit (Gap). Those who visited the latter one could register to a theatrical performance (Labhotel). It was followed by three performances showed at the same time which were created by three female directors involving civil participants (this sequence was called Artproletart). The whole event was finished off with a celebration on 1 May (Finale). Gábor Péter Németh made a documentary about the whole series of events with hundreds of participants. This documentary was shown as part of the competition during the Hungarian Film Festival in 2010.

- Obstacle Race, October 2009

It was a theatre in education (TIE) programme, which was realised in collaboration with Káva Drama and Theatre in Education Association. One high school class at a time could participate in a two-hour performance where the colleagues of Krétakör and Káva played the headmaster and the teachers of the school. The students could become active participants of the game as students or teachers.

- The Analogy of the Escapologist, October 2009 – January 2010

It was a concert series inspired by the 2009 series of events, and created by Marcell Dargay. The concerts given by the invited artists were not ordinary; they formed a musical event series in which musicians only relied on musical instruments without any explanation or verbal communication. Their aim was to create an analysis from a musical approach. They mixed compositions from past and new composers using different composing techniques (recording as well as improvisation). The series was made up of 4 concerts, which were divided in space as well as in time.

- URBANRABBITs, premier: 9 December 2009, Châlons-en-Champagne, France

URBANRABBITs was a circus theatre performance with the graduate students of the Centre National des Arts du Cirque (National Centre for Circus Arts), directed by Árpád Schilling. The performance was a co-production of the school and Krétakör. "The urban rabbit is a new, clever and witty mutation. The URBAN RABBIT's presentation combines the ordinary and the breathtaking into a single narrative, effortlessly uniting circus and theater." (The Urban Rabbits at the French Circus Academy, CUF Műsorújság, 23 July 2010)

- Mother-Analogy, January 2010

Mother-Analogy was a multimedia apartment theatre performance, which was also inspired by the 2009 series of events. It was performed three times. Written and directed by: Árpád Schilling. Actors: Zsolt Nagy, Lilla Sárosdi and Lawrence Williams, who was also the composer and the musician of the production. It was an artistic experiment examining issues such as fear of commitment and problems arising between a man and a woman when they live together and have a baby. The happening-like event was innovative in the way it combined the familiar atmosphere of a room theatre with the picture-like staging of an opera.

- Mayday, 30 April – 2 May 2010

Mayday was a performance art piece created as part of the Pécs2010 – Cultural Capital of Europe event series. It was a three-day long public play organized by Krétakör with the participation of civil organizations, which reflected on the mining past of Pécs.

- Can you hold the line?, June–July 2010

It was a social campaign, sponsored by Heineken Hungary, in which Krétakör participated by producing short videos. The goal was to raise awareness among young adults regarding the most probable motivations and most obvious consequences of excessive alcohol consumption.

- New Spectator, August 2010

It was a community development programme realised in collaboration between Krétakör, Káva Drama and Theatre in Education Association and anBlokk Association. It took place in two villages in north-eastern Hungary, in order to offer a public forum for social dialogue between Roma and non-Roma or minority and majority communities. Throughout the project a short feature was made with four Roma youths. Moreover, both Krétakör and Gábor Péter Németh made a documentary about the project.

- Crisis Trilogy, June–October 2011

It is a summation of and improvement upon the organization's experiences in the past three years. This trilogy showed the story of the Gát family through different performance art mediums. The first part of it was a film (jp.co.de), installation and live action, which was presented at the Prague Quadrennial. The second part was a chamber opera (Ungrateful Bastards), which was first performed at the Bavarian State Opera's summer festival. The third part was a theatrical performance (The Priestess), in which professional actors and Transylvanian children played together. Its premier was in Trafó House of Contemporary Arts in Budapest.

- Mobil

It is a creative community game developed by Krétakör for 16-18-year-old students using innovative method to combine drama teaching and knowledge distribution activities in a school environment.

== Base ==
Between 2008 és 2014 Krétakör's Base was a cultural, receptive place on the second floor of a block of flats (2 Gönczy Pál Street). This was a 600 m2 base is owned by the Council of Ferencváros and operated by Krétakör Foundation. Pál Gönczy, who gave the street's name, had an important role in public education after the Compromise (1867). In the building baron Loránd Eötvös, physicist, in the honor of his father József Eötvös (writer and minister of education), founded a student residence for talented university students who lived in difficult financial situation and usually came from the country. The legendary Eötvös College is a phenomenon. The high-quality and value-based education and research which took place in a free atmosphere established its reputation, not to mention its former students' achievements. The prominent figures of Hungarian culture and science such as Zoltán Kodály, Gyula Szekfű, István Sőtér, Zoltán Gombocz, Béla Balázs, Géza Laczkó, Aladár Kuncz and many others were the members of the College. The role of the Krétakör Base was to accommodate the innovative, cultural workshops and artists who are supported by Krétakör Foundation. The supported workshops and artists between 2009 and 2011: Accord Quartett, Márk Bodzsárk, Marcell Dargay, dunaPart- contemporary performing arts showcase, Feldmár Institute, Dóra Hegyi – tranzitblog.hu, Péter Kárpáti, Káva Drama and Theatre in Education Association, Blue Point Drug Consultation Centre and Clinic, Annamária Láng, Gábor Péter Németh, Márta Schermann, Balázs Simon- Utcaszak, Milán Újvári- RadiotBallet, Tranzit.hu, Sándor Zsótér - Maladype Theatre.

== Theatre ==
The organization's predecessor Krétakör Theatre, a Hungarian company without a permanent building, was in action between 1995 and 2008. "The chalk is the metaphor of transience and revival: if we draw a circle, we start something, and when we finish it, we wipe up the chalk." (Árpád Schilling) It was Árpád Schilling who founded the theatre in 1995, before he started studying stage directing at The University of Theatre and Film Arts in Budapest. Initially Krétakör did not have a permanent company, Schilling asked actors to create a performance which would be either presented or not. In 1998 Máté Gáspár joined the Krétakör Theatre. In 2000 he became the production manager, later on the general manager of the theatre, which operated from that moment with a permanent company. In 2000 the Odeon Theatre from Paris invited the company to perform Bertolt Brecht's play, Baal. This performance was hugely successful amongst the professionals and the audience as well. This was the starting point of Krétakör's international triumph. From 2002 the company got a significant financial aid thanks to Patrick Sommier, French theatre director, which made possible important developments. For this season the theatre could sign up a company of 40 members. From then on, it was not only Schilling who could work with the company, but other guest directors as well, for example Kornél Mundruczó and Sándor Zsótér, who are prominent figures of the Hungarian film and theatre arts. The company, in that format, worked together until 30 June 2008. In 2008, following Árpád Schilling's decision, Krétakör Theatre was transformed to Krétakör.
