= The Witness (1979 film) =

A tanú
- DVD cover
- Directed by: Péter Bacsó
- Written by: Péter Bacsó; János Újhegyi
- Starring: Ferenc Kállai; Lajos Őze; Béla Both; Lili Monori
- Cinematography: János Zsombolyai
- Edited by: Sándor Boronkay
- Music by: György Vukán
- Distributed by: Mafilm
- Release date: June 6, 1979 (Hungary)
- Running time: 104 minutes
- Country: Hungary
- Language: Hungarian

The Witness (Hungarian: A tanú, also known as Without a Trace), is a Hungarian political satire comedy film directed by Péter Bacsó, co-written by Bacsó and János Újhegyi, and starring Ferenc Kállai, Lajos Őze, Béla Both, and Lili Monori.

Created in a tense political climate at a time when talking about the early 1950s and the 1956 Revolution was still taboo, the production was financed and allowed to be made by the communist authorities. It was subsequently banned from release and grew a cult following. It was first screened in 1979. It screened at the 1981 Cannes Film Festival in the Un Certain Regard section. A sequel was produced in 1994 named Megint tanú (Witness Again).

In April 2019, a restoration was selected to be shown in the Cannes Classics section at the 2019 Cannes Film Festival.

== Plot ==
In 1950, following the communist takeover of Hungary, József Pelikán, a single father who previously participated in the WW2 communist movement of Hungary, is working as a dike-reeve in a small town near the Danube. He meets an old friend from the underground communist movement, Zoltán Dániel, now a government official who fishes at the Danube, near the dike. Dániel falls in the river, and Pelikán rescues him and invites him to his home. While the two reminisce old times at Pelikán's home, the ÁVH suddenly appears. They received a "serious anonymous report" stating Pelikán committed an illegal act of slaughtering a pig for food. Dániel tries to save him by demonstrating to the ÁVH thugs how the loyal Pelikán hid him during the purgings years before, but he unknowingly reveals the basement, where all the pork had been hidden. Pelikán is taken to prison though later released, on "higher command". Comrade Virág, being unnecessarily benevolent, gives various assignments to Pelikán such as being the director of a swimming pool, an amusement park, and an orange research institute. Pelikán, being "ideologically under-educated", fails magnificently in all his assignments, visiting the prison regularly, until they ultimately succeed with the orange research institute and are awarded. As it turns out, all this was arranged to force Pelikán to be the witness in a show trial against his old friend, Zoltán Dániel, who fell out of the favour of the communist regime. Pelikán is meticulously reshaped to fit the expected image of the archetypical "Hungarian worker, 1950" to be the perfect witness. Before the trial they present Pelikán with a pre-written testimony he must memorize, but at the end, before the judge, accused, Comrade Virág, and top communist leaders, Pelikán decides to tell the truth instead. He is thrown back in prison as a reprisal. While awaiting hanging, the political climate changes due to Stalin's death and he is released and he meets once again with Comrade Virág on the tram who has lost all his former power and influence.

== Cast ==
- Ferenc Kállai – József Pelikán, dike-reeve
- Lajos Őze – Árpád Virág
- Béla Both – Comrade Bástya
- Zoltán Fábri – Zoltán Dániel
- Lili Monori – Gizi
- Károly Bicskey – Elemér Gulyás
- György Kézdi – Virág's detective
- József Horváth – Railwayman
- Róbert Rátonyi – Operetta actor

== Notes ==
- Janet Maslin, New York Times review, 26 September 1981
