= Aaron Ryder =

American film producer

- Occupation: Film producer
- Employer: Ryder Picture Company

Aaron Ryder is an American film producer.

Early in his career, he was an executive producer of Christopher Nolan's Memento (2000) and Richard Kelly's Donnie Darko (2001), and also produced Nolan's The Prestige (2006). Ryder was one of the founding members of FilmNation Entertainment. During his time at FilmNation, he produced Mud (2012), House at the End of the Street (2012), The Founder (2016), Pieces of a Woman (2020), and The Map of Tiny Perfect Things (2021). In 2016, Ryder produced Denis Villeneuve's Arrival, which earned him an Academy Award for Best Picture nomination with Shawn Levy, Dan Levine, and David Linde. In early 2021, Ryder formed Ryder Picture Company, a film and television production company with a first-look-deal with MGM. Ryder's first production under the Ryder Picture Company banner, Bruiser (2022), premiered at the Toronto International Film Festival 2022, and the second feature, Dumb Money, was released in 2023.

== Filmography ==
Producer

- Get It On! (1998) (Also director and writer)
- The Amateurs (2005)
- The Return (2005)
- The TV Set (2006)
- The Prestige (2006)
- Hamlet 2 (2008)
- My One and Only (2009)
- Sanctum (2011) (co-producer)
- The Raven (2012)
- Mud (2012)
- House at the End of the Street (2012)
- Premature (2014)
- Transcendence (2014)
- Arrival (2016)
- The Founder (2016)
- Ideal Home (2018)
- Life Itself (2018)
- The Lodge (2019)
- Pieces of a Woman (2020)
- The Map of Tiny Perfect Things (2021)
- Reminiscence (2021)
- The Good House (2021)
- Bruiser (2022)
- To Catch a Killer (2023)
- Dumb Money (2023)
- All of You (2024)
- At the Sea (2026)
- I Love Boosters (2026)
- The Death of Robin Hood (2026)
- Onslaught (2026)
- Shiver (2027)

Executive producer

- Memento (2000)
- Donnie Darko (2001)
- The Mexican (2001)
- Wish You Were Dead (2001)
- Stark Raving Mad (2002)
- Wrong Turn (2003)
- Red Dog (2011)
- Far Out (2016)
- Miss Sloane (2016)
- The Sense of an Ending (2017)
- Kill Switch (2017)
- Greyhound (2020)

Special thanks

- Hurt (2009)
- Eye in the Sky (2015)

Miscellaneous crew

Year	Title	Role
1995	French Kiss	Production coordinator: Working Title Films, Los Angeles
1997	Bean	Coordinator: L.A.
2013	All Is Lost	Distribution partner: FilmNation Entertainment team
2017	Disobedience	Co-president production & acquisitions: FilmNation Entertainment
2019	Late Night	In-house producer: FilmNation Entertainment
2020	The Courier	In-house producer: FilmNation Entertainment
2020	Promising Young Woman	In-house producer: FilmNation Entertainment
2020	The Nest	In-house producer: FilmNation Entertainment

== Awards and nominations ==
- Academy Award for Best Picture – Arrival – Nominated
- BAFTA Award for Best Film – Arrival – Nominated
- Producers Guild of America Award for Best Theatrical Motion Picture – Arrival – Nominated
