= Tender Son: The Frankenstein Project =

2010 Hungarian film by Kornél Mundruczó

- Theatrical poster
- Directed by: Kornél Mundruczó
- Screenplay by: Kornél Mundruczó
- Based on: Tender Son: The Frankenstein Project by Kornél Mundruczó; Frankenstein by Mary Shelley
- Produced by: Viktória Petrányi
- Starring: Rudolf Frecska
- Cinematography: Mátyás Erdély
- Edited by: David Jancsó
- Music by: Philipp E. Kümpel; Andreas Moisa
- Production company: Proton Cinema
- Release dates: 22 May 2010 (Cannes); 9 September 2010 (Hungary)
- Running time: 105 minutes
- Country: Hungary
- Language: Hungarian
- Budget: € 1.6 million

Tender Son: The Frankenstein Project (Hungarian: Szelíd teremtés: A Frankenstein-terv) is a 2010 Hungarian film written and directed by Kornél Mundruczó, developed from his own theatrical play and loosely based on Mary Shelley's Frankenstein. The film was screened in the main competition at the 2010 Cannes Film Festival, where it was poorly received by critics.

== Cast ==
- Rudolf Frecska as boy
- Kitty Csíkos as girl
- Kornél Mundruczó as director
- Lili Monori as mother
- Miklós Székely B. as father

== Production ==
The film was produced by Proton Cinema with co-production support from fellow Hungarian companies Filmpartners and Laokoon Film, Germany's Essential Filmproduktion and Austria's KGP Produktion. It received 150 million HUF (€540,000) in support from the Motion Picture Public Foundation of Hungary and 145,000 Euro from the Mitteldeutsche Medienförderung in Germany. The total budget was €1.6 million.

== Reception ==
Peter Brunette of The Hollywood Reporter was highly critical of the film: "One wonders what the grand poobahs at the Cannes Film Festival were thinking when they chose "Tender Son -- The Frankenstein Project," a disastrously bad Hungarian film, for the competition. It's pokey and pretentious, and all character motivations, which are often contradictory if not ridiculously illogical, seem based on the film's symbolic needs rather than on real-life psychological desires." In Variety, Boyd van Hoeij was disappointed with how the filmmakers had bypassed the original novel's mythological allusions: "Mundruczo and regular co-scripter Yvette Biro (Delta, Johanna) have completely neutered Shelley's clever notion of a hero [sic] incompatible with his surroundings by replacing the monster with a flesh-and-blood human with no backstory, turning him into a supposed equal rather than a misunderstood outcast. Without a clear understanding of his psychology or past (How was he treated in the orphanage? How does he feel about his parents' absence for most of his life?), his random killing spree seems simply incomprehensible and vile." In 2010, film won Special Jury Prize at Sarajevo Film Festival.
