= Zsombor Jéger =

Hungarian actor

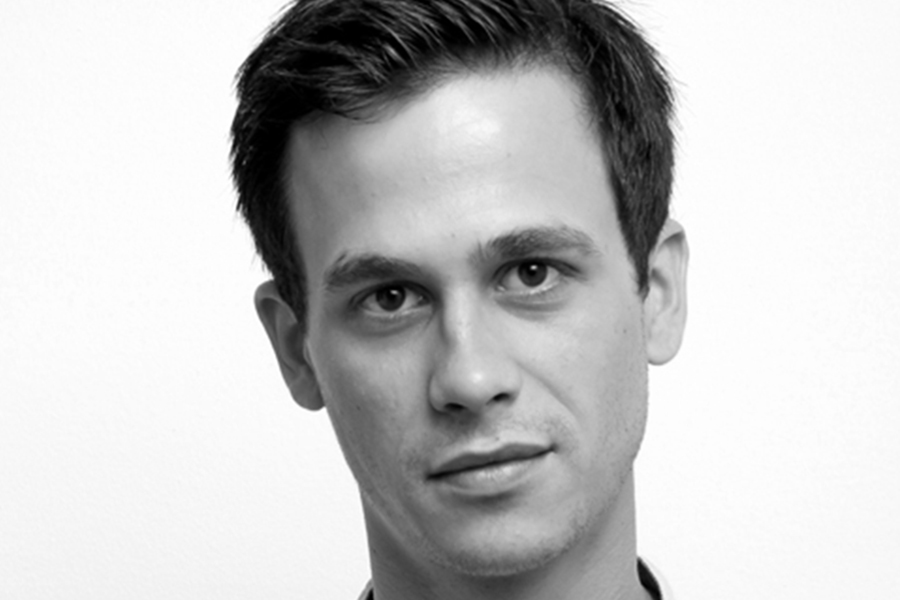
- Born: March 16, 1991 (age 34); Debrecen
- Occupation: Actor
- Years active: 2016–present
- Known for: Jupiter's Moon

Zsombor Jéger (Hungarian: [ˈʒombor ˈjeːɡɛr]; born 16 March 1991) is a Hungarian actor. He had his debut age four in A dzsungel könyve, a Hungarian musical based on The Jungle Book, at the Csokonai Theatre in Debrecen, where he later acted in several children and youth roles. Jéger is a graduate from the Academy of Drama and Film in Budapest, and has been acting in several plays at the Örkény Theatre in Erzsébetváros, Budapest.

== Early life and family background ==
Zsombor Jéger was born in Debrecen Hungary. He is the son of Jéger Attila who is a piano tuner and has been playing in several bands in the mid 1990s playing alternative Blues. His mother Bandi Margit is a Hungarian teacher, and mental hygiene specialist. Jéger grew up with his two sisters who are also bonded with the Hungarian artistic sphere.

At an early age he started playing the violin and has been playing ever since. He plays many instruments in an autodidact way.

== Films ==
- 2017: Jupiter's Moon
