= Delta (2008 film) =

2008 film by Kornél Mundruczó

Delta (also called "Delta" in the original language) is a 2008 Hungarian drama film directed by Kornél Mundruczó and starring violinist Félix Lajkó in a non-musical acting role and actress Orsi Tóth. Supporting cast include Sándor Gáspár as the stepfather, Lili Monori as the mother, Sándor Fábián as the uncle, Tamás Polgár as the village boy.

Delta won the 2008 Golden Reel at Hungarian Film Week.
