= Johanna (film) =

2005 film

- Film poster
- Directed by: Kornél Mundruczó
- Written by: Kornél Mundruczó; Yvette Biro; Viktória Petrányi
- Produced by: Viktória Petrányi; Béla Tarr
- Starring: Orsolya Tóth
- Cinematography: Mátyás Erdély; Nagy András
- Edited by: Vanda Arányi
- Music by: Zsófia Tallér
- Release date: 18 May 2005
- Running time: 86 minutes
- Country: Hungary
- Language: Hungarian

Johanna is a 2005 Hungarian musical drama film directed and co-written by Kornél Mundruczó and produced by Béla Tarr. It was screened in the Un Certain Regard section at the 2005 Cannes Film Festival. The plot of the film is a retelling of story of Joan of Arc set in a hospital. The musical character of the film is operatic, with the characters speaking entirely in song, with two main characters being dubbed by singers.

== Premise ==
Johanna, a young drug addict, falls into a deep coma after an accident. Doctors miraculously manage to save her from death’s doorstep. Touched by grace, Johanna cures patients by offering her body. The head doctor is frustrated by her continued rejection of him and allies himself with the outraged hospital authorities. They wage war against her but the grateful patients join forces to protect her.

== Cast ==
- Orsolya Tóth - Johanna (as Orsi Tóth)
- Eszter Wierdl - Johanna's Voice
- Zsolt Trill - Young Doctor
- Tamás Kóbor - Young Doctor's Voice
- Dénes Gulyás - Professor
- József Hormai - 1st Doctor
- Sándor Kecskés - 2nd Doctor
- Viktória Mester - 1st Nurse
- Hermina Fátyol - 2nd Nurse
- Andrea Meláth - 3rd Nurse
- Kálmán Somody - Cleaning Man
- János Klézli - Fireman
- Géza Gábor - Patient
- Kolos Kováts - Patient
- Sándor Egri - Patient
- István Gantner - Liver Patient
