= Evolution (2021 film) =

2021 film

- Hungarian: Evolúció
- Directed by: Kornél Mundruczó
- Written by: Kata Wéber
- Produced by: Viola Fügen; Michael Weber; Viktória Petrányi
- Starring: Lili Monori; Annamária Láng; Padmé Hamdemir; Goya Rego
- Cinematography: Yorick Le Saux
- Edited by: Dávid Jancsó
- Music by: Dascha Dauenhauer
- Production companies: Match Factory Productions; Proton Cinema
- Distributed by: Mozinet
- Release dates: 11 July 2021 (Cannes); 25 November 2021 (Hungary)
- Running time: 97 minutes
- Country: Hungary
- Languages: Hungarian; German

Evolution (Hungarian: Evolúció) is a 2021 Hungarian drama film directed by Kornél Mundruczó and written by Kata Wéber. Loosely based on Wéber's family experiences as Holocaust survivors, it follows three generations of a Hungarian Jewish family marked by the World War II.

The film had its world premiere at the Cannes Premiere section of the 2021 Cannes Film Festival on 11 July, and was released in Hungary by Mozinet on 25 November.

== Cast ==
- Lili Monori as Eva
- Annamária Láng as Lena
- Padmé Hamdemir as Yasmin
- Goya Rego as Jonas
- Jule Bowe as Frau Clausen

== Production ==
French cinematographer Yorick Le Saux, shot the film in three long takes, each take follows a different generation of a Hungarian Jewish family in Budapest.
