= White God =

2014 film

- Theatrical release poster
- Hungarian: Fehér isten
- Directed by: Kornél Mundruczó
- Written by: Kornél Mundruczó; Viktória Petrányi; Kata Wéber
- Produced by: Eszter Gyárfás; Viktória Petrányi
- Starring: Zsófia Psotta; Luke and Body; Sándor Zsótér; Szabolcs Thuróczy; Lili Monori; László Gálffi
- Cinematography: Marcell Rév
- Edited by: Dávid Jancsó
- Music by: Asher Goldschmidt
- Production companies: The Chimney Pot; Film i Väst; Filmpartners; Hungarian National Film Fund; Pola Pandora Filmproduktions; Proton Cinema; ZDF/Arte
- Distributed by: InterCom Zrt.
- Release dates: 23 May 2014 (Cannes); 12 June 2014 (Hungary)
- Running time: 121 minutes
- Countries: Hungary; Germany; Sweden
- Languages: Hungarian; English
- Budget: HUF$700 million; (USD$2.5 million)
- Box office: $581,904

White God (Hungarian: Fehér isten) is a 2014 Hungarian drama film co-written and directed by Kornél Mundruczó and starring Zsófia Psotta. The film premiered on 17 May 2014, as part of the 2014 Cannes Film Festival.

== Plot ==
A mixed-breed street dog named Hagen befriends troubled thirteen-year-old Lili, whose mother has just sent her to live with her estranged father, who has not seen Lili since she was an infant. Lili insists on keeping Hagen, but because Hagen is a mixed-breed, he is subject to a large "mongrel" fee imposed by the Hungarian government. Lili's father offers to buy Lili a purebred dog if only she will get rid of Hagen. Lili is angry that her father thinks Hagen can be so easily replaced, and the incident underscores the lack of understanding between father and daughter.

Fearful that her father will get rid of Hagen while she is away, Lili takes the dog to her music class, where his appearance causes chaos. The teacher threatens to kick Lili out of music class unless she takes the dog outside. Instead, Lili strikes out with Hagen into the city, but they are found by her father, who left work to look for them after the music teacher phoned him. Lili's father is embarrassed by the incident, and in his anger, he drives Hagen to the outskirts of the city and abandons him on the side of the road. Hagen chases after their car but is unable to follow them.

Hagen begins a lonely journey wandering the city. He eventually befriends a white dog after it saves him from an angry butcher. After spending the night with other street dogs, a dog catcher pursues Hagen and the other street dogs. After a long chase, Hagen avoids the dog catchers with the help of a homeless man. However, the man sells Hagen to a dog fighting ring, where he is chained, starved, and trained to kill. In his first fight, he kills his opponent and escapes, but he is caught by animal control officers and brought to the city pound.

Meanwhile Lili, still angry with her father and upset by the loss of Hagen, goes to a party where drugs and alcohol are present. The party is raided by the police, and Lili is taken to the station. Arriving to pick her up, her father breaks into tears and admits that he was wrong to get rid of Hagen and that while he does not understand the now-teenage Lili, he still loves her. The two reconcile and her father, in a gesture of getting reacquainted with his daughter, promises to attend her upcoming concert.

On the other side of the city, Hagen escapes from the pound after killing one of the staff. He breaks open the cages and frees the other dogs, who follow him into the city. With Hagen as their leader, the dogs start an uprising against their human oppressors, wreaking mayhem as Hagen locates and kills all the people who harmed him. The pack reaches the concert hall where Lili is playing, and the concert-goers barricade themselves within for safety. Spotting Hagen, Lili sneaks out of the concert hall and follows the dog pack on her bicycle.

Followed by his army, Hagen goes to the slaughterhouse where Lili's father works, where they appear on the verge of taking revenge on him when Lili arrives. Hagen growls at Lili and his army surrounds her. Her father rushes from the building armed with a blowtorch to defend his daughter, but instead, Lili plays Franz Liszt's "Hungarian Rhapsody No. 2" on her trumpet. Hagen calms down and lies down to listen. All the other dogs lie down in a gesture of reconciliation as Lili sits in their midst and continues to play. She then lies down facing Hagen. Her father, stunned at the scene, puts down his weapon and goes to lie down beside his daughter.

== Cast ==
- Zsófia Psotta as Lili
- Sándor Zsótér as Dániel
- Lili Horváth as Elza
- Szabolcs Thuróczy as Old man
- Lili Monori as Bev
- László Gálffi as Music teacher
- Gergely Bánki as Dog-catcher
- Tamás Polgár as Dog-catcher
- Bodie and Luke as Hagen the dog

== Animal welfare during filming ==
Approximately 250 dogs were used in the film. With the exception of Bodie and Luke (the pair of brother dogs that portray Hagen), all the animal extras were dogs recruited from shelters or from the streets of the shooting location and trained with an eye toward their humane treatment and ultimate rehabilitation by Teresa Anne Miller, daughter of Hollywood animal trainer Karl Lee Miller whose work with animals includes films such as Babe and Cujo. Approximately 98% of the dogs were adopted after filming.

== Reception ==
=== Critical reception ===
On review aggregator Rotten Tomatoes, the film holds an approval rating of 88% based on 101 reviews, with an average rating of 7.6/10. The website's critical consensus reads, "White God isn't an easy watch, but its soaring ambition and powerful acting—human and canine alike—make it well worth the effort." On Metacritic, the film has a score of 80 out of 100 from 29 critics, indicating "generally favorable reviews".

=== Awards and nominations ===
White God won the Prize Un Certain Regard at the 2014 Cannes Film Festival and the Octopus d'Or at the Strasbourg European Fantastic Film Festival for the Best International Feature Film. The dogs in the film were also awarded with the Palm Dog Award. The film was selected as the Hungarian entry for the Best Foreign Language Film at the 87th Academy Awards, but it was not nominated.

== See also ==
- List of submissions to the 87th Academy Awards for Best Foreign Language Film
- List of Hungarian submissions for the Academy Award for Best Foreign Language Film
