= Orsolya Tóth =

Hungarian actress (born 1981)

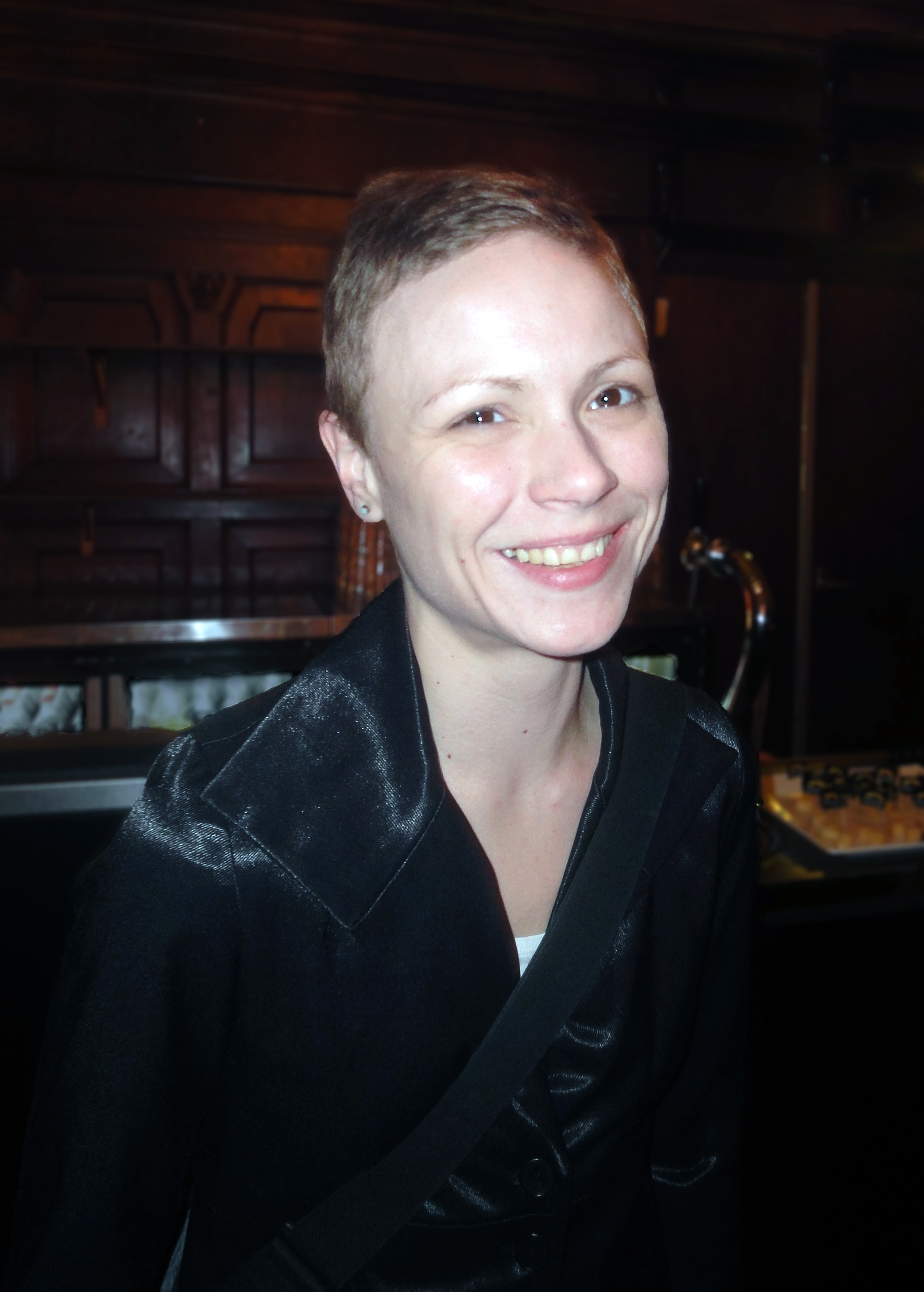
- Orsolya Tóth at the première of Silent Ones during the International Film Festival Rotterdam, 2013
- Born: 20 November 1981 (age 44); Békéscsaba, Békés County, Hungary
- Occupation: Actress
- Years active: 2002–present

Orsolya Tóth (born 20 November 1981) is a Hungarian actress. She has appeared in 26 films since 2002. She played the title role in the film Johanna, which was screened in the Un Certain Regard section at the 2005 Cannes Film Festival.

== Selected filmography ==
- Johanna (2005)
- Delta (2008)
- Lourdes (2009)
- Women Without Men (2009)
- The Notebook (2013)
- The Eremites (2016)
