= Kata Wéber =

Hungarian playwright and actress

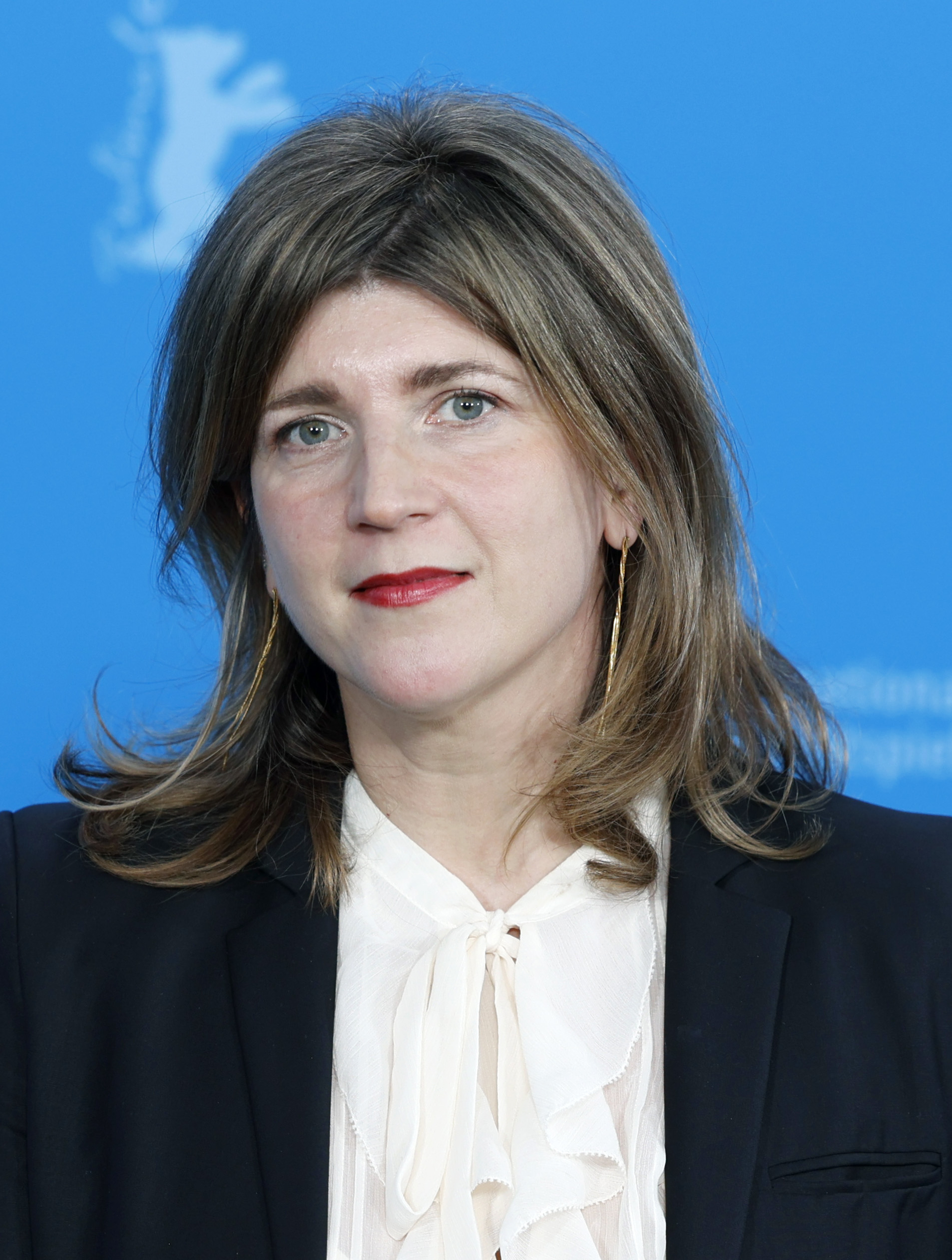
- Wéber in 2026
- Born: 26 July 1980 (age 46); Budapest, Hungary
- Occupations: Screenwriter and actress

Kata Wéber is a Hungarian screenwriter, playwright and former actress who often works with her husband, Hungarian filmmaker Kornél Mundruczó.

Wéber is most known for wrote White God (2014), Jupiter's Moon (2017) and Pieces of a Woman (2020). Her screenplay for Evolution (2021) is loosely based on her family experiences as Holocaust survivors.

== Career ==
Kata Wéber attended the University of Theatre and Film Arts in Budapest. She began her career as an actress, before moving into playwriting. Already knowing director Kornél Mundruczó, Wéber collaborated with him in theatre. When Mundruczó began working in film, Wéber joined him, writing for White God and Jupiter's Moon. However, the pair say that when they collaborate they "leave each other to work. [They] don't disturb each other. [They] have to agree on a topic and on the approach how to do it but then [they] have [their] own territories."

She was invited to write a play for the TR Warszawa in 2017, which became Pieces of a Woman after Mundruczó read her notes about child loss and encouraged her to write about it, which she says became like therapy though she had initially resisted turning the "too personal" experience into a play. To write it, she moved to Berlin, deliberately far away from Mundruczó and their daughter. In December 2018 they premiered the play in Warsaw. Mundruczó said Wéber's notes "were the most personal and the most beautiful writing by Kata [he] ever read".

== Personal life ==
Wéber is married to Mundruczó, whom she met when she was an actress at university around the year 2000. They have experienced a miscarriage, which inspired the play and film Pieces of a Woman. They did not talk about the loss until making the play. They have a daughter. The couple also advocate for the arts in Hungary; after their alma mater was taken over by the government, they wore protest T-shirts at the 77th Venice International Film Festival, where Pieces of a Woman premiered.

She is Jewish and the child of Holocaust survivors.

== Filmography ==
=== Feature film ===
Year	Film	Director	Notes
2014	White God	Kornél Mundruczó	Co-written with Kornél Mundruczó and Viktória Petrányi
2017	Jupiter's Moon	Kornél Mundruczó	Co-written with Kornél Mundruczó
2020	Pieces of a Woman	Kornél Mundruczó	
2021	Evolution	Kornél Mundruczó	
2026	At the Sea	Kornél Mundruczó	
2026	Place to Be	Kornél Mundruczó	
TBA	The Revolution According to Kamo	Kornél Mundruczó	Filming
