= Kornél Mundruczó =

Hungarian film director

- Mundruczó in 2026
- Born: 3 April 1975 (age 51); Gödöllő, Hungary
- Occupations: Film and theatre director
- Years active: 1996–present

Kornél Mundruczó (Hungarian: [ˈmundrut͡soː ˈkorneːl]; born 3 April 1975) is a Hungarian filmmaker and theatre director, most known for his films about contemporary Hungary.

White God (2014), won the Un Certain Regard prize at the 67th Cannes Film Festival, while Delta (2008) Tender Son: The Frankenstein Project (2010) and Jupiter's Moon (2017) were nominated for the Palme d'Or.

He made his English-language debut with Pieces of a Woman (2020), which was nominated for the Golden Lion.

== Early life ==
Mundruczó earned a diploma from Hungary's Academy of Film and Drama in 1998 as an actor, then in 2003 as a film and television director. In that same year, he founded Proton Cinema Ltd., dedicated to film production, along with Viktória Petrányi, a constant co-creator and collaborator in his work and writing since the academy.

== Career ==
=== Theatre ===
Mundruczó has worked in theatre and opera since 2003, first in Hungary and then in theatres abroad such as the Thalia Theater in Hamburg, the TR Warszawa, the Schauspielhaus Zürich and the Vlaamse Opera. He is most keen to begin new projects where he finds the subject, collaborators and venue inspiring. During the creative process, he strives to create a team. For new projects, he very often casts the same actors, who work with him as creative partners. After freelancing with more or less the same group of people for several years, in 2009, he founded Proton Theatre, his independent theatre company, with producer Dóra Büki.

Proton Theatre is a virtual artistic company organised around the director's independent productions. Besides preserving maximum artistic freedom, their goal is to ensure a professional structure for their independently produced theatre plays and projects. Chiefly, their performances are realized as international co-productions, and their frequent collaborators include the Wiener Festwochen, HAU Hebbel am Ufer in Berlin, Kunstenfestivaldesarts in Brussels, Trafó House of Contemporary Arts in Budapest and Hellerau in Dresden. Productions directed by the artistic leader include The Ice (2006); Frankenstein-project (2007), which inspired his later film Tender Son; Hard to be a God (2010); Disgrace (2012), based on the post-apartheid novel by Nobel Prize-winner J. M. Coetzee and, in turn, inspiring his film White God; Dementia (2014), Winterreise (2015), Imitation of Life (2016), The Raft of the Medusa (2018), Evolution (2019) inspiring his film with the same title, The Seven Deadly Sins/Motherland (2020) and Parallax. In addition, Proton wishes to provide space for the realisation of company members’ ideas. In this spirit, they created the following performances: Last (2014), directed by Roland Rába; 1 link (2015), directed by Gergely Bánki and Finding Quincy by János Szemenyei.

Proton's performances have toured to more than 130 festivals until 2024, including the Festival d’Avignon, the Adelaide Festival, the Singapore International Festival, the Seoul Bo:m Festival, and the Zürcher Theater Spektakel.

In 2017, for Imitation of life, Mundruczó was nominated for the Faust Award. It was the first time in the history of this award that a non-German theatre, in this case a Hungarian independent company was nominated. In the same year Mundruczó has been nominated for the Europe Prize Theatrical Realities of the Europe Theatre Prize.

In 2024 Mundruczó won the Nestroy Theatre Prize for Best Director for Parallax by Proton Theatre. It was the first time not only a Hungarian director was awarded, but also for a Hungarian production.

=== Film ===
Mundruczó's first full-length feature This I wish and nothing more won, among other prizes, the award for best first film at the 31st Hungarian Film Week, as well as its Students’ Jury and Directors’ Guild Awards. He directed his short film Afta shortly after leaving school. It went on to win numerous international awards. Pleasant Days, his second feature film, was awarded the Silver Leopard in Locarno in 2002. In 2003, he won the Cinéfondation Program's artistic grant, within the framework of the Cannes International Film Festival, where he developed the screenplay of the film Delta, together with Yvette Bíró in Paris.

He has been a member of the European Film Academy since 2004. In 2005, he won the Nipkow Program's artistic grant to participate for three months in courses and consultations for talented screenwriters and directors in Berlin. His fourth, fifth, and seventh feature-length films were entered in the official competition of Cannes Film Festival: Delta in 2008, Tender Son in 2010 and Jupiter's Moon in 2017. The first won the FIPRESCI Award.

In 2014, his film, White God – which was invited to Cannes Film Festival and made with the support of Eurimages, the European Council's film foundation and the Hungarian National Film Foundation – won the main prize of the Un Certain Regard program at the 67th Cannes Film Festival. Also, the film's canine star won the Palm Dog Award for best performance by a dog. It was screened in the Spotlight section of Sundance Film Festival in 2015.

His first English-language feature, Pieces of a Woman (2020), had its world premiere at the main competition of the 77th Venice International Film Festival, where Vanessa Kirby won the Volpi Cup for Best Actress for her lead performance in the movie. Later she even received a nomination for the Academy Award for Best Actress for the role.

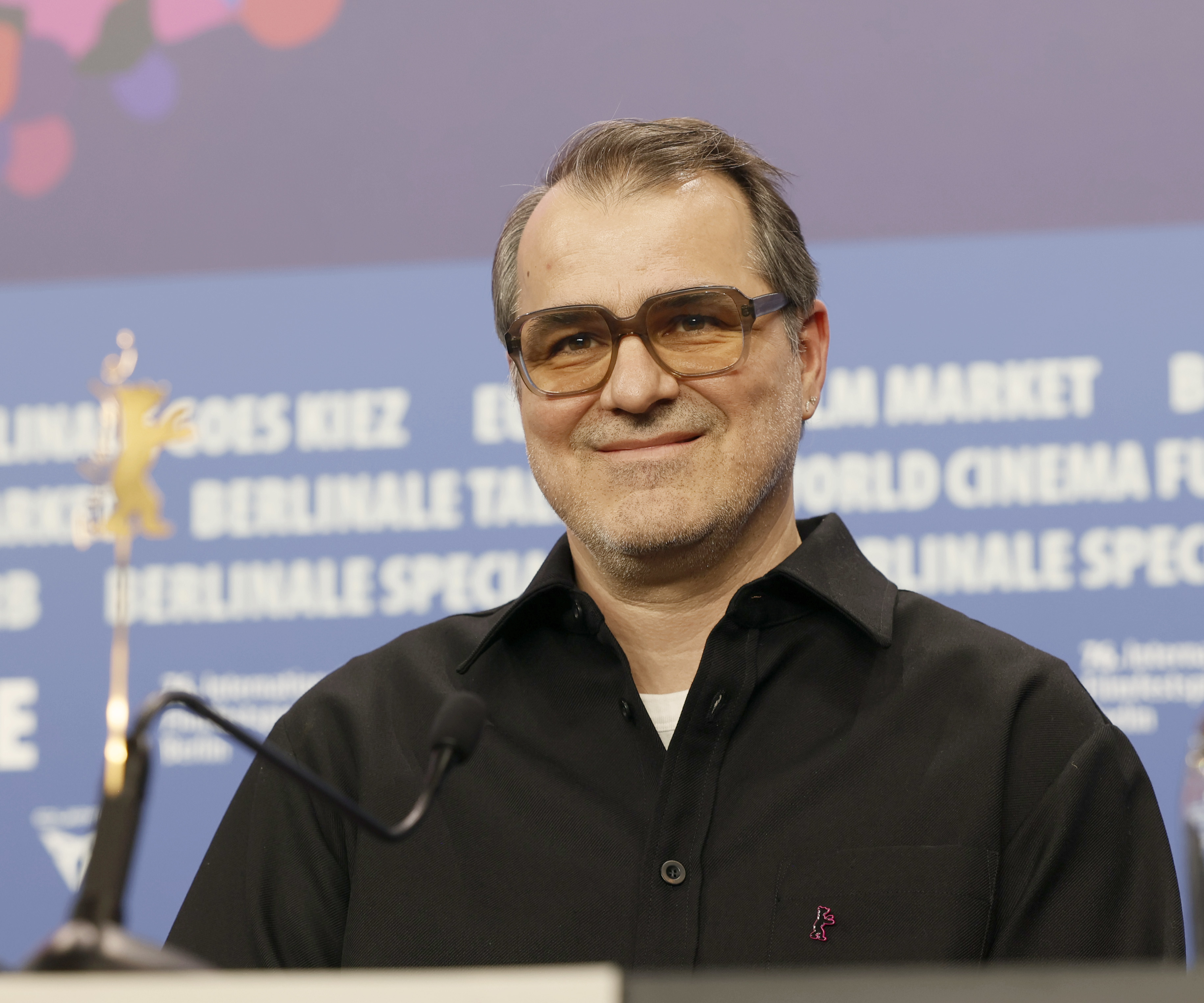
Mundruczó at the 76th Berlin International Film Festival

In 2021, his film Evolution premiered in the Cannes Premiere section of 2021 Cannes Film Festival. Loosely based on his wife, Kata Wéber, family experiences as Holocaust survivors, it follows three generations of a Hungarian Jewish family marked by the World War II.

After a five-year hiatus, Mundruczó returned with his second English-language feature film At the Sea (2026), starring Amy Adams. The film had its world premiere at the main competition of the 76th Berlin International Film Festival, where it was nominated for the Golden Bear.

He followed with Place to Be (also 2026), starring Ellen Burstyn and Taika Waititi. The film will have its world out of competition of the 83rd Venice International Film Festival.

== Personal life ==
Mundruczó is married to Kata Wéber, whom he met when she was an actress at university around the year 2000. They have experienced a miscarriage, which inspired the film Pieces of a Woman. They did not talk about the loss until making the play. They have a daughter.

=== Political views ===
The couple also advocate for the arts in Hungary; after their alma mater was taken over by the government, they wore protest T-shirts at the 77th Venice International Film Festival.

== Filmography ==
=== Feature film ===
Year	English Title	Original Title	Notes
2000	This I Wish and Nothing More	Nincsen nekem vágyam semmi	
2002	Pleasant Days	Szép napok	Silver Leopard at the 55th Locarno Film Festival
2005	Johanna		
2008	Delta		FIPRESCI Award at the 2008 Cannes Film Festival
2010	Tender Son: The Frankenstein Project	Szelíd teremtés: A Frankenstein-terv	
2014	White God	Fehér isten	Un Certain Regard Winner at the 2014 Cannes Film Festival
2017	Jupiter's Moon	Jupiter holdja	
2020	Pieces of a Woman		English language debut
2021	Evolution	Evolúció	
2026	At the Sea		
2026	Place to Be		

=== Short film ===
Year	Film	Notes
2001	AFTA - Day after day	ARTE European Short Award – Oberhausen International Short Film Festival 2001 Prize of the Ecumenical Jury – Honorable Mention – Oberhausen International Short Film Festival 2001
2002	Little Apocrypha no. 1	Prize of the Ecumenical Jury – Oberhausen International Short Film Festival 2003
2003	Joan of Arc on the Night Bus	Director's Fortnight – 2003 Cannes Film Festival
2004	Little Apocrypha no. 2	Cinefondation – 2004 Cannes Film Festival
2005	Lost and Found - Short Lasting Silence	

=== Television ===
Year	Film	Notes
2023	The Crowded Room	Director, 3 episodes

== Theatre ==
Year	Title	Theatre	Notes
2024	Method	Volksbühne, Berlin, Germany	
2024	Parallax	Proton Theatre, Budapest, Hungary	Best director: Kornél Mundruczó – Nestroy Theatre Prize 2024
2022	Minime	Volksbühne, Berlin, Germany	
2021	Krum	Thalia Theatre Hamburg, Germany	
2020	The Seven Deadly Sins/Motherland	Theater Freiburg, Germany; Proton Theatre, Budapest, Hungary	
2019	Evolution	Ruhrtriennale, Bochum, Germany; Proton Theatre, Budapest, Hungary	A performance lying on the boundary between the genres of concert and theatre
2019	Liliom	Thalia Theater, Hamburg, Germany; Salzburger Festspiele, Austria	Suburban legend in seven scenes by Ferenc Molnár (1878–1952)
2018	Pieces of a Woman	TR Warszawa, Poland	Konrad Swinarski Award for the best director of the 2018/2019 season; Best performance – Boska Comedia Theatre Festival 2019. Krakow, Poland
2018	The Raft of the Medusa	Ruhrtriennale, Bochum, Germany; Proton Theatre, Budapest, Hungary	
2017	The Weavers	Thalia Theatre Hamburg, Germany	A play written by the German playwright Gerhart Hauptmann in 1892
2016	Imitation of life	Proton Theatre, Budapest, Hungary	Audience Award – Baltic House Festival 2017. Saint Petersburg, Russia; Nominee for best direction: Kornél Mundruczó – Faust Award 2017.
2015	Winterreise	CAFe Budapest Contemporary Arts Festival; Danubia Orchestra Óbuda; Proton Theatre, Budapest, Hungary	
2014	Hotel Lucky Hole – 3rd part of the suicide trilogy	Schauspielhaus Zürich, Switzerland	
2013	Dementia – 2nd part of the suicide trilogy	Proton Theatre, Budapest, Hungary	Critics’ Award – Baltic House Festival 2014. Saint Petersburg, Russia
2012	The Bat or my Little Cemetery – 1st part of the suicide trilogy	TR Warszawa, Poland	Guarantees of Culture 2012 award in "theatre" category, Telewizja Polska, Poland; Grand Prix of the 53rd Kalisz Theatre Meetings for the actors 2013. Kalisz, Poland; Best performance – Międzynarodowy Festiwal Teatralny "Boska Komedia" (Divine Comedy Festival) 2013. Krakow, Poland
2012	Disgrace	Proton Theatre, Budapest, Hungary	Best direction: Kornél Mundruczó – 13th National Theatre Festival 2013. Pécs, Hungary
2012	Pleasant Days	Theater Oberhausen, Germany	
2011	Betrothal in St. Domingo or my Sweet Haiti	Staatstheater Hannover, Germany	
2011	Time of the Possessed	Thalia Theatre Hamburg, Germany	
2010	Eszter Solymosi of Tiszaeszlár	Staatstheater Hannover, Germany	
2010	Hard to be a God	Proton Theatre, Budapest, Hungary	Price of the Federal Agency for Civic Education – 8th Politics in Independent Theatre; Staatsschauspiel Dresden 2011. Hellerau, Germany; International Association of Theatre Critics (IATC) award – MESS International Theatre Festival 2012. Sarajevo, Bosnia and Herzegovina; MESS Forum "Luka Pavlović" Award by Theatre Critics and Journalists – MESS International Theatre Festival 2012. Sarajevo, Bosnia and Herzegovina; Special Mention of MESS Jury – MESS International Theatre Festival 2012. Sarajevo, Bosnia and Herzegovina
2009	Gospel of Judas	Thalia Theatre Hamburg, Germany	
2007	Frankenstein-project	Bárka Theatre, Budapest, Hungary	Best Performance – 8th National Theatre Festival 2008. Pécs, Hungary; Audience Award – 8th National Theatre Festival 2008. Pécs, Hungary; Special Prize of BITEF – 44th BITEF Festival 2010. Belgrade, Serbia
2006	The Ice	Krétakör Company, Budapest, Hungary	Best young creator: Kornél Mundruczó – XIX. Międzynarodowy International Theatre Festival "Kontakt" 2009. Toruń, Poland; Silver Laurel Wreath Award for Best Performance in the Mittel Europa category – MESS International Theatre Festival 2009. Sarajevo, Bosnia and Herzegovina; The Special Jury Award for Best Ensemble – MESS International Theatre Festival 2009. Sarajevo, Bosnia and Herzegovina; The Avaz Dragon Award – MESS International Theatre Festival 2009. Sarajevo, Bosnia and Herzegovina; Texture Name Prize – Texture Film and Theatre Festival 2010. Perm, Russia
2006	Caligula	Radnóti Theatre, Budapest, Hungary	
2005	Zérus - the poems of Sinead Morrissey	Trafó House of Contemporary Arts, Budapest, Hungary	
2004	Nibelung-Residency	Krétakör Company, Budapest, Hungary	

=== Opera ===
Year	Title	Theatre	Notes
2024	Tosca	Bayerische Staatsoper, Munich, Germany	
2024	Rusalka	Staatsoper Berlin, Germany	
2023	Journey of Hope	Grand-Théâtre de Genève, Switzerland	
2022	Lohengrin	Bayerische Staatsoper, Munich, Germany; Shanghai Opera House, China	
2022	Tannhäuser	Staatsoper Hamburg, Hamburg, Germany	
2021	Sleepless	Staatsoper Berlin, Germany	Best Creation of the Year – Opernwelt, Germany 2022
2016	The Makropulos Affair	Vlaamse Opera, Antwerpen, Belgium	Nominee for best new production – International Opera Awards 2017
2014	Bluebeard's Castle / Winterreise	Vlaamse Opera, Ghent, Belgium	An unconventional combination of two classical works. The sinister tale Bluebeard's Castle by Béla Bartók, which is shaped with astonishing orchestral strength, is juxtaposed with the intimate quietness of the piano notes and singing voice at the heart of Schubert's Winterreise.
2009	Bluebeard's Castle	Budapest Spring Festival, Hungary	
2003	The Respectful Prostitute	Budapest Autumn Festival, Hungary	Kamilló Lendvay's one-act opera, based on Jean-Paul Sartre's drama
