= Politik im Freien Theater =

Politik im Freien Theater is a theatre festival organised by Germany’s Federal Agency for Civic Education. It takes place every three years, each time in a different German city.
