= 36th Karlovy Vary International Film Festival =

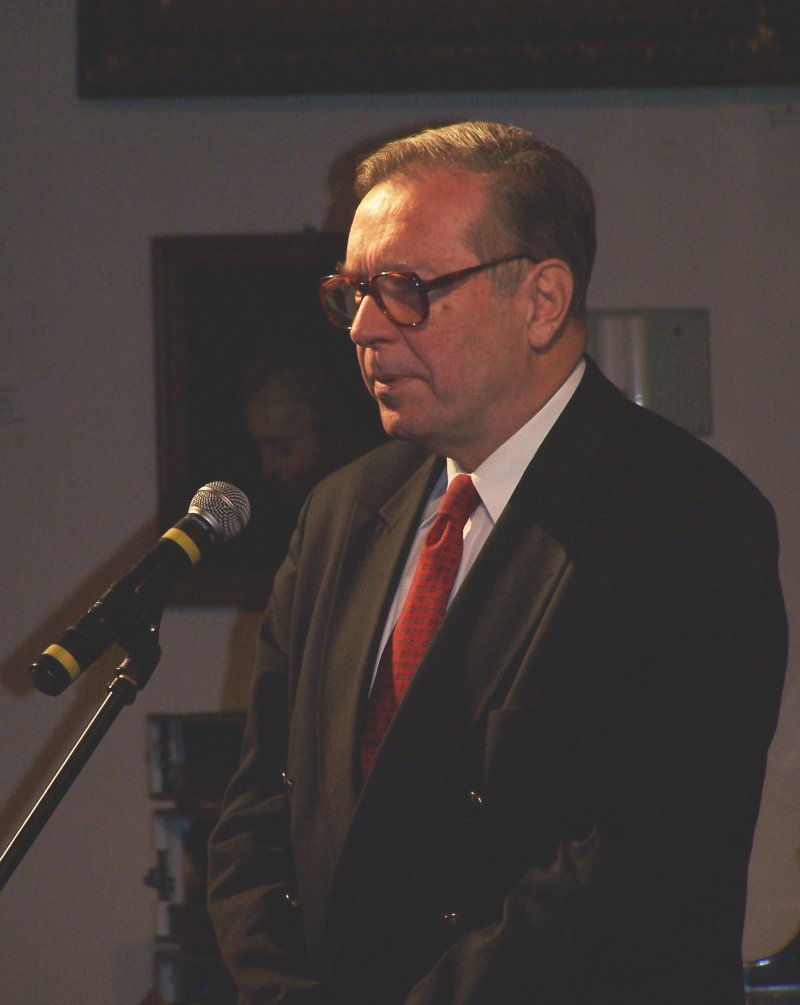
Krzysztof Zanussi, Jury President

The 36th Karlovy Vary International Film Festival took place from 5 to 14 July 2001. The Crystal Globe was won by Amélie, a French romantic comedy film directed by Jean-Pierre Jeunet. The second prize, the Special Jury Prize was won by Hi, Tereska, a Polish drama film directed by Robert Gliński. Polish film and theatre director, producer and screenwriter Krzysztof Zanussi was the president of the jury.

== Juries ==
The following people formed the juries of the festival:

Main competition

- Krzysztof Zanussi, Jury President (Poland)
- Lissy Bellaiche (Denmark)
- Labina Mitevska (Republic of Macedonia)
- Marie-José Nat (France)
- Malti Sahai (India)
- Lee Hall (UK)
- Jan Hřebejk (Czech Republic)
- Jafar Panahi (Iran)

Documentaries

- Erika Gregor, president (Germany)
- Olga Sommerová (Czech Republic)
- Viktor Kossakovskij (Russia)
- Bijidar Manov (Bulgaria)
- Miroljub Vučkovič (Jugoslavia)

== Official selection awards ==
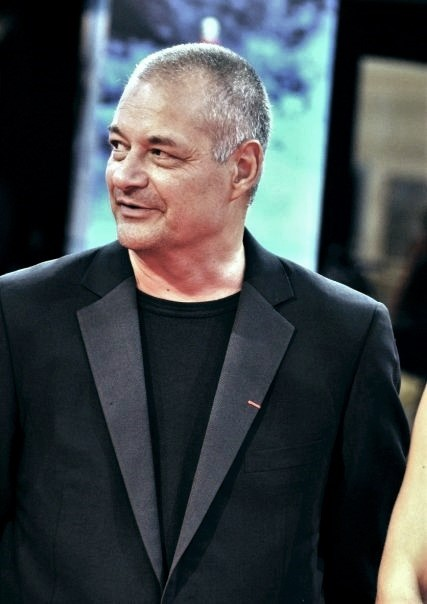
Jean-Pierre Jeunet, director of Amélie

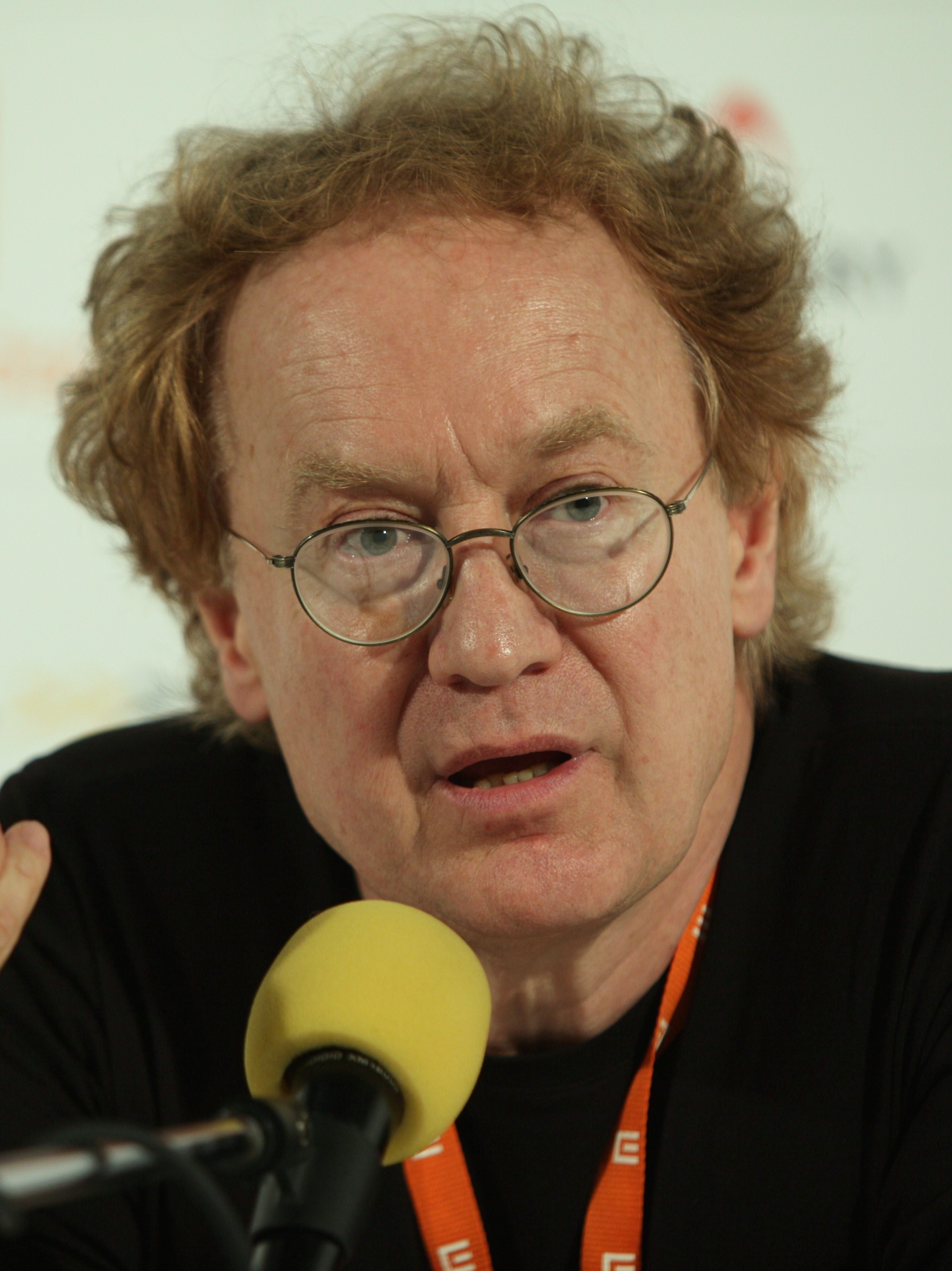
Robert Gliński, director of Hi, Tereska

The following feature films and people received the official selection awards:

- Crystal Globe (Grand Prix) - Amélie (Le Fabuleux Destin d'Amélie Poulain) by Jean-Pierre Jeunet (France, Germany)
- Special Jury Prize - Hi, Tereska (Cześć Tereska) by Robert Gliński (Poland)
- Best Director Award - Ibolya Fekete for Chico (Hungary)
- Best Actress Award - Viveka Seldahl for her role in A Song for Martin (En sång för Martin) (Sweden)
- Best Actor Award - Sven Wollter for his role in A Song for Martin (En sång för Martin) (Sweden)
- Special Jury Mention - The Unfinished Song (Qateh-ye natamam) by Maziar Miri (Iran) & Violet Perfume: No One Is Listening (Perfume de violetas, nadie te oye) by Marisa Sistach (Mexico)

== Other statutory awards ==
Other statutory awards that were conferred at the festival:

- Best documentary film (over 30 min.) - Lives (Vies) by Alain Cavalier (France)
  - Special Jury Mentions - Women at the Turn of the Century (Trapped) by Helena Třeštíková (Czech Republic) & Pavel Kostomarov for cinematography in Poselenije by Sergei Loznitsa
- Best documentary film (under 30 min.) - Noodle Soup (Pho) by Uyen Luu (Vietnam, UK)
- Crystal Globe for Outstanding Artistic Contribution to World Cinema - Ben Kingsley (UK), Otakar Várva (Czech Republic)
- Award of the Karlovy Vary District - Marie-José Nat (France)
- Award of the Town of Karlovy Vary - Bigas Luna (Spain)
- Audience Award - Shrek by Andrew Adamson & Vicky Jenson (USA)

== Non-statutory awards ==
The following non-statutory awards were conferred at the festival:

- FIPRESCI International Critics Award: Hi, Tereska (Cześć Tereska) by Robert Gliński (Poland)
- FICC - The Don Quixote Prize: Hi, Tereska (Cześć Tereska) by Robert Gliński (Poland)
  - Special Mention: Violet Perfume: No One Is Listening (Perfume de violetas, nadie te oye) by Marisa Sistach (Mexico)
- Ecumenical Jury Award: Chico by Ibolya Fekete (Hungary)
  - Special Mention: Ghost World by Terry Zwigoff (USA, UK)
- Philip Morris Film Award: A Place in the World (Mesto na zemle) by Artour Aristakisian (Russia)
- NETPAC Award: Under the Skin of the City (Zir-e poost-e shahr) Rakhshan Bani-E'temad (Iran)
  - Special Mention: Firefly Dreams (Ichiban utsukushî natsu) by John Williams (Japan)
- Best Student Film: Nelásky (Unhappy) by Tomáš Bařina (Czech Republic)
  - Special Mention: The Devouring Eyes by Syllas Tzoumerkas (Greece)
