= Sunset (2018 film) =

Hungarian historical drama film

- Hungarian theatrical release poster
- Directed by: László Nemes
- Written by: László Nemes; Clara Royer; Matthieu Taponier
- Produced by: Gábor Sipos; Gábor Rajna; Barnabás Hutlassa
- Starring: Juli Jakab; Vlad Ivanov; Marcin Czarnik; Evelin Dobos; Judit Bárdos; Christian Harting
- Cinematography: Mátyás Erdély
- Edited by: Matthieu Taponier
- Music by: László Melis
- Production companies: Hungarian National Film Fund; Laokoon Film Arts; Laokoon Filmgroup
- Distributed by: Mozinet
- Release dates: 2 September 2018 (Venice); 27 September 2018 (Hungary)
- Running time: 144 minutes
- Country: Hungary
- Language: Hungarian
- Budget: €8.9 million
- Box office: $1.1 million

Sunset (Hungarian: Napszállta) is a 2018 Hungarian historical drama film co-written and directed by László Nemes. It is set in Budapest before World War I, starring newcomer Juli Jakab and Vlad Ivanov. It premiered at the 75th Venice International Film Festival and was also screened at the 2018 Toronto International Film Festival. It was selected as the Hungarian entry for the Best Foreign Language Film at the 91st Academy Awards, but it was not nominated.

== Plot ==
1913, Budapest, in the heart of Europe. The young Irisz Leiter arrives in the Hungarian capital with high hopes to work as a milliner at the legendary hat store that belonged to her late parents. She is nonetheless sent away by the new owner, Oszkár Brill. While preparations are under way at the Leiter hat store to host guests of uttermost importance, a man abruptly comes to Irisz looking for a certain Kálmán Leiter. Refusing to leave the city, the young woman follows Kálmán's tracks, her only link to a lost past. Her quest brings her through the dark streets of Budapest, where only the Leiter hat store shines, into the turmoil of a civilization on the eve of its downfall.

== Cast ==
- Juli Jakab as Írisz Leiter
- Vlad Ivanov as Oszkár Brill
- Evelin Dobos as Zelma
- Marcin Czarnik as Sándor
- Levente Molnár as Gaspar
- Julia Jakubowska as Countess Rédey
- Christian Harting as Otto von König
- Mihály Kormos as The Caretaker
- Sándor Zsótér as Doctor Herz
- Dorottya Moldován as Lili
- Judit Bárdos as Szeréna
- Susanne Wuest as The Princess
- Tom Pilath as The Prince
- Enrique Keil as Man With Monocle
- Balázs Czukor as Nulla
- Zsolt Nagy as Szilágyi
- Péter Fancsikai as Robert
- Áron Öze as Jubilee Man
- Uwe Lauer as The Colonel
- Urs Rechn as Ismael
- István Pion as Otto von König's Chauffeur
- Björn Freiberg as Man in White

== Production ==
The film received €5 million from the Hungarian National Film Fund and the project is produced by Gabor Sipos and Gabor Rajna through Laokoon Filmgroup. Sunset is being sold and co-produced by French outfit Films Distribution. The film is expected to get support also from Eurimages. Juli Jakab, who plays the protagonist of the film, was chosen among more than 1,000 Hungarian actresses. Shooting took place between 12 June and 2 September 2017 in Hungary.

== Release and reception ==
Sunset premiered in competition at the 75th Venice International Film Festival on 2 September 2018. The film was released in Hungary on 27 September 2018.

On the review aggregator website Rotten Tomatoes, 60% of 93 critics' reviews are positive, with an average rating of 6.8/10. The website's consensus reads: "Sunset (Napszállta) struggles to fill its runtime with consistently compelling drama, but uses one woman's experiences to convincingly capture a society at a crossroads." On Metacritic the film has a weighted average score of 65 out of 100 based on 23 critic reviews, indicating "generally favorable reviews".

== Accolades ==
At the Venice Film Festival, the film won the FIPRESCI Award.

Year	Award	Category	Recipient	Result
2018	75th Venice International Film Festival	FIPRESCI	Sunset	Won

== See also ==
- List of submissions to the 91st Academy Awards for Best Foreign Language Film
- List of Hungarian submissions for the Academy Award for Best Foreign Language Film
