= Orphan (2025 film) =

Hungarian drama film

- Hungarian promotional poster
- Hungarian: Árva
- Directed by: László Nemes
- Written by: László Nemes; Clara Royer
- Produced by: Ildiko Kemeny; Ferenc Szále; Mike Goodridge; Alexander Rodnyansky; Gregory Jankilevitsch
- Starring: Bojtorján Barabas; Grégory Gadebois; Andrea Waskovics
- Cinematography: Mátyás Erdély
- Edited by: Péter Politzer
- Music by: Evgueni Galperine; Sacha Galperine
- Production companies: Pioneer Pictures; Good Chaos; AR Content; Mid March Media; Arte France Cinéma; Pallas Film
- Distributed by: Mozinet (Hungary); Mubi (Germany and United Kingdom); Le Pacte (France)
- Release dates: 28 August 2025 (Venice); 23 October 2025 (Hungary); 11 March 2026 (France); 15 May 2026 (United Kingdom)
- Running time: 133 minutes
- Countries: Hungary; France; Germany; United Kingdom
- Language: Hungarian

Orphan (Hungarian: Árva) is a 2025 historical drama film directed by László Nemes, co-written with Clara Royer. Set in the aftermath of the failed Hungarian uprising against the Communist regime in Budapest, it follows Andor (Bojtorján Barabas), a young Jewish boy in search of his missing father, unveiling instead the truth of his mother's survival during the Holocaust.

The film had its world premiere in the main competition of the 82nd Venice International Film Festival on 28 August 2025, where it was nominated for the Golden Lion. It was theatrically released in Hungary on 23 October. It was also selected as the Hungarian entry for the Best International Feature Film at the 98th Academy Awards, but it was not nominated.

== Plot ==
In 1947, Holocaust survivor Klára reunites with her infant son Andor. During World War II, he had been sent to an orphanage while she had gone into hiding in the countryside.

Ten years later, in the aftermath of the Hungarian Revolution of 1956 against the Communist regime in Budapest, Andor still awaits the return of his father, whom he believes is alive. After being advised by Géza to wait for his father in the central station, Andor is briefly arrested by the police alongside many teenagers believed to be sympathisers of the failed revolution, but is quickly discharged after Klára informs the police officer he is unaware his father was sent to a "camp" during the war.

Andor meets Sári near a football field, where they find a loaded gun hidden in a tree, and learns that her elder brother Tamás is hiding in ruins of an old building in central Budapest, while the ÁVH searches for the last surviving revolutionaries. Their mother and Klára's colleague, Elza, secretly instructs Sári to keep visiting Tamás until the possibility of a safe exit abroad arises, while she cares for her husband who was left in a catatonic state following the Holocaust.

Trying to reconnect with his Jewish heritage, Andor attends the local synagogue where his father used to go, but seems to not understand (or accept) his fate. He later gives Tamás the gun.

Mihály Berend, the man who hid Klára in the countryside during the war, locates her and pushes for a relationship. He suggests taking Andor as a legitimate son, generating conflicted feelings. Klara feels indebted to him for saving her life, while Andor can't accept having his father's memory erased. Berend's erratic behavior terrifies both of them. Andor steals money from Klára's grocery story boss and travels to Berény, where he learns about Berend's former wife and their infant son, whom he had tied up in the attic. Berend takes him back to Budapest, where Klára has just been fired and humiliated by her boss.

Géza meets Klára and Berend at a restaurant, but doesn't accept her relationship with the man who demanded money to save her. Meanwhile her non-Jewish neighbours appreciate Berend's persona as strong and protective. Berend arranges a birth certificate rectification to change Andor's surname from Hirsch to Berend, which Andor emphatically resists tearing up the new certificate. Berend responds by violently destroying the house and beating Klára.

Andor runs to Tamás' hiding place and takes back the gun, Tamás follows him but is killed by ÁVH. Berend takes Andor and Sári to an amusement park, where Sári reveals Tamás would be taken out of Budapest to "America" that night. Distressed, Andor goes armed into the Ferris wheel with Berand, but hesitates and doesn't shoot him.

== Cast ==
- Bojtorján Barabas as Andor Hirsch
- Grégory Gadebois as Mihály Berend
- Andrea Waskovics as Klára
- Elíz Szabó as Sári
- Soma Sándor as Tamás
- Hermina Fátyol as Elza
- Marcin Czarnik as Géza Perlmann

== Production ==
The film is directed by László Nemes. As with his previous films, Sunset (2018) and Son of Saul (2015), Nemes co-wrote the script with Clara Royer. It is produced by Ildiko Kemeny and Ferenc Szale for Pioneer Pictures, alongside Mike Goodridge for the UK's Good Chaos, Alexander Rodnyansky of AR Content, and Gregory Jankilevitsch of Mid March Media. The cast is led by Bojtorján Barabas, Grégory Gadebois and Andrea Waskovics.

The story is loosely based on Nemes' own father's childhood memories in post-war Budapest, specially his search for his biological father shortly after the failed Hungarian Revolution in a Soviet-occupied Hungarian People's Republic.

=== Filming ===
Principal photography took place in Budapest over ten weeks, concluding in September 2024. It's Nemes' third feature film collaboration with cinematographer Mátyás Erdély, who shot it in 35mm film and in the 1.33:1 aspect ratio, using Arricam LT cameras and two full sets ARRI/Zeiss Ultra Prime lenses.

== Release ==
In May 2024, Mubi acquired distribution rights in a host of countries including the UK and Ireland, Germany, Austria, Switzerland, Benelux, Latin America and Turkey. The film was theatrically released in Hungary on 23 October 2025. The film was released in France on 11 March 2026, followed by its release on 15 May in the United Kingdom and Ireland.

== Reception ==
=== Critical response ===
On the review aggregator website Rotten Tomatoes, 67% of 12 critics' reviews are positive, with an average rating of 6.9/10.

=== Awards and nominations ===
Award	Date of ceremony	Category	Recipient(s)	Result	Ref.
Venice International Film Festival	September 6, 2025	Golden Lion	László Nemes	Nominated	

== See also ==
- List of submissions to the 98th Academy Awards for Best International Feature Film
- List of Hungarian submissions for the Academy Award for Best International Feature Film
