= Mátyás Erdély =

Hungarian cinematographer

Mátyás Erdély (born 17 September 1976) is a Hungarian cinematographer.

== Filmography ==
=== Feature film ===
Year	Title	Director	Notes
2001	Chico	Ibolya Fekete	With Antonio Farías and Nyika Jancsó
2001	Macerás ügyek	Szabolcs Hajdu	
2005	Johanna	Kornél Mundruczó	With Nagy András
2008	Delta	Kornél Mundruczó	
2010	Tender Son: The Frankenstein Project	Kornél Mundruczó	
2011	Miss Bala	Gerardo Naranjo	
2012	The Woman Who Brushed Off Her Tears	Teona Strugar Mitevska	
2014	Kenau	Maarten Treurniet	
2014	The Quiet Ones	John Pogue	
2015	James White	Josh Mond	
2015	Son of Saul	László Nemes	
2018	Sunset	László Nemes	
2020	The Nest	Sean Durkin	
2023	Foe	Garth Davis	
2023	The Iron Claw	Sean Durkin	
2025	Orphan	László Nemes	
2026	Moulin	László Nemes	Post-production
2027	Blood on Snow †	Cary Joji Fukunaga	Post-production
2027	Deep Cuts †	Sean Durkin	Post-production

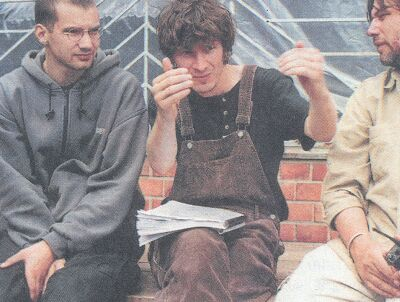

=== Television ===
Year	Title	Director	Notes
2000	Valaki kopog	Szabolcs Hajdu; György Pálfi	2 episodes
2005	A Mester és Margarita	Ibolya Fekete	TV movie
2007	Egy nö igaz története	Marcell Iványi	TV movie
2011	aurA	Pater Sparrow	3 episodes
2013	Southcliffe	Sean Durkin	Miniseries

== Awards and nominations ==
Year	Award	Category	Title	Result	Notes
2015	American Society of Cinematographers	Spotlight Award	Son of Saul	Won	Tied with Adam Arkapaw for Macbeth
2015	Camerimage	Bronze Frog	Son of Saul	Won	
2015	Camerimage	Golden Frog	Son of Saul	Nominated	
2015	Dublin Film Critics' Circle	Best Cinematography	Son of Saul	5th place	Tied with Natasha Braier for The Neon Demon
2020	British Independent Film Awards	Best Cinematography	The Nest	Nominated	
