= Marcin Czarnik =

Polish actor (born 1976)

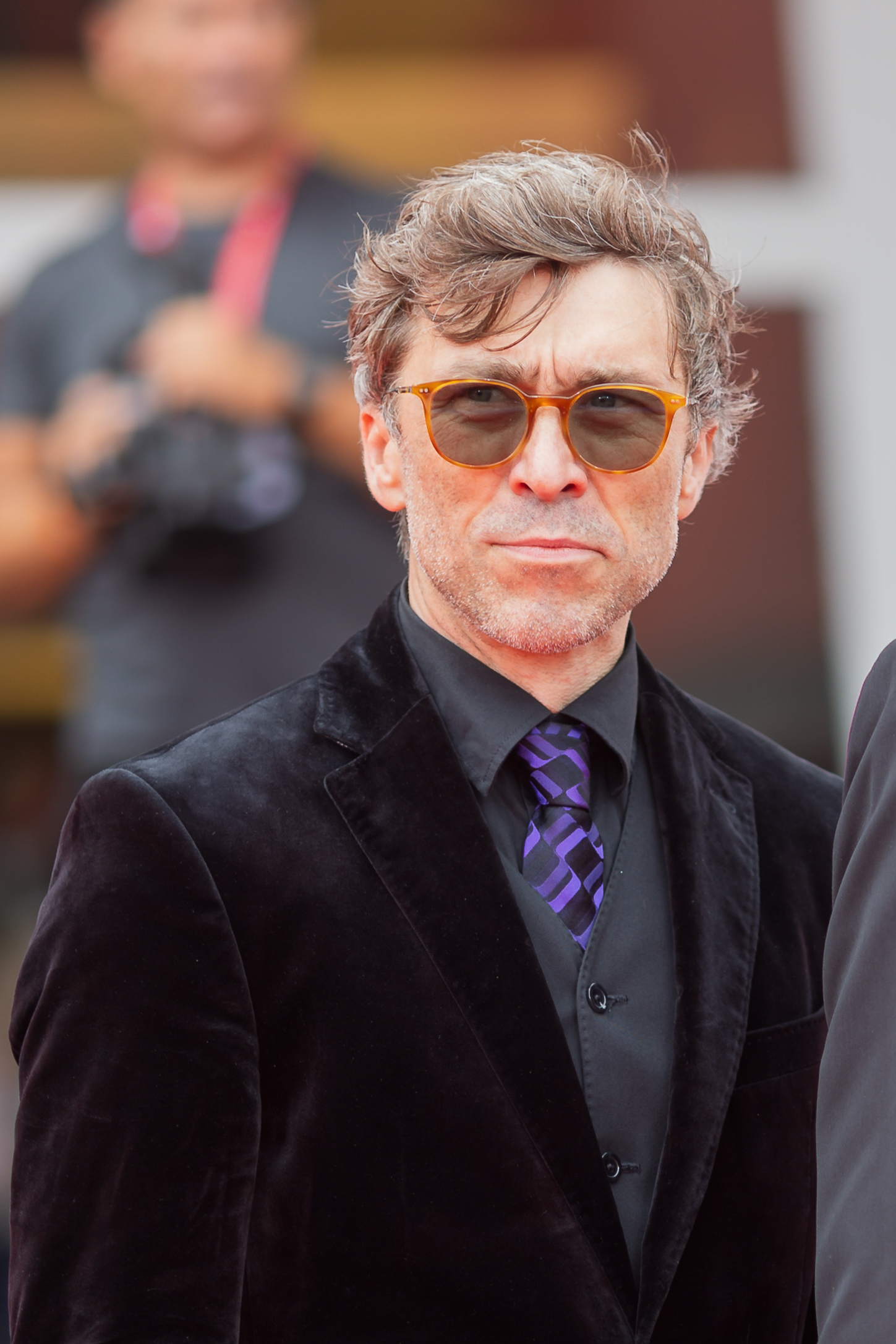
- Czarnik in 2025
- Born: 23 March 1976 (age 50); Oświęcim, Poland
- Occupation: Actor

Marcin Czarnik (born 23 March 1976) is a Polish actor, best known for his collaborations with the Hungarian filmmaker László Nemes, appearing in all his feature films, including the Academy Award-winning Son of Saul (2015).

== Biography ==
Graduating from the Warsaw Theatre Academy in 2000, Czarnik performed at the Polish Theatre in Wrocław from 2002 to 2004 and again in 2006, and at the Wybrzeże Theatre in Gdańsk from 2004 to 2005. In 2011, he was awarded the Medal for Merit to Culture – Gloria Artis.

== Selected filmography ==
=== Film ===
Year	Title	Role	Notes
2009	Janosik: A True Story	Brewer	
2009	Reverse	secret police officer at general's	
2010	Little Rose		
2013	Traffic Department	Walczak	
2015	Son of Saul	Feigenbaum	
2016	United States of Love	Robert	
2018	Playing Hard	Dominik	
2018	Clergy	journalist	
2018	Sunset	Sandor	
2019	Piłsudski	Horwitz	
2019	Mr. Jones	Paul Kleb	
2020	The Champion	Bruno	
2024	White Courage	the partisan "Piorun"	
2025	Zaprawdę Hitler umarł	Black Berek	
2025	Orphan	Géza Perlmann	
2026	Moulin	Raymond Aubrac	

=== Television ===
List of television appearances, with year, title, and role shown
Year	Title	Role	Notes
2001–2002	Marzenia do spełnienia	Tomasz Lisowski	
2004	First Love	Bogdan	1 episode
2005	The Magic Tree	operator	1 episode
2005–2007	Fala zbrodni	Tarhan	3 episodes
2007	Tylko miłość	man in the park	1 episode
2008	Crime Detectives	Wojtek Konopski	1 episode
2008	The Londoners	Mariusz	1 episode
2008–2015	Barwy szczęścia	Robert Romanowski	252 episodes
2009–2012	Father Matthew	Marcin Piasecki	2 episodes
2010	1920. Wojna i miłość	Police officer	3 episodes
2010	Rookie	Drug dealer	1 episode
2011–2013	Głęboka woda	Eryk Petrus	6 episodes
2012	True Law	Paweł Fabiański	1 episode
2012	Days of Honor	Stefan Kurek	1 episode
2012	Galeria	Bonzo	2 episodes
2015	Na dobre i na złe	Jeremi	1 episode
2016	Artyści	Marcin Konieczny	8 episodes
2017	Belle Epoque	Adam Rawski	5 episodes
2018	1983	actor reciting "The Great Improvisation"	1 episode
2018	Pułapka	Adam Konarski	5 episodes
2018	Nielegalni	Jakub Kurc	6 episodes
2019	The Witcher	Ronin Mage	1 episode
2020	Bez skrupułów	Leon "Smok" Smoczyński	5 episodes
2020	The Elements of Sasza – Fire	Piotr "Duch" Duchnowski	5 episodes
2021	Open Your Eyes	Piotr	6 episodes
2022	Tajemnica zawodowa	Piotr Kepa	7 episodes
2022	Nieobecni	Pawel Skrzynski	4 episodes
2022	Erin	Mosze Kiczales	4 episodes
2023	Sortownia	Robert Tracz	6 episodes
2023	Lokatorka	Rafal Andrzejewski	9 episodes
2024	Gra z Cieniem	Adam Dubelski	12 episodes
