= The Year I Lost My Mind =

2017 German LGBTQ+ mystery/thriller film

- Theatrical film poster
- German: Jahr des Tigers
- Directed by: Tor Iben
- Written by: Tor Iben
- Produced by: Seth B. Goldberg; Tor Iben; Julia Kühne
- Starring: Alexander Tsypilev; Julien Lickert
- Cinematography: Florian Banicki
- Edited by: Robert Von Wroblewsky
- Music by: Bartosz Bludau
- Release dates: October 27, 2017 (Hofer Filmtage); April 1, 2018 (Germany)
- Running time: 85 minutes
- Country: Germany
- Language: German

The Year I Lost My Mind (German: Jahr des Tigers) is a 2017 German LGBTQ+ thriller/mystery film, directed by Tor Iben. The film stars Alexander Tsypilev and Julien Lickert. It premiered at the Hof International Film Festival in 2017, before being in limited theatrical release in select cities throughout the Germany the following year.

== Synopsis ==
A lonely young man becomes dangerously obsessed with a stranger. After encountering him during a burglary, Tom begins stalking and antagonizing the attractive young Lars. When Lars finds out about Tom's intentions, he manages to turn the tables on him, leading to a shocking confrontation.

== Cast ==
- Alexander Tsypilev as Tom
- Julien Lickert as Lars
- Patrick G. Boll as Rachid
- Astrid Kohrs as Elvira
- Eva Nürnberg as Tyra
- Toni Kadrija as Tobi
- Michael Del Coco as Daniel
- Christian Harting as Tim

== Reception ==
Pip Ellwood-Hughes of Entertainment Focus commended the acting: "Alexander Tsypilev plays creepy very well and he's unnerving when he's on-screen. Julien Lickert on the other-hand gives a more reserved performance, smouldering as the camera lingers on his handsome face and impressive physique." Zachary Wild of The Rectangular View rated it 2.5/5 stars, but lauded the quality imagery: "Despite having very little dialog, the film manages to get it's point across with mood and visuals. Tom's interest in masks is a kink, and one that he takes outside of the bedroom."
