= Miklós Nyiszli =

Jewish prisoner at the Auschwitz concentration camp (1901–1956)

- Born: 17 June 1901; Szilágysomlyó, Austria-Hungary
- Died: 5 May 1956 (aged 54); Oradea, Romania
- Citizenship: Hungarian; Romanian
- Known for: Forced medical labor at Auschwitz

Miklós Nyiszli (17 June 1901 – 5 May 1956) was a Hungarian-Romanian prisoner of Jewish heritage at Auschwitz concentration camp. Nyiszli, his wife, and young daughter, were transported to Auschwitz in June 1944. Upon his arrival, Nyiszli volunteered as a forensic doctor and was sent to work at No. 12 barracks where he mainly performed autopsies. He was under the supervision of Josef Mengele, a Schutzstaffel officer and physician.

Mengele decided after observing Nyiszli's skills to move him to a specially built autopsy and operating theatre. The room had been built inside Crematorium II, and Nyiszli, along with members of the 12th Sonderkommando, was housed there.

== Early life ==
Nyiszli was born 17 June 1901 in Szilágysomlyó, Kingdom of Hungary (then the Hungarian-half of Austria-Hungary). He completed his medical degree in 1929. Following this, he specialized in forensic pathology in Germany. He returned to Transylvania (which became part of Romania in 1920) with his wife and daughter in 1937 before migrating to Hungary in 1940. In 1942, he and his family were sent to a work camp in Desze before being transferred to Auschwitz concentration camp on 29 May 1944.

== Accounts of camp life ==
While imprisoned, Josef Mengele forced him to engage in human experimentation, including dissecting the bodies of recently executed inmates, due to his scientific background. At one point Nyiszli was forced to carry out physical exams on a father-son pair and, after their deaths, to prepare their skeletons for study at the Anthropological Museum in Berlin.

[I] had to examine them with exact clinical methods before they died, and then perform the dissection on their still warm bodies.

One day, following the gassing of a transport load of prisoners, Nyiszli was summoned by the Sonderkommando working in the gas chambers who had found a girl alive under a mass of bodies in a chamber. Nyiszli and his fellow prisoners did their best to help and care for the girl, but she was eventually discovered and shot.

Nyiszli was appalled by the disregard for human life and lack of empathy for human suffering shown by the guards and officers. However, his actions were dictated by his tormentors, and he was forced to perform what he considered immoral acts. As he said:

An event never before experienced in the history of medicine worldwide is realized here: Twins die at the same time, and there is the possibility of subjecting their corpses to an autopsy. Where in normal life is there the case, bordering on a miracle, that twins die at the same place at the same time? [...] A comparative autopsy is thus absolutely impossible under normal conditions. But in Auschwitz camp there are several hundred pairs of twins, and their deaths, in turn, present several hundred opportunities!"

In his 1945 deposition, Nyiszli testified that he watched Mengele kill 14 twins in a single night, first by injecting evipan to induce sleep, and then injecting their hearts with chloroform. In contrast, in his book Nyiszli states that he discovered Mengele's method of killings after he smelled chloroform in the hearts of twins he dissected, and stated: "a shudder of fear ran through me. If Dr. Mengele had any idea that I had discovered the secret of his injections he would send ten doctors, in the name of the political SS, to attest to my death".

During his roughly eight months in Auschwitz, Nyiszli observed the murders of tens of thousands of people, including the slaughter of whole sub-camps at once. These sub-camps held different ethnic, religious, national, and gender groups, including a Romani camp, several women's camps, and a Czech camp. Each sub-camp housed between 5,000 and 10,000 prisoners or more. Nyiszli was often told which camps were next to be exterminated, signaling that an increased workload was imminent.

When Nyiszli discovered that the women's camp in which his wife and daughter were kept prisoner, Camp C, was to be liquidated, he bribed an SS officer to transfer them to a women's work camp. Nyiszli remained in Auschwitz until shortly before its liberation by the Soviet army on 27 January 1945. On 18 January, Nyiszli, along with an estimated 66,000 other prisoners, was forced on a death march through various Nazi territories and further into various smaller concentration camps in Germany.

Despite this, he generally kept silent about the atrocities and often concealed the true causes of death of certain prisoners. He feared that he would be executed himself if he exposed the truth.

According to Marius Turda, Nyiszli narrated his testimony of camp life in an objective tone, favoring an analytical approach over a more emotive description. He writes that he tells his story "not as a reporter but as a doctor". This style has been referred to by some as documentary realism.

Jean-Claude Pressac reviewed Nyiszli's account of the extermination procedures at Auschwitz, concluding that he made a number of errors.

== Authorship ==
During Nyiszli's period in the camp, he witnessed many atrocities to which he refers in his book, Auschwitz: A Doctor’s Eyewitness Account, also published under the name Auschwitz: An Eyewitness Account of Mengele's Infamous Death Camp. Historian Gideon Greif characterized Nyiszli's assertion that "soap and towels were handed out to the victims" as they entered the gas chambers and that "toxic gas was released from the showerheads" as among the “myths and other wrong and defamatory accounts” of the Sonderkommando that flourished in the absence of first-hand testimony by surviving Sonderkommando members.

== After Auschwitz ==
Nyiszli's first major stop after the forced march out of Auschwitz was the Mauthausen concentration camp in northern Austria, near the city of Linz. After a three-day stay in a quarantine barracks at Mauthausen, he spent two months in the Melk an der Donau concentration camp, about three hours away by train.

After 12 months of imprisonment, Nyiszli and his fellow prisoners were liberated on 5 May 1945, when U.S. troops reached the camp. Nyiszli's wife and daughter also survived Auschwitz and were liberated from Bergen Belsen. He never again worked with a scalpel after the war.

He wrote the book Dr. Mengele boncolóorvosa voltam az auschwitzi krematóriumban (I was Dr. Mengele's autopsy doctor in the Auschwitz crematorium).

== Death ==
Nyiszli died of a heart attack on 5 May 1956 in Oradea, Romania. His widow, Margareta, died on 5 September 1985.

== Dramatization ==
- Auschwitz Lullaby, a 1998 play by James C. Wall, printed: 2000 ISBN 0-87129-826-0; audiocassette & CD: 2000, ISBN 1-889889-02-4
- The Grey Zone, a 2001 film by Tim Blake Nelson
- Son of Saul, a 2015 film by László Nemes

== See also ==
- Sanitätswesen
- Max Planck Society

== Bibliography ==
- Nyiszli, Miklós (2011). Auschwitz: A Doctor's Eyewitness Account. New York: Arcade Publishing. ISBN 978-1611450118.
- Nyiszli, Miklós (2010). I was doctor Mengele's assistant. Oswiecim. ISBN 978-8392156758.
