= Tibor Gáspár =

Hungarian actor

- Born: 2 September 1957 (age 68); Szentes, Hungary
- Occupation: Actor
- Years active: 1978-present

Tibor Gáspár (born 2 September 1957) is a Hungarian actor. He appeared in more than sixty films since 1978. His brother Sándor Gáspár is also an actor.

== Selected filmography ==
Year	Title	Role	Notes
2004	After the Day Before		
2009	Intimate Headshot	Akos	
2015	Mom and Other Loonies in the Family	Lajos Barkó	
