= Eduardo Rózsa-Flores =

Bolivian-Hungarian-Croatian mercenary, journalist, actor

- Rózsa-Flores Eduardo
- Born: 31 March 1960; Santa Cruz de la Sierra, Bolivia
- Died: 16 April 2009 (aged 49); Santa Cruz de la Sierra, Bolivia
- Cause of death: Assassination by gunshot
- Resting place: Sacred Heart of Jesus Cemetery, Santa Cruz de la Sierra, Bolivia
- Other name: Rózsa György Eduardo
- Citizenship: Bolivian; Hungarian; Croatian
- Education: Eötvös Loránd University
- Occupations: Soldier; journalist; actor; intelligence agent (alleged)
- Years active: (1989-2009)
- Political party: KISZ (1975-1990)
- Military career
- Allegiance: Croatia
- Branch: Croatian National Guard (1991); Croatian Army (1991–1994)
- Nickname: Chico
- Conflicts: Croatian War of Independence

Eduardo Rózsa-Flores (Hungarian: Rózsa-Flores Eduardo; 31 March 1960 – 16 April 2009) was a Bolivian-Hungarian-Croatian soldier, journalist, actor, poet, writer, and alleged intelligence agent.

Accused of leading a terrorist organization that intended to assassinate President Evo Morales and Vice President Álvaro García Linera, Rózsa-Flores was killed by Bolivian Police during a raid on the Hotel Las Américas.

== Early life ==
Eduardo Rózsa-Flores was born in Santa Cruz de la Sierra, Bolivia. His father, György Obermayer Rózsa, was a Hungarian Jewish painter, who left Hungary in 1948, moving first to Paris, and, in 1952, to Bolivia with a French ethnographic mission, adopting the forename Jorge. He stayed on, lecturing art, and married Nelly Flores Arias, a Catalan immigrant and high school teacher. A committed communist, Jorge Rózsa moved the family to Chile to escape the Hugo Banzer dictatorship in 1972, but emigrated to Sweden in 1973 after Augusto Pinochet came to power. In 1974, they moved to Hungary.

Rózsa-Flores attended secondary school in Budapest. After military service, he went for a short period of intelligence training at the Felix Dzerzhinsky KGB Academy in the Soviet Union. He later joined the Hungarian intelligence services. He attended Eötvös Loránd University (ELTE), earning his degree in 1991. He was the last Secretary of the Communist Youth Organization at ELTE in 1990. He allegedly had cooperated with the Hungarian secret services as a student. Allegedly, he was once the interpreter for "Carlos" Ilich Ramirez Sanchez, who resided for a time in Hungary. His first journalism work was for Cuba's Prensa Latina. He was a founding member of the Hungarian Jewish Cultural Association, editor of jobbik.net, contributor to the magazines Kapu and Leleplező, and founding editor-in-chief of Ellenkultúra.info. In the late 1980s he reportedly joined Opus Dei, after which he embraced Islam.

== War ==
At the start of the Croatian War of Independence, Rózsa-Flores – known then as Jorge Eduardo Rózsa – worked as a correspondent for the Barcelona newspaper La Vanguardia and the Spanish unit of the BBC World Service. He arrived in Yugoslavia in June 1991, initially sympathetic to the Yugoslav cause. While reporting on and witnessing the war there, during which his car was shot at, he began seeing the Croats as the victims.

In the autumn of 1991, he joined the Croatian National Guard in Osijek as its first foreign volunteer, and he took part in several battles in Slavonia, mostly defending Laslovo, where he set up the Croatian army's First International Unit.

He later served as a commander of the special forces. He was wounded three times in battle and obtained the rank of colonel in 1993. Unconfirmed press reports have linked him to the deaths of two foreign journalists also in Croatia at that time, Swiss national Christian Würtenberg (who was in the First International Unit) and British photographer Paul Jenks.

He was promoted to major and then to a colonel in the Croatian Army. He was officially demobilised on 31 July 1994. His wartime nickname in the Croatian War of Independence was "Chico".

== Later life and death ==
Rózsa-Flores obtained Croatian citizenship. After the war, he mostly lived in Budapest.

Chico was the title of a feature film based on his life, in which he starred.

He is believed to have been involved in the leaking of a speech by Ferenc Gyurcsány. The editor-in-chief of Kapu magazine (who distributed the material in the Hungarian press) said that he received the audio material from him.

On 16 April 2009, Bolivian police killed Rózsa-Flores during a raid in the Las Americas hotel in Santa Cruz. Two others, a Hungarian national, Árpád Magyarosi and an Irish citizen, Michael Martin Dwyer, were also killed. Two others, Mario Tadić, a Croatian, and Előd Tóásó, a Hungarian – were arrested. Bolivian authorities said that Rózsa-Flores was the leader of a terrorist group which intended to assassinate Bolivian president Evo Morales. In 2011, members of the Police unit that performed the raid were awarded the Medal of Valor.

After 10 years of investigation, the trial is not over, and the opposition leaders claim that the terrorism issue was planned and financed by the government to persecute the principal leaders of the opposition as Branko Marinković. They argue that the case is not founded and, based on the law, it should be dismissed following the process prescribed.

== Last interview (Különös Történetek) ==
On 21 April 2009, Magyar Televízió (Hungarian television) broadcast an interview recorded in September 2008 by Hungarian journalist András Kepes prior to his last trip to Bolivia, and asked Kepes not to release the interview until he returned or in case something happened to him. He claimed in the interview that he was asked by the Bolivian opposition to help organise the defence of the city of Santa Cruz, drawing on his previous military experience. The city's leaders feared attacks from the central authorities and militias they had fomented. He also claimed that they were not preparing for offensive but defensive combat. He also said that he was not accepting any payment for the mission, which he undertook out of a sense of commitment, as he felt obliged to help his homeland.

== Bibliography ==
- Mocskos háború [The Filthy War] (Bereményi Könyvkiadó, 1994 ISBN 963-00-7069-3)
- Hallgatás hadművelet [Writings from the Yugoslav War 1991-1996] (H-Elen 55 Szolgáltató 1996 ISBN 963-04-7550-2)
- Meghaltunk, és mégis élünk [We Died but Still We Live On] (Alexandra Könyvkiadó, Pécs 1998 ISBN 963-367-642-8)
- Hűség – Vjernost – Lealtad [Loyalty: Verses from War 1991-1996] (Magyar Kapu Alapítvány 1999 ISBN 963-7706-21-6)
- Állapot: Két háború között [Condition: Between Two Wars] (Magyar a Magyarért Alapítvány 2001 ISBN 963-00-7069-3)
- Disznóságok gyűjteménye [Swine Collection] (Magyar a Magyarért Alapítvány 2003 ISBN 963-206-971-4)
- 69 titok, szerelmes versek és egy magyarázat [69 Secrets, Love Poems and an Explanation] (Magyar a Magyarért Alapítvány 2004)
- 47 szúfi vers [47 Sufi Verses] (Magyar a Magyarért Alapítvány2007)

== Films ==
- Bolse Vita (1996)
- Vizualizáció (1997)
- Kisváros (TV series) (1997) as "Karvaly"
- Chico (2001), in the lead role
