= Sándor Zsótér =

Hungarian actor and screenwriter (born 1961)

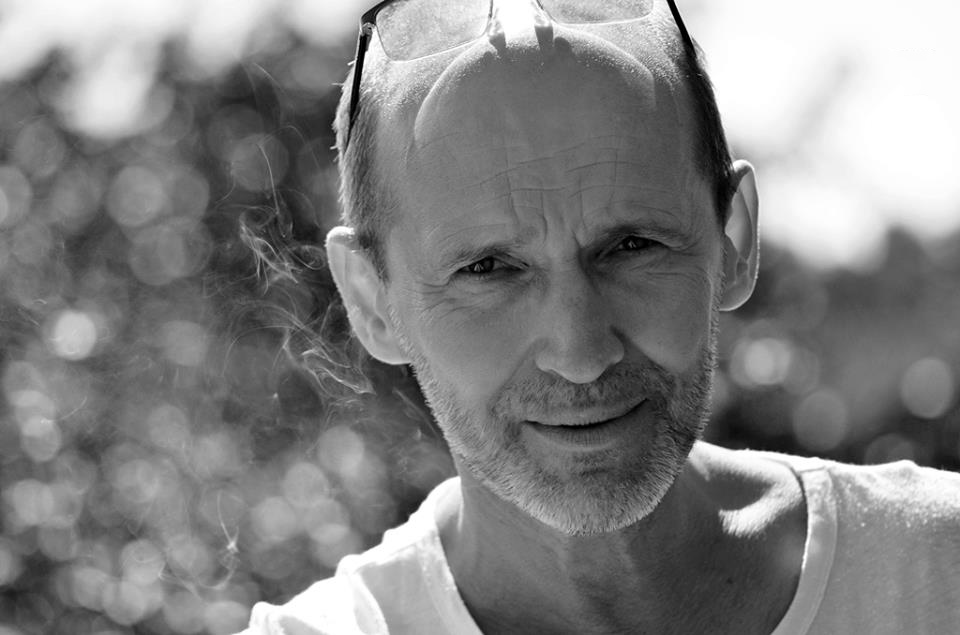
Sándor Zsótér, photo by Gáspár Stekovics

Sándor Zsótér (born 20 June 1961, Budapest) is a Kossuth Prize-winning Hungarian actor, playwright, director, and an associate professor at the Academy of Drama and Film in Budapest.

He is notable for playing the role of the witness doctor Miklós Nyiszli in the 2016 Academy Award-winning film Son of Saul (2015), and for his role as Gyuri in the 1983 FIPRESCI award-winning film Szerencsés Dániel.

== Biography ==
His parents were Sándor Zsótér Sr. and Éva Mali. Zsótér was part of the Drama Faculty at the Academy of Drama and Film in Budapest, graduating in 1983. He first, between 1983 and 1985, performed at the Hevesi Sándor Theatre in Zalaegerszeg. He then played at the Szigligeti Szolnok Theatre between 1985 and 1986, the Miklós Radnóti Theatre in Budapest between 1986 and 1990, and, between 1990 and 1992, at the Zsigmond Móricz Theatre at Nyíregyháza. Between 1992 and 1994, he was the director at the National Theatre of Miskolc and, between 1994 and 1996, was the main organizer at the Szigligeti Szolnok Theatre. Since 1996, he has been an instructor at the Academy of Drama and Film in Budapest. In 1996, he contracted the National Theatre of Szeged, and in 1999, the Miklós Radnóti Theatre. Since 2008, he has been a member of the Géza Gárdonyi Theatre in Eger.

He has been a guest of - among others - the National Theatre in Budapest, the Comedy Theatre of Budapest, the Hungarian State Opera House, the József Katona Theatre, and the Chalk Circle Theatre.
