= With a Little Patience =

- Directed by: László Nemes
- Produced by: András Muhi
- Starring: Virág Marjai
- Cinematography: Mátyás Erdély
- Release date: 2007
- Running time: 14 minutes
- Country: Hungary
- Language: none

With a Little Patience (Hungarian: Türelem, lit. "Patience") is a Hungarian short film made in 2007, written and directed by László Nemes. It depicts the daily routine of an office clerk keeping records and thus assisting extermination efforts in the course of the Shoah.

== Plot ==
A slender white woman wearing a white blouse and plain gray skirt comes out of a forest approaching a building. At the door threshold she stops short and is handed a piece of jewelry by an unrecognizable person which she puts in her breast pocket. Upon entering the building she hands over a card to a clerk and her arrival is recorded with a stamp and signature. In the single floor makeshift office building she walks to another desk getting some files stamped. Making a stop at her locker she shortly examines the jewelry she was given earlier, and proceeds to an open-plan office area picking up an object from a set of pigeon holes on her way.

Eventually she takes a seat at her desk: She organizes files, reads notes on the back of black-and-white pictures, and minutely takes notes. Suddenly a group of men enter and walk down the hallway. A woman in the background quickly gets up and stands at attention, until they walk past her. One of the men asks the main character to hand over a document, which she complies with. In a brief moment she looks at the piece of jewelry again and shortly tries it on her, but quickly hides it as another office clerk walks by.

She resumes her work but gets distracted by hearing a person sobbing outside in the distance. Investigating the cause, the main character slowly goes to a window where she (and the viewer) sees an elderly woman disorientedly walking toward the building in search for help. Two men come to her assistance and gently talk to her leading her back to the forest where she came from.

The group is spotted and a prisoner runs to them pushing them into a certain direction. The camera slowly pans to the right ultimately revealing the movie’s historical context: At the edge of the forest Jews are rounded up, forced to get undressed and surrender their belongings. Soldiers and a General with a Nazi-bandage supervise the situation. The General struts past the office building where the main character closes the window. She walks out of the frame and the camera is moving backward granting only view to a piece of the forest. “Absent” performed by Elizabeth Spencer and Charles W. Harrison is played and after a cut to black the credits appear on screen.

== Style ==
The movie consists of a single 10-minute planned sequence. For the first eight minutes only the leading actress is in focus seen at short distance in the foreground, while the background remains blurry. The entire movie does not contain any intelligible spoken word, except German: Los!, lit. 'Go!'. Throughout the film, and increasing in rate toward the end, an occasional dull thud is heard. Its source and origin cannot be recognized. A great deal of the story is told via the sound backdrop as most sound sources are out of frame, such as the scribbling of a pencil, typewriter strokes, the bark of a dog, or the wailing lady.

== Awards and selections ==
- Hungarian Society of Cinematographers: Best Short film 2007
- Hungarian Film Week: Best Short Film 2007
- 64th Venice International Film Festival: Official selection 2007

== Cast and crew ==
- Actors: Virág Marjai, Attila Menszátor-Héresz, Éva Kelényi, Kálmán Kovács, Endre Ferenczy
- Writer and Director: László Nemes
- Producer: András Muhi
- Cinematographer: Mátyás Erdély
- Sound Designer: Tamás Zányi
- Production designer: László Rajk
- Costume Designer: Edit Szűcs
- Production Manager: Andrea Taschler
- Co-producer: György Durst
- Associate producer: István Major
- Produced by: Inforg Stúdió, supported by Duna Workshop, the Hungarian Motion Pictures Foundation
