= Intimate Headshot =

- Directed by: Péter Szajki
- Starring: Gyözö Szabó; Tibor Gáspár
- Release date: 4 June 2009
- Running time: 1h 14min
- Country: Hungary
- Language: Hungarian

Intimate Headshot (Hungarian: Intim fejlövés) is a 2009 Hungarian comedy film directed by Péter Szajki.

== Cast ==
- Gyözö Szabó — Gábor
- Tibor Gáspár — Ákos
- Lehel Kovács — Tomi
- Zsolt Huszár — Balázs
- Eszter Nagy-Kálózy — Mari
- Kata Gáspár — Kati
