= Hi, Tereska =

2001 film directed by Robert Gliński

- Polish: Cześć Tereska
- Directed by: Robert Gliński
- Written by: Robert Gliński, Jacek Wyszomirski
- Starring: Aleksandra Gietner, Karolina Sobczak, Zbigniew Zamachowski
- Cinematography: Petro Aleksowski
- Edited by: Krzysztof Szpetmański
- Release date: 2001

Hi, Tereska is a 2001 film directed by Robert Gliński, written by Gliński and Jacek Wyszomirski.

== Cast ==
Source.

- Aleksandra Gietner as Tereska
- Karolina Sobczak as Renata
- Zbigniew Zamachowski as Edzio
- Małgorzata Rożniatowska as Tereska's mother
- Krzysztof Kiersznowski as Stasiek, Tereska's father
- Violetta Arlak as Jola, teacher
- Elżbieta Kijowska as director of school
- Sławomir Orzechowski as Miecio Kucharski
- Andrzej Szopa as leader of the choir
- Arkadiusz Nader as policeman at the police station
- Andrzej Chudy as policeman

== Awards ==
The film received Golden Lions at the Polish Film Festival, Special Jury Prize at the 36th Karlovy Vary Film Festival, 2002 Polish Film Award for Best Film and Golden Duck. Aleksandra Gietner and Karolina Sobczak were awarded Young Artist Award.
