= Raid on the Hotel Las Américas =

Bolivian police operation in 2009

The Raid on the Hotel Las Américas was an operation led by the Bolivian police on April 16, 2009, in the city of Santa Cruz de la Sierra. Three foreign nationals died in the operation, whom the police identified as terrorist mercenaries, while a further two people were arrested. According to the Bolivian police, the group had been planning to assassinate Bolivian President Evo Morales and Vice President Álvaro García Linera.

Eduardo Rózsa-Flores, Hungarian-Bolivian; Árpád Magyarosi, Hungarian-Romanian; and Michael Martin Dwyer, Irish; were killed during the raid. Mario Tadic, Croatian-Bolivian; and Előd Tóásó, Hungarian; were arrested.

== Political operation ==
On April 16, 2009, at 4.30 am, Bolivian security forces entered the Hotel Las Américas in the city of Santa Cruz. According to the police, the authorities arrived after receiving reports that five foreign nationals, occupying two rooms, were carrying arms. The police report stated that when agents attempted to enter the rooms, they were met with gunfire, initiating a shoot-out which went on for almost half an hour. That same day, the police reported having discovered an arsenal of explosives and firearms in the Santa Cruz fairground. According to some reports, the operation was carried out without any judge's warrant, which violates the Bolivian penal code.

The two arrested foreigners were brought to San Pedro prison, in La Paz.

== Accusations ==
President Evo Morales announced upon his arrival in Venezuela, on April 16, that the police had dismantled a right-wing conspiracy to assassinate the President and Vice President. According to Morales, this alleged commando group was responsible for an attack carried out on the house of Cardinal Julio Terrazas, a critic of Morales, two days earlier. The manager of the hotel has contradicted Morales, as he claims that the men were in their rooms when the attack on Terrazas occurred. Breaking with his custom, Morales did not mention the United States on this occasion: a country he has accused in the past of attempting to destabilise his government.

Vice President, Álvaro García Linera, also accused the leaders of the Santa Cruz separatist movement; but the prefect (now governor) of the Santa Cruz department, Rubén Costas, claimed that the incident was a "crude set-up" by the government, and noted that Morales had previously reported attacks against his person without offering any evidence. Costas also highlighted the absence of Santa Cruz prosecutors in the raid; and claimed that one of the objectives of the alleged set-up was to distract attention from the attack on Cardenal Terrazas.

The publication of photographs of cadavers in underwear or unclothed has raised suspicions around the facts of the shoot-out. The extended length of time it took to move the bodies, 16 hours, and the disconnection of CCTV cameras has strengthened these suspicions. Furthermore, it was determined that the doors to the rooms had been blown up before the shooting commenced. Finally, recordings from April 14, when the foreigners entered the hotel, had been deleted.

An Irish official declared shortly afterwards that in some of the photographs, Irish citizen Dwyer appeared with his hands bound, which he considered very unusual:

His hands were clearly tied in front. That is most unusual.

— Dick Roche, Irish Minister for European Affairs

The Hungarian Ambassador declared that the three foreigners may have been executed, alleging that the police did not give them time to react:

I'm going to give my personal opinion, (when) the police entered, these three (the deceased) may have wanted to react and made a move (...) but I do not believe that the police even allowed them to take one step. This was a meeting of two very scared groups.

— Mátyás Józsa, Hungarian ambassador to Argentina.

Evo Morales has invited the Hungarian, Irish and Croatian governments to undertake independent investigations in Bolivia, though he underlined that if these governments defend their deceased citizens, he may begin to suspect that they themselves were involved in the supposed conspiracy. For its part, the Bolivian opposition requested the participation of Interpol, whose help had already been offered; however, Morales rejected the request for international investigation, alleging that the opposition had no right to do so.

The Bolivian government also claimed to possess photographs which showed Dwyer with local officials; a week after the claims, however, the photos had still not been released. The opposition has underlined that this alleged evidence of political ties has still not been offered, and that this accusation only sought to damage them in the run up to the planned December elections. Dwyer's family have denied that he was a mercenary, claiming that he had not been interested in politics.

The Bolivian Minister of Government, Alfredo Rada, presented photographs of a group of people armed with airsoft guns (a game using guns which shoot plastic "bullets") and military uniform, whom he accused of being part of a terrorist group linked to Rózsa. Rada also believed he had identified Mauricio Iturri, an activist, in the photo. He subsequently acknowledged that the person in the photograph was not Iturri, but was instead an airsoft fan. The people in the photograph, members of the Santa Cruz Air Soft sports club, have defended themselves from Rada's accusations, explaining that they are only airsoft players. Despite demands from the opposition, Minister Rada refused to retract his error.

A video of Eduard Rózsa Flores, filmed in Hungary, was also presented, in which he claims he was contacted by a previously unknown organisation named the Consejo de Santa Cruz, asking that he return to Bolivia to organise the department's "defence". However, in that same video, Rózsa claims that he was not planning to overthrow Evo Morales, and that his intention was to organise "self-defence" to face up to "violent groups" of government supporters.

A friend of Rózsa, the infamous Carlos "el Chacal", denied that he was "a hitman for the extreme left". On the other hand, a Spanish journalist, Julio César Alonso, claimed that Rózsa was in fact a mercenary, and that he had been investigating him since a friend and colleague had allegedly been assassinated by Rózsa's group during the Croatian War of Independence, in which Rózsa fought as a volunteer in the Independence Army. Alonso claimed that videos existed in which Rózsa declared that he had been contracted to organise a civil war in Bolivia. Although he said that the evidence would be made public in September or October 2009, these had still not been released at the end of 2010.

In a leaked diplomatic cable from the US embassy in Bolivia, sent in May 2009, an unnamed whistle-blower assured North American authorities that the government of Evo Morales, under then Chief of Intelligence Jorge Santiesteban, had contacted Rózsa, with the aim of framing separatist groups and the principal regional leaders. Although, according to the cable, the US embassy in Bolivia had no means of verifying the claim, it was given credibility by the track record and political position of the informant, who had supposedly supplied photographs of the two surviving suspects, who presented with clear signs of having been tortured. In the cable, it is claimed that the guns had been planted by the police, who had even forgotten to deactivate the safety. The report concluded that Morales' government had intended to blame the United States for the incident, and underlined that the Bolivian attorney general had declared the existence of emails which linked Rósza with the CIA. The alleged US diplomatic cable ended as follows:

...many months will pass before all the truth about this case can be known, if it ever comes to be known.

The Bolivian Interior Minister, Sacha Llorenti, qualified this information as "gossip", underlining the fact that in the cable itself it was recognised that the "rumour" could not be verified, and announced that he would summon the US Chargé d'Affaires to La Paz to demand explanation.

== Investigations by the families ==
The respective families of Hungarian Árpád Magyarosi and Irish Michael Dwyer sought the repatriation of their bodies, and once under their control, requested that new autopsies were carried out.

In the case of Dwyer, an autopsy was performed by State Pathologist Professor Marie Cassidy and compared it with that which was carried out in Bolivia. Cassidy's report contradicted the Bolivian report, which claimed that Dwyer had died after being shot six times. According to Cassidy, Dwyer was shot only once, by a bullet which pierced his heart with a descending trajectory, which may indicate that he had been sitting on the bed at the time of his death. Furthermore, no evidence was found to suggest that Dwyer fired any gun.

In the case of Magyarosi, in addition to forensic analysis, the family requested that a Hungarian special forces police official carry out a ballistic examination. According to the results revealed by the family, Magyarosi was shot seven times, none of which were fatal, but died choking on his own blood half an hour after having been shot, contradicting the official version which indicated that he had bled to death. The report claimed that Magyarosi had been protecting his face, with his arms crossed, the first three times he was shot. The last four shots were fired as he lay on his back on the floor. As with Dwyer, no chemical residue was found to indicate that he had fired a gun.

In October 2009, the British ambassador to Bolivia, Nigel Baker, requested that the reports carried out in Europe be taken into account in the Bolivian investigation, claiming that the latter had "too many questionable points" and that at that moment "nothing" had been cleared up. However, it was soon clarified that Baker had not made these declarations on behalf of the United Kingdom or the European Union.

However, President Evo Morales reacted in declaring that although the European nations had the right to defend their citizens, they also had responsibilities in Bolivia:

We're not going to hide, we're not going to run away and we also want for them, if they are European Union ambassadors, to explain why they have sent these kinds of criminals who have a lot of experience in separatist efforts.

— Evo Morales, in response to statements made by the British ambassador, Nigel Baker.

Bolivian Vice President, Álvaro García Linera, also reacted, asserting that the Hungarian and Irish governments should apologise to Bolivia for their citizens' alleged crimes, and also dismissed the Hungarian report, explaining that these results did not line up with those obtained in the Bolivian autopsy. The attorney in charge of the case agreed with the Vice President, and declared that he would continue using the Bolivian results throughout the trial.

== Consequences ==
Days after the raid, the central government sent hundreds of soldiers to Santa Cruz, arguing that they were going to be carrying out preventative control duties. Furthermore, Morales issued a decree which allowed the seizure of suspected terrorists' personal property. According to his own government, the principal targets of this decree were Rubén Costas and Branko Marinkovic, opponents of Morales, who had been accused by the President of having supported Rósza financially. Costas and Marinkovic have denied these accusations, alleging that the objective of these claims is to neutralise them as political leaders. Costas, the Santa Cruz governor, has claimed that the aim of these accusations is:

...to terrorise and to scare off opponents (in the December presidential elections) in order to be able to run uncontested.

— Rubén Costas, regarding the accusations made against him.

After these events, the government agreed to a special parliamentary commission to investigate the alleged crimes of terrorism.

Several witnesses have been summoned to give evidence; one of the main witnesses is Ignacio Villa Vargas, the alleged mercenaries' driver, better known as "El Viejo" [The Old One]. According to Vargos, there existed a core group of financial backers supporting the alleged terrorist cell, which was formed of business owners and political activists in the Santa Cruz department.

On June 13, the Bolivian public prosecutor ordered the capture of seven people who had not attended to give evidence in the case. Two of those named worked in the principal telecommunications company of the Santa Cruz region, which was at risk of being nationalised at the time. The main evidence against these people were "chat" conversations obtained from the computer taken during the raid on the Hotel Las Américas, and photographs of the alleged mercenaries counting money. Several of the suspects implicated subsequently fled Bolivia, but the President declared that he was prepared to bring them to military justice, accusing them of being separatists.

On December 17, 2010, the Bolivian public prosecutor presented a formal complaint against 39 people for their alleged involvement in the case. Pablo Costas Aguilera, brother of the opposition governor Rubén Costas, is the principal suspect implicated by the prosecutor in charge.
