= Christian Harting =

German actor (born 1976)

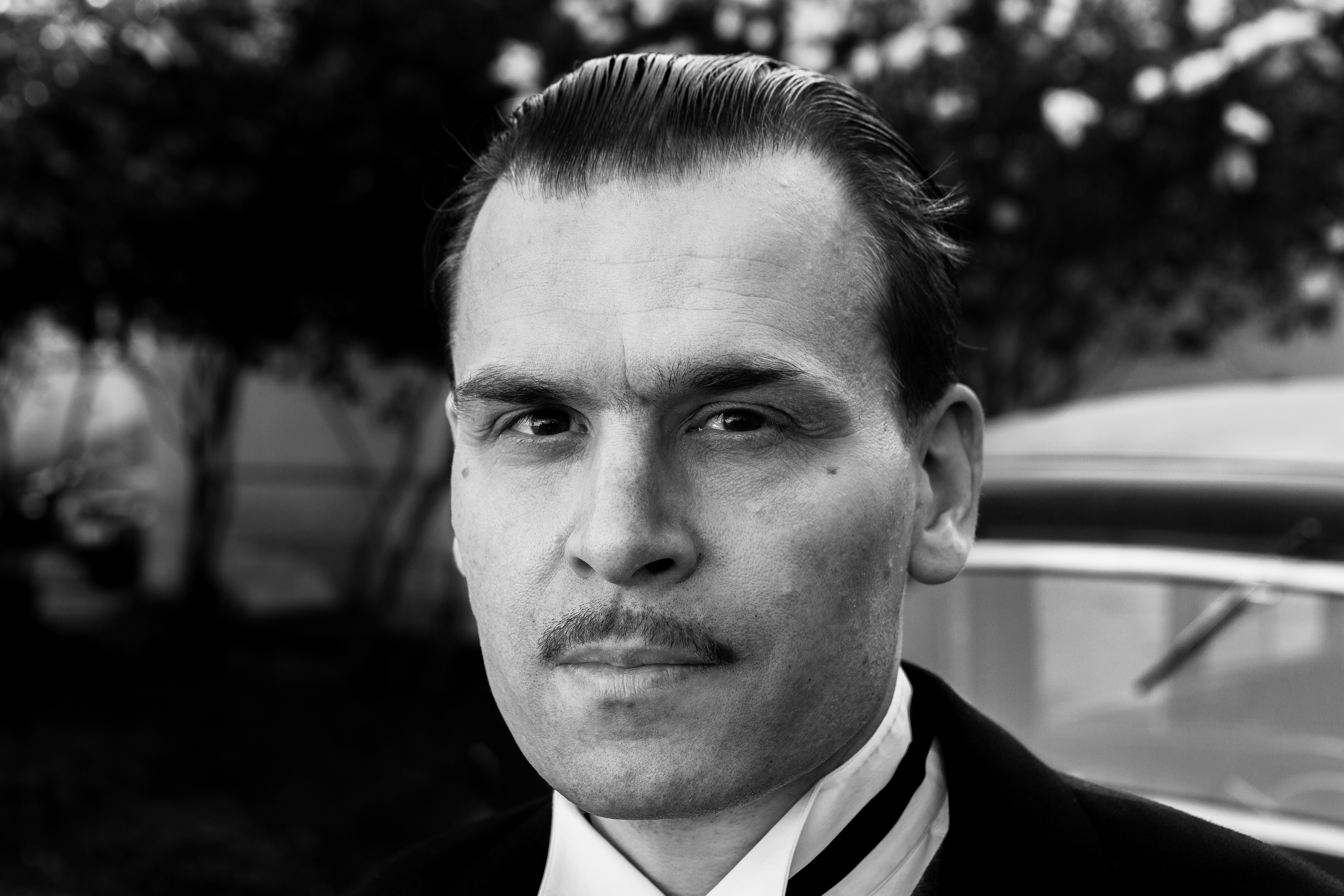
- Christian Harting by Peter Gesierich, Prague-Barrandov 2015.
- Born: 1976 (age 49–50); East Berlin, East Germany
- Occupation: Actor
- Years active: 2010–present
- Known for: Son of Saul, Sunset

Christian Harting (born 1976 in East Berlin, GDR) is a German actor and physician.

== Life and career ==
Christian Harting studied medical science at FU Berlin. After graduation he took acting lessons with Michael Peter and Christine Kostropetsch and since 2010 he has appeared in feature films and TV series in supporting roles as well as leading roles in numerous short films. He is best known for his roles in the two feature films of Hungarian director László Nemes, SS-officer Busch in Son of Saul and Viennese aristocrat Otto von König in Sunset. Son of Saul won the Grand Prix as well as the FIPRESCI Prize at the Cannes Film Festival 2015 and was awarded with a Golden Globe and an Academy Award for Best foreign language film in 2016. Sunset won the FIPRESCI Prize at the Venice Film Festival 2018. In the autumn of 2025, Harting worked with the director for the third time, playing Harry Steingritt, SD-officer and deputy of Klaus Barbie, in Moulin, László Nemes' first French-language film. The film had its world premiere at the main competition of the 2026 Cannes Film Festival on 17 May and is expected to be released in France by Studio TF1 on 28 October 2026.

== Filmography ==
- 2010: Dr. Ketel (Feature film directed by Linus de Paoli)
- 2012: The Lost (Feature film directed by Reynold Reynolds)
- 2012: Shores of Hope (Feature film directed by Toke C. Hebbeln)
- 2013: WESPEN – Les guêpes (Short film directed by Hannibal Tourette)
- 2013: About:Kate (Arte-TV-series directed by Janna Maria Nandzik)
- 2014: Fiddlesticks (Feature film directed by Veit Helmer)
- 2015: Son of Saul (Feature film directed by László Nemes)
- 2016: Courage (Short film directed by Jean-Luc Julien)
- 2017: White City (Short film directed by Dani Gal)
- 2018: Datsche (Feature film directed by Lara Hewitt)
- 2018: Sunset (Feature film directed by László Nemes)
- 2021: A Father's Job (Short film directed by Frank Christian Wagner)
- 2023: Black Box (Feature film directed by Aslı Özge)
- 2023: Bonn – Alte Freunde, neue Feinde (TV-series directed by Claudia Garde)
- 2023: Nuremberg (Feature film directed by Nikolai Lebedev)
- 2024: After the Evil (Documentary directed by Tamara Erde)
- 2026: Moulin (Feature film directed by László Nemes)

== Awards ==
In 2017 Harting was nominated as Best Lead Actor in a Foreign Language Film at International Filmmaker Festival of World Cinema BERLIN for the short film Courage. For his title role in the short film A Father's Job he was winning awards as Best Actor in 2021 at the Actor's Awards Los Angeles and the Indie Shorts Awards Cannes.
