= All That Really Matters =

1992 Polish film

- Directed by: Robert Gliński
- Written by: Dzamila Ankiewicz; Ola Watowa
- Starring: Ewa Skibińska
- Release date: 18 September 1992
- Running time: 98 minutes
- Country: Poland
- Language: Polish

All That Really Matters (Polish: Wszystko, co najważniejsze) is a 1992 Polish drama film directed by Robert Gliński. The film was selected as the Polish entry for the Best Foreign Language Film at the 65th Academy Awards, but was not accepted as a nominee.

== Cast ==
- Ewa Skibińska as Paulina "Ola" Wat
- Krzysztof Globisz as Aleksander Wat
- Adam Siemion as Andrzej Wat
- Grazyna Barszczewska as Barbara Zielinska
- Bogusław Linda as Tadeusz Bogucki
- Viktor Chebotaryov as Ivan
- Natalya Kolyakanova as Vera
- Krzysztof Stroiński as Adam Chrostowski

== See also ==
- List of submissions to the 65th Academy Awards for Best Foreign Language Film
- List of Polish submissions for the Academy Award for Best Foreign Language Film
