= The District! =

Nyócker!
- Directed by: Áron Gauder
- Written by: Máriusz Bari; Viktor Nagy; Erik Novák; László Jakab Orsós
- Produced by: Erik Novák
- Music by: Erik Novák
- Release date: 9 December 2004
- Running time: 87 minutes
- Country: Hungary
- Language: Hungarian
- Budget: 525,000 USD

The District! (Hungarian: Nyócker!) is a 2004 Hungarian adult animated comedy film directed by Áron Gauder. Its original title is a shortened colloquial form of nyolcadik kerület, the eighth district of Budapest, also known as Józsefváros, including an infamous neighbourhood where the film takes place.

It has been distributed in the Czech Republic, Slovakia, United Kingdom, France, the Benelux countries, Romania, Poland, Portugal and Taiwan, and it is going to be shown in the United States.

It was also shown at film festivals in Helsinki, Toronto, Copenhagen, Zagreb, Karlovy Vary and the below venues and it will be shown in Warsaw, Vancouver and São Paulo.

== Plot ==
The film displays the Hungarian, Roma, Chinese and Arab dwellers and their alliances and conflicts in a humorous way, embedded into a fictive story of a few schoolchildren's oil-making time-travel and a Romeo and Juliet-type love of a Roma guy towards a white girl.

== Cast and crew ==
Directed by
Áron Gauder

Screenplay
Máriusz Bari
Viktor Nagy
Erik Novák
László Jakab Orsós

Produced by
Erik Novák

Original Music by
Erik Novák

Cast

voice actor	face actor	character	notes
L.L. Junior	Krisztián Rostás	Ricsi Lakatos	Main character, Roma kid
László Szacsvay	József Németh	Guszti Lakatos	Ricsi's grandfather
Károly Gesztesi	László Jakab Orsós	Lóránt "Lóri" Lakatos	Pub owner, Ricsi's father
Győző Szabó		Károly "Karesz" Csorba	Nightclub owner, Lóri's rival
Gábor Csőre	Kristóf Novák	Simon "Simi" Csorba	Karesz's son, Ricsi's rival
Gábor Csőre	?	Chen	Chinese kid
Andrea Roatis	Kriszti Szénási	Julika Csorba	Karesz's daughter, Ricsi's love interest
Dorka Gryllus	Fanny Volcsánszky	Mari Lakatos	Ricsi's sister, Simon's love interest
Judit Jónás		Rózi Lakatos	Gypsy fortune teller, Guszti's wife and head of the family
István Betz	Erno Báder	Sandokan Kolompár	Ricsi's fearless friend
András Faragó	István Nagy	Kolompár	Sandokan's father
Zoltán Rajkai	Gyula Horváth	Abdul	Arab kid
Csaba Krisztián Csík	András Molnár	Omar	Abdul's father
Barnabás Szabó Sipos	Zsolt Lengyel	Dr. Zsírvágó	Jewish gynecologist and plastic surgeon. The name literally means "fat-cutting doctor"
Balázs Simonyi	Máriusz Bari	Móricka	Geeky, genius kid, Zsírvágó's son
Sándor Badár		Badár	Policeman
János Horváth	János Horváth	Vizy	Policeman
Csaba Pindroch		Béluska "Bélus"	Vizy's son
Anna Orosz	Éva Járvás	Ági néni	Teacher
Andrea Fullajtár	Zsuzsa Kocsis	Irina	
Nóra Parti	Renáta Kósa	Anett	
Éva Dögei	Veronika Gróf	Isaura	
Mike Kelly	Simon József	Steve	CIA agent

== Awards ==
Date	Award	Festival	Location	Link	obs
2004–12	Best Visual Expression	Magyar Filmszemle	Hungary		
2005-06-11	Cristal for best feature	Annecy International Animated Film Festival	Annecy, France		
2005-08-19	Grand Prize	Seoul International Cartoon and Animation Festival	Seoul, South Korea		
2005-09-25	Mercury Filmworks Grand Prize For Animated Feature	Ottawa International Animation Festival	Ottawa, Ontario, Canada		
2005-09-28	Best Animated Feature	KROK International Animated Films Festival	Russia		
2005-10-13	Best Animated Film	Festival de Cine de Sitges	Sitges, Spain		
2005	Cross of Merit of the Republic of Hungary		Hungary		
2005	Best Hungarian Feature; Kecskemét City Award	KAFF (Kecskemét Animation Film Festival)	Kecskemét, Hungary		
2005	Golden Zagreb award	Animafest Zagreb	Zagreb, Croatia		
2006	Best Feature	Anima	Spain		
2006	Best Feature	CUFF 2006 (Calgary Underground Film Festival)	Zagreb, Canada		
2006	Best feature; Audience Award	Anima (film festival)	Belgium		
2007	Lisbon City Prize	Monstra Festival	Lisbon, Portugal		

Notes:

- ^Note a: The panel was shocked at the technological modernity of the film and at learning that it was only made from 105 million HUF (525,000 USD).
- ^Note b: "For its visual innovation, energetic style, and fearless satire of contemporary culture and politics"
- ^Note c: On the board Princess of Dneper – out of 130 films from 36 countries of the world.
- ^Note d: Awarded to Director Aron Gauder

== Festivals ==
The film has been presented in several film festivals across the world, including:

- 7 July 2005: Karlovy Vary Film Festival (Karlovy Vary, Czech Republic)
- 24 August 2005: Copenhagen International Film Festival (Denmark)
- 13 September 2005: Toronto International Film Festival (Canada)
- 15–25 September 2005: Helsinki Film Festival
- September/October 2005: Melbourne International Film Festival 2005
- 27 October 2005: Karlovy Vary International Film Festival
- 18 November 2005: Waterloo Festival for Animated Cinema (Canada)
- 18 November 2005: Oslo International Film Festival (Norway)
- 1 February 2006: Gothenburg Film Festival (Gothenburg, Sweden)
- 16 February 2006: !f Istanbul Independent Film Festival (Istanbul, Turkey)
- 10 March 2006: Mar del Plata Film Festival (Mar del Plata, Argentina)
- 7 April 2006: Philadelphia International Film Festival (Philadelphia, USA)
- 3 June 2006: Transilvania International Film Festival (Cluj-Napoca, Romania)
- 12 April 2007: Wisconsin Film Festival (Wisconsin, USA)
- 6 December 2007: Festafife – Festival International de Marionetas e Cinema de Animação (Afife, Portugal)
- 5 January 2008: Project Twenty1 Film-A-Thon (Philadelphia, USA)
