= Chico (film) =

2002 film by Ibolya Fekete

- Directed by: Ibolya Fekete
- Written by: Ibolya Fekete
- Produced by: Gábor Dettre
- Starring: Eduardo Rózsa Flores
- Cinematography: Mátyás Erdély; Antonio Farías; Nyika Jancsó
- Edited by: Anna Kornis
- Production companies: Arte; Hunnia Filmstúdió; Maxima Film Compagnia Cinematografica; Roos Film; Zweites Deutsches Fernsehen (ZDF)
- Distributed by: Hunnia Filmstúdió (all media); Maxima Film (all media); ZDF Enterprises (all media)
- Release date: 17 January 2002 (Hungary)
- Running time: 112 minutes
- Countries: Germany; Croatia; Hungary; Chile
- Languages: Spanish; Hungarian; Croatian; English

Chico is a 2001 International co-production film about the life of Eduardo Rózsa Flores, directed by Hungarian director Ibolya Fekete.

== Plot ==
The protagonist is a man who was born in Bolivia to a Hungarian immigrant. His family fled to Chile after a coup in Bolivia, and remained in Chile until the 1973 coup, after which they fled to Hungary. After coming of age in Hungary, Chico witnesses the Yugoslav wars in the 1990s.

== Production ==
The Croatian Ministry of Defence subsidized the production of the film. Several Croatian actors had a part in film.

== Reception ==
Sándor Turcsányi of Magyar Narancs wrote, "To sum it up: Chico, although a failure, is interesting and recommended viewing. Probably the saddest thing about it is that it is without any moral lessons. It is a failure of the film-making method, but the method itself cannot be blamed. The reason is rather that the director's vision is unfocused and too ambitious." Felicitas Becker of Kinoeye wrote, ″The director, Ibolya Fekete, has claimed that the film is a call to kiss goodbye to ideologies of all kind, and especially to stop killing or dying for them. Bewilderingly, she nevertheless seemed pleased that a majority of the audience members at a post-screening talk at the Chicago film festival had understood it to take the Croats' struggle against the Serbs between 1992 and 1993 as a just war. Even more puzzling, she was happy to be told by a Croat ex-combatant in the audience that she had depicted the war "exactly as it was." This may be so, but one would expect the director to acknowledge that in a situation in which perspectives are as polarized as this war 'telling it as it was' must be subjective and have nothing to do with objectivity. Failing to do so, the film becomes disingenuous as well as naïve.″

Tibor Hirsch of Filmvilág wrote, ″Let's remember: it's not the first knight-errant tale in Hungarian film history. We had a Major Fiala and a Gábor Bódy, who quoted Pilinszky at the beginning of his film Amerikai anzix : "you have to go on every road..." With a more tired, more cynical approach: you have to get involved in everything where partial truth shines and where you can find a friend, and then you can lose it. Knighthood as an Eastern European and South American way of life. The story of Ibolya Fekete is not Gábor Bódy's. Neither is Chico's. If her film does not show the struggle of ideas and peoples in documentary images, but the loss of friends in the fiction lane, then it shows a face. A man who lived and tells stories. His gaze is straight, he crunches the r's in Spanish. A survivor tells a story to his friend who is still alive. The person they are talking to is already tired. He who speaks is tireless.″

== Awards and nominations ==
At the 36th Karlovy Vary International Film Festival, the film was nominated for the Crystal Globe and Ibolya Fekete won the Best Director Award for it.
