= Moulin (2026 film) =

French war biopic by László Nemes

- French promotional poster
- Directed by: László Nemes
- Written by: Olivier Demangel
- Produced by: Alain Goldman
- Starring: Gilles Lellouche; Lars Eidinger; Louise Bourgoin; Félix Lefebvre; Marcin Czarnik; Christian Harting
- Cinematography: Mátyás Erdély
- Edited by: Péter Politzer
- Music by: Laetitia Pansanel
- Production companies: Pitchipoï Productions; Montmartre Films; Studio TF1
- Distributed by: Studio TF1
- Release dates: 17 May 2026 (Cannes); 28 October 2026 (France)
- Running time: 130 minutes
- Country: France
- Languages: French; German

Moulin is a 2026 French historical drama war biopic directed by László Nemes, in his French language debut, and written by Olivier Demangel. It follows Jean Moulin (Gilles Lellouche), a French Resistance member during the Nazi occupation of France.

The film had its world premiere in the main competition of the 2026 Cannes Film Festival on 17 May, where it competed for the Palme d'Or. It received generally positive reviews. It's scheduled to be theatrically released in France by Studio TF1 on 28 October.

== Premise ==
The biographical film follows Jean Moulin, who is dropped into Nazi-occupied France to help bring the Resistance groups together for Charles de Gaulle. Even though he tries to stay hidden, he is eventually betrayed and handed over to the Gestapo in Lyon, led by the brutal Klaus Barbie. Moulin is tortured again and again but never gives in. His fortitude inspires the Resistance and helps spark a renewed fight for freedom in France.

== Cast ==
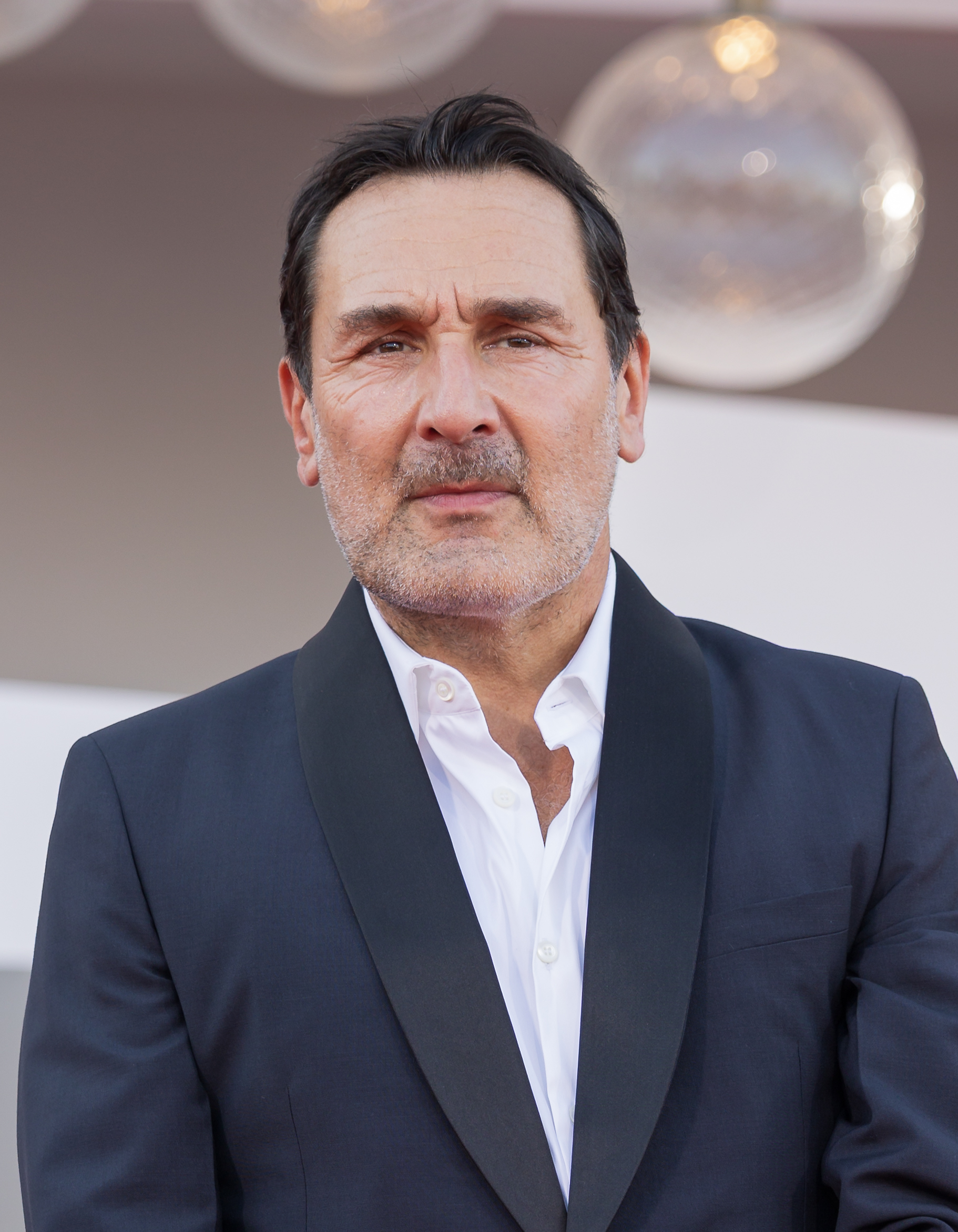
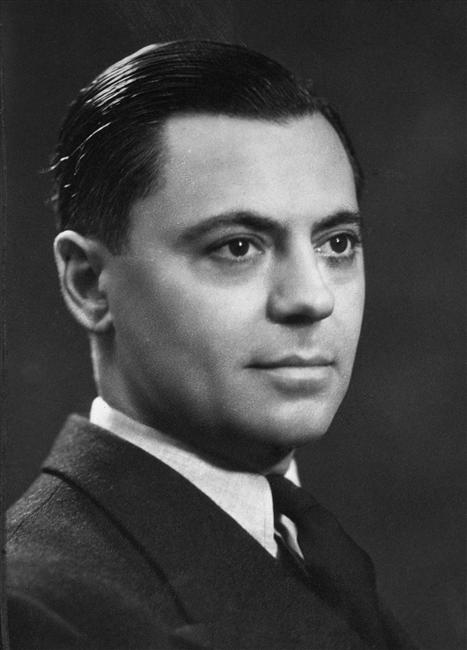
Gilles Lellouche (left) plays Jean Moulin (right).
- Gilles Lellouche as Jean Moulin
- Lars Eidinger as Klaus Barbie
- Louise Bourgoin as Countess De Forez
- Félix Lefebvre as Martin
- Marcin Czarnik as Raymond Aubrac
- Max Warburton as Alain
- Pierre Nisse as Moog
- Christian Harting as Steingritt
- Hortense Quentin de Gromard as Colette
- Théo Costa-Marini as Aubry / Thomas
- Izabella Caussanel as Mathilde
- Cser Kinga as Marguerite
- Mathias Vigouroux as the male nurse of Montluc

== Production ==
The film is produced by Alain Goldman for Pitchipoï Productions and Montmartre Films, in co-production with TF1 Films Productions. In February 2025, Goldman announced in an interview with Écran Total that he would produce a biographical film about Jean Moulin directed by Hungarian filmmaker László Nemes. In May 2025, the project was presented at the Marché du Film. Written by Olivier Demangel, it is Nemes' first French-language film.

Principal photography commenced in France on 15 September 2025. It marked Nemes' fourth feature film collaboration with Hungarian cinematographer Mátyás Erdély, who shot it in 35 mm film.

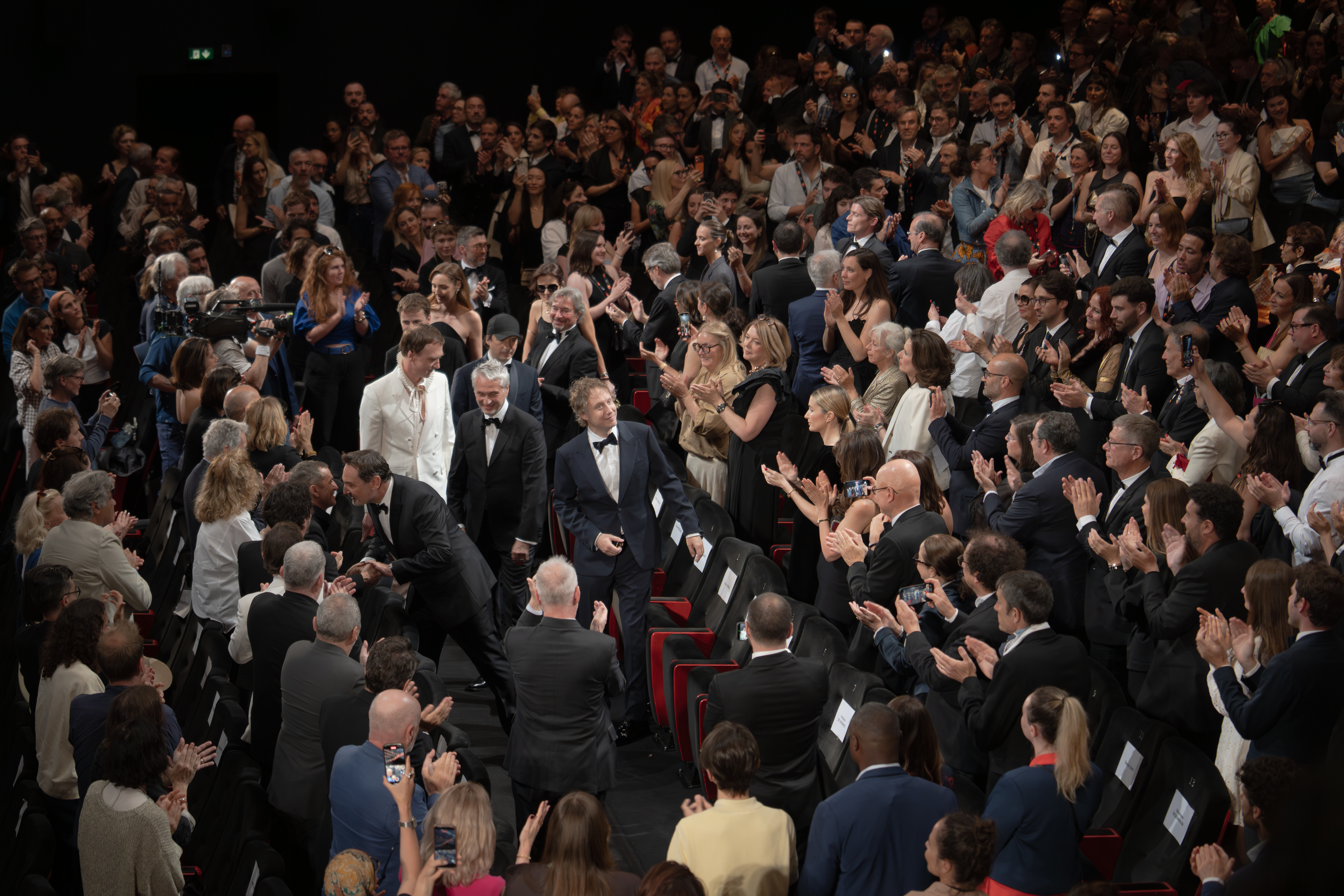
Nemes during the film's world premiere at the 2026 Cannes Film Festival

== Release ==
The film had its world premiere at the main competition of the 2026 Cannes Film Festival on 17 May, where it competed for the Palme d'Or. It will be released in France by Studio TF1 on 28 October 2026, and was pre-purchased for other territories by Disney+ and HBO Max.

== Reception ==
On the review aggregator website Rotten Tomatoes, 64% of 22 critics' reviews are positive, with an average rating of 6.7/10. Metacritic, which uses a weighted average, assigned the film a score of 67 out of 100, based on 11 critics, indicating "generally favorable" reviews.
