= After the Day Before =

2004 film directed by Attila Janisch

- Directed by: Attila Janisch
- Starring: Tibor Gáspár; Borbála Derzsi
- Release date: 16 February 2004
- Running time: 120 minutes
- Country: Hungary
- Language: Hungarian

After the Day Before (Hungarian: Másnap) is a 2004 Hungarian crime film directed by Attila Janisch.
