= Urs Rechn =

German actor (b. 1978

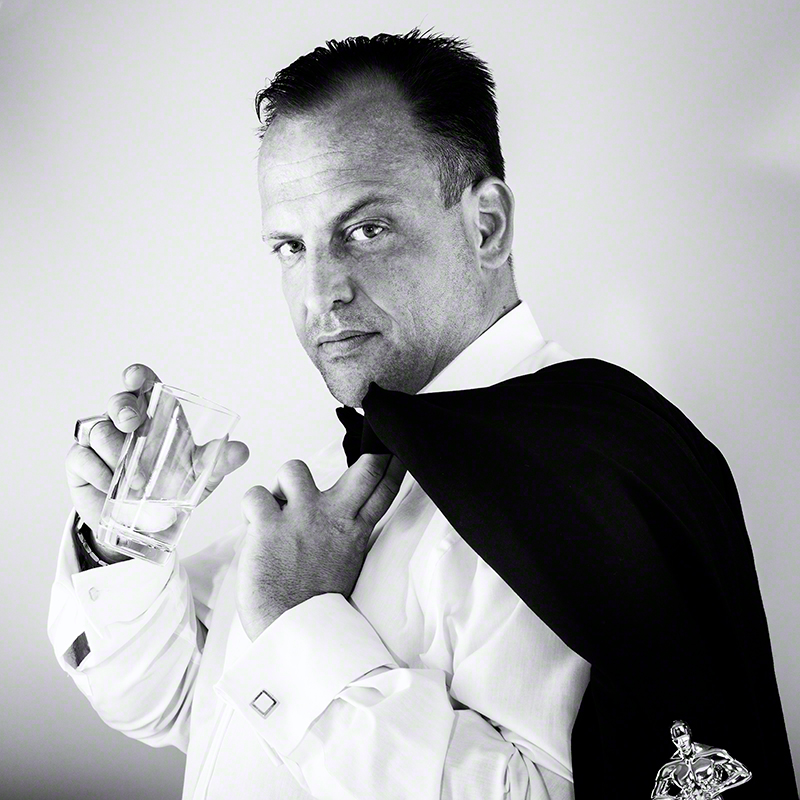
- Urs Rechn, February 2015
- Born: 18 January 1978 (age 48); Halle an der Saale, East Germany
- Occupation: Actor
- Years active: 1999-present
- Known for: Roles in Son of Saul and Eight Miles High

Urs Rechn (born 18 January 1978) is a German actor, most known for his appearance in the 2015 Cannes Grand Prix-winning Holocaust drama Son of Saul.

== Biography ==
Urs Günther Rechn was born on 18 January 1978, in Halle an der Saale, then German Democratic Republic, now Saxony-Anhalt, Germany, to Günther Rechn (a painter and graphic artist from East Germany) and his wife Beate Rechn, the second of their three children.

In 1997 he was drafted into the German paratrooper corps, and later was in the German special forces. In the meantime, he appeared in several TV episodes under to an agreement with his colonel. After leaving the military in 2002, Rechn attended the University of Music and Theater Felix Mendelssohn Bartholdy in Leipzig, and graduated in 2004.

He played the Jewish Oberkapo Biedermann in the film Son of Saul by Hungarian director László Nemes which won the Grand Prix at the 2015 Cannes Film Festival as well as several further international awards. In June 2015, Hungary announced its submission of Son of Saul as their candidate for the foreign language film Oscar at the 2016 Academy Awards. On February 28, Son of Saul won the Oscar.

== Filmography ==
=== TV (selection) ===
- 1999: Die Strandclique – Dir.: Wolfgang Münstermann
- 2000: Powderpark – Dir.: Christian Stier
- 2001: Klinikum Berlin Mitte – Dir.: Ullrich Zrenner
- 2002: Our Charly – Dir.: Franz Josef Gottlieb
- 2003: Die Kommissarin (Lady Cop) – Dir.: Rolf Liccini
- 2007: GSG 9 (Special Unit) – Dir.: Florian Kern
- 2003: Der Ermittler: Stadt, Land, Mord, ZDF
- 2004: Hunger for Life, TV movie
- 2005: Tatort – Freischwimmer, ARD (MDR)
- 2015: Polizeiruf 110 – Im Schatten, ARD (MDR)
- 2016: X Company, "Black Flag", CBC Television, Dir.: Kelly Makin
- 2018: Dogs of Berlin – Netflix, Dir.: Christian Alvart

=== Cinema (selection) ===
- 2003: Broad Hit, Dir.: Gennadi Poloka, RUS
- 2004: Juraan, Dir.: Andrej Kudinenko, RUS
- 2006: Eight Miles High, Dir.: Achim Bornhak, GER
- 2013: Run Boy Run, Dir.: Pepe Danquart, GER
- 2014: The King's Surrender, Dir.: Philipp Leinemann, GER
- 2015: Son of Saul, Dir.: László Nemes, HUN
- 2019: Inside Man: Most Wanted, Dir.: Michael J. Bassett, USA
- 2020: Waiting for Anya, Dir.: Ben Cookson, UK, BEL
- 2024: Hounds of War

=== Roles on stage since 2003 (selection) ===
Staatsschauspiel Dresden, Landestheater Tübingen, Schauspiel Chemnitz Chemnitz Opera

- Man Equals Man (Galy Gay) Bertolt Brecht, Dir.: Küf Kaufmann
- The Broken Jug (Adam) Heinrich von Kleist, Dir.: Rudolf Donath
- The Seagull (Treblev) Anton Tchechov, Dir.: Tom Quaas
- The Merchant of Venice (Antonio) William Shakespeare, Dir: Holk Freitag
- Caligula (Caligula) Albert Camus, Dir: Rudolf Donath
- Draussen vor der Tür (Beckmann) Wolfgang Borchert, Dir: Mario Grünewald
- Downfall of the Egotist Johann Fatzer (Koch) Bertolt Brecht/Heiner Müller, Dir.: Tim Grobe
- Cat on a Hot Tin Roof (Brick) Tennessee Williams, Dir.. Holk Freitag
- Julius Caesar (Marcus Antonius) William Shakespeare, Dir.: Rainer Flath
- Mamma Medea (Jason) Tom Lanoye, Dir.: Simone Sterr
- The Good Person of Szechwan (Yang Ssun) Bertolt Brecht, Dir.: Ralf Siebelt
- A Report to an Academy (Red Peter) Franz Kafka, Dir.: Urs Rechn
- The Prisoner's Dilemma, David Edgar, Dir.: Clemens Bechtel
- Iphigenie auf Tauris (Orest) Johann Wolfgang von Goethe, Dir.: Alexander Nerlich
- Innocence (Elisio) von Dea Loher, Dir: Tomas Krupa
- A Streetcar Named Desire (Stanley Kowalski), Tennessee Williams, Dir.: Enrico Lübbe
- A Report to an Academy (Red Peter) Franz Kafka, Dir.: Mario Grünewald, Urs Rechn
- The Snow Queen (Märchenerzähler / Rabe / Räuber), Hans Christian Andersen/Jewgenij Schwarz
- Amphitryon (Amphitryon), Heinrich von Kleist, Dir.: Kay Neumann
- The Threepenny Opera (Peachum), Bertolt Brecht, Dir.: Philip Tiedemann
