= Levente Molnár =

Hungarian-Romanian actor

- Born: 10 March 1976 (age 49)
- Occupation: Actor
- Known for: Son of Saul
- Awards: Best Supporting Actor Award 2020 - Hungarian Film Critics Association

Levente Molnár (born 10 March 1976), is a Hungarian-Romanian actor, most notable for playing Abraham in the Academy Award-winning film, Son of Saul. He is a Member of the European Film Academy (EFA).

In 1997, he acted at the Gheorgheni-based Figura Studio, and, from 1998 and 2002, was part of the Faculty of arts at the Babeș-Bolyai University, and studied acting at the Theatre Arts Department, in the class of András Hatházi.

After graduating, Molnár became a member of the Hungarian Theatre of Cluj and started teaching acting at the Babeș-Bolyai University In addition to roles in theatre, he took part, in 2002 and 2003, movement theatre performances based on choreography by Melinda Jakab at the Gheorghe Dima Music Academy. He regularly participates in various international dance, movement and theatre arts workshops.

He has had several film roles, including Grey Nobodies by István Kovács, Tabula Rasa by Sándor Csoma, Genezis by Árpád Bogdán, Tall Tales by Attila Szász, Captives by Kristóf Deák, Morgen by Marian Crisan and in the László Nemes-directed multiple award-winning film Son of Saul and Sunset.

Molnár speaks Hungarian and Romanian fluently, English at an advanced level, and German at an intermediate level.

== Filmography ==
=== Theature ===
- Nem bírtok játszani rajtam (Anton Pavlovics Csehov: Hattyúdal és Lakodalom című művei nyomán) – Zsigalov (college role)
- Rainer Werner Fassbinder: A digó – Erich (college role)
- Christopher Hampton: Veszedelmes viszonyok – Danceny (college role)
- Hugo von Hofmannsthal: Jedermann – Akárki (college role)
- Szomory Dezső: Május – Öngyilkos (college role)
- Sütő András: Káin és Ábel – Ádám, 2000
- Éjszakák az ezeregyből – Kászib fia, 2002
- Egressy Zoltán: Kék, kék, kék – Fil, 2002
- S. Anski nyomán: Fehér tűz, fekete tűz – Michael, Aszriel segédje, illetve Második batlán, 2001
- Ion Luca Caragiale: Farsang – Iordache, Girimea segédje, 2002
- Carlo Goldoni: A komédiaszínház – Színházi szolga, akik nem jutnak szóhoz, 2002
- William Shakespeare: Téli rege – XXX, 2003
- Benjamin Britten – András Visky – György Selmeczi: A vasárnapi iskola avagy Noé bárkája – Ábel, illetve Ábel, 2003
- Christopher Marlowe: Doktor Faustus tragikus históriája – Bíboros, 2003
- Pantagruel sógornője (Hommage Rabelais) – Szereplő, 2003
- Luigi Pirandello: Öltöztessük fel a mezteleneket – Franco Laspiga, volt sorhajóhadnagy, 2004
- Henrik Ibsen: A vadkacsa – Kedélyes vendég, 2004
- Paul Portner: Hajmeresztő – Tony Whitcomb, a Hajmeresztô szalon tulajdonosa, 2004
- Barabás Olga: Krimi – Tommy Marston, 2004
- Carlo Goldoni: Velencei terecske – Zorzetto, a fia, 2005
- Georg Büchner: Woyzeck – Katona, 2005
- Feketeszemű rózsák – Vőfély, 2005
- Visky András: Tanítványok – Máté, 2005
- Bertolt Brecht: Kispolgári nász – A barát, 2006
- Visky András: Hosszú péntek – Pörge, 2006
- Énekek éneke – Az éj várfalainak őre, 2007
- Giacomo Puccini: Gianni Schicchi – Egy árny, 2007
- Thomas Bernhard: A vadásztársaság – Első miniszter, 2008
- Henrik Ibsen: Peer Gynt – Begriffendelt professzor, Pincér, Manó illetve Falubeli, 2008
- Danilo Kiš: Borisz Davidovics síremléke – Fegyukin vizsgálóbíró, 2008
- Anton Pavlovics Csehov: Három nővér – Fedotyik, Alexej Petrovics hadnagy, 2008
- William Shakespeare: III. Richárd – Sir Richárd Ratcliff, 2008
- Georg Büchner: Danton halála – Hermann, a Forradalmi Törvényszék elnöke, 2009
- Peca Ştefan – Andreea Vălean – Radu Apostol – Gianina Cărbunariu: Verespatak – Szereplő, 2010
- Marin Držic: Dundo Maroje – Ribillió Rómában – Popiva, Maro szolgája, 2011
- Albert Camus: Caligula – Helicon, 2011
- Felméri Cecília – Róbert Lakatos: Drakulatúra – Szereplő, 2011
- Friedrich Dürrenmatt: A fizikusok – Ernst Heinrich Ernesti, más néven Einstein, páciens, 2012
- Móricz Zsigmond: Nem élhetek muzsikaszó nélkül – Peták, mindenes, 2013
- Bohumil Hrabal: Őfelsége pincére voltam – Tichota úr, kerekesszékes hoteltulajdonos, Gestapo, ill. Nagykövet, 2013
- Roger Vitrac: Viktor, avagy a gyermekuralom – Mária, szobalány, A doktor, ill. A néma hölgy, 2013
- Stephen Sondheim: Sweeney Todd – Jonas Fogg, 2014
- Ignác Nagy – Parti Nagy Lajos: Tisztújítás – Farkasfalvy, alispán, 2014
- Friedrich Dürrenmatt: Az öreg hölgy látogatása – Festő, 2015
