= Győző Szabó =

Hungarian actor

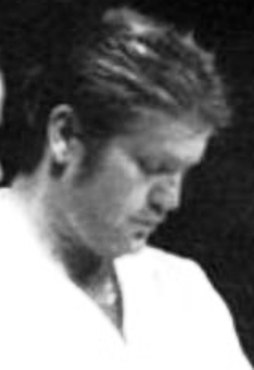
- Szabó in 2000.
- Born: 7 July 1970 (age 55); Nyírbátor, Hungary
- Occupation: Actor
- Years active: 1994-present

Győző Szabó (born 7 July 1970) is a Hungarian actor. He appeared in more than sixty films since 1994.

== Selected filmography ==
Year	Title	Role	Notes
2002	A Kind of America		
2003	Kontroll	Shadow	
2004	The District!	Karesz	voice only
2009	Intimate Headshot	Gabor	
2015	Liza, the Fox-Fairy	Mr. B./Jonny	
