= Mom and Other Loonies in the Family =

2015 Hungarian-German-Bulgarian drama film

- Film poster
- Hungarian: Anyám és más futóbolondok a családból
- Directed by: Ibolya Fekete
- Written by: Ibolya Fekete
- Produced by: Gábor Garami
- Starring: Eszter Ónodi; Tibor Gáspár; György Barkó; Juli Básti; Danuta Szaflarska
- Cinematography: Francisco Gózon
- Edited by: Károly Szalay
- Music by: János Novák
- Production companies: NiKo Film; Cinema Film; KaBoAl Pictures; Hungarian Film Fund
- Distributed by: Vertigo Média
- Release date: 5 November 2015 (Hungary)
- Running time: 110 minutes
- Countries: Hungary; Bulgaria; Germany
- Language: Hungarian
- Box office: $46,507

Mom and Other Loonies in the Family (Hungarian: Anyám és más futóbolondok a családból) is a 2015 Hungarian-German-Bulgarian drama film directed by Ibolya Fekete that tells the story of four generations of Hungarian women spanning the twentieth century.

== Cast ==
- Eszter Ónodi as Berta Gardó (mother
- Tibor Gáspár as Lajos Barkó (father)
- György Barkó as Sándor Mille (great-grandfather)
- Juli Básti as young Berta / Rozál Mille
- Danuta Szaflarska as Berta, aged 92

== Release ==
The film was released on 5 November 2015 in Hungary. The DVD release, held on 25 May 2016, was accompanied by a signing attended by director Ibolya Fekete and lead Eszter Ónodi.
