= Best Director Award (Karlovy Vary IFF) =

Best director award at the Czech film festival

- Awarded for: Award for the best director for films in the Crystal Globe Competition
- Country: Czech Republic
- Presented by: Karlovy Vary International Film Festival
- First award: 1990
- Final award: 2026
- Currently held by: Mads Menge
- Website: www.kviff.com/en/about-the-festival/awards

The Best Director Award is one of main awards of the Feature Film Competition at the Karlovy Vary International Film Festival. Since 1990, it is conferred on the best director.

== Best Director Award winners ==
Year	Director	Film	Original Title	Nationality of Director
2026	Mads Mengel	The Guest	Gæsten	Denmark
2025	Nathan Ambrosioni	Out of Love	Les enfants vont bien	France
2019	Tim Mielants	Patrick	De Patrick	Belgian
2018	Olmo Omerzu	Winter Flies	Všechno bude	Slovenian
2017	Peter Bebjak	The Line	Čiara	Slovak
2016	Damjan Kozole	Nightlife	Nočno življenje	Slovenian
2015	Visar Morina	Babai		Kosovar
2014	György Pálfi	Free Fall	Szabadesés	Hungarian
2013	Jan Hřebejk	Honeymoon	Líbánky	Czech
2012	Rafaël Ouellet	Camion		Canadian
2011	Pascal Rabaté	Holidays by the Sea	Ni à vendre ni à louer	French
2010	Rajko Grlić	Just Between Us	Neka ostane medju nama	Croatian
2009	Andreas Dresen	Whiskey with Vodka	Whisky mit Wodka	German
2008	Alexey Uchitel	Captive	Plennyj	Russian
2007	Bård Breien	The Art of Negative Thinking	Kunsten å tenke negativt	Norwegian
2006	Joachim Trier	Reprise		Norwegian
2005	Krzysztof Krauze	My Nikifor	Mój Nikifor	Polish
2004	Xavier Bermúdez	León and Olvido	León y Olvido	Spanish
2003	Ferzan Ozpetek	Facing Windows	La finestra di fronte	Turkish
2002	Asghar Massombagi	Khaled		Iranian
2001	Ibolya Fekete	Chico		Hungarian
2000	Vinko Brešan	Marshal Tito's Spirit	Maršal	Croatian
1999	Aleksandr Rogozhkin	Checkpoint	Blokpost	Russian
1998	Charles Binamé	Streetheart	Le coeur au poing	Canadian
1997	Martine Dugowson	Shadow Play	Portraits chinois	French
1996	Péter Gothár	Vaska Easoff	Hagyjállógva Vászka	Hungarian
1995	Lars von Trier	The Kingdom	Riget	Danish
1994	Timur Bekmambetov, Gennadij Kajumov	Peshavar Waltz	Peshavarskiy vals	Russian
1992	Not conferred			
1990	Janusz Kijowski	State of Fear	Stan strachu	Polish
