= Robert Gliński =

Polish film director

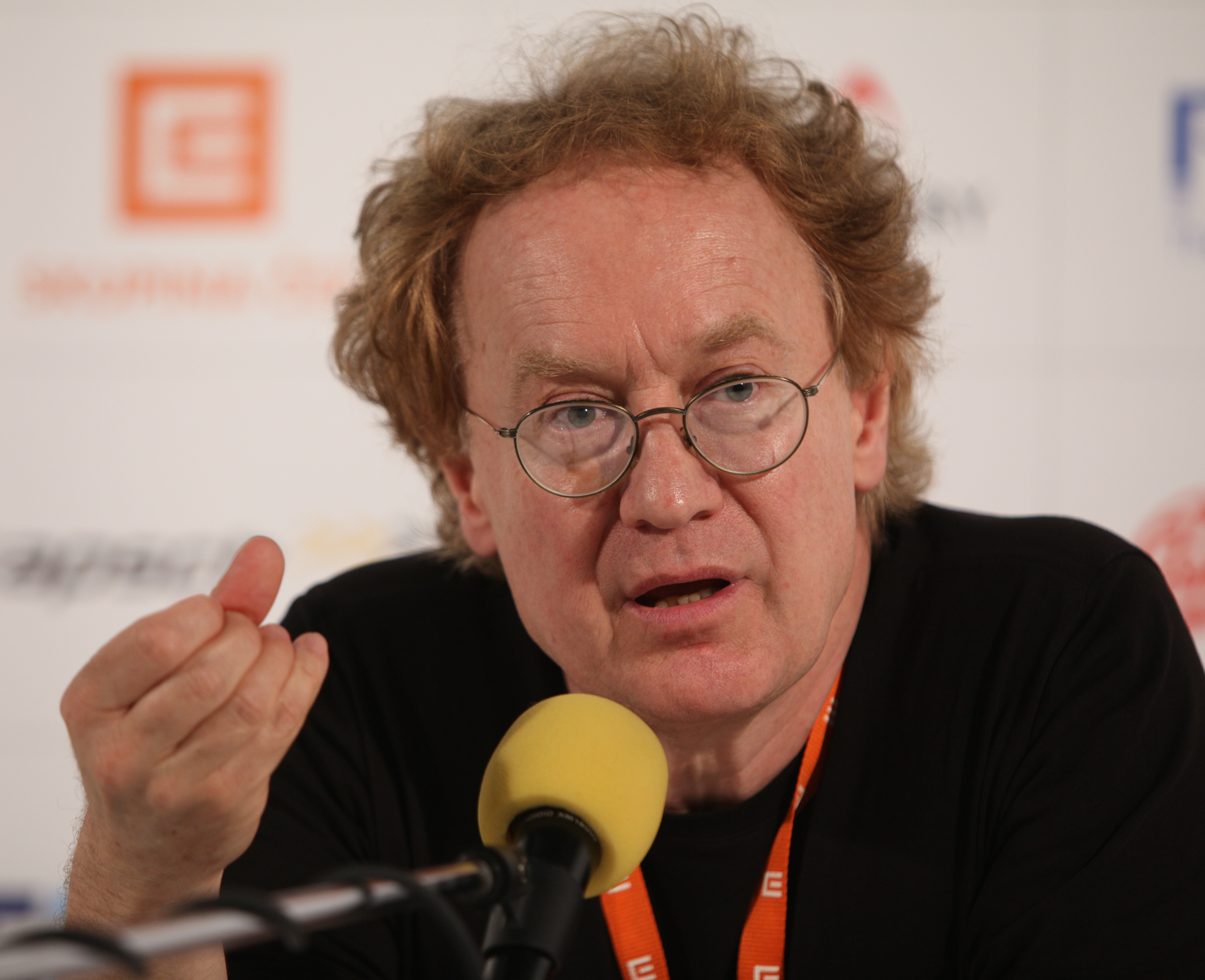
- Born: 17 April 1952 (age 74); Warsaw, Poland
- Occupation: Film director
- Years active: 1985–present

Robert Ignacy Gliński (born 17 April 1952 in Warsaw) is a Polish film director and screenwriter.

== Biography ==
Ignacy is a graduate of the National Film School in Łódź. He won the Golden Lions at the Gdynia Film Festival in 1992 with his film Wszystko, co najważniejsze and in 2001 with Cześć, Tereska. In 2002 he received an Eagle, the Polish Film Award for his film Cześć, Tereska.

Robert Gliński served as the Rector of the National Film School in Łódź from 2008 to 2012. He is the brother of Piotr Gliński.

== Selected filmography ==
- 1983: Niedzielne igraszki (Sunday Pranks)
- 1992: Wszystko, co najważniejsze (All That Really Matters)
- 1996: Matka swojej matki (Mother of Her Own Mother)
- 1997: Kochaj i rób co chcesz (Love Me and Do Whatever You Want)
- 2001: Cześć Tereska (Hi, Tereska)
- 2005: The Call of the Toad
- 2009: Świnki (Piggies)
- 2014: Kamienie na szaniec (Stones For the Rampart)
- 2017: Misery
