= Uyen Luu =

British food writer and photographer

- Born: 1977 (age 48–49); Ho Chi Minh City, Vietnam
- Education: Central Saint Martins
- Years active: 2009–present
- Culinary career
- Cooking style: Vietnamese
- Website: www.uyenluu.com

Uyen Luu (born 1977) is a British food writer and photographer, chef and filmmaker. She gained prominence through her blog and East London supper club Leluu and went on to author five cookbooks on Vietnamese cuisine.

== Early life ==
Luu was born in Ho Chi Minh City and moved to England in 1983 with her mother and brother as refugees. The family initially lived in Highbury and then between Clissold and Finsbury Park. Luu attended St Joan of Arc Catholic Primary School and a secondary school in Highgate. Luu graduated with a Bachelor of Arts (BA) from Central Saint Martins in 1999.

== Career ==
Luu began her career in film, directing and writing the 2000 short documentary Pho (Noodle Soup). From 2003, she ran a small fashion boutique called Love Leluu in central London. The business closed in 2009 due to debt.

After being taught to make Vietnamese food by her mother, Luu started the food blog Leluu and its corresponding supper club and cooking class in 2009. She initially collaborated with Simon Fernandez and joined the collective Grazing Asia in 2011 with Luiz Hara, MiMi Aye and May Chong in 2011. ES Magazine named Leluu a key part of London's Vietnamese food scene, while Food52 credited Luu with "[pioneering] the supper club movement". Luu also worked with Jamie Oliver's foundation and contributed to his website, television work, and YouTube channel. Luu's debut cookbook My Vietnamese Kitchen: Recipes and Stories to Bring Vietnamese Food to Life on Your Plate was published in 2013 via Ryland Peters & Small.

Having paused her supper club during the COVID-19 lockdown, Luu returned to cookbook writing with the publication of her second cookbook Vietnamese: Simple Vietnamese Food to Cook at Home in 2021 via Hardie Grant. Vietnamese was the inaugural Jamie Oliver Cookbook Club pick that July and named one of the best cookbooks of 2021 by The Observer and Time Out London among other publications. In early 2023, Sous Chef described Vietnamese as having "fast become one of the go-to titles for simple but flavour-packed Vietnamese recipes". Her third cookbook Vietnamese Vegetarian: Simple Vegetarian Recipes from a Vietnamese Home Kitchen was published in 2023. Vietnamese Vegetarian was nominated for a German Cookery Book Award and named one of the best cookbooks of 2023 by InsideHook.

This was followed by Recipes from My Vietnamese Kitchen: Authentic Food to Awaken the Senses & Feed the Soul and Quick and Easy Vietnamese: Everyday Vietnamese Recipes for the Home Cook in 2024. Quick and Easy Vietnamese was a finalist for the International or Regional Cookery Book Award at the 2025 Guild of Food Writers (GFW) Awards.

== Bibliography ==
=== Cookbooks ===
- My Vietnamese Kitchen: Recipes and Stories to Bring Vietnamese Food to Life on Your Plate (2013)
- Vietnamese: Simple Vietnamese Food to Cook at Home (2021)
- Vietnamese Vegetarian: Simple Vegetarian Recipes from a Vietnamese Home Kitchen (2023)
- Recipes from My Vietnamese Kitchen: Authentic Food to Awaken the Senses & Feed the Soul (2024)
- Quick and Easy Vietnamese: Everyday Vietnamese Recipes for the Home Cook (2024)

=== Contributions ===
- Chapter in For the Love of Cooking (2014) by Yvonne Niewerth and Charlotte Schreiber
- Feature in J'aime London: 100 Culinary Destinations for Food Lovers (2014) by Alain Ducasse
- Feature in East London Food (2014) by Rosie Birkett
- Recipes in The Really Quite Good British Cookbook: The food we love from 100 of our best chefs, cooks, bakers and local heroes (2017), edited by William Sitwell
- Recipe in Made in London: The Cookbook (2018) by Leah Hyslop
