= Son of Saul =

2015 Hungarian historical film

- Hungarian theatrical release poster
- Directed by: László Nemes
- Written by: László Nemes; Clara Royer
- Produced by: Gábor Sipos; Gábor Rajna
- Starring: Géza Röhrig; Levente Molnár; Urs Rechn; Todd Charmont; Sándor Zsótér; Amitai Kedar; Uwe Lauer; Christian Harting
- Cinematography: Mátyás Erdély
- Edited by: Matthieu Taponier
- Music by: László Melis
- Production company: Laokoon Filmgroup
- Distributed by: Mozinet
- Release dates: 15 May 2015 (Cannes); 11 June 2015 (Hungary)
- Running time: 107 minutes
- Country: Hungary
- Languages: German; Hungarian; Polish; Yiddish; Russian; Slovak; Czech; Greek
- Budget: €1.5 million
- Box office: $9.7 million

Son of Saul (Hungarian: Saul fia) is a 2015 Hungarian historical drama film directed by László Nemes, in his feature directorial debut, and co-written by Nemes and Clara Royer. It is set in the Auschwitz concentration camp during World War II, and follows a day-and-a-half in the life of Saul Ausländer (played by Géza Röhrig), a Hungarian member of the Sonderkommando.

The film premiered at the 2015 Cannes Film Festival, where it won the Grand Prix, and was later screened in the Special Presentations section of the 2015 Toronto International Film Festival. The film won the award for Best Foreign Language Film at the 88th Academy Awards. It is the ninth Hungarian film to be nominated for the award, and the first since István Szabó's Hanussen in 1988. It is the second Hungarian film to win the award, the first being Szabó's Mephisto in 1981. It also won the Golden Globe for Best Foreign Language Film, becoming the first Hungarian film to win the award.

== Plot ==
In October 1944, Jewish–Hungarian prisoner Saul Ausländer works as a Sonderkommando at the gas chambers in Auschwitz. He works stoically, seemingly numbed by the daily atrocities. Among the dead after a gassing, Saul sees a still living boy suffocated by a Nazi doctor who calls for an autopsy. Saul carries the body to Miklós Nyiszli, a fellow Hungarian prisoner and a forced assistant to Josef Mengele, and asks him not to cut up the boy so that he can receive a proper Jewish burial. Miklós declines, but says he can have five minutes alone with the boy that night before the cremation. Saul asks Rabbi Frankel to help perform a funeral ritual, but the rabbi dismisses him and suggests that Saul perform the burial himself.

Saul overhears Sonderkommando Abraham talk about an uprising with Oberkapo Biederman. Biederman first wants to photograph the camp's horrors using a camera collected from the dead, and smuggle the pictures outside to attract attention and help. Abraham tells Saul of "the Renegade", a Greek Rabbi who has lost his faith. In return, Saul offers his assistance in their plan. He pretends to fix the lock of a shack, while a fellow prisoner hides inside and takes pictures of a cremation in a fire pit.

Saul sneaks into another Sonderkommando unit and finds the Renegade at a riverbank, where ashes are dumped into the river. The Renegade refuses to help; Saul in turn throws the man's shovel into the water. The rabbi jumps into the river but Saul pulls him out, and both are then taken to the SS-commandant of the unit. After an interrogation, the Renegade is executed and Saul is allowed to go back to the unit. Back at the camp, Saul sneaks into Miklós's office but fails to find the boy's body, before being mocked and kicked out of the room by a group of Nazi officers. He confronts Miklós, who assures him that the body has been hidden for safety. Saul finds the body and takes it back to his own barrack in a sack.

That night, SS-commandant Moll orders Biederman to write up a list of seventy names, leading Biederman to believe that his unit will soon be killed. Biederman discloses the information to Abraham, who instructs Saul to head to the women's camp and pick up a package of gunpowder from a prisoner named Ella. Ella, who knows Saul, calls him by name and clasps his hand, but he withdraws. After collecting the package, Saul looks for a rabbi among a line of newly arrived Hungarian Jews, who are being led into the woods for execution. A Frenchman named Braun approaches him and convinces Saul that he is a rabbi. Saul disguises Braun as a Sonderkommando and sneaks him into the camp. When Saul arrives at the camp, he is confronted by Abraham and realizes that during the turmoil in the woods he has lost the package. On further questioning, he says that the murdered boy is his illegitimate son, an assertion Abraham says is not true.

The next morning, the prisoners are summoned into the crematorium to get back to work, where they discover that Biederman and his unit have been murdered. Abraham rallies the other prisoners and attack the SS guards, starting the rebellion. During the commotion, Saul retrieves the boy's corpse and escapes to the woods with Braun and a few other prisoners. He prepares to bury the boy by a river, only to discover that Braun is a fraud when he cannot recite the Kaddish. Hearing the guards approaching, Saul tries to carry the body across the river, but loses his grasp and is pulled out of the water by Rabbi Frankel as the corpse floats away. The prisoners then hide at a shed in a forest and start to discuss a plan to join the Polish resistance. Saul notices a young peasant boy peeking into the shed and smiles for the only time in the story. The boy runs away before an SS officer grabs and silences him as guards approach the shed. The officer then releases him, and the boy runs into the woods as the sound of gunfire echoes behind him.

== Cast ==
- Géza Röhrig as Saul Ausländer
- Levente Molnár as Abraham Warszawski
- Urs Rechn as Oberkapo Biederman
- Sándor Zsótér as Dr. Miklós Nyiszli
- Todd Charmont as Braun
- Uwe Lauer as Oberscharführer Voss
- Christian Harting as Oberscharführer Busch
- Kamil Dobrowolski as Oberkapo Mietek
- Jerzy Walczak as Sonderkommando rabbi
- Marcin Czarnik as Feigenbaum
- István Pion as Katz
- Attila Fritz as Yankl
- Amitai Kedar as Hirsch
- Márton Ágh as Greek rabbi Apikoyres
- Levente Orbán as a Russian prisoner
- Tom Pilath as an Oberscharführer
- Mihály Kormos as Kapo Schlojmem
- Juli Jakab as Ella
- Mendy Cahan as a Sonderkommando
- Jeles András as Josef Mengele

== Production ==
=== Development ===
Nemes conceived of the film from the book The Scrolls of Auschwitz, a collection of testimonies by Sonderkommando members, after discovering it during the production of Béla Tarr's The Man from London in 2005 when he was working as Tarr's assistant. Nemes started working on the screenplay with Royer in 2010 and completed the first draft in 2011. The writers spent several years on research, while historians such as Gideon Greif, Philippe Mesnard and Zoltán Vági provided support for the film.

The project struggled to find financial backers due to the film's unconventional approach and Nemes's lack of experience in directing a feature film. Originally intended to be a French production with a French protagonist, the film was produced entirely in Hungary. After potential co-production partners in France, Israel, Germany and Austria turned down the project, the €1.5 million budget was ultimately covered by the Hungarian National Film Fund, Hungarian tax credits and the Claims Conference, accounting respectively for 70%, 25% and 5%.

=== Casting ===
Nemes insisted on casting actors who spoke their characters' own languages. New York City-based Hungarian poet Géza Röhrig, who had not acted in film since the 1980s, was cast as the main character, Saul, after being considered originally for a supporting role.

=== Filming ===
The film was shot on 35 mm film in 28 days in Budafok, Budapest. A 40 mm lens and the Academy aspect ratio of 1.375:1 were adopted to realise shallow focus and a portrait-like narrow field of vision. Architect and liberal activist László Rajk, who also worked on the permanent Hungarian exhibition at the Auschwitz-Birkenau State Museum, designed the re-creation of the crematoria.

=== Post-production ===
The film took five months of sound design. Human voices in eight languages were recorded and attached to the original recording of the production. Sound designer Tamás Zányi described the sound in the film "as a sort of acoustic counterpoint to the intentionally narrowed imagery". The film is composed of 85 shots.

== Release ==
The film premiered in competition at the 68th Cannes Film Festival on 15 May 2015, where it won the Grand Prix. The filmmakers initially tried to premiere the film at the 65th Berlin International Film Festival, but after the festival offered them a spot only in the Panorama section, not in the main competition, they decided to refuse the proposal and instead aim for the Cannes competition.

In Hungary, the film was released on 11 June 2015 and sold more than 220,000 tickets, placing it as the highest-grossing domestic film released since the slapstick comedy Üvegtigris 3 in 2010.

Shortly after its Cannes premiere, Sony Pictures Classics acquired North American distribution rights to the film, theatrically releasing it in the United States on December 13, 2015.

== Reception ==
Upon its release at Cannes, the film was met with critical acclaim. On the review aggregation website Rotten Tomatoes, the film has an approval rating of 96% based on reviews from 233 critics, with an average rating of 8.90/10. The site's critical consensus reads, "Grimly intense yet thoroughly rewarding, Son of Saul offers an unforgettable viewing experience – and establishes director László Nemes as a talent to watch". On Metacritic, the film has a score of 91 out of 100, based on reviews from 49 critics, indicating "universal acclaim".

In his review for The Guardian, Peter Bradshaw rated the film five out of five stars, calling it an "astonishing debut film" and "a horror movie of extraordinary focus and courage". He ended his review writing: "Nemes's film has found a way to create a fictional drama with a gaunt, fierce kind of courage...." Writing for Time Out, Dave Calhoun also gave the film five out of five stars. Indiewire's Eric Kohn awarded the film an A− rating, calling it "a remarkable refashioning of the Holocaust drama that reignites the setting with extraordinary immediacy". In his review written for The Hollywood Reporter, Boyd van Hoeij praised the cinematography and the soundwork of the film. He writes: "Shot (and shown in Cannes) on 35mm, often in sickly greens and yellows and with deep shadows, Erdely's cinematography is one of the film's major assets, but it wouldn't be half as effective without the soundwork, which plays a major role in suggesting what is happening around Saul, with audiences often forced to rely on the sound to imagine the whole, horrible picture". Writing for The Film Stage, Giovanni Marchini Camia gave the film an A rating, and called it "a towering landmark for filmic fictionalizations of the Holocaust". A.A. Dowd of The A.V. Club gave the film an A− rating, and praised the movie's unique perspective: "Son of Saul is the rare Holocaust drama that finds actual drama, and not just despair, in the living hell of a concentration camp". [...] "Son of Saul sees humanity in effort, identity in action; it watches someone with nothing, a man reduced to a statistic, get a piece of himself back, mostly by finding some meaning in a place of meaningless evil".

Claude Lanzmann, director of the documentary Shoah, gave the film high praise, stating that "it's a very new film, very original, very unusual. It's a film that gives a very real sense of what it was like to be in the Sonderkommando. It's not at all melodramatic. It's done with a very great modesty". Philosopher Georges Didi-Huberman also praised the film, and he wrote a 25-page open letter to Nemes, which opened with "Your film, ‘Son of Saul,' is a monster. A necessary, coherent, beneficial, innocent monster".

Nemes was questioned about the similarities between Son of Saul and the 2001 film The Grey Zone, with Nemes replying "But mine is an Anti-Grey Zone! [...] in The Grey Zone, the inmates spoke in English. Also Nelson's film shows too much, relying on constant emotional upheaval that is theatrical [...] We used a restrained strategy to tell very little. When you are not limited, cinema can take you to over-expression and spectacle."

In a 2016 BBC poll, critics voted the film the 34th greatest since 2000.

In 2019, The Guardian critics ranked the film 12th in its Best Films of the 21st Century list.

== Accolades ==
At the Cannes Film Festival the film won the Grand Prix and the FIPRESCI Prize in the main competition section. The film also won the François Chalais Prize and the Vulcan Award. At the 88th Academy Awards, Son of Saul won the Academy Award for Best Foreign Language Film.

List of accolades
| Award / Film Festival | Category | Recipient(s) | Result | Ref. |
|---|---|---|---|---|
| Academy Awards | Best Foreign Language Film | Hungary | Won | |
| American Society of Cinematographers Awards | Spotlight Award | Mátyás Erdély (tied with Adam Arkapaw for Macbeth) | Won | |
| Australian Film Critics Association | Best International Film (Foreign Language) | Son of Saul | Nominated | |
| Belgian Film Critics Association | Grand Prix | Son of Saul | Won | |
| British Academy Film Awards | Best Film Not in the English Language | Son of Saul | Won | |
| British Independent Film Awards | Best International Independent Film | Son of Saul | Nominated | |
| Camerimage | Bronze Frog | Mátyás Erdély | Won | |
| Cannes Film Festival | Palme d'Or | László Nemes | Nominated | |
| Cannes Film Festival | Grand Prix | László Nemes | Won | |
| Cannes Film Festival | FIPRESCI Prize | László Nemes | Won | |
| Cannes Film Festival | François Chalais Prize | László Nemes | Won | |
| Cannes Film Festival | Vulcan Award | Tamás Zányi | Won | |
| Cannes Film Festival | Caméra d'Or | László Nemes | Nominated | |
| César Awards | Best Foreign Film | Son of Saul | Nominated | |
| Chicago Film Critics Association | Best Foreign Language Film | Son of Saul | Won | |
| Critics' Choice Awards | Best Foreign Language Film | Son of Saul | Won | |
| Dallas–Fort Worth Film Critics Association | Best Foreign Language Film | Son of Saul | Won | |
| Directors Guild of America Awards | First-Time Feature Film | László Nemes | Nominated | |
| Dorian Awards | Foreign Language Film of the Year | Son of Saul | Won | |
| French Syndicate of Cinema Critics | Best Foreign Film | Son of Saul | Won | |
| Golden Globe Awards | Best Foreign Language Film | Son of Saul | Won | |
| Guldbagge Awards | Best Foreign Film | Son of Saul | Won | |
| Houston Film Critics Society | Best Foreign Language Film | Son of Saul | Won | |
| Independent Spirit Awards | Best International Film | Son of Saul | Won | |
| Los Angeles Film Critics Association | Best Foreign Language Film | Son of Saul | Won | |
| Los Angeles Film Critics Association | Best Actor | Géza Röhrig | Runner-up | |
| Manaki Brothers Film Festival | Golden Camera 300 | Mátyás Erdély | Won | |
| Motion Picture Sound Editors Golden Reel Awards | Foreign Feature Film | Tamás Zányi, Tamás Beke, and Tamás Székely | Won | |
| National Board of Review | Best Foreign Language Film | Son of Saul | Won | |
| New York Film Critics Circle | Best First Film | Son of Saul | Won | |
| New York Film Critics Online | Best Foreign Language Film | Son of Saul | Won | |
| Online Film Critics Society | Best Film Not in the English Language | Son of Saul | Nominated | |
| San Francisco Film Critics Circle | Best Foreign Language Film | Son of Saul | Won | |
| Satellite Awards | Best Foreign Language Film | Son of Saul | Won | |
| Washington D.C. Area Film Critics Association | Best Foreign Language Film | Son of Saul | Won | |

== See also ==
- List of submissions to the 88th Academy Awards for Best Foreign Language Film
- List of Hungarian submissions for the Academy Award for Best Foreign Language Film
- List of Holocaust films
