= Clara Royer =

French writer and screenwriter (born 1981)

Clara Royer (born 1981) is a French writer and screenwriter. Her first novel, entitled Csillag, was published in 2011. She is the co-writer of the 2015 Hungarian film Son of Saul, which won the award for Best Foreign Language Film at the 88th Academy Awards.
