= Ibolya Fekete =

Hungarian film director (born 1951)

Ibolya Fekete (Hungarian pronunciation: [ˈibojɒ ˈfɛkɛtɛ]; born 23 January 1951 in Pásztó) is a Hungarian film director and screenwriter.

== Biography ==
After completing her studies of Hungarian and Russian literature and linguistics at the Lajos Kossuth University in Debrecen (now part of the University of Debrecen) in 1976, Ibolya Fekete first worked as a screenwriter, amongst others for György Szomjas, before she also started to work as a dramaturge for Hunnia Filmstudio, one of the four Hungarian film studios joined under the common brand of Mafilm in 1990, she made her debut as director with documentary Berlin and Back.

Since 2003 teaching at the Budapest Filmacademy, she currently also works as a guest professor at the Sapientia Hungarian University of Transylvania in Cluj-Napoca, Romania. She is also teaching film direction at Budapest Metropolitan University in Budapest.

== Filmography ==
Year	Title	Writer	Director	Notes	Ref.
1985	Falfúró (Wall Driller)	Yes	No		
1985	Mr. Universe	Yes	No		
1989	Könnyű vér (Fast and Loose)	Yes	No		
1990	Berlinből Berlinbe (Berlin and Back)	No	Yes	documentary	
1991;1992	Az apokalipszis gyermekei I-II (Children of the Apocalypse I-II)	No	Yes	documentary	
1996	Bolse vita	Yes	Yes		
1997	Négy dal Kelet-Európából (Four songs from Eastern Europe)	Yes	Yes	documentary	
1997	Négy dal Kelet-Európából (Four songs from Eastern Europe)	Yes	Yes	documentary	
2001	Chico	Yes	Yes		
2001	Documentaries“ (Dokumentátorok)	No	Yes	documentary	
2002	Simó Sándor (Sándor Simó)	No	Yes	documentary	
2004	Utazások egy szerzetessel (Journeys with a Monk)	No	Yes	documentary	
2005	The Master and Margarita	No	Yes	TV short	
2007	The Csángós	No	Yes	documentary	
2015	Mom and Other Loonies in the Family	Yes	Yes		

== Awards ==
- Bolse Vita (1996)
  - Main Prize at the Angers European First Film Festival, France, 1997
- Chico (2001)
  - Ecumenical Award and Best Director Award at the Karlovy Vary International Film Festival, 2001
  - Special Jury Award during WorldFest-Houston International Film Festival, USA, 2007
