= László Nemes =

Hungarian film director and screenwriter

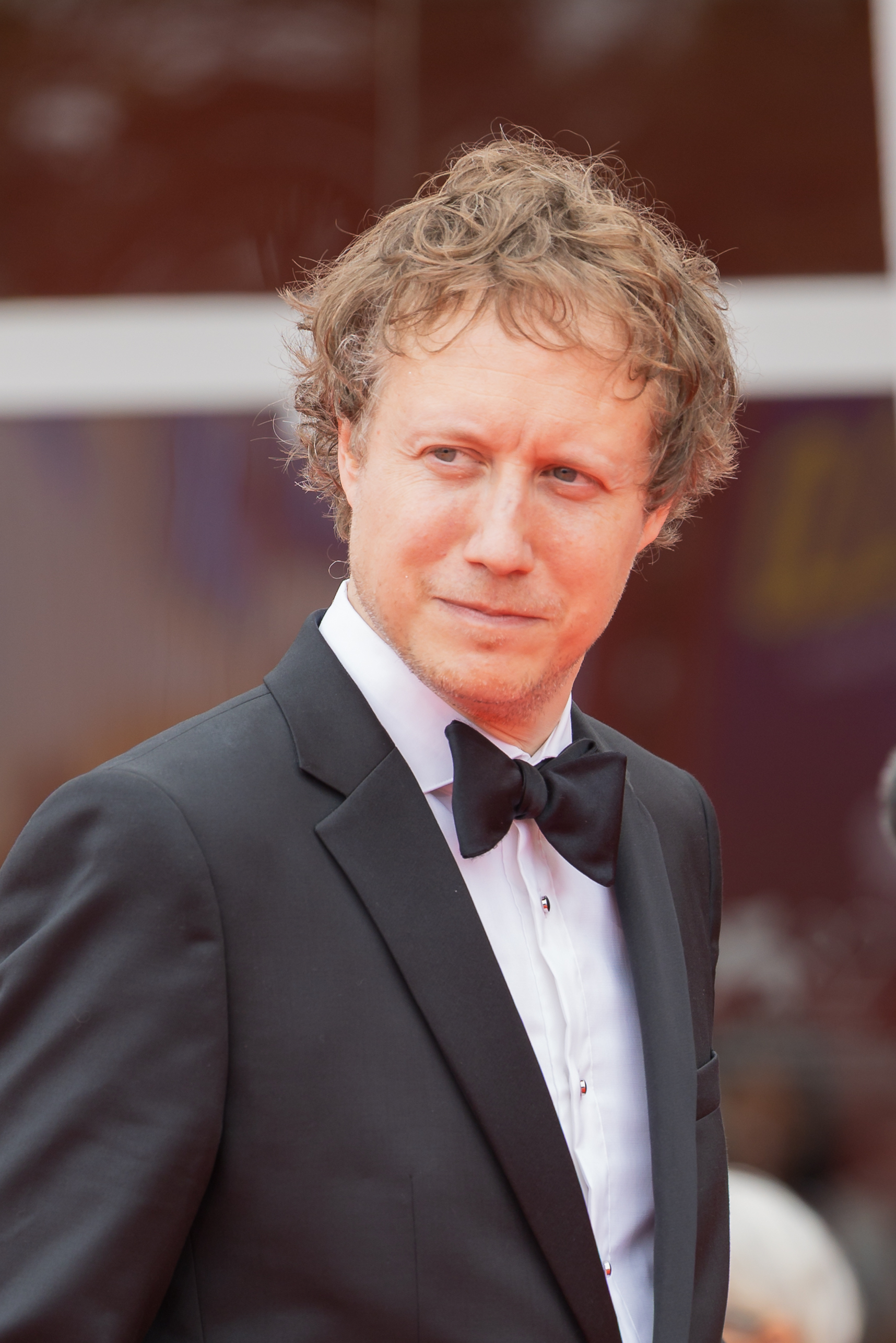
- Nemes in 2025
- Born: Nemes Jeles László; 18 February 1977 (age 49); Budapest, Hungary
- Occupations: Film director, screenwriter
- Years active: 1999-present
- Father: András Jeles

László Nemes (born Nemes Jeles László; Hungarian: [ˈnɛmɛʃ ˈjɛlɛʃ ˈlaːsloː]; 18 February 1977) is a Hungarian filmmaker. His films usually explore Jewish social and political resistance in 20th century Hungary, featuring long takes and meticulously dressed historical sets.

He is most known for his debut feature film Son of Saul (2015), which won the Grand Prix at the 2015 Cannes Film Festival, the Golden Globe for Best Foreign Language Film and Hungary's second Academy Award for Best Foreign Language Film.

== Early life ==
Nemes was born in Budapest as the son of a Jewish mother and the Hungarian film and theater director András Jeles. He moved to Paris after the fall of Communism, at the age of 12. Nemes became interested in filmmaking at an early age and began filming amateur horror films in the basement of his Paris home. After studying History, International Relations and Screenwriting, he started working as an assistant director in France and Hungary on short and feature films. For two years, he worked as Béla Tarr's assistant during the filming of The Man from London.

== Career ==
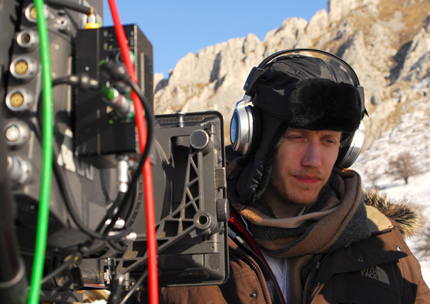
Nemes in 2007 filming With a Little Patience

After directing his first 35mm short film, With a Little Patience, in September 2006, he moved to New York to study film directing at New York University's Tisch School of the Arts. Beginning in September 2011, he spent five months in Sciences Po Paris as part of a scholarship program arranged by the Cinéfondation, where he and Clara Royer developed the script for Son of Saul. In 2012, they continued intensive work on the screenplay for seven months at the Jerusalem International Film Lab rubbing shoulders with emerging directors such as Boo Junfeng and Morgan Simon. Also in 2012, he developed his first project which would eventually be his second feature film (Sunset), through the TorinoFilmLab Script&Pitch programme in 2012 and the Framework programme in 2015.

His debut feature film, Son of Saul (2015), followed Saul Ausländer (played by Géza Röhrig), a Hungarian member of the Sonderkommando. The film had its world premiere at the main competition of the 68th Cannes Film Festival, where it was nominated for the Palme d'Or and the Caméra d'Or, winning the Grand Prix (the second-most prestigious prize of the festival), alongside the FIPRESCI Prize and the François Chalais Prize. At the 73rd Golden Globe Awards, the film won Best Foreign Language Film, becoming the first and only Hungarian film to win it. At the 88th Academy Awards, it won Best Foreign Language Film, marking Hungary second win in the category.

In 2016, Nemes was a member of the main competition jury of the 2016 Cannes Film Festival.

Following the success of Son of Saul, his 2012's Sunset project was eventually reworked and released in 2018, having its world premiere at the main competition of the 75th Venice International Film Festival, where it was nominated for the Golden Lion. It was selected as the Hungarian submission for the Academy Award for Best Foreign Language Film, but it was not nominated.

After a seven years hiatus, Nemes returned with another Hungarian-set historical drama film, Orphan (2025), set in the aftermath of the Revolution of 1956 against the Communist regime in Budapest. The film had its world premiere at the main competition of the 82nd Venice International Film Festival, where it was nominated for the Golden Lion. It was also selected as the Hungarian entry for the Academy Award for Best International Feature Film.

Nemes French-language debut film, Moulin (2026), was written by Olivier Demangel. Starring Gilles Lellouche and Lars Eidinger, it follows Jean Moulin and the French Resistance networks during the World War II. The film had its world premiere at the main competition of the 2026 Cannes Film Festival on 17 May, marking Nemes return to the festival after eleven years.

=== Upcoming films ===
In May 2025, Nemes was confirmed as director and co-writer of an adaptation of Cormac McCarthy’s novel Outer Dark, starring Jacob Elordi and Lily-Rose Depp, filming is expected to began in 2026.

=== Influences ===
Nemes has named Michelangelo Antonioni, Andrei Tarkovsky, Ingmar Bergman, Terrence Malick, and Stanley Kubrick as some of his favorite directors.

== Personal life ==
=== Political beliefs ===
On March 15, 2024, Nemes shared a public statement with The Guardian condemning Jonathan Glazer's acceptance speech for The Zone of Interest winning Best International Feature at the 96th Academy Awards. In his speech, Glazer stated he and producer James Wilson stood "... as men who refute their Jewishness and the Holocaust being hijacked by an occupation which has led to conflict for so many innocent people, whether the victims of October 7 in Israel or the ongoing attack on Gaza." Nemes stated that Glazer "... should have stayed silent instead of revealing he has no understanding of history and the forces undoing civilization, before or after the Holocaust..." and accused him of resorting to "talking points disseminated by propaganda meant to eradicate, at the end, all Jewish presence from the Earth." Nemes also suggested that the choice in the film to focus on the perpetrators of the Holocaust rather than the victims related to Glazer's speech, writing "[M]aybe it all makes sense, ironically... there is absolutely no Jewish presence on screen in The Zone of Interest. Let us all be shocked by the Holocaust, safely in the past, and not see how the world might eventually, one day, finish Hitler’s job - in the name of progress and endless good."

Nearly 18 months later, during the press conference of Orphan (2025) at the 82nd Venice International Film Festival, when questioned about his stance on the Gaza war and his remarks about Glazer in early 2024, Nemes stated "The big question for me – in film, in art, but also in everyday life – are you a humanist or an anti-humanist?" and concluded "It’s intertwined. We have seen in the 20th century what it can produce in the heart of civilization… we know what it can produce in the future. So, the real question is, where is the humanism in what we do? As a filmmaker, that’s my responsibility".

== Filmography ==
=== Feature films ===
Year	English Title	Original Title	Director	Writer	Notes
2015	Son of Saul	Saul fia	Yes	Yes	
2018	Sunset	Napszállta	Yes	Yes	
2025	Orphan	Árva	Yes	Yes	
2026	Moulin	Jean Moulin	Yes	No	French-language Debut
TBA	Outer Dark		Yes	Yes	Pre-production

=== Short films ===
Year	Title	Director	Writer	Producer
1999	Arrivals	Yes	Yes	No
2007	With a Little Patience	Yes	Yes	No
2008	The Counterpart	Yes	Yes	No
2010	The Gentleman Takes His Leave	Yes	Yes	Yes

== Accolades ==
- Kossuth Prize (2016)

Short film

- 2007 - Hungarian Society of Cinematographers - Best Short Film
- 2007 - Hungarian Film Week - Best Short Film
- 2007 - Bilbao International Festival of Documentary and Short Films - Silver Mikeldi
- 2008 - Angers Premiers Plans - Best European Short Film
- 2008 - Angers Premiers Plans - ARTE Prize
- 2008 - Angers Premiers Plans - Best Actress: Virág Marjai
- 2008 - Athens International Film & Video Festival - Black Bear Award
- 2008 - Mediawave International Film Festival - Best Cinematography
- 2008 - Indie Lisboa International Film Festival - Onda Curta Award
- 2010 - NexT International Film Festival Bucharest - "Cristian Nemescu" Best Directing Award

Feature film

- 2015 - Cannes Film Festival - Grand Prix
- 2015 - Cannes Film Festival - FIPRESCI Competition Award
- 2015 - Cannes Film Festival - François Chalais Prize
- 2015 - Golden Globe for Best Foreign Language Film
- 2016 - Independent Spirit Award for Best International Film
- 2016 - Academy Award for Best Foreign Language Film
- 2017 - BAFTA Award for Best Film Not in the English Language
- 2018 - 75th Venice International Film Festival - FIPRESCI Award
- 2018 - 15th Seville Film Festival - Eurimages Award To The Best European Coproduction
- 2019 - 9th Beijing International Film Festival - The Best Director
