= Tamer Levent =

Turkish actor

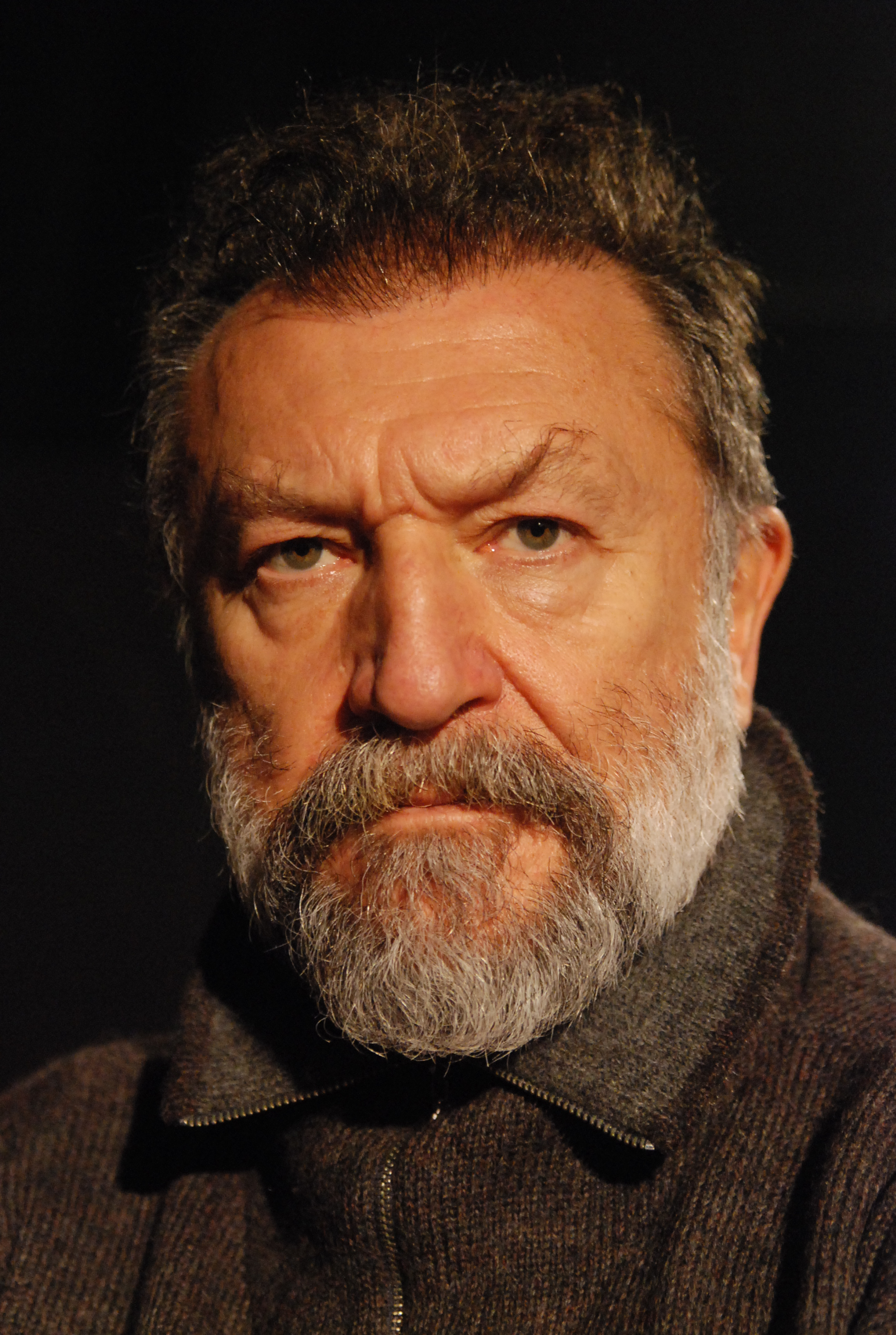
- Levent in 2008
- Born: 1950 (age 74–75); Karşıyaka, İzmir, Turkey
- Occupation: Actor
- Years active: 1977–present
- Spouse: Seynan Sezgin (m. 1982)
- Children: 2
- Website: tamerlevent.com

Tamer Levent (born 1950) is a Turkish actor, director, art director and writer. In 1971, he joined the Ankara State Conservatory and entered the Department of Theater: he graduated in 1977. He first worked as an actor and then as a director in State Theaters. He later served as general director of State Theaters and deputy general director.

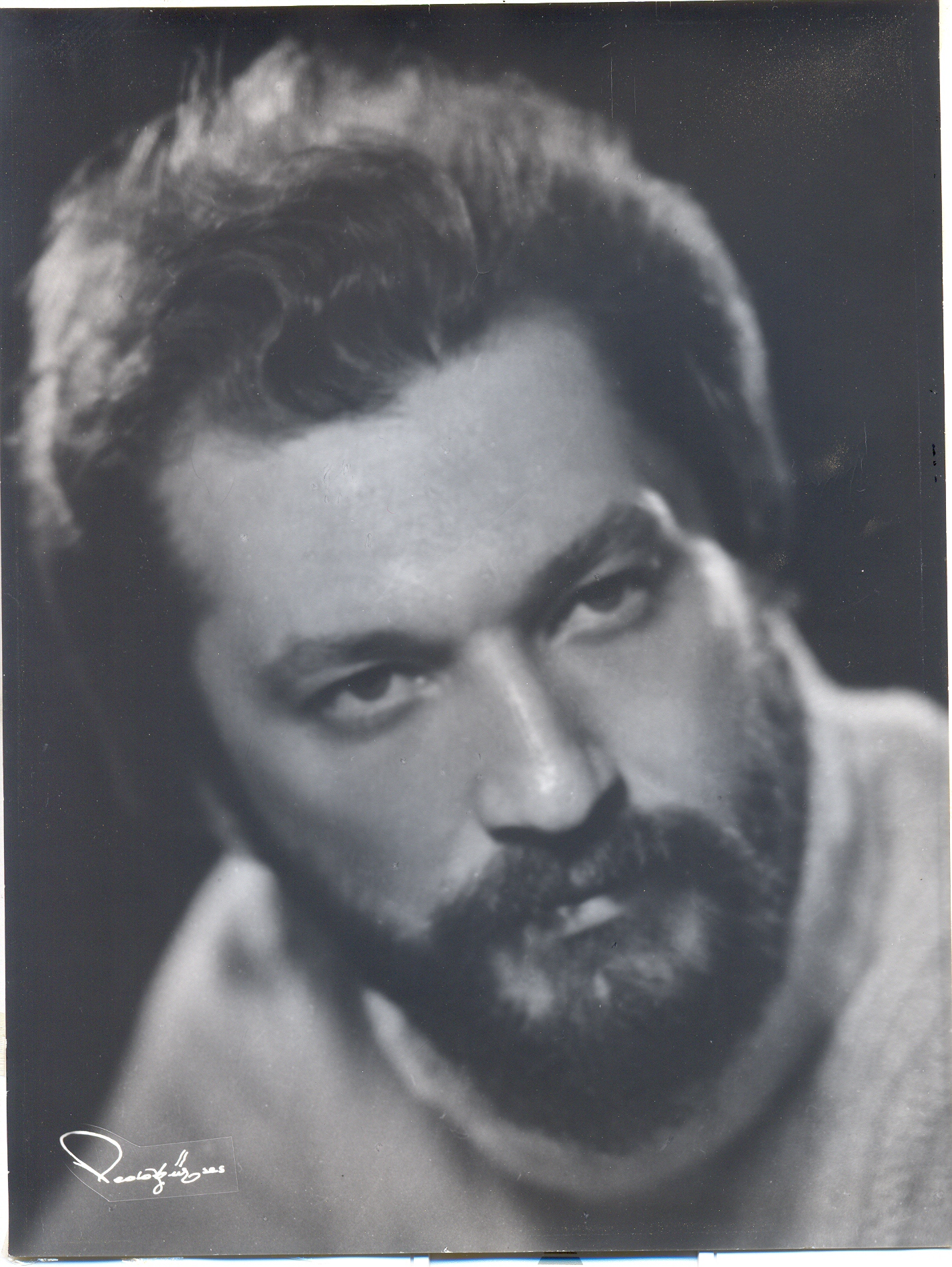
Levent during his first year in conservatory

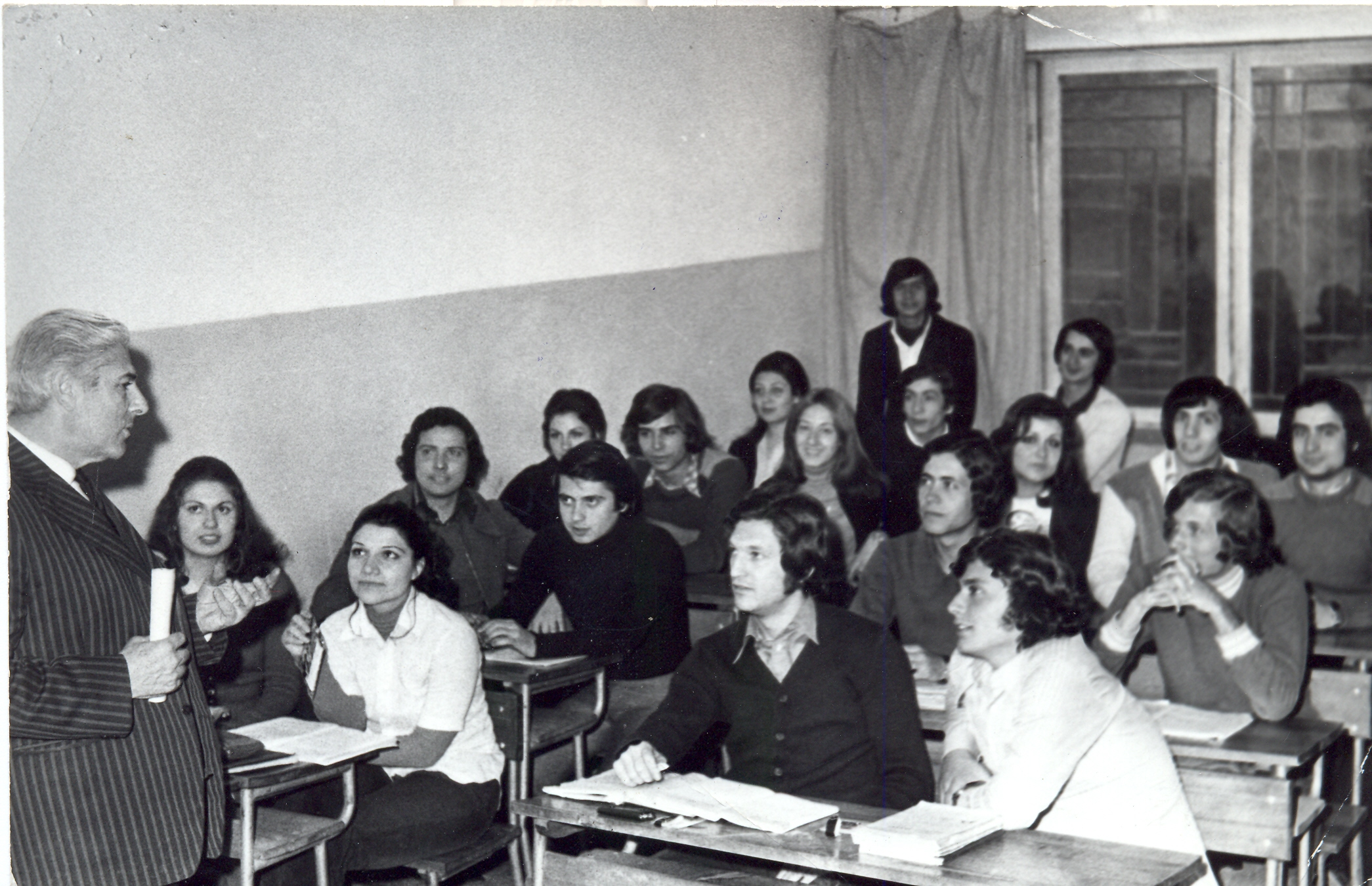
Ankara State Conservatory 1974–75 season students. Levent at the diction teacher Nüzhet Şenbay's class, with his friend Haluk Bilginer

== Film and television ==
- Tepenin Ardı - Emin Alper, 2012 It was selected the Best Film at the 2012 Berlin International Film Festival, Forum section (Caligari Film Prize). It was also named the Best Film at the International Istanbul Film Festival. At the 6th Asia Pacific Cinema Academy Awards (APSA), it was awarded as the Best Themed Film.
- Kış Uykusu, 2014 - Nuri Bilge Ceylan (It received the Palme d'Or at the 2014 Cannes Film Festival and was chosen as the Best Film by FIPRESCI).

== International judging panel memberships ==
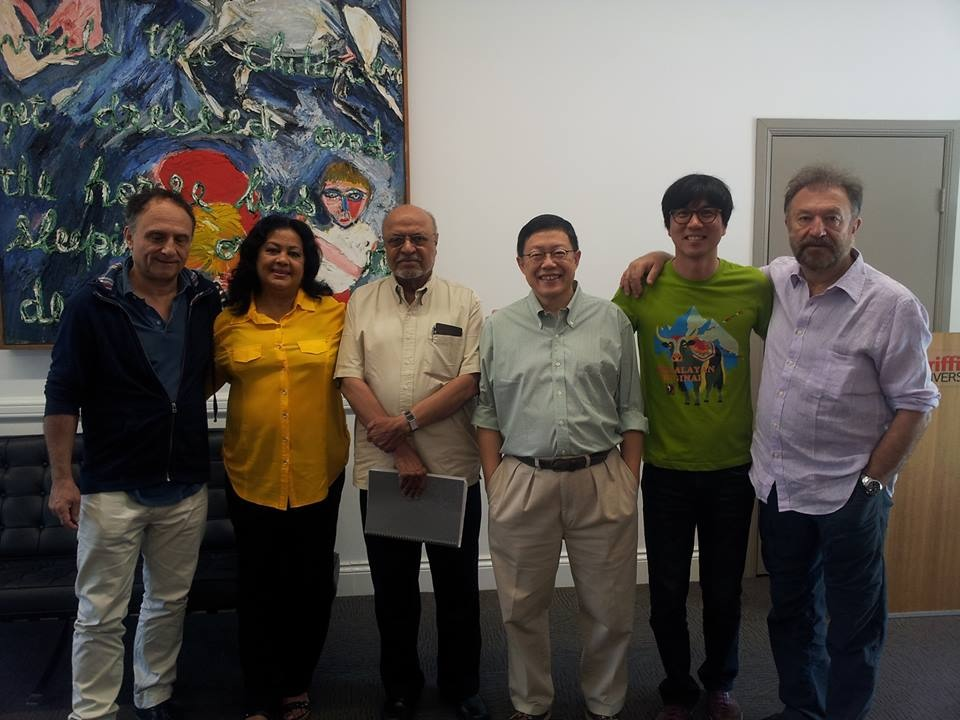
Levent (far right) with the other Judges of the 7th Asia Pacific Cinema Academy Awards (APSA)

- 7th Asia Pacific Cinema Academy Awards (APSA) - judge

== Books ==
- Niçin Tiyatro (articles), Gündoğan Publications
- Ya Tutarsa (play), Mitos - Boyut Publications

== Awards ==
- 45th Ankara Arts Association Theater Awards 2009, "Best Actor" award
- 6th Asia Pacific Cinema Academy awards (APSA); He was selected as the best actor nominee with two other country nominees for his role in the movie Tepenin Ardı.
- He was chosen as the best actor at the 24th Ankara Film Festival for his role in the film Tepenin Ardı.
- At the 3rd Malatya Film Festival, he was selected as the best actor with his co-stars, Mehmet Özgür, Reha Özcan, Berk Hakman, and Furkan Berk Kiran.
- 81st Language Festival Honorary Award 2013 Language Association
- 20th Sadri Alışık Theater and Cinema Actor Awards Selection Committee Special Award (Kış Uykusu)
- 4th New Magazine Theater Awards 2016 Honor Award
- 2016 İsmet Küntay Honor Award
- TAKSAV 21st International Ankara Theater Festival "Festival Honorary Award" 2016
