= Kök =

Turkish rock band

- Also known as: Grup Kök
- Origin: Istanbul, Turkey
- Genres: Progressive rock; funk rock; alternative rock
- Years active: 2006–present
- Labels: Anadolu Müzik; Kabak-Lin
- Members: Cem Ömeroğlu; Kerem Tüzün; Kaan Sezyum

Kök, also known as Grup Kök, are a Turkish rock band founded in 2006 by former Nekropsi member Cem Ömeroğlu, former Nekropsi and Kurban member Kerem Tüzün and Kaan Sezyum.

The style of the group is defined as "interpretation of progressive funk rock music with Anatolian melodies". Also known for making alternative rock music, the band also uses elements of metal and psychedelic rock in their records.

== History ==
The foundations of Kök were laid in 2003 at the ITU Music Advanced Research Center, where Cem Ömeroğlu and Kerem Tüzün were students. Continuing with composing songs and studio sessions together with the participation of former drummer Kaan Sesium of the Siddartha band, Kök gave their first concert in Peyote in June 2008. In the following years, the band shared many tracks and demos on the Internet until the 2013 release of their first album Bilmece, which was postponed for a long time and coincided with the Gezi Park protests. Kök released a single titled "Dalgın" in 2015.

In 2018, the band was featured in a tribute album in honor of Cem Karaca titled Merhaba Gençler, in which they performed the song "Bindik Bir Alamete". In the same year, they released two singles, "Düş" and "Sanki". The cover for "Sanki" was designed by Burak Şentürk, who is known for his works with Green Day and Nike. The band has been working on a new album, the release date for which is yet to be determined.

== Band members ==
- Kaan Sezyum - drums
- Cem Ömeroğlu - guitar, vocals
- Kerem Tüzün - bass guitar, vocals

== Discography ==
Studio albums

- Bilmece (2013)

Singles

- "Dalgın" (2015)
- "Düş" (2018)
- "Sanki" (2018)
