= Burak Güven =

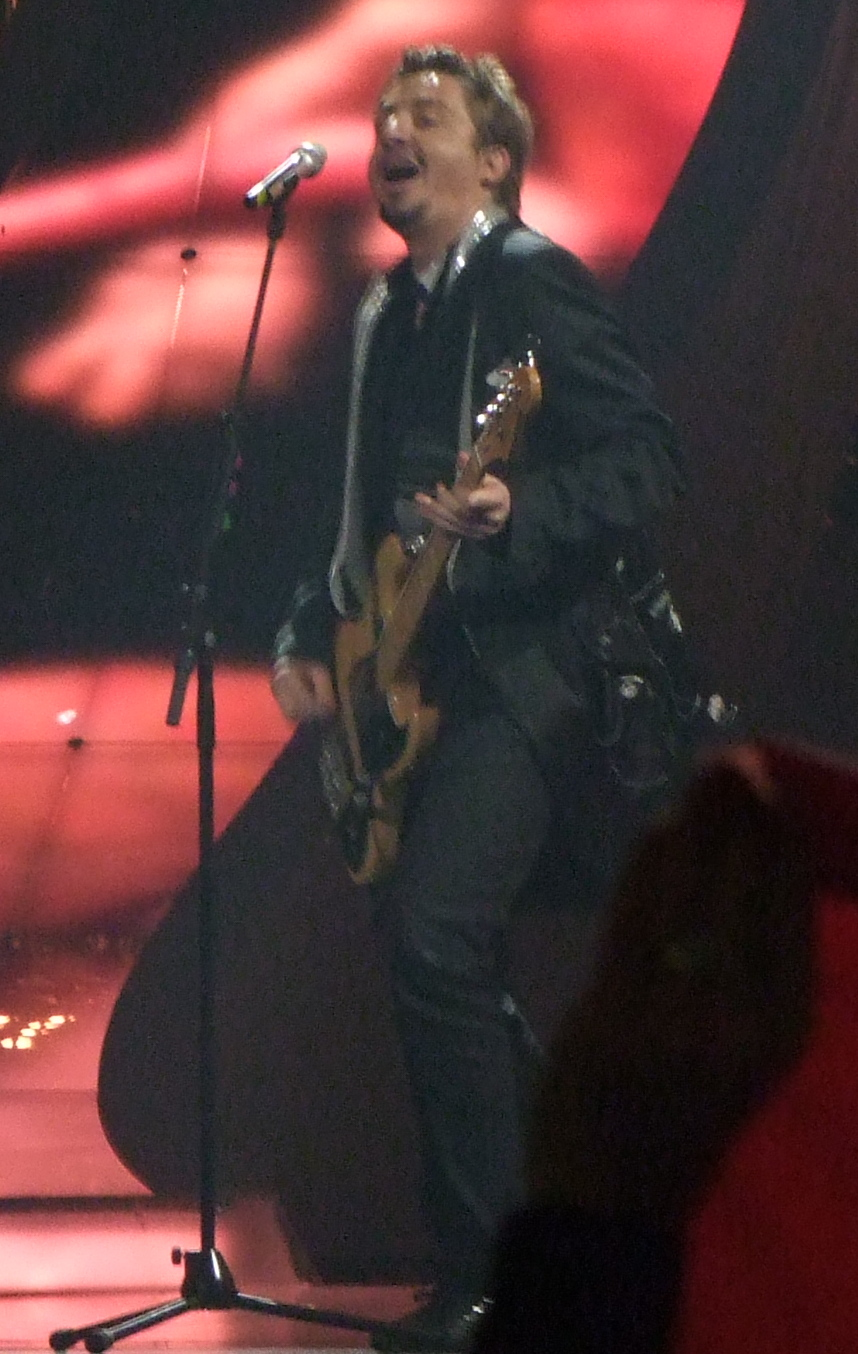

Background information
- Born: October 19, 1975 (age 50); Istanbul, Turkey
- Genres: Alternative rock, opera, blues.
- Occupations: Musician, singer, composer
- Instrument: Bass
- Label: Rakun
- Formerly of: Mor ve Ötesi, Istanbul Blues Company, Fahir Atakoğlu, Nekropsi
- Website: morveotesi.com

Burak Güven (born October 19, 1975) is a Turkish musician, bass player, and one of the backing singers in the rock band Mor ve Ötesi

== Early life ==
Güven was born in Istanbul, Turkey. From 1993 to 2000, he studied singing at the State Conservatory of Istanbul. Before he became a member of Mor ve Ötesi, he sang in the choir and opera.

At age 14, Güven bought his first guitar. At age 15, he joined Virus with four friends and was a vocalist. After disagreements with guitarist Erke Erokay, he left the group. He then worked with pop performer Eric Coker and sang in cafes and bars.

== Career ==
In 1993, Güven bought his first bass guitar. He was one of the first participants in Istanbul Blues Company. He toured and played bass guitar in four songs in their album Kökler. He sang in the opera Aşk İksiri and musical Anlat Şehrazat in 1997. He participated in Fahir Atakoğlu. His voice can be heard on the CD Senfonik Konser. He participated in the Mimi Festival in France with Nekropsi. He composes electronic music with his friend Tolga Enilmez, who is a member of that collective.

In 1997, he became a member of Mor ve Ötesi, replacing Alper Tekin.

In 2008, as a member of Mor ve Ötesi, Güven competed in the Eurovision Song Contest. The band finished seventh with 138 points for their song Deli.

In January 2009, the album Astronot of Ayça Şen was released, produced by Burak Güven.

In 2024, he released a solo album, 18, under the pseudonym Muganni.

== See also ==
- Mor ve Ötesi
- Eurovision Song Contest 2008
