= Beyond the Hill =

- Film poster
- Turkish: Tepenin Ardı
- Directed by: Emin Alper
- Starring: Tamer Levent; Reha Özcan
- Release date: 15 November 2012
- Running time: 94 minutes
- Country: Turkey
- Language: Turkish

Beyond the Hill (Turkish: Tepenin Ardı) is a 2012 Turkish drama film directed by Emin Alper.

== Cast ==
- Tamer Levent as Faik
- Reha Özcan as Nusret
- Mehmet Özgür as Mehmet
- Berk Hakman as Zafer

== Awards ==
=== Winner ===
- Berlin International Film Festival (2012)
- Asia Pacific Screen Award for Best Feature Film (2012)
- Special Jury Prize (Sarajevo Film Festival) (2012)
- International Cinephile Society Awards (2013)
- Karlovy Vary International Film Festival (2012)
- Taipei Film Festival (2012)
- Palic Film Festival (2012)

=== Nominee ===
- Tribeca Film Festival (2012)
- Ghent International Film Festival (2012)
