= Stefan Will =

German film composer (born 1959)

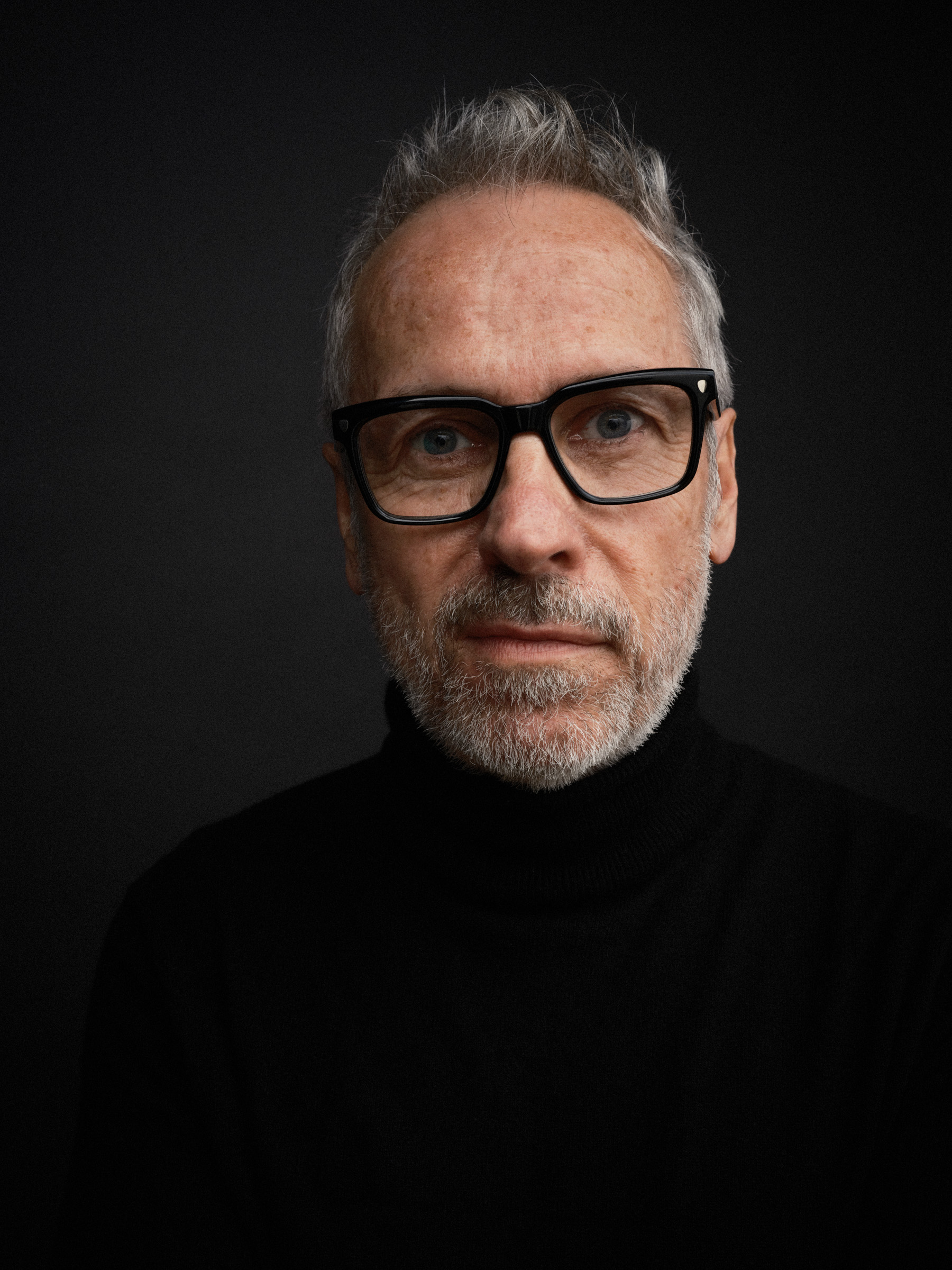
- Born: August 27, 1959 (age 66); Fulda, West Germany

Stefan Will (born 27 August 1959 in Fulda, West Germany) is a German film composer, pianist, and musician known for his collaborations with director Christian Petzold and for his scores for film and television. He has composed music for Phoenix, Transit, 4 Blocks, and Burning Days, and has received German Television Award, the German Music Authors' Prize, and the Golden Orange Award for Best Music.

== Early life and education ==
Will grew up in Fulda and began playing the piano in early childhood. He studied under jazz pianist Bardo Henning and went on to pursue musicology at the University of Hamburg beginning in 1980. He continues to live and work in Hamburg.

== Career ==
In the 1980s and 1990s, He worked as a keyboardist and songwriter, releasing several albums with bands such as Grace Kairos and the Maxim Rad ensemble. During this time, he collaborated with producers including Allen Toussaint and Clive Langer. Between 2008 and 2019, he also contributed to albums by German singer-songwriter Niels Frevert.

Since 1994, Will has focused primarily on film composition. He is best known for his work with director Christian Petzold, scoring nearly all of Petzold's major films, including Die innere Sicherheit (The State I Am In, 2000), Phoenix (2014), and Transit (2018).His music for Die innere Sicherheit accompanied a film that won the German Film Award for Best Feature, and his score for Phoenix was nominated for the German Film Critics' Prize.

Will has also worked extensively with Austrian director Marvin Kren, composing music for the gangster series 4 Blocks (2017), which won the German Television Academy Award for Best Music, as well as for the Netflix series Freud (2020) and Crooks (2024).

His score for Burning Days (Kurak Günler, 2022), a political thriller directed by Turkish filmmaker Emin Alper and screened at the Cannes Film Festival, earned Will multiple awards in Turkey, including the Antalya Golden Orange Film Festival Award, the Turkish Film Critics Association Award, and the Radio Boğaziçi Music Award for Best Film Music.
