= Devrim =

Devrim is the Turkish word for "revolution", and may refer to:

- Devrim (name)
- Devrim (automobile), a Turkish automobile
- Devrim (newspaper), a weekly newspaper in Ankara, Turkey
