= Special Jury Prize =

Special Jury Prize may refer to:

- Special Jury Prize (Karlovy Vary IFF)
- Special Jury Prize (Locarno International Film Festival)
- Special Jury Prize (Sarajevo Film Festival)
- Special Jury Prize (Venice Film Festival)
- Jury Prize (Cannes Film Festival), previously the Special Jury Prize
- IFFI Special Jury Award and Special Mention (International Film Festival of India)
- National Film Award – Special Jury Award (feature film), an Indian film award
