= Deniz Can Aktaş =

Turkish actor (born 1993)

- Born: 28 July 1993 (age 33); Istanbul, Turkey
- Education: Piri Reis University
- Occupation: Actor
- Years active: 2015–present

Deniz Can Aktaş (born 28 July 1993) is a Turkish actor. He is well-known for his role as Halil İbrahim Karasu in the TV series Hudutsuz Sevda (2023–2025) and as Barış Havas in Menajerimi Ara (2020–2021).

== Life and career ==
Aktaş was born in Istanbul. His family is from İnebolu. He is a graduate of Piri Reis University with a degree in ship machinery and management engineering.

Aktaş started his career in 2015 with a role in the TV series Tatlı Küçük Yalancılar adaptation of Pretty Little Liars. In 2016 he played in the high school series Hayat Bazen Tatlıdır. In 2017, he joined the cast of Star TV series Avlu (The Yard), acting alongside Demet Evgar. The series later became available for streaming on Netflix. His portrayal of the character Alp Öztürk in this series was well received by the critics.

In 2019, he was cast in his first leading role in the series Aşk Ağlatır, which was broadcast on Show TV. In 2020, he starred in Menajerimi Ara, an adaptation of the French TV series Call My Agent!.

In 2021, he had his first experience in theater where he played Romeo in a new adaptation of William Shakspeare's classical Romeo and Juliet.

In 2022 he starred in the medical drama series Kasaba Doktoru.

In 2023, he began portraying Halil İbrahim, a character depicted as a modern folk hero seeking justice and revenge, in the television drama Hudutsuz Sevda, with Miray Daner in the female lead role.

In 2026, he began portraying Haydar Ali Aslan, a meticulous close-combat expert defined by his fierce devotion to his loved ones, in the television drama Yeraltı, where Devrim Özkan plays his on-screen love interest, Halide Ceylan. He has been praised for both his acting in this role and for his on-screen chemistry with Özkan.

== Personal life ==
Since 2026, Aktaş has been in a relationship with his Yeraltı series partner Devrim Özkan.

== Filmography ==
Television
Year	Title	Role
2015	Tatlı Küçük Yalancılar	Seçkin
2016–2017	Hayat Bazen Tatlıdır	Burak
2017	Nerdesin Birader	Ali
2018	Avlu	Alp Öztürk
2019	Aşk Ağlatır	Yusuf Eren
2020–2021	Menajerimi Ara	Barış Havas
2022–2023	Kasaba Doktoru	Ömer Özen
2023–2025	Hudutsuz Sevda	Halil İbrahim Karasu
2026	Yeraltı	Haydar Ali Aslan
Films
Year	Title	Role
2022	Bandırma Füze Kulübü	Umut

== Theater ==
Theater
Year	Title	Role
2021	Romeo and Juliet	Romeo
