= Special Jury Prize (Sarajevo Film Festival) =

Special Jury Prize Specijalna nagrada žirija
- Location: Sarajevo
- Country: Bosnia and Herzegovina
- Presented by: Sarajevo Film Festival
- First award: 1995
- Currently held by: What We Ask of a Statue Is that it Doesn't Move by Daphné Hérétakis (2024)
- Website: www.sff.ba

The Special Jury Prize (Sarajevo Film Festival) is an award given at the Sarajevo Film Festival. It is considered the second place award next to the main award, the Heart of Sarajevo. It is awarded in two categories: feature film and documentary film. The Special Jury Prize for feature film is provided by agnès b., long-time partner and friend of Sarajevo Film Festival.

== Award winners ==
=== Feature film ===
Year	Film	Original title	Director(s)	Nationality
2003	Spare parts	Rezervni deli	Damjan Kozole	Slovenia
2004	A Wonderful Night in Split	Ta divna splitska noć	Arsen Anton Ostojić	Croatia
2005	The Kukum	Kukumi	Isa Qosja	Kosovo
2006	Mama i tata	Mama i tata	Faruk Lončarević	Bosnia and Herzegovina
2007	I Am from Titov Veles	Jas sum od Titov Veles	Teona Strugar Mitevska	Macedonia
2008	March	März	Klaus Händl	Austria
2009	Dogtooth	Kynodontas	Yorgos Lanthimos	Greece
2010	Tender Son: The Frankenstein Project	Szelíd teremtés: A Frankenstein-terv	Kornél Mundruczó	Hungary
2011	Avé	Avé	Konstantin Bojanov	Bulgaria
2012	Beyond the Hill	Tepenin Ardı	Emin Alper	Turkey
2013	A Stranger	Obrana i zaštita	Bobo Jelčić	Croatia
2014	Brides	Patardzlebi	Tinatin Kajrishvili	Georgia
2015	Son of Saul	Saul fia	László Nemes	Hungary
2016	Godless	Bezbog	Ralitza Petrova	Bulgaria

=== Documentary film ===
Year	Film	Original title	Director(s)	Nationality
2013	The Cleaners	The Cleaners	Konstantinos Georgousis	Greece
2014	Judgement in Hungary	Judgement in Hungary	Eszter Hajdu	Hungary
2015	Tititá	Tititá	Tamás Almási	Hungary
2016	Scream for me Sarajevo	Scream for me Sarajevo	Tarik Hodžić	Bosnia and Herzegovina
2017	Kinders	Kinders	Arash T. Riahi	Austria
2018	Nine Month War	Kilenc hónap háború	László Csuja	Hungary
2019	Stack of Material	Gomila materijala	Sajra Subašić	Bosnia and Herzegovina
2020	Holy Father	Holy Father	Andrei Dăscălescu	Romania
2021	Atanasija	Atanasija	Boško Krljaš	Bosnia and Herzegovina
2022	Fragile memory	Fragile memory	Igor Ivanko	Ukraine
2023	Fairy Garden	Fairy Garden	Gergö Somogyvári	Hungary
2024	What We Ask of a Statue Is that it Doesn't Move	Afto pou zitame apo ena agalma einai na min kineitai	Daphné Hérétakis	Greece
