= Istanbul Blues Company =

Turkish blues band

Istanbul Blues Company İstanbul Blues Kumpanyası
- Genres: Blues
- Years active: 1993–2000

Istanbul Blues Company (Turkish: İstanbul Blues Kumpanyası; referred as IBC hereafter) was a blues band from Turkey. They are often referred as The Original Turkish Blues Band and bring the blues sound to their national melodies, harvesting both to put together a unique and plausible sound. Despite being short-lived, the band was influential on both the Turkish blues scene and other bands.

== History ==
IBC was founded in October 1993 by Sarp Keskiner and Salih Nazım Peker as Constantinople Blues Company. They were inspired by blues collectives such as John Mayall & the Bluesbreakers and Alexis Korner's Blues Incorporated. Their first album, the thirteen-track Kökler, was released on tape in a batch of 3,000 in October 1996 and on CD in 1997. Keskiner directed, produced, composed, authored, and arranged this album before leaving in 1997. IBC released their second and final album, Sair Zamanlar, in 1999 before embarking on their last tour. The band dissolved in 2000.

In 2022, Bone Union Records released a 1997 recording of IRB playing at the Efes Pilsen Blues Festival.

== Personnel ==
=== Founders ===
- Sarp Keskiner - vocals, guitar, harmonica, mandolin, washtub bass, banjo, foamboard, shaker, spoons, cans, clay bird flutes, tambourine, sticks
- Salih Nazım Peker - vocals, mandolin, banjo, baglama, darbouka

=== Collective ===
- Tuğrul Aray - harmonica, tenor saxophone, saxoflute, pipes, kaval
- İlhan Babaoglu - alto saxophone, bass vocals
- Orçun Baştürk - drums, bells, piano, conga, timbals, vocals, gongs
- Oya Erkaya - bass
- Erke Erokay - electric guitar, acoustic guitar
- Murat Ertel - FX guitar
- Burak Guven - bass
- Vefa Karatay - bass
- Suna Suner - vocals
- Ertan Tekin - zurna, mey, cura mey
- Erdem Tonguc - Farfisa organ, piano

== See also ==
- Music of Turkey
- List of Turkish musicians
