= Burning Days =

2022 Turkish film

- Film poster
- Turkish: Kurak Günler
- Directed by: Emin Alper
- Written by: Emin Alper
- Produced by: Nadir Öperli; Kerem Çatay
- Starring: Selahattin Paşalı; Ekin Koç
- Cinematography: Christos Karamanis
- Edited by: Eytan Ipeker; Özcan Vardar
- Music by: Stefan Will
- Production companies: Ay Yapım; Liman Film
- Distributed by: The Match Factory
- Release date: 23 May 2022 (Cannes)
- Running time: 128 minutes
- Countries: Turkey; France; Germany; Netherlands; Greece; Croatia
- Language: Turkish

Burning Days (Turkish: Kurak Günler) is a Turkish-French drama and mystery thriller film, directed by Emin Alper and released in 2022. A young prosecutor Emre is transferred to a small town in Anatolia Province and encounters an environmental and corruption scandal around the control of water. The film premiered in the Un Certain Regard program at the 2022 Cannes Film Festival, where it was a nominee for the Queer Palm, before premiering in Turkey at the Antalya Golden Orange Film Festival in October 2022.

== Plot ==
=== Part 1 ===
Emre, a young lawyer newly appointed as the state prosecutor, is transferred from Ankara to a small town called Yaniklar in Anatolia Province. In one of the first scenes he witnesses how the town's men are pursuing, eventually shooting and dragging the dead boar which they have chased through the streets and alleys of the village. Emre receives a friendly welcome by the town's lawyer Şahin and the dentist, but makes it clear to them that he cannot identify with what they call a harmless local boar hunting tradition. He reminds them of the gun law and that shooting rifles within areas of human habitation is forbidden.

As Emre swims in a local lake Murat Körükçü, editor of the local newspaper appears with his Harley Davidson motorbike introducing himself. Besides recommending him where it is safe to swim he tells him that Emre's predecessor disappeared without a goodbye; he had suspected that someone was trying to poison him.

At a dinner with the mayor and the mayor s son, which turns out to be the lawyer Şahin, Emre hears the mayor calling the sinkholes a natural phenomenon independent of the water problem. The mayor leaves to attend a problem at the power station, while Şahin encourages Emre to drink more Raki and to take a bath on his roof. All of a sudden the dentist arrives with 2 musicians. Murat enters and comments on the scene. Afterwards they reveal he is the adopted son of the prior mayor. When the two mockingly announce that they have invited a "troupe of ladies" to entertain them Emre says this goes too far. Şahin feels offended by Emre s indignation and an argument ensues. At this moment Pekmez, a young gypsy girl shyly enters and dances. Emre is embarrassed, nauseated, vomits and passes out.

=== Part 2 ===
Emre awakes finding a dead rat in his kitchen. Overnight a new sinkhole has appeared in town and he is called to the hospital. Pekmez has been raped and beaten up, her father Yavuz starts screaming at the police officers who wrestle him down. Erme stares but does not intervene. Yavuz later tells Erme that they have been abused for a long time and always kept silent, and that Pekmez has had a child after her first rape. Erme, the police officer, a male doctor and a fourth man interview Pekmez who merely stammers, that she has broken a glass and her elder sister has beaten her. Emre orders a sperm test and gives orders to arrest Şahin, which the policeman questions. The scene shows numerous women working in the hospital, walking down the hallway, but apparently not involved in this case, highlighting the local patriarchy.

At an outdoor restaurant the judge and her husband, who turns out to be the hospital doctor, meet Erme. The judge opines that Pekmez was "not quite right in her head", suggesting incompetence and Erme counters this could only be confirmed by medical expert opinion. The judge pleads to release Şahin. As mayoral elections approaches Şahin offers free water for the village inhabitants from a tank truck. When Emre interrogates Şahin the latter accuses him of having participated in the rape.

One night Murat arrives at Emre's house to show him geological opinions proving that the sinkholes, are a result of over-drilling for groundwater and that the mayor made them disappear in the water trial. Emre also finds out that Murat heard him crying after the dinner party, that he took him into his house, undressed and put him ito the shower to sober up. Murat suggests Emre was "drugged" at the dinner party. The next day, Emre receives a video on his phone showing him dancing with Murat. Emre is troubled by flash backs.

=== Part 3 ===
Emre orders Kemal to be arrested and receives more pictures showing himself with Şahin from an anonymous number. Emre's memory returns in fragments making him doubt his innocence. Murat offers him an alibi, of having been with him all night. The judge shows Emre newspaper headlines accusing him of stopping the water project. Emre's s authority is also challenged as there are rumours of an illicit affair with Murat. This and the arrest of the lawyer leads to increasing skepticism from the population towards Emre, culminating in a life-threatening situation.

=== Part 4 ===
Emre is confronted with the complex local politics of a small town, where everyone lives according to their own version of the truth. He soon finds himself trapped in a web of corruption, abuse of power and manipulation with ever mounting tension.

== Cast ==
- Selahattin Paşalı as Emre Gündüz, prosecutor
- Selin Yeninci as Judge Zeynep
- Nizam Namidar as Selim Öztürk, mayor and father of Şahin
- Erol Babaoğlu as Şahin Öztürk, lawyer
- Erdem Şenocak as Kemal Gürçay, dentist
- Ekin Koç as Murat Körükçü, editor of the local newspaper
- Eylul Ersoz as Pekmez, Romani girl

== Reception ==
Jonathan Romney described it as "a highly-charged suspenser, a savvy piece of tightly-enclosed world-building and a sharp critique of machismo, populism and their very tangible dangers" and "its country’s most visible filmic export since the heyday of Nuri Bilge Ceylan."

Stephanue Bunbury finds it is an account of the resurgence of homophobia and one Half crime one half Western movie with spectacular cinematography.

Because of its themes (water rights, wasteland motif and moral decay), two film critics have likenened it to a "Turkish Chinatown.

== Controversy ==
In December 2022, well after the film had already premiered both at Cannes and Antalya, the Turkish General Directorate of Cinema demanded repayment of the production funding it had granted to the film. Although they did not officially state a reason for the demand, it was believed to relate to the controversy around the film's LGBTQ+ themes.

== Awards ==
Özcan Vardar and Eytan Ipeker won the European Film Award for Best Editor at the 35th European Film Awards.

The film won nine awards at Antalya Golden Orange Film Festival, including Best Director (Alper), Best Actor (Paşalı), Best Supporting Actor (Babaoğlu), Best Cinematography (Christos Karamanis), Best Music (Stefan Will), Best Editing (Vardar, İpeker), the Turkish Film Critics’ Association Award and the Cahide Sonku Award (Çiğdem Mater).

== Background ==
Central Turkey has an increasing problem of sinkholes forming due to groundwater depletion, as there has been less precipitation.
