= Suskunlar =

- Also known as: Game of Silence
- Screenplay by: Pınar Bulut
- Directed by: M. Çağatay Tosun; Umur Turagay; Çağrı Vila Lostuvalı; Hatice Memiş
- Starring: Murat Yıldırım; Sarp Akkaya; Güven Murat Akpınar; Tugay Mercan; Aslı Enver
- Narrated by: Tugay Mercan
- Theme music composer: Aytekin Ataş
- Country of origin: Turkey
- Original language: Turkish
- No. of seasons: 2
- No. of episodes: 28

Production
- Producer: Timur Savcı
- Cinematography: Yon Thomas
- Camera setup: Single-camera
- Running time: 90 minutes (average)

Original release
- Network: Show TV
- Release: 1 March – 2 December 2012

Suskunlar (English: Game of Silence [original title]), is a Turkish television drama, broadcast on Show TV in 2012. Drama was remade in USA for NBC as Game of Silence; being the first Turkish drama sold to the USA market.

It was aired in over 30 countries and it is based on a true story of children who were sentenced in absentia to nine years in prison on the charge of stealing a baklava car in Gaziantep in 1997.

== Plot ==
Four young boys drive a baklava car without knowing how and accidentally hit and injure an old man. They are tried in their absence and sentenced to several years in prison. In the prison, they endure hard treatment and abuse. As adults, they try to help kids that are still being abused by going to court. But the prison is playing dirty.

== Cast ==
=== Main cast ===
- Murat Yıldırım: Ecevit Oran (Şerif)(Sheriff)
- Sarp Akkaya as Bilal Tutkun (Sarı)(Yellow)
- Güven Murat Akpınar as İbrahim Kene (Iska)(be off target)
- Tugay Mercan as Zeki Sinanlı (Yanık)(Scald)
- Aslı Enver as Ahu Kumral (her unused nickname "Gazelle, Bambi")

=== Cast ===
- Berk Hakman as Gurur Kutay/Gazanfer Bircan(Kasap)(Butcher)
- Reha Özcan as Sait Karam
- Mehmet Özgür as İrfan Alkara (Takoz)(Chock)
- Pelin Akil as Nisan/Nur Ağazade
- Pelin Doğru as Birsen
- Jale Aylanç as Ümran Kene
- Murat Garipağaoğlu as Sermet
- Metin Coşkun as Naim Oran (Belalı Naim/Trouble Naim)
- Fırat Albayram as Hasan (Çakal/Jackal)
- Hakan Gerçek as Hoca (Damat)(Groom)
- Fatih Paşalı as Özcan Tiryaki (Yarasa)(Bat)
- Alican Yücesoy as Cebrail (Gabriel)
- Emir Faruk Uğurcan as Samet (Samet)

=== Children ===
- Furkan Didim as Ecevit (Şerif)
- Emirhan Akbaba as Bilal (Sarı)
- Berkcan Çakar as İbrahim (Iska)
- Ulaşcan Kutlu as Zeki (Yanık)
- Yağmur Esmer as Ahu
- Barış Öner as İrfan (Takoz)
- Mert Çolak as Özcan (Yarasa)
- Efe Akercan as Gazanfer (Kasap)

== International broadcasts ==
Country	Network	Premiere date	Timeslot
North Cyprus	Show TV	1 March 2012	20:00
Afghanistan	1TV	April, 2013	
North Macedonia	Kanal 5	9 April 2013	22:15
Serbia	B92	29 September 2013	19:00; 16:50
Georgia	Maestro	29 November 2013	19:00
Montenegro	TV Vijesti	10 March 2014	19:55
Bosnia and Herzegovina	OBN	22 September 2014	21:00
(Arab League) Arab World	OSN Yahala	3 January 2015	23:00 UAE; 22:00 KSA; 21:00 EGY
United Arab Emirates	Dubai One	7 March 2016	21:00 UAE

== Awards ==
Year	Prize	Category	Recipient	Status
2012	Uludağ Üniversitesi	The Best Turkish Series	Suskunlar	Won
2012	Golden Butterfly Awards	The Best Direction-Suskunlar	Çağatay Tosun	Won
2012	Sosyal Medya Ödülleri	The Best Turkish Series	Suskunlar	Won
2013	Düzce University	The Best Turkish Series	Suskunlar	Won
2013	Antalya Television Awards	The Best Turkish Series	Suskunlar	Nominated
2013	Antalya Television Awards	The Best Music for Series-Suskunlar	Aytekin Gazi Ataş	Nominated
