= Frenzy (2015 film) =

2015 film

- Film poster
- Directed by: Emin Alper
- Written by: Emin Alper
- Starring: Mehmet Özgür; Tülin Özen
- Cinematography: Adam Jandrup; Yavuz Abdülazizoğlu
- Music by: Cevdet Erek
- Release dates: 8 September 2015 (Venice); 6 November 2015 (Turkey)
- Running time: 106 minutes
- Country: Turkey
- Language: Turkish

Frenzy (Turkish: Abluka) is a 2015 Turkish drama film directed by Emin Alper. It was screened in the main competition section of the 72nd Venice International Film Festival where it won the Special Jury Prize. It was screened in the Contemporary World Cinema section of the 2015 Toronto International Film Festival.

== Cast ==
- Mehmet Özgür as Kadir
- Tülin Özen as Meral
- Berkay Ateş as Ahmet
- Müfit Kayacan as Hamza
