= Jale Aylanç =

Turkish actress (1948–2020)

- Born: 23 March 1948; Istanbul, Turkey
- Died: 7 July 2020 (aged 72); Ankara, Turkey
- Occupation: Actress

Jale Aylanç (23 March 1948 – 7 July 2020) was a Turkish stage and film actress.

Aylanç died on 7 July 2020, aged 72. One day later, she was buried at Karşıyaka Cemetery in Ankara.

== Awards ==
- Sanat Kurumu, 1990, Theater Honor Award
- 5th International Ankara Theater Festival, 2000, Honor Award

== Theatre ==
- Yer Demir Gök Bakır : (Yaşar Kemal) - Ankara Sanat Tiyatrosu - 1992
- Ayak Takımı Aarasında : (Maksim Gorki) - Ankara Sanat Tiyatrosu - 1990
- Mefisto : Klaus Mann - Ankara Sanat Tiyatrosu - 1989
- Yusuf ile Menofis : Nâzım Hikmet - Ankara Sanat Tiyatrosu - 1989
- Sonuncular : Maksim Gorki - Ankara Sanat Tiyatrosu - 1987
- Silahşörün Gölgesi : Sean O'Casey - Ankara Sanat Tiyatrosu - 1987
- Bu Zamlar Bana Karşı : Yılmaz Onay - Ankara Sanat Tiyatrosu - 1986
- Nafile Dünya : Oktay Arayıcı - Ankara Sanat Tiyatrosu - 1985
- Bir Ceza Avukatının Anıları : (Faruk Eren) - Ankara Sanat Tiyatrosu - 1984
- Bir Şehnaz Oyun : (Turgut Özakman - Ankara Sanat Tiyatrosu - 1984
- Galile'nin Yaşamı : Bertolt Brecht - Ankara Sanat Tiyatrosu - 1983
- Yaz Misafirleri : Maksim Gorki - Ankara Sanat Tiyatrosu - 1982
- Oyun Nasıl Oynanmalı : Vasıf Öngören - Ankara Sanat Tiyatrosu - 1979
- Tak-Tik : Bertolt Brecht - Ankara Sanat Tiyatrosu - 1978
- Akıllı Hayvanlar : Ahmet Tünel - Ankara Sanat Tiyatrosu - 1977
- Komün Günleri : Bertolt Brecht - Ankara Sanat Tiyatrosu - 1976
- Nereye Payidar : Bilgesu Erenus - Ankara Sanat Tiyatrosu - 1975
- Dimitrof : Hedda Zinner - Ankara Sanat Tiyatrosu - 1974
- Ana: Maksim Gorki - Ankara Sanat Tiyatrosu - 1974
- El Kapısı : Bilgesu Erenus - Ankara Sanat Tiyatrosu - 1972
- Evler Evler : İsmet Küntay - Ankara Sanat Tiyatrosu - 1972

== Films ==
- Dengi Dengine - 2019
- Olur Olur - 2014
- Yeşil Deniz - 2014
- Rüzgarlı Sokak - 2013
- Suskunlar - 2012
- Türkan - 2010
- Gece Sesleri- 2008
- Beni Unutma - 2008
- Nazlı Yarim - 2007
- Hayat Türküsü - 2006
- Fırtına - 2006
- İnsan Kurdu - 1997
- Tersine Akan Nehir - 1996
- Düttürü Dünya - 1988
- Kırlangıç Fırtınası - 1985
