= Devrim (name) =

Devrim is a Turkish name meaning "revolution". Notable people with the name include:

== Given name ==
- Devrim Evin (born 1978), Turkish actor
- Devrim Lingnau (born 1998), German actress
- Devrim Özkan (born 1988), Turkish actress
- Devrim Şahin (born 2007), Turkish footballer
- Devrim Cenk Ulusoy (born 1973), Turkish free-diver
- Devrim Yakut (born 1968), Turkish actress

== Surname ==
- Levent Devrim (born 1969), Turkish football manager and former player
