= Cevdet Erek =

Turkish artist and musician

Cevdet Erek (born 1974) is a Turkish visual artist and musician living and working in Istanbul, Turkey. He is known for combining sound, rhythm and architecture to create installations, videos, objects and performances characterized by site specificity. Cevdet Erek was the recipient of the Nam Jun Paik Award in 2012 and represented Turkey at the 57th International Art Exhibition - La Biennale di Venezia in 2017.

== Education ==
Erek studied architecture at Mimar Sinan University of Fine Arts, while working at various architectural practices as well as acting as the drummer for the music band Nekropsi. He left the master's program he had started at MSU for Istanbul Technical University's Center for Advanced Studies in Music (MIAM), where he studied Sound Engineering and Design and worked as a research assistant from 2002 to 2011. Erek was an artist in residence at Rijksakademie in Amsterdam between 2005 and 2006.

== Works and exhibitions ==
Erek participated in dOCUMENTA (13) curated by Carolyn Christov-Bakargiev in 2012 with "Raum der Rhythmen" [Room of Rhythms], an experiential installation composed of sound, objects architectural elements exploring rhythm, and measurement in our relationship to time and space. Variations of the same installation were shown under the titles "Room of Rhythms - Curva" at MAXXI in Rome as part of the exhibition "Open Museum Open City]” (2014) and “A Room of Rhythms - Otopark” in the 14th Istanbul Biennial (2015). Variations of the “Courtyard Ornamentation” series were shown in 11th Sharjah Biennial (2013), then in the 6th Marrakech Bienniale (2016). "Rulers and Rhythm Studies" which were originally created for "Room of Rhtyhms" were presented in the Stedelijk Museum collection in Amsterdam as well as the 12th Istanbul Biennial (2011) and 7th Asia Pacific Triennial of Contemporary Art in Brisbane, Australia (2022). In 2019 Erek created "Bergama Stereo", an architectural installation with sound, referencing the form and historically attributed functions of the displaced Pergamon Altar. The installation was co-produced by, and exhibited at the 5th Ruhrtriennale (2019), Hamburger Bahnhof (2019) and Staatliche Museen zu Berlin (2020). Iterations of the installation were also shown at Arter, Istanbul (2020) and the Singapore Biennale (2022).

Institutional solo exhibitions of Cevdet Erek's work were organized at the Kunsthalle Basel, Switzerland, in 2012, Spike Island in Bristol, UK, in 2014, MhKA Museum of Contemporary Art, Antwerp and Lydgalleriet, Bergen in 2018.

== Musical career ==
Cevdet Erek has been the drummer of the progressive rock band Nekropsi since the early 1990s. Their first album "Mi Kubbesi" was released in 1996 by Ada Müzik. Together with the band, Erek has released 4 albums and numerous singles and EPS between 1996 and 2020. His first solo album "Davul" was released in 2017 from subtext.

Erek was responsible for the sound and music direction for Kaan Müjdeci's feature-length film “Sivas” which won the Special Jury Prize at the 71st Venice Film Festival (2014) and music and sound co-design (with Cenker Kökten) for Emin Alper's feature-length film “Abluka / Frenzy” which won the Special Jury Prize at the 72nd Venice Film Festival (2015).

Erek designed and realised sound installations for Turkish novelist Orhan Pamuk's Museum of Innocence which was opened in Çukurcuma neighbourhood of Beyoğlu, Istanbul in 2011.

== Publications ==
- "Cevdet Erek - Less Empty Maybe / Az Boş Belki, Ed. Süreyyya Evren, Revolver, 2015
- "Cevdet Erek - Room of Rhythms 1", Verlag der Buchhandlung Walther Konig, 2012
- "SSS - Sahil Sahnesi Sesi / Shore Scene Soundtrack -Themes and Variations for Carpet", Cevdet Erek, Sternberg Press, 2017 (2009)

== Teaching ==
Cevdet Erek co-taught architectural design studio with Arda İnceoğlu at the School of Architecture at Istanbul Technical University between 2011 and 2013 and is an Associate Professor at the Music Technology Department of Istanbul Technical University.
