= Vuslat =

2019 Turkish action television series

- Also known as: Beloved
- Genre: Drama; Action
- Written by: Betül Yağsağan; Aybars Bora Kahyaoglu; Selman Kiliçaslan
- Directed by: Murat Onbul; Baris Yös
- Starring: Kadir Doğulu; Devrim Özkan; Mehmet Özgür; Ümit Kantarcılar; Pelin Uluksar; Gamze Süner Atay
- Theme music composer: Cem Yıldız
- Country of origin: Turkey
- Original language: Turkish
- No. of seasons: 2
- No. of episodes: 44

Production
- Producers: Uğur Veli; Raif İnan
- Production location: Istanbul
- Running time: 130 minutes
- Production company: A23 Medya

Original release
- Network: TRT 1
- Release: 7 January 2019 – 9 March 2020

Vuslat (English title: Beloved) is a Turkish action drama television series starring Kadir Doğulu, Devrim Özkan, Mehmet Özgür, Ümit Kantarcılar, Pelin Uluksar and Gamze Süner Atay. It premiered on TRT 1 on 7 January 2019.

== Plot ==
Aziz Korkmazer is an ambitious, brilliant and good-hearted man who is the sole manager of Korkmazer holding that was founded by his parents. One night Aziz got involved in a crime trying to rescue his foster brother Kerem Saltuk, who was bullied by a thief gang. Unexpectedly a young woman named Feride Caglar witnessed the event and recorded the crime scene from her phone. At the moment Aziz and Feride's world collided, many mysterious things happened to Aziz's life; such as his weird dreams and being attached to Feride's neighborhood, particularly to Salih Koliber/ Salih Baba, the owner of the antique shop, Mr. Nemci, and Mr. Abdullah the madman.

As the series follows, reality unfolds about the past of Feride's mystery neighborhood. Salih Baba also known as Salih Koliber, was a former famous brain surgeon who gave up his career after the failed operation of Aziz's late younger brother Firat, and later opened his antique shop. Another revelation was, the Korkmazer holding has three original partners founded by Mehmet Sefik Korkmazer, Sahkir Caglar, and Aneta Kosvar. And the most shocking truth about Tahsin Korkmazer was that he was the suspect who killed Feride Caglar, Feride's aunt many years ago. Tahsin was madly in love with Feride's mother Suhela, but she chose Faik Caglar the man she truly loves. Unfortunately, Tahsin could not accept Suhela's rejections and tried to shoot Faik, and accidentally it was Feride's aunt who got shot.

Upon learning the truth, the relationship between Aziz and Feride gets complicated. They encountered a lot of struggles, pains, frustrations, hardships, betrayal, and even losing love-ones in their life. Aziz and Feride's love relationship has so many things to consider and to give up. They knew they would face the consequences and sacrifices in any of the decisions they would make. In the end, Aziz and Feride still choose to be happy together and leave everything behind.

== Cast and characters ==
- Kadir Doğulu as Aziz Korkmazer: a brilliant businessman, the sole manager of Korkmazer holding, and son of Tahsin Korkmazer and Perihan Korkmazer. He is the love interest of Feride Cağlar. He is the brother of Sultan Korkmazer and foster brother Kerem Saltuk. He is one of heir apparent of Korkmazer holding.
- Devrim Özkan as Feride Çağlar: a beautiful young designer in a small community in Istanbul, who lives quietly with his father, siblings, and step-mother. She works in a boutique shop to help his father Faik to support their family. She is the love interest of Aziz Korkmazer. After Feride witnesses a crime that Aziz committed, her life changed. She later became a designer of Korkmazer holding when Kerem founds out her family background and talent. She is the only daughter of Faik Cağlar and deceased mother Suhela Cağlar. Her step-mother is Hasibe Cağlar who mistreated her constantly. She is a loving daughter and sister to her siblings, and one of the heir apparent of Korkmazer holding that later revealed by Salih Baba.
- Mehmet Özgür as Salih Koluber/Salih Baba: a mysterious man and owner of the antique shop at Feride's community. He is a former famous brain surgeon and well respected man, who knows the people's past around Feride's neighborhood, and became close friend of Aziz Korkmazer. Later he revealed to Aziz, Feride, and Kerem that Aziz grandfather Mehmet Sefik, gave a task game for the three of them to be fulfilled, before they will inherit the Korkmazer holding.
- Ümit Kantarcılar as Kerem Saltuk: a foster brother of Aziz and Sultan Korkmazer, the grandson of Aneta Kosvar and Bulent Jevhar. He work at Korkmazer holding and works also for Tahsin Korkmazer for his dirty job. He is one of the heir apparent of Korkmazer holding. At the end of the series, he help Yalçin and Yagmur to put Tahsin and Bulent in prison by handing over the evidences he got about them.
- Pelin Uluksar as Nehir Erdem: a childhood friend of Aziz and a family friend of Korkmazer family. She came from a wealthy family but she chooses to work at Korkmazer holding just to get close with Aziz, whom she fell in love since from their childhood.
- Gamze Süner Atay as Hasibe Çağlar: an ambitious, bad-mouthed woman, the second wife of Faik Cağlar and step-mother of Feride. She's the loving mother of Firat, Ceyhan, and Çan, except to Feride. She hates Feride because she is the reflection of her late mother Suhela. She burns the tailor shop of Faik just to get rid of the memory of Suhela and to get money from the insurance company as well. She took blame Meczup Abdullah telling the police that Adullah burned the shop.
- Murat Karasu as Faik Çağlar: a humble man and father of Feride Cağlar who still keep the memory of his deceased wife Suhela in his tailor shop. After his wife died, he marries Hasibe and have three children with her. Even though he was the son of the founder partner of Korkmazer holding, he never demands to the Korkmazer nor he doesn't care about the wealth of his father, he chooses to be poor to forget the dark past of his life.
- Baran Bölükbaşı as Fırat Çağlar: a young handsome man and a member of the thief gang, the half brother of Feride Cağlar. He became one of Kerem's trusted men to work for his illegal jobs. He became close friend and driver of Sultan Korkmazer. He later killed Tahsin Korkmazer when they are both in prison to avenge her sister Feride when Tahsin tried to murder Feride.
- Serra Pirinç as Ceyhan Çağlar: half-sister of Feride, and second child of Faik and Hasibe Cağlar. Kerem pays her to pretend to be his lover to provoke Aziz's family and Feride's family as well. She disappeared in the series during Season 2.
- Erdem Akakçe as Meczup Abdullah: a madman at Feride's neighborhood who wanders everywhere and used to stay at Salih Baba's antique shop. He plays an important role in the series for Aziz, Feride and Kerem to fulfill the task game that was given by Mehmet Sefik Korkmazer, the grandfather of Aziz.
- Osman Alkaş as Tahsin Korkmazer: father of Aziz and Sultan Korkmazer, and husband of Perihan Korkmazer. He is an ambitious, greedy and shrewd businessman. Later revealed that he was in love with Suhela, the deceased wife of Faik Cağlar, when they were young and he accidentally murdered Feride's aunt, the sister of Faik.
- Gözde Kaya as Sultan Korkmazer: a beautiful, young, and sweet sister of Aziz Kokmazer. She is loved by her family particularly by her brothers Aziz and Kerem. She was involved in a car accident together with Firat and Yalçin, an accident plotted by Tahsin Korkmazer for Yalçin.
- Nurhan Özenen as Perihan Korkmazer: a high-profiled woman, the wife of Tahsin Korkmazer, mother of Aziz and Sultan Korkmazer. She planned to poisoned Feride Cağlar during the fashion show of Korkmazer holding in order to prevent the wedding of her son to Feride. Unfortunately both Feride and Aziz were poisoned, provoking Perihan's suicide.
- Özcan Varaylı as Çakal Necmi: a mysterious man who lives at Feride's neighborhood who owns a tea shop. He is one that Mehmet Sefik entrusted the task game for Aziz, Feride and Kerem. Later revealed that his family was murdered by Bulent Jevher.
- Mert Karabulut as Yalçın Kaya: a dedicated police officer, Feride's childhood friend and uncle of Emine Dilbaz. He became obsessed to Aziz and Tahsin Korkmazer to put them in prison and reveal the illegal jobs and crime of the family. Later he became friend of Aziz after learning he was not involved in his father's misdeeds.
- Şeyla Halis as Sevim Dilbaz: an industrious woman and mother of Emine Dibaz who lives at Feride's community. She helps and cares for anyone in their neighborhood.
- Başak Kaya as Emine Dilbaz: best friend of Feride Caglar who became the love interest of Altan Öztürk and supportive to Feride and Aziz's relationship.
- Veysel Diker as Süleyman Dilbaz: a kind and supportive man, husband of Sevim, and father of Emine Dilbaz.
- Hikmet Körmükçü as Madam Aneta Kosvar: a generous, rich old woman at Feride's community. She is the grandmother of Kerem Saltuk, who is one of the original founder of Korkmazer holding. Her husband Bulent Jevher trick her and abandoned her after he consumed all her wealth.
- Sennur Nogaylar as Gülten Şahin: a head maid servant of Korkmazer family and best friend of Alice mother of Kerem Saltuk. She loves and took care of Korkmazer's siblings and Kerem Saltuk like her own children.
- Barış Kışlak as Altan Öztürk: best friend of Aziz Korkmazer who is an orphan and became Aziz buddy after they graduated in military school. He is the love interest of Emine Dilbaz, best friend of Feride.
- Mehmet Emin Kadıhan as Tekin Sarp Gönenç: an orphan who lives in Feride's neighborhood and work at Necmi's tea shop. He is the messenger of Salih Baba and Necmi.
- Doğukan Töngel as Alamet Ahmet: an young orphan and musically talented man who became a friend of Sultan Korkmazer. He works at Necmi tea shop and is a friend of Tekin.
- Elif Özkul as Sevda Şahin: daughter of Gülten Sahin and a friend of Sultan Korkmazer.
- İpek Muştu as Berrin Şanslı: a maid servant of Korkmazer family.
- Ali İhsan Çiçek as Faruk Şahin: husband of Gülten Sahin and father of Sevda Sahin, the family driver of Korkmazer.
- Mehmet Halil Çelik as Can Çağlar: the youngest son of Faik and Hasibe Cağlar, and the half brother of Feride. He used to run away from home whenever his parents fought.
- Yavuz Sepetçi as Bulent Jevher: grandfather of Kerem Saltuk and husband of Aneta Kosvar. He appeared in nine episodes of the series in Season 2. He is the leader of the business gang that Tahsin Korkmazer works together for many years secretly. He is a selfish, greedy, and manipulative man that he gained his wealth and power by marrying a rich woman, Aneta Kosvar.
- Semra Dinçer as Alice: mother of Kerem Saltuk, daughter of Aneta Kosvar and Bulent Jevher. She was ruthlessly abused by her father Bulent, after her father learned that she married a poor young man who works for his father's dirty job. After the incident one of Bulent's business partners hides her in Germany at a mental institution.
- Filiz Taçbas as Zehra: an intelligent woman who used to live at Feride's community. She appeared in Season 2 in the series, she came from Germany and decided to go back home in Istanbul to seek justice of his deceased husband who was murdered long ago. She helps and support Feride to open her own boutique when Feride resigned at Korkmazer holding. She revealed to Feride that her grandfather left her an inheritance, and that was the old house of Cağlar family. She also helps Kerem hide his mother Alice and grandmother Aneta from Bulent's cruelty.
- Ergul Miray Sahin as Yagmur: a childhood friend of Feride, Yalçin and Emine, the daughter of Zehra and a police officer. She came back to Istanbul to investigate the case of his late father that still unsolved many years ago. She became a mutual friend of Kerem Saltuk who helps her find the murderer of her father.
