= Reha Özcan =

Turkish actor

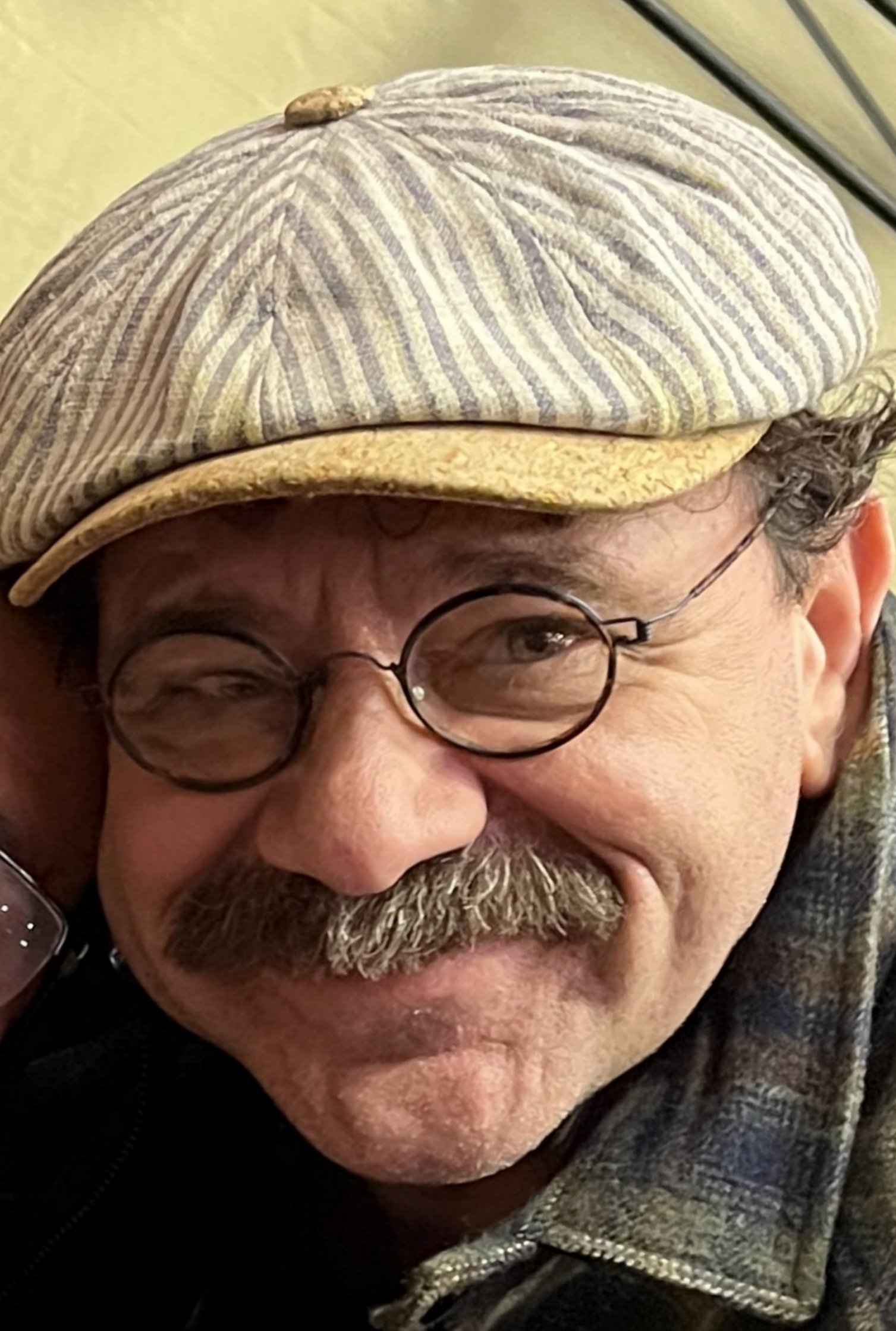
- Born: Ragıp Reha Özcan; 5 July 1965 (age 60); Bingöl, Turkey
- Occupation: Actor
- Years active: 1985–present
- Known for: Bizim Hikaye
- Children: 2

Ragıp Reha Özcan (born 5 July 1965) is a Turkish actor. He is best known for his role Fikri Elibol in the TV series Bizim Hikaye.

== Life and career ==
Ragıp Reha Özcan was born on 5 July 1965 in Bingöl, Turkey. He has a brother Serhat Özcan, also an actor. He graduated from Mimar Sinan Fine Arts University in 1987. He started working in the Trabzon State Theater in the same year. He was appointed to the Istanbul State Theater in the 1990–1991.

He settled in Antalya during the 1992–1993 theatre season and took part in the Antalya State Theater. He also worked as a director in the Akdeniz University Theater Club and Antalya Metropolitan Municipality Theater, and was appointed to the Istanbul State Theater in the 2010–2011 season.

He has appeared in a lot of series, movies and theater plays. He had his first role in a theater play in 1985. He played hit series Suskunlar which the first Turkish drama sold to the USA market for remake. His most famous series were Maral, where he depicted the character of Halis in 2014–2015. In 2017, he depicted the character of Fikri Elibol in the series Bizim Hikaye, which was broadcast on FOX. He played the role of Adil Erinç in the romantic medical drama series Mucize Doktor. In 2016, Reha Özcan ended his 29-year career as a theater actor. In addition to acting, he can also be seen on television. Ragıp is married and has two children.

== Filmography ==
=== Television ===
- Üç Kız Kardeş 2022 - Sadık Kalender
- Mucize Doktor 2019–2021 - Prof. Dr. Adil Erdinç
- Bizim Hikaye: Serdar Gözelekli, Koray Kerimoğlu - 2017–2019 - Fikri Elibol
- Yaşamak Güzel Şey : Müfit Can Saçıntı - 2017
- Adı Efsane: Devrim Yalçın - 2017 - Hasan
- Sen Benim Herşeyimsin: Tolga Örnek - 2016
- Gecenin Kraliçesi: Durul Taylan & Yağmur Taylan - 2016 - Baba Osman
- Maral: En Güzel Hikayem: Bahadır İnce - 2015 - Halis Feyman
- Öyle ya da Böyle: Alper Kaya - 2015
- Karadayı: Uluç Bayraktar - 2014 - Vehbi Duru
- Unutursam Fısılda: Çağan Irmak - 2014
- Buna Değer: Can Oral - 2014
- Muhteşem Yüzyıl: Yağız Alp Akaydın, Mert Baykal - 2014
- Fatih: Merve Girgin, Faruk Teber - 2013
- Ölü ya da Diri: Jorgo Papavassiliou - 2013
- Suskunlar: Umur Turagay - 2012 - Sait Karam
- Tepenin Ardı: Emin Alper - 2012
- Kurtlar Vadisi Pusu: Onur Tan - 2011 - Jozef Beile
- Yangın Var: Murat Saraçoğlu - 2011 - Emniyet Müdürü
- Üsküdar'a Giderken: Selçuk Aydemir - 2011 - Berber Bürge
- IV. Osman: Semra Dündar - 2009 - Commissioner Osman Toprak
- Bahtı Kara: Theron Patterson - 2008 - Adnan
- Dağlar Delisi: Taner Akvardar - 2007 - Porsuk

=== Film ===
- Uzun Zaman Önce (Salih, 2019)
- Aydede (Necati, 2018)
- 8 (Sekiz) (2018)
- Poyraz Karayel: Küresel Sermaye (Amir Yıldız, 2017)
- Yaşamak Güzel Şey (2017)
- İstanbul Kırmızısı (2016)
- Sen Benim Herşeyimsin (2016)
- Öyle ya da Böyle (Sadık, 2015)
- Çare-Sizlik (Hakim, 2014)
- Unutursam Fısılda (2014)
- Buna Değer (2014)
- Ölü ya da Diri (2013)
- Kor (Short film, 2013)
- Tepenin Ardı (Nusret, 2012)
- Yangın Var (2011)
- Buhar (Short film, 2011)
- Bahtı Kara (Adnan, 2008)
