= Devrim Özkan =

Turkish actress

- Born: 2 September 1998 (age 28); Muğla, Turkey
- Education: Muğla Sıtkı Koçman University
- Occupation: Actress
- Years active: 2017–present

Devrim Özkan (born 2 September 1998) is a Turkish television and stage actress.

== Life and career ==
Özkan was born in Muğla on 2 September 1998 and grew up in Milas and Bodrum. While studying at Muğla Sıtkı Koçman University's School of Fine Arts, she dropped out at the end of her freshman year and moved to Istanbul, where she began her acting career with her first role in the TV series Rüya.

She joined the cast of historical series such as Vatanım Sensin and Mevlânâ Celâleddîn-i Rûmî. She later appeared in the TV series Ramo. She played her first leading role in the TV series Vuslat for two seasons. She later gained widespread recognition by portraying the character of Songül Acarerk in the TV series Gelsin Hayat Bildiği Gibi. Later on, she portrayed the character of Fidan Hersekli in the TV series Ne Gemiler Yaktım. Since 2026, she has been portraying the character of Halide Ceylan as the female lead on Yeralti. She's been praised for both her acting in this role and for her on-screen chemistry with Deniz Can Aktas.

== Personal life ==
Between 2023 and 2025, Özkan was in a relationship with footballer Lucas Torreira.

Since 2026, Özkan has been in a relationship with her Yeraltı series partner Deniz Can Aktaş.

== Filmography ==
Television
Year	Title	Role	Notes	Network
2017	Rüya	İpek Giray	Supporting role	Show TV
2017–2018	Vatanım Sensin	Havva	Supporting role	Kanal D
2019–2020	Vuslat	Feride Çağlar	Leading role	TRT 1
2020–2021	Ramo	Nehir Hanlı	Supporting role	Show TV
2022–2023	Gelsin Hayat Bildiği Gibi	Songül Acarerk Payaslı	Leading role	Show TV
2023–2024	Ne Gemiler Yaktım	Fidan Hersekli	Leading role	Show TV
2025	Çift Kişilik Oda	Nilüfer Yücel	Leading role	NOW
2026	Yeraltı	Halide Ceylan	Leading role	NOW
Streaming series and movies
Year	Title	Role	Notes	Platform
2021	Ex Aşkım	Selin	Supporting role	GAİN
2023–2025	Mevlânâ Celâleddîn-i Rûmî	Efsun Hatun	Leading role	tabii
2024	Mavi Mağara	Alara	Leading role	Amazon Prime
TBD	Her Şey Yolunda	Leyla	Leading role	Amazon Prime
TBD	P.A.Y.		Leading role	tabii

== Theatre ==
Year	Title	Venue	Notes
2019	Woyzeck Açısı	Kozyatağı Cultural Center	

== Awards and nominations ==
Year	Award	Category	Work	Result
2020	International İzmir Film Festival	Best Actress (TV Series)	Vuslat	Nominated
2022	Moon Life Awards	Action Romantic Series Actress of the Year	Gelsin Hayat Bildiği Gibi	Won
2022	48th Golden Butterfly Awards	Best Actress	Gelsin Hayat Bildiği Gibi	Nominated
2026	Üniversite Ödülleri	Actress of the Year	Yeraltı	Nominated
