= Piri Reis University =

Private university in Istanbul, Turkey

Coordinates: 40°49′34″N 29°19′20″E

- Piri Reis Üniversitesi
- Type: Private
- Established: 8 February 2008
- President: Prof. Dr. Nafiz Arıca
- Location: Istanbul, Turkey
- Campus: Rural
- Founder: Turkish Maritime Education Foundation (TÜDEV)
- Website: www.pirireis.edu.tr

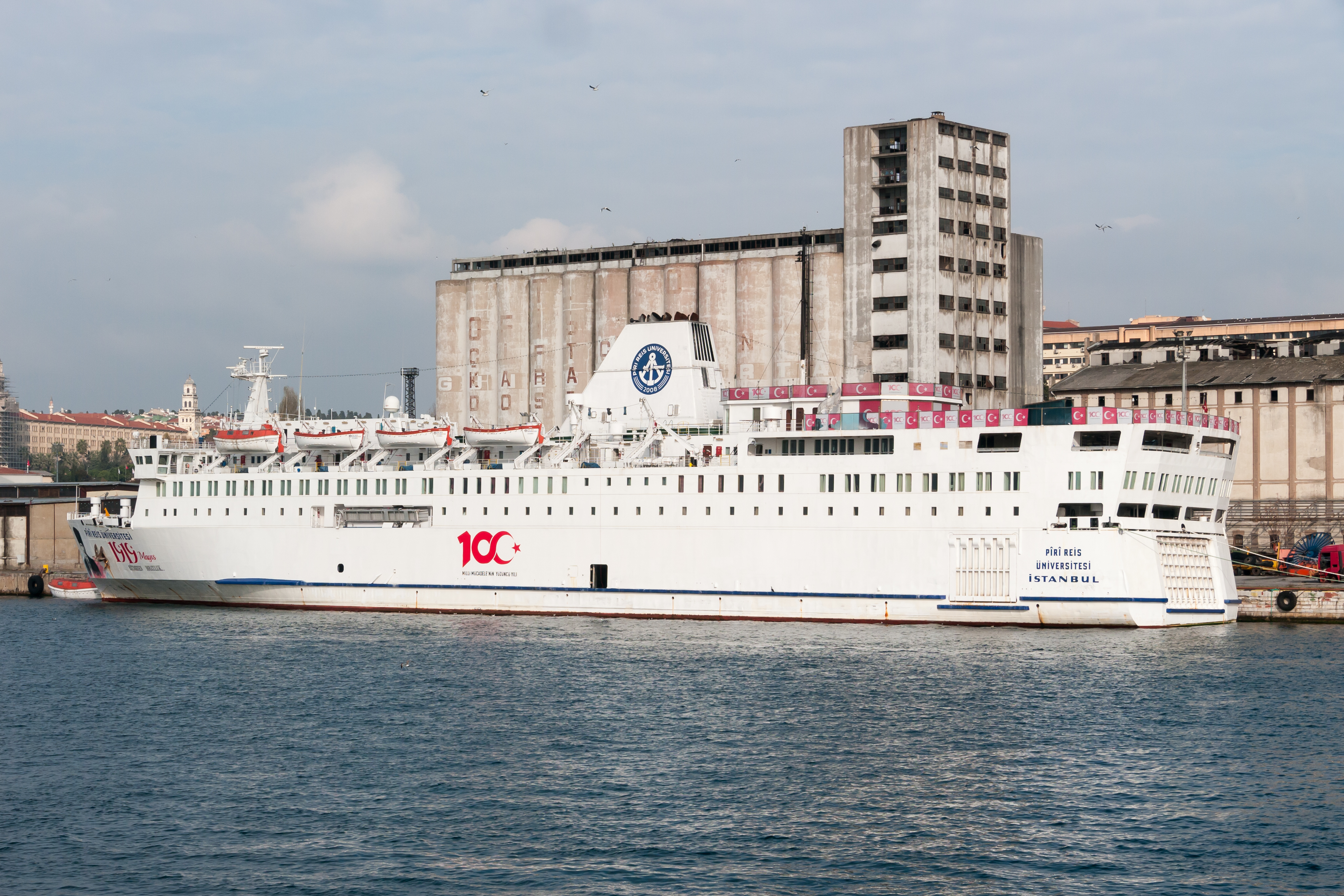
Piri Reis Universitesi

Piri Reis University (Turkish: Piri Reis Üniversitesi) (common usage: Piri Reis Maritime University) is a private university founded by the Turkish Maritime Education Foundation in 2008 in Istanbul, Turkey. Named after the Turkish admiral and cartographer Piri Reis (ca. 1470–1554), it is devoted to the education of maritime studies.

== Admission to university ==
In order to enter the Faculty of Maritime Studies at the university, which accepts students according to the MF4 score type of LYS, it is compulsory to obtain a Seafarer's Health Certificate. Apart from this, students entering the Faculty of Maritime Studies must also pass the physical competence and oral interview stages.

== Faculties ==
The university consists of four faculties and two institutes.

- Faculty of Science and Letters
- Faculty of Economics and Business Administration
- Faculty of Engineering
- Faculty of Maritime
- Institute of Science
- Institute of Social Sciences
