= Berk Hakman =

Turkish film and television actor.He (born 1981)

- Born: 14 August 1981 (age 43); Ankara, Turkey
- Education: Mimar Sinan University State Conservatory
- Occupation: Actor
- Years active: 2003–present

Berk Hakman (born 14 August 1981) is a Turkish theater, film and television actor. He is also a musician and photographer. He is known for the award-winning film Tepenin Ardı, the period series Hatırla Sevgili, and the series Suskunlar which is the first Turkish drama sold to the USA market for remake. He composed the song "Texas".

== Biography ==
He was born in Ankara, Turkey to a family with roots in Sarajevo, Bosnia. His father is Ataman Hakman, a dentist and musician from Erkin Koray's Underground Quartet. Hakman has played the guitar since he was 11 years old. In high school he played keyboard instruments, trumpets and bass guitars. He went to Antalya in 1999 to study Tourism Management at Akdeniz University, just after the 1999 İzmit earthquake, and continued for two years. There, he entered the theater club. He then graduated from the acting department of the State Conservatory of the Mimar Sinan University in Istanbul. He started his film career with Okul which was shot in 2003. In the series Suskunlar, he played a police who cannot feel pain, heat, cold and is an ex-convict.

== Filmography ==
Cinema
Year	Title	Role	Note
2003	Okul	Ersin	
2006	Janjan	Janjan - Sadık Karayel	
2006	Saklı Yüzler	İsmail	
2009	Kampüste Çıplak Ayaklar	Ali	Guest
2012	Tepenin Ardı	Zafer	
2017	Taksim Hold'em	Fuat	
2024	Edge of Night	Kenan	
Web series
Year	Title	Role	Note
2021	Olağan Şüpheliler	Yalçın	
2023	Kuzgun: Dipsiz Karanlık	Mehmet Kuzgun	
Television
Year	Title	Role	Note
2005	Kırık Kanatlar	Hristo	
2005	Seher Vakti	Davut	
2006	Felek Ne Demek?	Şeyda	
2006–2007	Hatırla Sevgili	Deniz Karayel	
2009	Çocukluk Günleri		
2008–2009	ES-ES	Tercan	
2011	Mazi Kalbimde Yaradır	Selim Balkanlı	
2012	Suskunlar	Gurur Kutay / Gazanfer Bircan	
2013–2015	Kaçak	Ertan Demir	
2016	Hayatımın Aşkı	Kaan Engindeniz	
2017–2018	Siyah İnci	Vural Demiroglu	
2022	Duy Beni	Selim Bender	
2023	Ne Gemiler Yaktım	Rutkay Sezai	Leading role

== منابع ==
- بیوگرافی برک هاکمان
- Berk Hakman at IMDb
