= Mehmet Özgür =

Turkish actor

- Born: 30 August 1970 (age 56); Korkuteli, Antalya, Turkey
- Occupation: Actor
- Years active: 1993–present

Mehmet Özgür (born 30 August 1970) is a Turkish actor. He is the general art director of the Antalya Metropolitan Municipality Theatre.

Özgür, who graduated from the Theatre Department of Istanbul University, started his career in art in 1988 with the theatre event he attended during a language course in Antalya. The following year, he focused on theatre works in Antalya Halkevi. In 1993, he started working for Antalya State Theatre and made his television debut in 2004. His breakthrough came with his role as "Takoz İrfan" in the TV series Suskunlar which was the first Turkish drama sold to the USA market for remake. Afterwards, he was cast in a number of popular series, including Muhteşem Yüzyıl, Çalıkuşu, Filinta and Vuslat.

Aside from his career in cinema and television, Özgür has continued to work on stage as both an actor and a director.

== Filmography ==
- Anonim, 2024
- Çırak, 2024, "Usta"
- Bir Cumhuriyet Şarkısı, 2024
- Hay Sultan, 2023–, "Abdülkâdir Geylânî"
- Arak/Kara, 2023–2024, "Rauf Çınar"
- Ölümlü Dünya 2, 2023, "İlhami"
- Müjdemi İsterim, 2022
- Alparslan: Büyük Selçuklu, 2021–2023, "Nizam al-Mulk"
- Hay Sultan, 2021, "Abdul Qadir Gilani"
- Uyanış: Büyük Selçuklu, 2020–, "Nizam al-Mulk"
- Jet Sosyete, 2020, "Polat Sakinoğlu" (guest appearance)
- Ya İstiklal Ya Ölüm, 2020, "Mehmet Akif Ersoy"
- Cinayet Süsü, 2019
- Vuslat, 2019–2020, "Salih Koluber - Salih Baba"
- Ölümlü Dünya, 2018, "İlhami"
- Söz, 2017–2018, "Agah (Hamit Karasu)"
- Masum, 2017, "Selahattin"
- İçimdeki Fırtına, 2017
- Hanım Köylü, 2016, "Düzgün Ağa"
- 125 Years Memory, 2015, "Âli Bey"
- Abluka, 2015, "Kadir"
- En Güzeli, 2015
- Filinta, 2015, "Gıyaseddin Hatemi"
- Ekisporter, 2015
- Tut Sözünü, 2015, "Tokyolu"
- Çalıkuşu, 2013, "Seyfettin"
- Muhteşem Yüzyıl, 2013, "Lütfi Pasha"
- Bana Bir Soygun Yaz, 2012, "Hacamat"
- Suskunlar, 2012, "Takoz İrfan"
- Tepenin Ardı, 2012, "Mehmet"
- Mevsim Çiçek Açtı, 2012
- Hop Dedik: Deli Dumrul, 2011
- Kollama, 2008–2011, "Necip Yılmaz"
- IV. Osman, 2009, "Necip Yılmaz"
- Kendi Okulumuza Doğru, 2008
- Sözün Bittiği Yer, 2007, "Turgut"
- Kelebek, 2007
- Memleket Hikayeleri - Mican, 2006
- Haylaz Babam, 2005, "Kerem"
- Çözde Al Mustafa Ali, 2005, "Mustafa Ali"
- Tarçın Konuştu, 2004, "Kerem"

== Theatre ==
=== As actor ===
- Kanlı Nigar
- Nalınlar
- Lozan
- Köşe Kapmaca
- Düğün ya da Davul
- The Miser
- Derya Gülü
- Becerikli Kanguru
- Aşk Grevi
- Töre
- Rumuz Goncagül
- Sığıntılar
- Vatan Kurtaran Şaban
- Fehim Paşa Konağı

=== As director ===
- Sevdalı Bulut
- Benim Güzel Pabuçlarım
- Definename
- Ali Ayşe’yi Seviyo
- Boyacı
- Ah Şu Gençler
- Kadınlar Ih Derse
