= Nekropsi =

Turkish band

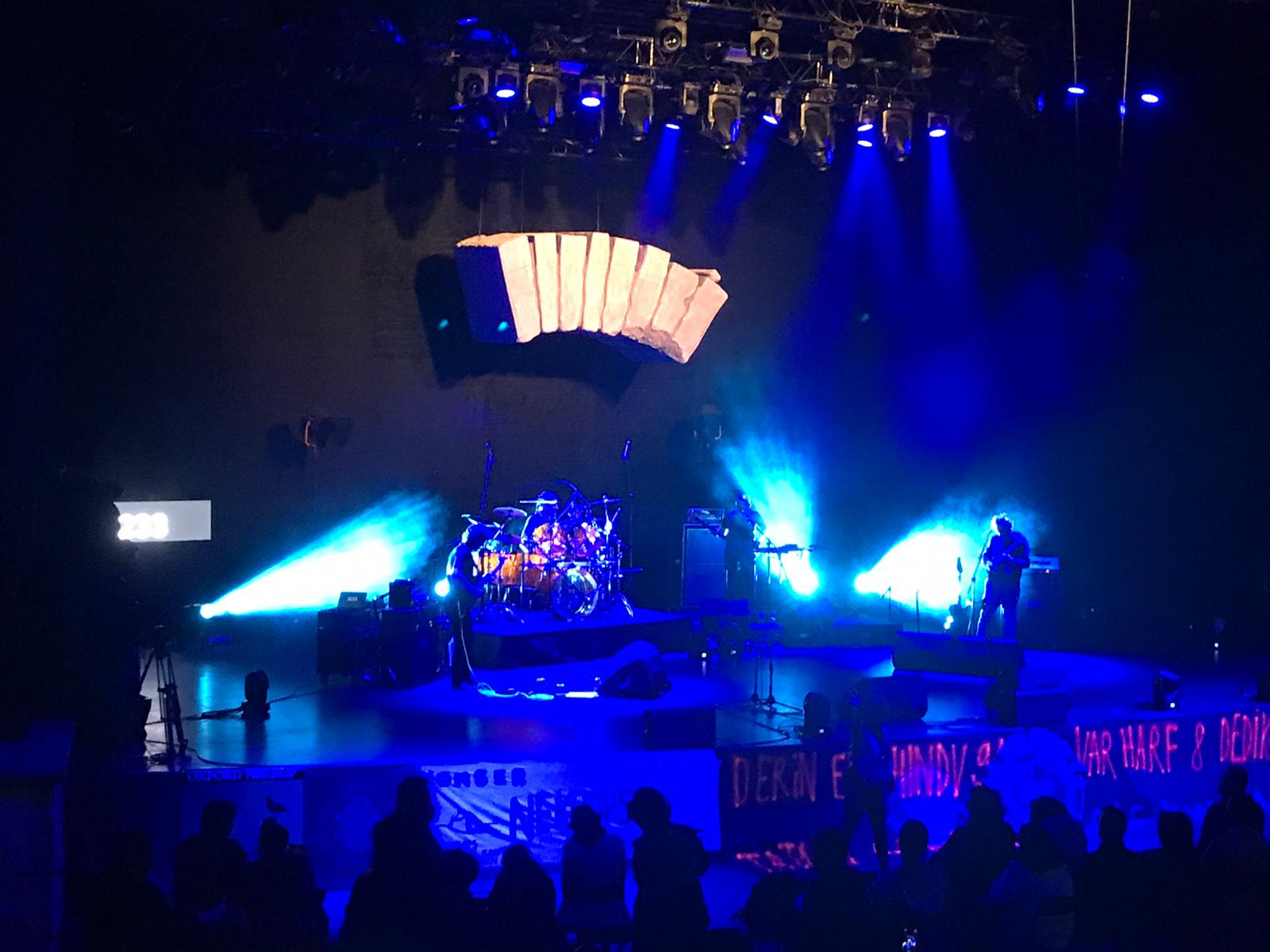

Background information
- Also known as: Necropsy
- Origin: Istanbul, Turkey
- Genres: Avant-garde; experimental; electronic; psychedelic rock; progressive rock; noise rock; thrash metal (early)
- Years active: 1989–present
- Labels: Ada Müzik, Peyote Müzik
- Members: Cem Ömeroglu; Cevdet Erek; Kerem Tüzün; Gökhan Gorali
- Past members: Tolga Yenilmez; Patrick Chartol; Mehmet Fırıl; Cenk Turanlı; Umut Gürbüz
- Website: www.nekropsi.net

Nekropsi (founded in 1989 as "Necropsy") is a musical group from Istanbul, Turkey. After the release of their four track thrash metal demo Speed Lessons Part I in 1992, their sound has evolved into a new hybrid and become eclectic with the release of the first full-length album Mi Kubbesi, making their music difficult to categorize, fusing elements from genres such as progressive rock, thrash metal, electronica and noise. Following a ten-year hiatus, they released their second full-length album Sayı 2: 10 Yılda Bir Çıkar. Mi Kubbesi was re-released as 1998 by Peyote Müzik in 2010.

== Discography ==
=== Albums ===
- Mi Kubbesi – Ada Müzik, 1996
- Sayı 2: 10 Yılda Bir Çıkar – A.K. Müzik, 2007
- 1998 – Peyote Müzik, 2010
- Aylık/Monthly – (digital), bandcamp 2013 * (CD), A.K. Müzik 2014

=== Singles ===
- Ta Ta Du - (digital), bandcamp 2018
- Sekizler - (digital), bandcamp 2018

=== Compilations ===
- Sular Yükseliyor – Ada Müzik, 1996

=== Other releases ===
- Speed Lessons Part 1 – Demo, 1992

== Live appearances ==
- 2001 – Nekropsi, Les Enfants des autres – Institut français d'Istanbul, Turkey
- 1998 – Jimmy Page & Robert Plant, Nekropsi – Istanbul, Turkey

== Personnel ==
=== Current ===
- Cem Ömeroğlu – Guitars, Vocals
- Cevdet Erek – Drums, Vocals
- Kerem Tüzün – Bass, Vocals
- Gökhan Goralı – Guitars

=== Former ===
- Tolga Yenilmez – Guitars, Vocals
- Patrick Chartol – Bass (1998–2001)
- Mehmet Fırıl – Bass (1998)
- Cenk Turanlı – Bass (1994–1998)
- Umut Gürbüz – Bass (1991–1993)
