= Emin Alper =

Turkish filmmaker and historian (born 1974)

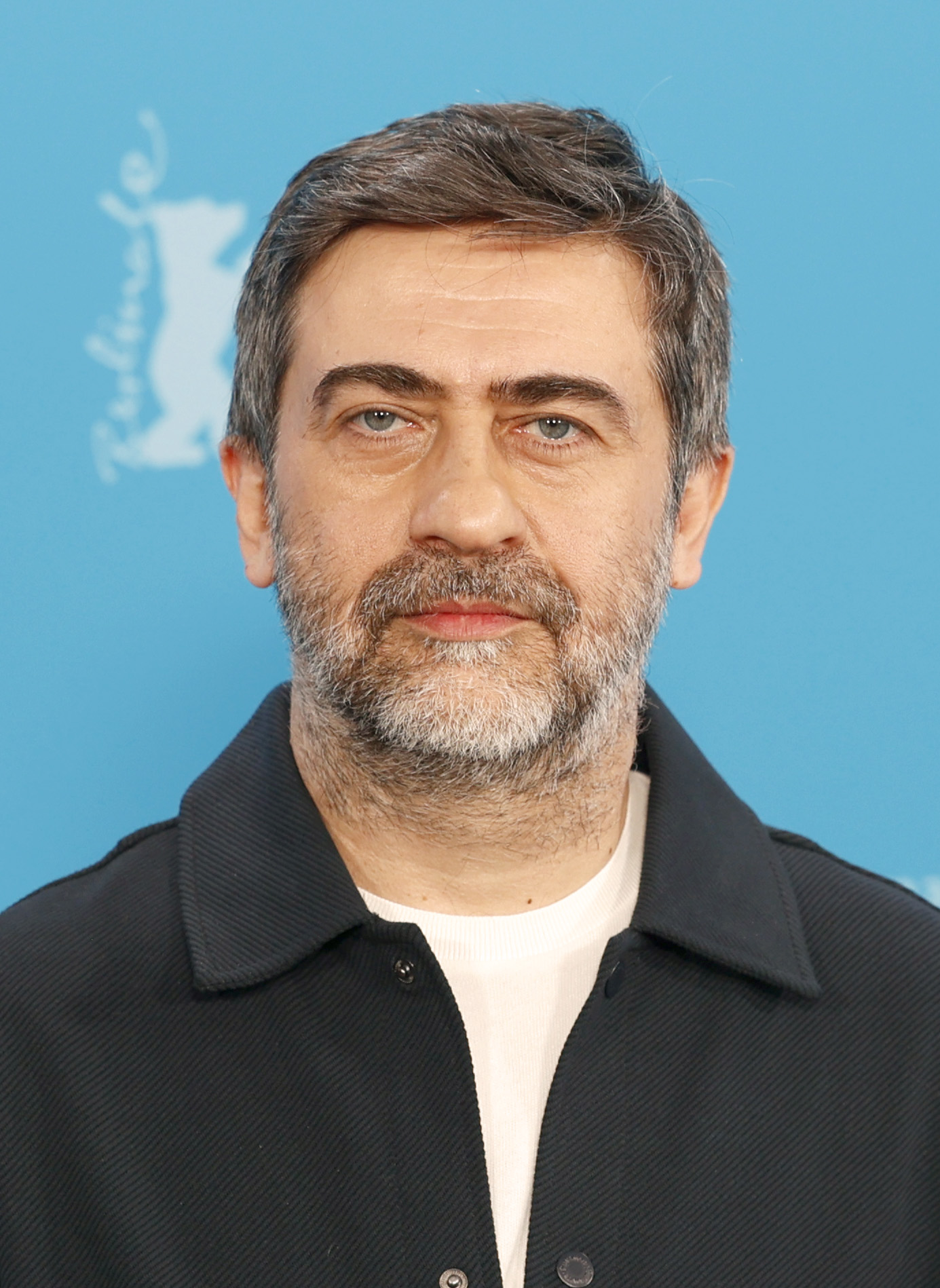
- Alper in 2026
- Born: August 13, 1974 (age 52); Ermenek, Karaman Province, Turkey
- Education: Boğaziçi University
- Occupations: Film director, screenwriter, film producer, academic
- Years active: 2005 - present
- Employer: Istanbul Technical University

Emin Alper (born 13 August 1974, Karaman) is a Turkish filmmaker and historian. Most known for Beyond the Hill (2012), Frenzy (2015) and Burning Days (2022). For Salvation (2026), he won the Silver Bear Grand Jury Prize.

== Life ==
During his university years, Emin Alper was an active member of the cinema club at Boğaziçi University, spending most of his time with friends thinking on and discussing about cinema. They would organize seminars with the prominent filmmakers of their time, Nuri Bilge Ceylan and Zeki Demirkubuz. He began writing scripts and film reviews. Together with his friends, he published the film magazine “Görüntü.” It was during his university years that his lifelong love for cinema shaped, persuading him to pursue filmmaking as a career.

After graduating from the university with a degree in Economics, Alper furthered his Academic work, receiving his PhD in Modern Turkish History. Emin Alper subsequently began teaching at the Department of Social Science at Istanbul Technical University. He wrote on cinema and politics at several magazines including Tarih ve Toplum, Birikim, Mesele and Altyazı.

== Career ==
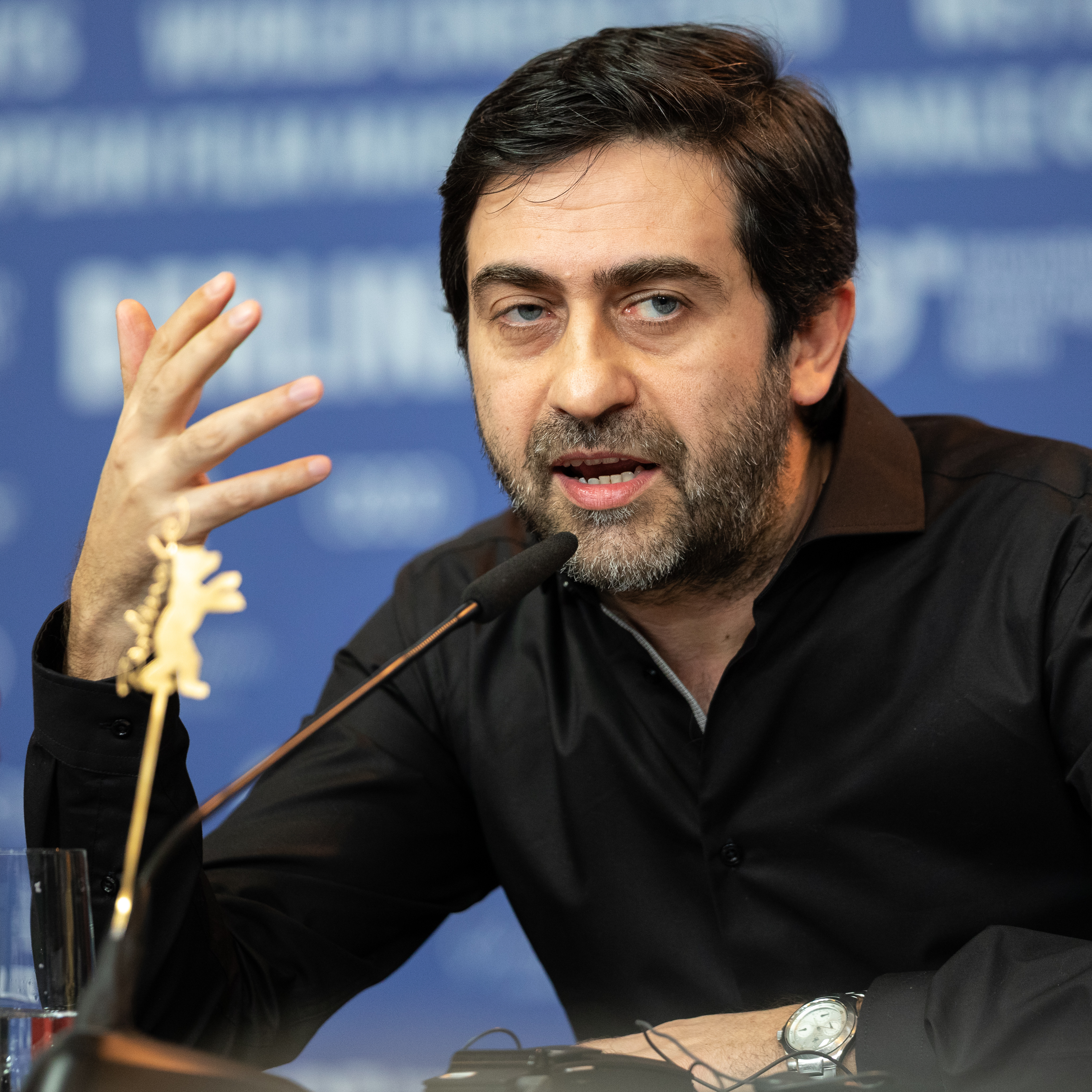
Alper in 2019

Gaining experience from watching other filmmakers and taking role in their short films, Emin Alper went on to make his first independent short films, The Letter in 2005, and Rıfat in 2006; the latter won Best Short Film at the Bucharest International Film Festival (2008) and the Special Audience Award at the !F Istanbul International Film Festival.

His breakthrough came in 2012, with his directorial debut, Beyond the Hill, “about the repressed violence and projections of a Turkish family on holiday". The film won the Caligari Film Prize in the 62nd Berlinale and Best Film at the Asia Pacific Screen Awards.

His second feature film, Frenzy (2014), won the Special Jury Prize at the 72nd Venice International Film Festival. The film is a psycho-social drama/thriller about a society“ brought to heel by its fear of terrorism” in which two brothers — one a paroled convict secretly recruited to ferret out terrorists by examining the contents of trash bins, the other hired to kill stray dogs — are sucked into a whirl of state-sponsored distrust. Frenzy was profoundly timely in its subject matter, loudly echoing the current turmoil of politics in Turkey and the Middle East. Alper says of Frenzy, ‘It shows how the political system turns “little men” into the cogs of its violent mechanism by providing them with authority and the instruments of violence, which in the end turn against them and lead to their destruction.’ The film won the Jury Grand Prize at the 9th Asia Pacific Screen Awards.

Both Beyond the Hill and Frenzy were chosen as the Best Turkish Film by the Turkish Critics' Association in 2012 and 2015.

In 2022, he released the film Burning Days, which had its world premiere at the Un Certain Regard section of the 2022 Cannes Film Festival, where it was a nominee for the Queer Palm. In December 2022, well after the film had already premiered both at Cannes and Antalya Golden Orange Film Festival, the Turkish General Directorate of Cinema demanded repayment of the production funding it had granted to the film. Although they did not officially state a reason for the demand, it was believed to relate to the controversy around the film's LGBTQ+ themes.

His next feature film, Salvation (2026), will have its world premiere at the main competition of the 76th Berlin International Film Festival, where it was nominated for the Golden Bear.

== Influences ==
At 18, Emin Alper was stirred upon watching Emir Kusturica’s Time of the Gypsies, which made him, in his own words, “aware of the magic of cinema.” He is influenced by the works of Luchino Visconti, Rainer Werner Fassbinder and Michael Haneke.

The storyline of Ahmet’s relation with the stray dog he adopts is inspired by Thomas Mann’s story A Man and His Dog.

== Cinematic style ==
Alper's style blends his analytical background and knowledge of Turkish history. He has an interest in sociological parables, which feature in both Beyond the Hill (2012) and Frenzy (2015).

In an interview at the Venice Film Festival, Alper defines his style as “paranoia and dream versus reality.” Boyd van Hoeij in the Hollywood Reporter mirrors the director’s cinematic signature, writing “Some of these might be subjective point-of-view shots, or dreams, nightmares or hallucinations...since the film’s real world isn't as clearly defined, with Istanbul really seeming to be in the grip of increasing chaos and paranoia...” Besides blurring the lines between dream and reality, Alper plays with color and texture, creating a sense of psychic claustrophobia, made all the more tangible by the sound work of conceptual Turkish musician Cevdet Erek.

== Filmography ==
Year	English title	Original title	Notes
2012	Beyond the Hill	Tepenin Ardı	
2015	Frenzy	Abluka	
2019	Tale of Three Sisters	Kız Kardeşler	
2022	Burning Days	Kurak Günler	
2026	Salvation	Kurtuluş	Silver Bear Grand Jury Prize
