= Czech Lion Award for Best Foreign Film =

Czech film award

- First award: 1993–2014
- Website: https://www.filmovaakademie.cz

Czech Lion Award for Best Foreign Film was awards given to the best non-Czech motion picture. It was discontinued in 2014.

== Winners ==
Year	Name	Director	Country
1993	Blade Runner	Ridley Scott	United States
1994	Forrest Gump	Robert Zemeckis	United States
1995	Léon: The Professional	Luc Besson	France
1996	Trainspotting	Danny Boyle	United Kingdom
1997	Breaking the Waves	Lars von Trier	Denmark
1998	Saving Private Ryan	Steven Spielberg	United States
1999	Shakespeare in Love	John Madden	United States
2000	American Beauty	Sam Mendes	United States
2001	Amélie	Jean-Pierre Jeunet	France
2002	Talk to Her	Pedro Almodóvar	Spain
2003	The Pianist (2002 film)	Roman Polanski	France
2004	The Barbarian Invasions	Denys Arcand	Canada
2005	Broken Flowers	Jim Jarmusch	United States
2006	Volver	Pedro Almodóvar	Spain
2007	The Art of Negative Thinking	Bård Breien	Norway
2008	No Country for Old Men	Ethan Coen, Joel Coen	United States
2009	Slumdog Millionaire	Danny Boyle	United Kingdom
2010	Inception	Christopher Nolan	United States
2011	The King's Speech	Tom Hooper	United Kingdom
2012	The Intouchables	Olivier Nakache, Éric Toledano	France
