= 42nd Karlovy Vary International Film Festival =

2007 film festival edition

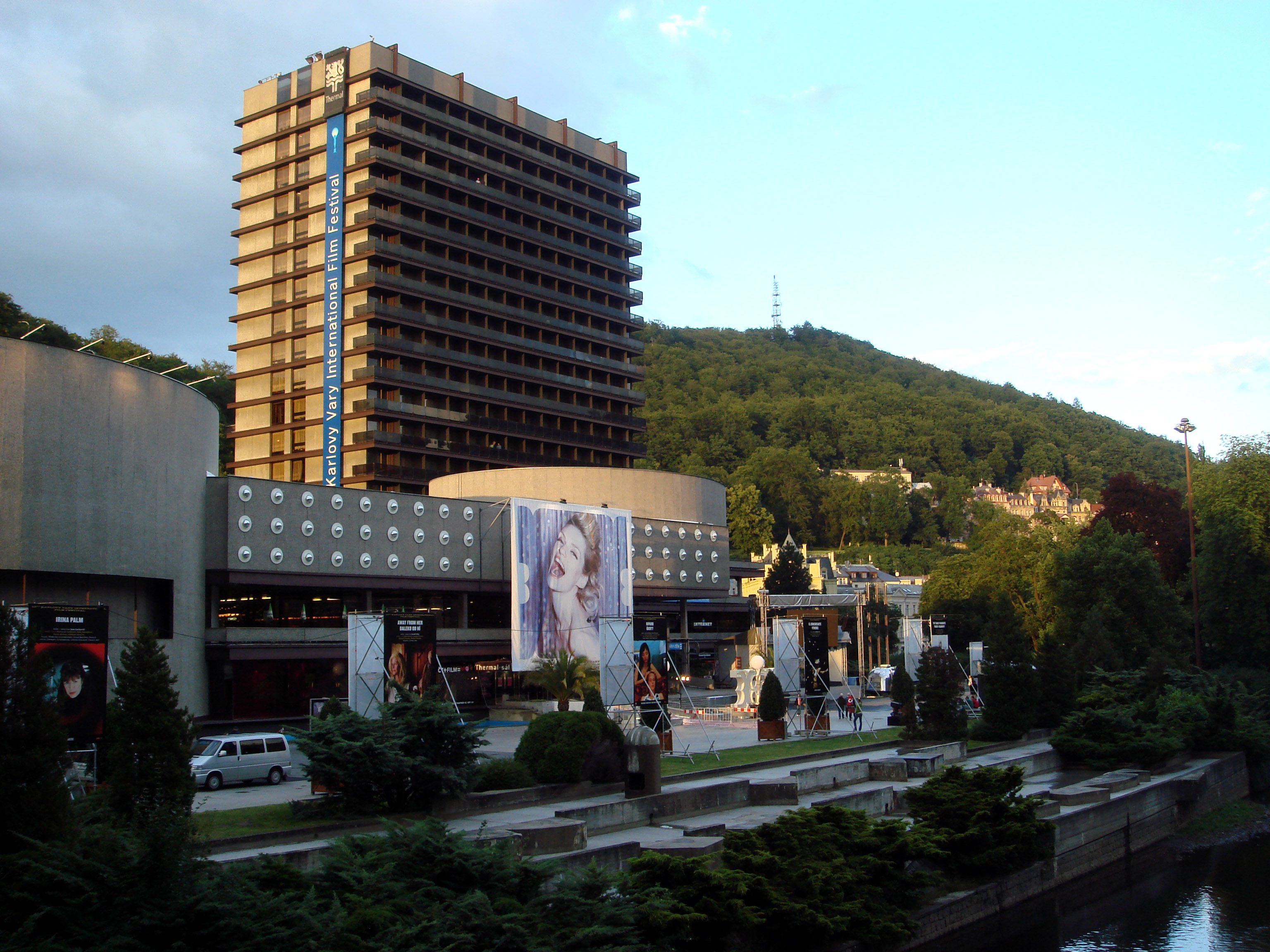
The Hotel Thermal, main center of the festival, during the 2007 edition.

The 42nd Karlovy Vary International Film Festival from 29 June to 7 July 2007. The Crystal Globe was won by Jar City, an Icelandic police detective film directed by Baltasar Kormákur. The second prize, the Special Jury Prize was won by Lucky Miles, an Australian drama directed by Michael James Rowland. Bård Breien was named Best Director. The Best Actress title went to Elvira Mínguez, and Best Actor to Sergey Puskepalis.

== Juries ==
The following people formed the juries of the festival:

Main competition

- Peter Bart, Grand Jury President (USA)
- Karl Baumgartner (Germany)
- Jean-Luc Bideau (Switzerland, France)
- Nandita Das (India)
- Daniele Gaglianone (Italy)
- Arsinée Khanjian (Canada)
- David Ondříček (Czech Republic)

Documentaries

- Dimitri Eipides, Chairman (Greece)
- Anna Buccheti (Italy)
- Anchalee Chaiworaporn (Thailand)
- Manuel Grosso Galván (Spain)
- Marko Škop (Slovak Republic)

East of the West

- Stefan Laudyn, Chairman (Poland)
- Andreas Horvath (Austria)
- Marta Nováková (Czech Republic)
- Alissa Simon (USA)
- Ivan Shvedoff (Russia)

== Official selection awards ==
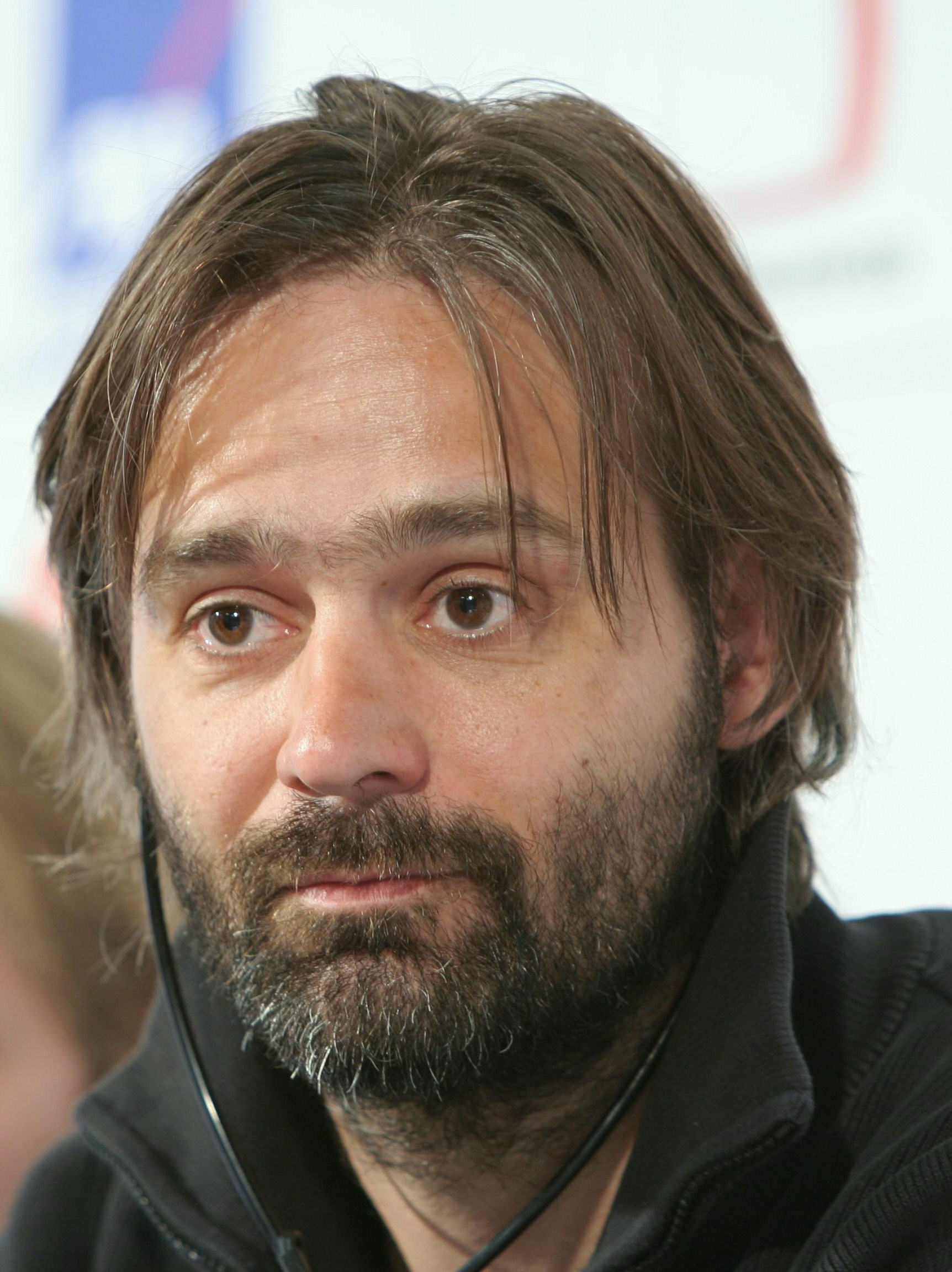
Baltasar Kormákur winner of the 2007 Crystal Globe

The following feature films and people received the official selection awards:

- Crystal Globe (Grand Prix) - Jar City (Mýrin) by Baltasar Kormákur (Iceland, Germany)
- Special Jury Prize - Lucky Miles by Michael James Rowland (Australia)
- Best Director Award - Bård Breien for The Art of Negative Thinking (Kunsten å tenke negativt) (Norway)
- Best Actress Award - Elvira Mínguez for Pudor (Spain)
- Best Actor Award - Sergey Puskepalis for Simple Things (Prostyje vešči) (Russia)
- Special mention of the jury:
  - Leonid Bronevoy for his role in Simple Things (Prostyje vešči) (Russia)
  - Zdeněk Svěrák for the screenplay of Empties (Vratné lahve) (Czech Republic, UK, Denmark)

== Other statutory awards ==
Other statutory awards that were conferred at the festival:

- Best documentary film (over 30 min) - Ztracená dovolená (en. Lost Holiday) by Lucie Králová (Czech Republic)
  - Special mention - The Mosquito Problem and Other Stories (Problemat s komarite i drugi istorii) by Andrey Paounov (Bulgaria)
- Best documentary film (under 30 min) - Artel by Sergey Loznitsa (Russia)
  - Special mention - Theodore (Teodors) by Laila Pakalnina (Latvia)
- East of the West Award - Armin by Ognjen Sviličić (Croatia, Germany, Bosnia and Herzegovina)
  - Special Mention - The Class (Klass) by Ilmar Raag (Estonia)
- Crystal Globe for Outstanding Artistic Contribution to World Cinema - Danny DeVito (USA), Břetislav Pojar (Czech Republic)
- Audience Award - Empties (Vratné lahve) by Jan Svěrák (*Czech Republic, UK, Denmark)

== Non-statutory awards ==
The following non-statutory awards were conferred at the festival:

- FIPRESCI International Critics Award: Simple Things (Prostyje vešči) by Alexey Popogrebsky (Russia)
- Don Quixote Award: Jar City (Mýrin) by Baltasar Kormákur (Iceland, Germany)
- Ecumenical Jury Award: Simple Things (Prostyje vešči) by Alexey Popogrebsky (Russia)
  - Special mention - Conversation with My Gardener (Dialogue avec mon jardinier) by Jean Becker (France)
- Europa Cinemas Label - The Class (Klass) by Ilmar Raag (Estonia)
- Czech TV Award - Independent Camera: Pingpong by Matthias Luthardt (Germany)
- NETPAC Award: The Band’s Visit (Bikur hatizmoret) by Eran Kolirin (Israel, France)
