= Heart of Sarajevo for Best Actress in a Comedy Series =

The Heart of Sarajevo for Best Actress in a Comedy Series is an award presented as part of the Sarajevo Film Festival's Heart of Sarajevo for TV Series. This category honors the best performance by an actress in a drama series. The winner is determined by a jury consisting of over 500 film professionals from the region. In 2024, the comedy series considered were from Bosnia and Herzegovina, Croatia, Serbia, Montenegro, North Macedonia, Kosovo and Slovenia.

== Winners and nominees ==
Year	Winner and nominees	English title	Original title	Character
2022 (27th)	(Serbia) Jasna Đuričić	Advokado		Sunčica
2022 (27th)	(Serbia) Nataša Ninković	United Brothers - Next Generation	Složna braća - Next Generation	Vikica Čoško
2022 (27th)	(Serbia) Milena Predić		Čudne ljubavi	Bojana
2022 (27th)	(Bosnia and Herzegovina) Tatjana Šojić	Crazy, Confused, Normal	Lud, zbunjen, normalan	Marija Mrvica

Year	Winner and nominees	English title	Original title	Character
2023 (29th)	(Serbia) Nina Janković	Mama i tata se igraju rata		Jadranka Radisavljević
2023 (29th)	(Bosnia and Herzegovina) Aida Bukva		Tender	Branka Pejić
2023 (29th)	(Serbia) Gorica Popović		Popadija	Živana

Year	Winner and nominees	English title	Original title	Character	Ref.
2024 (30th)	(Serbia) Olga Odanović	Radio Mileva		Milena Majstorović	
2024 (30th)	(Bosnia and Herzegovina) Mediha Musliović		Princ iz Eleja	Tetka	

== See also ==
- Sarajevo Film Festival
- David di Donatello for Best Actress
- Goya Award for Best Actress
- Polish Academy Award for Best Actress
- Robert Award for Best Actress in a Leading Role
