= Human Rights Award =

Human Rights Award(s) may refer to:

- Human Rights Award (Sarajevo Film Festival) (from 2004), an award given at the Sarajevo Film Festival, for a documentary film dealing with human rights
- Human Rights Award of Korea (from 2005), the highest human rights award of the Republic of Korea
- Human Rights Awards (Australia) (from 1987), a series of Australian human rights awards bestowed by the Human Rights Commission
- Several awards on the list of human rights awards
