= Heart of Sarajevo for Best Actress in a Drama Series =

The Heart of Sarajevo for Best Actress in a Drama Series is an award presented as part of the Sarajevo Film Festival's Heart of Sarajevo for TV Series. This category honors the best performance by an actress in a drama series. The winner is determined by a jury consisting of over 500 film professionals from the region. In 2024, the drama series considered were from Bosnia and Herzegovina, Croatia, Serbia, Montenegro, North Macedonia, Kosovo and Slovenia.

== Winners and nominees ==
Year	Winner and nominees	English title	Original title	Character
2021 (27th)	(Serbia) Jasna Đuričić	Group		Mirjana Tomić Sremica
2021 (27th)	(Serbia) Mirjana Karanović	The Family	Porodica	Mirjana Marković
2021 (27th)	(Croatia) Tihana Lazović		Tajkun	Ksenija Milenić
2021 (27th)	(Croatia) Jelena Miholjević	Black & White World	Crno-bijeli svijet	Ksenija Kipčić
2021 (27th)	(Croatia) Olga Pakalović	The Paper	Novine	Alenka Jović Marinković
2021 (27th)	(Slovenia) Nika Rozman	The Lake	Jezero	Tina Lanc
2021 (27th)	(Serbia) Jovana Stojiljković		Južni vetar	Sofija
2021 (27th)	(Serbia) Nada Šargin		Kalup	Natalija Velisavljević

Year	Winner and nominees	English title	Original title	Character
2022 (28th)	(Serbia) Ivana Vuković	Kljun		Sonja Kljun
2022 (28th)	(Serbia) Jelena Đokić	Black Wedding	Crna svadba	Nataša Janković
2022 (28th)	(Croatia) Tihana Lazović	The Last Socialist Artefact	Područje bez signala	Lipša
2022 (28th)	(Ukraine) Kseniya Mishina	Silence	Šutnja	Olga
2022 (28th)	(Slovenia) Nika Rozman	Lenin's Park	Leninov park	Tina Lanc
2022 (28th)	(Serbia) Hana Selimović		Besa	Divna Dukić
2022 (28th)	(Serbia) Jovana Stojiljković	The Last Socialist Artefact	Područje bez signala	Šeila
2022 (28th)	(Serbia) Nada Šargin		Vreme zla	Milena Katić

Year	Winner and nominees	English title	Original title	Character
2023 (29th)	(Serbia) Jovana Stojiljković	Južni vetar: Na granici, Vera		Sofija, Vera Pešić
2023 (29th)	(Bosnia and Herzegovina) Vedrana Božinović		Kotlina	Selma
2023 (29th)	(Serbia) Anica Dobra		Beležnica profesora Miškovića	Jelisaveta Mišković
2023 (29th)	(Serbia) Milica Janevski		Pad, Bunar	Sanja Maslać, Doplerka
2023 (29th)	(Slovenia) Katarina Stegnar		Trigrad	Jasna

Year	Winner and nominees	English title	Original title	Character
2024 (30th)	(Serbia) Jasna Đuričić	I Know Your Soul		Nevena Murtežić
2024 (30th)	(Serbia) Mirjana Joković		Poziv	Anica Reljić
2024 (30th)	(Serbia) Vesna Trivalić		Koža	Natalija

== Multiple wins ==
=== Multiple wins ===
Wins	Actress
2	(Serbia) Jasna Đuričić

=== Multiple nominations ===
Nominations	Actress
3	(Serbia) Jovana Stojiljković
2	(Serbia) Jasna Đuričić
2	(Croatia) Tihana Lazović
2	(Slovenia) Nika Rozman
2	(Serbia) Nada Šargin

== See also ==
- Sarajevo Film Festival
- David di Donatello for Best Actress
- Goya Award for Best Actress
- Polish Academy Award for Best Actress
- Robert Award for Best Actress in a Leading Role
