= The Mosquito Problem and Other Stories =

The Mosquito Problem and other stories
- Directed by: Andrey Paounov
- Written by: Lilia Topouzova & Andrey Paounov
- Produced by: Martichka Bozhilova
- Cinematography: Boris Misirkov & Georgi Bogdanov
- Edited by: Andrey Paounov & Orlin Ruevski
- Music by: Ivo Paounov
- Distributed by: TV 2 / Danmark
- Release date: 2007
- Running time: 100 minutes
- Country: Bulgaria
- Language: Bulgarian

The Mosquito Problem and Other Stories (Bulgarian: Проблемът с комарите и други истории, romanized: Problemŭt s komarite i drugi istorii) is a Bulgarian documentary feature film directed by Andrey Paounov and written by professor Lilia Topouzova. It was included in the 46th International Critics' Week of the Cannes Film Festival in 2007.

== Plot ==
The city of Belene in northern Bulgaria is about to be transformed by the planned Belene Nuclear Power Plant. Large rusty cranes, foreign investors, and the joyful chants are seen around the city. The townsfolk celebrate the power plant by engraving its logo on buildings and soup bowls, however they are also disturbed by gigantic stinging mosquitoes which loom over the city the dark clouds and descend on the townsfolk. Belene's history includes an issue that no one wants to remember: the Belene labour camp, which has caused many stories of crime in the city.

The city in the film is transformed by ideologies, regimes, and dreams of economic prosperity. The film's characters whose lives intersect in a sinister past, nuclear future, and the stinging mosquitoes flying through time. The idea for the film started with the research of professor Lilia Topouzova, a historian and filmmaker who studied the Bulgarian Gulag camps.

The film was directed by Andrey Paounov.

== Reception ==
The film had its world premiere at the 46th International Critics' Week of the Cannes Film Festival in 2007, and was screened at international film festivals including Toronto International Film Festival, Karlovy Vary International Film Festival, Busan International Film Festival, and London Film Festival. It was released in Bulgarian cinemas in 2008.

== Awards ==
- The Times BFI London Film Festival Grierson Award
- First Prize of the Jury Festival Internacional de Documentales de Madrid
- Human Rights Award Sarajevo Film Festival
- Special Jury Mention Karlovy Vary Award Winners 2007
- Grand Prize Sunny Side of the Doc 2008 Award, by Panavision
- Best film OFF Docúpolis section at Festival Documental Internacional de Barcelona
- Grand Prix - Docufest, International Documentary and Short FF, Prizren, Kosovo
- The Best Documentary Award at MEDIAWAVE
- Best Documentary at the 15th L'Alternativa - Barcelona Independent Film Festival
- Best full-length non-feature film – Shaken's Stars IFF 2008, Almaty, Kazakhstan
- A-to-A Award for best regional film - Motovun FF, Croatia
- Honorary Mention at the 8th goEast Festival of Central and Eastern European Film
- Special Mention - BRITDOC Festival, Oxford
- Zolotoy Vityaz (The Golden Knight Award) Moscow
- Nominated for the Adolf Grimme Award
