= Walking on Water (2018 film) =

2018 film

- Film poster
- Directed by: Andrey Paounov
- Produced by: Valeria Giampietro, Izabella Tzenkova
- Starring: Christo
- Edited by: Anastas Petkov, Andrey Paounov
- Release date: 1 September 2018 (LFF)
- Running time: 105 minutes
- Language: English

Walking on Water is a 2018 international coproduction documentary film directed by Andrey Paounov. It chronicles The Floating Piers, Christo's first major project after the death of his wife and long-time collaborator Jeanne-Claude.
