= The Boy Who Was a King =

- Directed by: Andrey Paounov
- Written by: Andrey Paounov
- Produced by: Martichka Bozhilova
- Cinematography: Boris Misirkov & Georgi Bogdanov
- Edited by: Svetla Neykova, Andrey Paounov, Rene Froelke, Georgi Bogdanov
- Music by: Ivo Paounov
- Release date: 2011
- Running time: 90 minutes
- Country: Bulgaria
- Language: Bulgarian

The Boy Who Was a King (Bulgarian: Момчето, което беше цар, romanized: Momcheto, koeto beshe tsar) is a 2011 Bulgarian documentary film about Simeon Saxe-Coburg-Gotha, directed by Andrey Paounov. The film received nominations and awards at various international film festivals. It was included in the official selections of Toronto International Film Festival, International Documentary Film Festival Amsterdam and others. The film is the third part of director Andrey Paounov's unofficial trilogy on the "absurdity of the Bulgarian transition period".

== Plot ==
The film tells the story of Simeon Saxe-Coburg-Gotha, the last Bulgarian Tsar. He assumed the throne at the age of six, when his father Boris III of Bulgaria died. However, the boy held the throne for only three years due to the establishment of a socialist regime in the country. The former Tsar was exiled and he spent the following decades in various countries across the globe.

A few years after the fall of the socialist regime in 1989, Simeon Saxe-Coburg-Gotha returned to Bulgaria for the first time since 1946. He was welcomed by wide-spread popular enthusiasm and was elected as a prime minister in 2001. In the harsh political climate of the country in its transitional period, Simeon Saxe-Coburg-Gotha's political career lasted only one term.

The film presents not only the life of the former Tsar, but also intertwines within the story vignettes of various Bulgarians, who were supporting him, sending him gifts, or merely tattooing his face on their body. The story is told through personal footage and vast amounts of archive material.

== Reception ==
The film received praise for its editing and use of archives with Variety's Robert Koehler writing that "Pic’s terrific use of archival footage includes an exiled Simeon interviewed in the early ’60s, disputing his playboy rep." and "Editing is aces."
