= Hearts of Sarajevo for TV Series =

Heart of Sarajevo for TV Series Srce Sarajeva / Срце Сарајева
- Location: Sarajevo
- Country: Bosnia and Herzegovina
- Presented by: Sarajevo Film Festival
- First award: 2021
- Website: www.sff.ba

The Heart of Sarajevo (Bosnian, Croatian, and Serbian: Srce Sarajeva / Срце Сарајева) is the highest award presented across all competition categories at the Sarajevo Film Festival. Established in 2021, a separate category of the Heart of Sarajevo award for television series, also titled the Heart of Sarajevo, was introduced. The nominations and awards in this category are determined by an expert jury composed of over 500 film professionals from the region.

== Award categories ==
=== Current categories ===
- Best Drama Series
- Best Actress in a Drama Series
- Best Actor in a Drama Series
- Best Supporting Actress in a Drama Series
- Best Supporting Actor in a Drama Series
- Rising Star in a Drama Series
- Best Screenplay of a Drama Series
- Best Direction of a Drama Series
- Best Comedy Series
- Best Actress in a Comedy Series
- Best Actor in a Comedy Series
- Rising Star in a Comedy Series
- Best Screenplay of a Comedy Series
- Best Direction of a Comedy Series

=== Defunct awards ===
- Heart of Sarajevo for Best Creator of a Drama Series
- Best Creator of a Comedy Series

== See also ==
- Heart of Sarajevo
- MESS (festival)
- List of Bosnia and Herzegovina films
- Cinema of Europe
- List of cinema of the world
- World cinema
