= Georgi and the Butterflies =

- Directed by: Andrey Paounov
- Written by: Andrey Paounov
- Produced by: Martichka Bozhilova
- Cinematography: Boris Misirkov and Georgi Bogdanov
- Edited by: Zoritsa Kozeva
- Music by: Ivo Paounov and Vihren Paunov
- Distributed by: TV 2 / Danmark
- Release date: 2004
- Running time: 60 minutes
- Country: Bulgaria
- Language: Bulgarian

Georgi and the Butterflies is a Bulgarian documentary film from 2004. It was directed by Andrey Paounov. The film won the "Silver Wolf" award at the International Documentary Film Festival Amsterdam.

== Plot ==
The film tells the story of a man and his dream. This man is Dr Georgi Lulchev, a psychiatrist, neurologist, Chinese medicine man, administrator, amateur chef, entrepreneur and Director of a nursing home for people with intellectual disabilities located at Podgumer village. His dream is to build a farm located in the yard of the home, where the patients can take care of snails, ostriches and pheasants so they can produce silk fibres and soybean food. This is a story full of optimism, snails, ostriches, silk, charity, the Eastern Orthodox Church, soybean food, schizophrenics, oligophrenics, psychopaths, Western hunters, misery, compassion, business and butterflies.

== Reception ==
Variety gave it a positive review, noting that the documentary "is full of lovely touches; patients (never presented exploitatively) are introduced via their unique eating utensils, and music is marvelously used to suit each section."

Georgi and the Butterflies screened at more than 70 international film festivals and won numerous awards including: Silver Wolf at International Documentary Film Festival Amsterdam, Human Rights Award at Sarajevo Film Festival, Don Quixote Award at Cracow Film Festival, Grand Prize at Mediawave, Audience Award at Trieste Film Festival etc. It was the first feature documentary to be released in Bulgarian cinema. The film was released theatrically across Europe by CinemaNet Europe in 2005.
