= Human Rights Award (Sarajevo Film Festival) =

Award given at the Sarajevo Film Festival

The Human Rights Award (Sarajevo Film Festival) is an award given at the Sarajevo Film Festival. The award is given for the best film from the competition documentary program dealing with the subject of human rights. It was first awarded in 2004, at the 10th edition of festival, and has since become a traditional award. The Human Rights Award is provided by the Swiss Federal Department of Foreign Affairs.

== Award winners ==
Year	Film	Original title	Director(s)	Nationality
2004	Imported Crows	Uvozne vrane	Goran Dević	Croatia
2005	Borderline Lovers	Ljubav na granici	Miroslav Mandić	Bosnia and Herzegovina
2006	Vukovar – Final Cut	Vukovar - poslednji rez	Janko Baljak	Serbia
2007	The Mosquito Problem and Other Stories	Problemat s komarite i drugi istorii	Andrey Paounov	Bulgaria
2008	Divorce Albanian Style	Razvod po albanski	Adela Peeva	Bulgaria
2009	Hot Blood	Vrela krv	Marko Mamuzić	Serbia
2010	Mila Seeking Senida	Mila traži Senidu	Robert Tomić Zuber	Croatia
2011	Ecumenopolis: City Without Limits	Ekümenopolis: Ucu olmayan şehir	Imre Azem	Turkey
2012	Real Man's Film	Muški film	Nebojša Slijepčević	Croatia
2013	Married to the Swiss Franc	U braku sa švicarcem	Arsen Oremović	Croatia
2014	Judgement in Hungary	Judgement in Hungary	Eszter Hajdu	Hungary
2015	One Day in Sarajevo	Jedan dan u Sarajevu	Jasmila Žbanić	Bosnia and Herzegovina
2016	Scream for me Sarajevo	Scream for me Sarajevo	Tarik Hodžić	Bosnia and Herzegovina
2017	Mr. Gay Syria	Mr. Gay Syria	Ayşe Toprak	Turkey
2018	Araf	Araf	Didem Pekün	Turkey
2019	The Euphoria of Being	A létezés eufóriája	Réka Szabó	Hungary
2020	Acasă, My Home	Acasă, My Home	Radu Ciorniciuc	Romania
2021	Les Enfants Terribles	Les Enfants Terribles	Ahmet Necdet Çupu	Turkey
2022	Bigger Than Trauma	Veće od traume	Vedrana Pribačić	Croatia
2023	Silence of Reason	Šutnja razuma	Kumjana Novakova	North Macedonia
2024	Your Life Without Me		Anna Rubi	Hungary
