= The Art of Negative Thinking =

2006 Norwegian black comedy film

- Poster and cover art of the film
- Directed by: Bård Breien
- Written by: Bård Breien
- Produced by: Dag Alveberg
- Production company: Maipo film- og TV-produksjon
- Distributed by: TrustNordisk
- Release date: 11 November 2006
- Running time: 79 minutes
- Country: Norway
- Language: Norwegian

The Art of Negative Thinking (Norwegian: Kunsten å tenke negativt) is a 2006 Norwegian black comedy film directed and written by Bård Breien. The storyline revolves around a man (played by Fridtjov Såheim) who is adjusting to life in a wheelchair, and the socializing group he is made to join. The film was Breien's directorial debut. It was produced by Dag Alveberg for the production company Maipo film- og TV-produksjon. The Art of Negative Thinking was successful both domestically and internationally, with sales of 35,000 tickets in its Norwegian theater run and the highest-gross in Germany for any Nordic film during 2008. Reviews were mostly positive and the film won multiple international awards.

== Plot ==
A support group takes a van to visit a 33-year-old man named Geirr who was in a car accident that made him a paraplegic two years prior. Geirr is paralyzed and impotent from the waist down and gets around with assistance from his wife, a motorized stair climber, and a wheelchair. He tells his loving and devoted wife, Ingvild, how terrible his life is and is drenched in bitterness, spending his time drinking booze, smoking marijuana, and watching films based on the Vietnam War.

In an attempt to get her husband to look more favorably on his life and to save their marriage, Ingvild signs Geirr up for a positivity group meeting. All the members of the group have different disabilities, and with the help of an enthusiastic group leader Tori (who has no disability) they are forbidden to say anything negative and encourage each other to see things more positively. The group includes Marta, who is a quadriplegic as a result of a climbing accident; Gard, Marta's self-absorbed boyfriend who feels guilty for accidentally causing the climbing accident; Asbjørn, a stroke victim full of suppressed anger; Lillemor, an old divorced woman who complains often.

Tori does her best to get Geirr to appreciate his life. The rest of the group helps her by offering sympathy and encouragement. Tori tells Geirr to focus on solutions and not problems, while Geirr rebels. With irreverence he promotes the view that there are no solutions at all. Eventually he turns the group to his side by having them acknowledge and revel in their problems, dropping the facade of positive thinking and happiness.

As Geirr gradually takes control of the group he initiates arguments about who is the worst off with the most serious problems, and who is malingerering or does not belong. After dramatic emotional breakdowns, the group members discover solidarity and emotional release by being honest and dropping the facade they have built around themselves. They become familiar with each other, they become friends, and they learn the art of thinking negatively.

== Cast ==
- Fridtjov Såheim as Geirr
- Kjersti Holmen as Tori
- Henrik Mestad as Gard
- Marian Saastad Ottesen as Marte
- Kari Simonsen as Lillemor
- Kirsti Eline Torhaug as Ingvild
- Per Schaaning as Asbjørn

== Release ==
The Art of Negative Thinking was released in Norway on 11 November 2006 and its international run began in June 2007. It was distributed in Norway by Columbia Tristar Nordisk Film Distributors, and internationally by the Danish company TrustNordisk. The film sold 35,000 tickets in its Norwegian theater run, and was the highest-grossing Nordic film of 2008 in Germany with a total of 70,000 admissions. The second highest-grossing Nordic film of that year was You, the Living with 60,000 admissions. In France, The Art of Negative Thinking was first screened in the CineNordica program in Paris and then launched in theaters on 26 November 2008.

== Reception ==
The Art of Negative Thinking received multiple international film awards. It won the "Best Film" category at the Lübeck Nordic Film Days. Breien won the Best Director Award at the 42nd Karlovy Vary International Film Festival, and accepted the award joking that he had "been asked many times by journalists why we in Scandinavia are obsessed by making films about depressive people like alcoholics, etc. Tonight, we have success in Eastern Europe and I think you are depressed just as we are". In addition to being chosen best director, Breien was rewarded at the Karlovy festival with a deal for distribution of the film in France by the producer of a rival film at the competition. Other awards won by The Art of Negative Thinking include the Scuola Holden Award for "Best Script" at the 2007 Torino Film Festival in Italy, and the Prix de la Presse at the 2007 Rencontres Internationales de Cinéma à Paris in France.

Reception from critics has been mostly positive. Variety's Alissa Simon commented that the film "includes some barbs directed at the Norwegian state, but the issues it addresses are universal. These include how severe handicaps affect every aspect of daily life for the disabled and their loved ones — from frustrating physical challenges, through sexual and mental health, to fear of loneliness and dependency". She added that Breien "manages to sustain the darkly comic mood throughout, using acerbic dialogue [...] and cleverly chosen rock/country music extracts. Smart production design underlines the physical challenges the characters face in everyday life, both comic and poignant. Ensemble cast is first-rate, with performances treading a delicate balance between naturalism and stylization, yet managing to engage viewers' sympathy by sidestepping easy stereotypes".

The leading French newspaper Le Figaro awarded the film with three out of three stars, and the Norwegian Broadcasting Corporation's Einar Guldvog Staalesen gave it five out of six stars. Sheri Linden of The Hollywood Reporter commented that "despite its transgressive tone, the film gives way to a conventional structure". She added that some parts of the film "feel as false as the most manipulative feel-good drama's catharsis. But the strong performances and Breien's wry glance maintain the dark energy and, most important, the healthy skepticism toward self-righteous cliches that posit denial as a method of healing".

Dan Fainaru of Screen Daily described the film as offering "a refreshingly unceremonious approach to the plights of the physically impaired".

== Adaptations ==
It was adapted for stage by Daniel Hrbek, and premiered in 2010 at Švandovo divadlo in Prague.
