= Bård Breien =

Norwegian film director

- Born: November 28, 1971 (age 54)

Bård Breien (born 28 November 1971) is a Norwegian film director.

== Debut - The Art of Negative Thinking ==
Breien's first feature film as director was the 2007 movie The Art of Negative Thinking, a dark comedy about adjusting to life in a wheel chair and socializing with other people who have disabilities. The film won Breien a Crystal Globe award for best director at the Karlovy Vary International Film Festival in the Czech Republic. The movie's main character is despondent about his predicament in a wheelchair "and spends much of his time drinking, smoking pot and watching Vietnam War movies". The Art of Negative Thinking has been shown at numerous international film festivals and a Variety article described it as being about a "therapy rebellion".

== See also ==
- Norwegian films of the 2000s
