= Andrey Paounov =

Andrey M Paounov
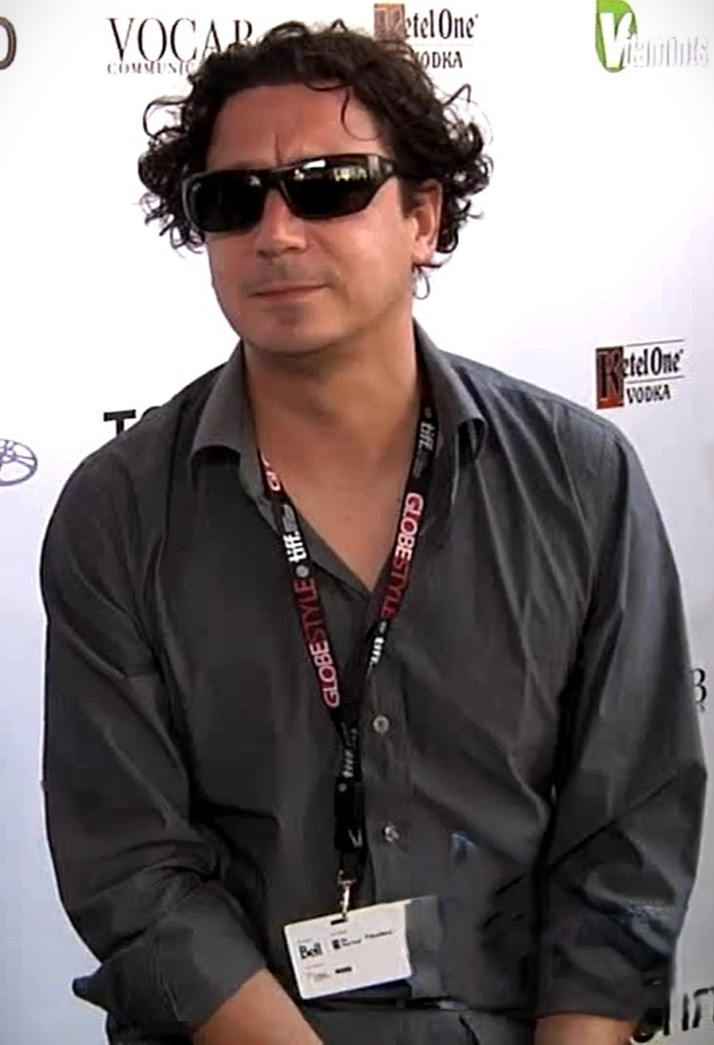
- Paounov in 2011
- Born: February 23, 1974 (age 52); Sofia, Bulgaria
- Occupations: Film director, screenwriter
- Years active: 2000–present

Andrey M Paounov (born 1974 Bulgarian: Андрей Паунов) is a Bulgarian writer and director best known for his documentary feature films. His debut Georgi and the Butterflies won the Award for Best Mid-Length Documentary (formerly: Silver Wolf Award) at the International Documentary Film Festival Amsterdam. His first feature The Mosquito Problem and Other Stories was included in the 46th International Critics' Week of the Cannes Film Festival 2007. The Boy Who Was a King (2011), Andrey's second full-length documentary, premiered at Toronto International Film Festival. It won the Best Documentary Feature Jury Award at the 2012 RiverRun International Film Festival. Walking on Water, following renowned artist Christo's Lake Iseo project, premiered at Locarno Festival 2018.

In 2021, Paounov made his fiction debut with January which received the Best Director Award at the 26th Sofia International Film Festival and Golden Rose National Film Festival Special Jury Prize.

== Filmography ==
- January (2021)
- Walking on Water (2018)
- The Boy Who Was a King (2011)
- The Mosquito Problem and Other Stories (2007)
- Georgi and the Butterflies (2004)
