= Sarajevo Film Festival =

Film festival held in Bosnia and Herzegovina

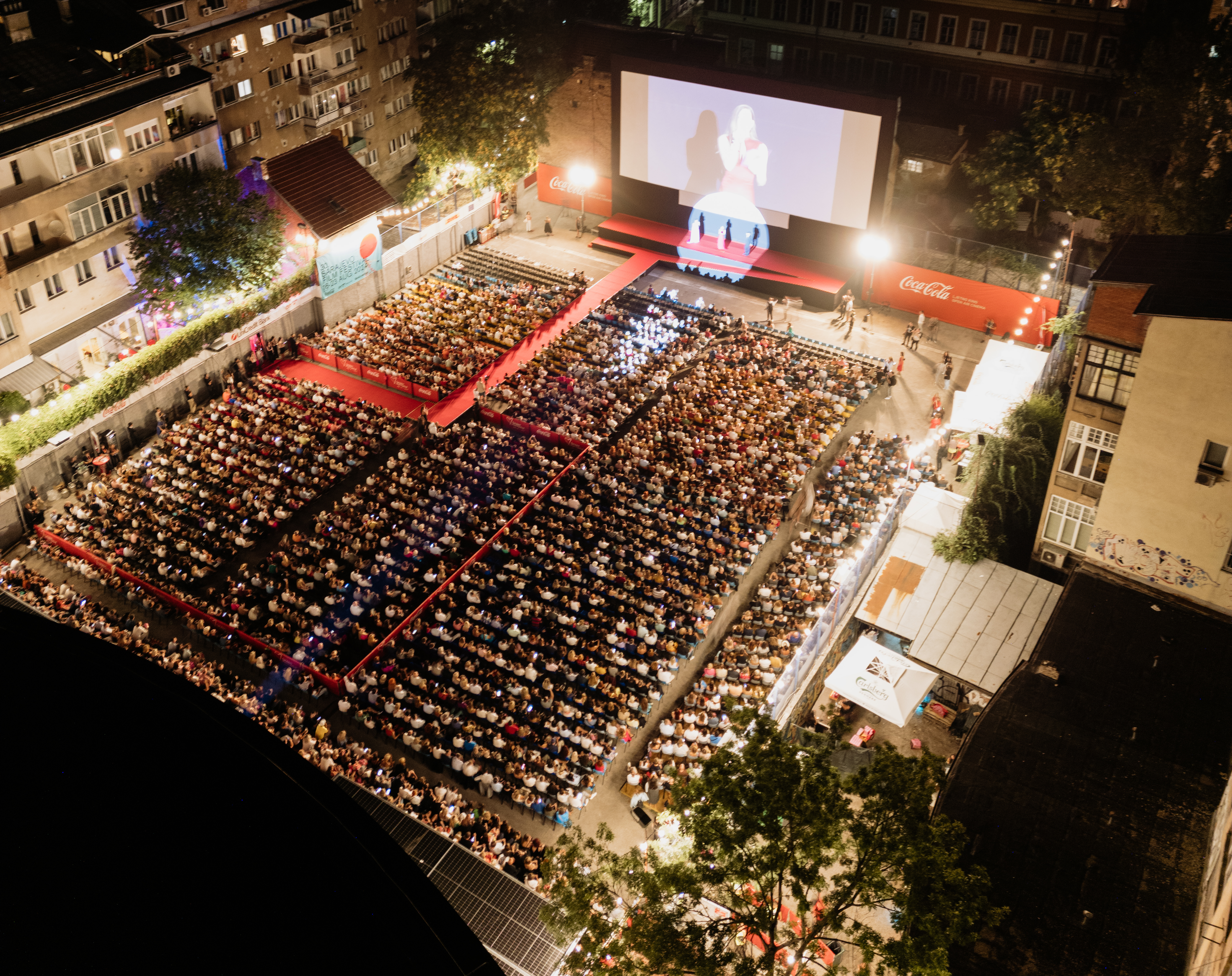
- Location: Sarajevo, Bosnia and Herzegovina
- Founded: 1995
- Most recent: 2026
- Awards: Heart of Sarajevo
- Hosted by: Directorate of Sarajevo Film Festival
- Website: www.sff.ba
- 33rd 32nd

The Sarajevo Film Festival is an annual film festival held in Sarajevo, Bosnia and Herzegovina. The premier and largest film festival in Southeastern Europe, it is also one of the largest film festivals in Europe. It was founded in Sarajevo in 1995 during the siege of Sarajevo in the Bosnian War, and brings international and local celebrities to Sarajevo every year. It is held in August and showcases an extensive variety of feature and short films from around the world.

== History ==
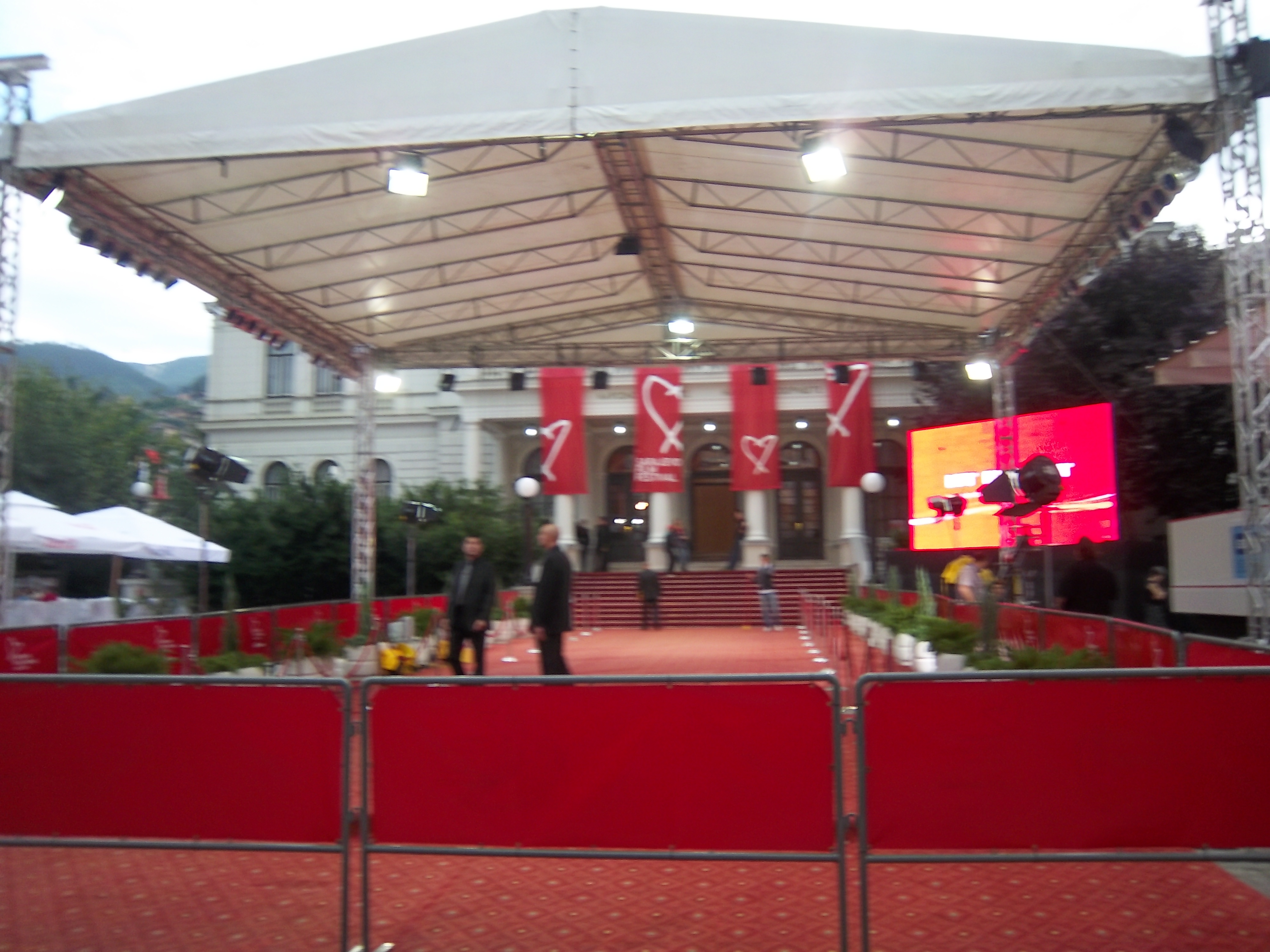
The Sarajevo Film Festival red carpet, 24 July 2011

In October 1993, a ten-day Sarajevo International Film Festival was held, directed by Haris Pašović of MESS. The success of this event, combined with the legacy of Mirsad Purivatra's and Izeta Građević's wartime film screenings from 1992, led to the establishment of an annual festival.

The first Sarajevo Film Festival was held from 25 October to 5 November 1995. At that time, the siege of Sarajevo was still going on and attendance projections were very low. However, a surprising 15,000 people came to see the films, of which there were 37 from 15 different countries. The festival grew at a remarkable pace, now being the most prominent film festival in Southeastern Europe, attracting more than 100,000 people annually on all programs and screening hundreds of films from 60 countries.

The Sarajevo Film Festival is hosted at the National Theatre in front of which the Festival Square and the red carpet are located, with screenings at the Open-air theater Metalac, Bosnian Cultural Center, Meeting Point Cinema and five other cinemas and projection locations around the city. The festival has been attended by celebrities such as Robert De Niro, Angelina Jolie, Brad Pitt, Orlando Bloom, Daniel Craig, Danny Glover, John Malkovich, Morgan Freeman, Oliver Stone, John Cleese, Steve Buscemi, Michael Fassbender, Jeremy Irons, Juliette Binoche, Bono Vox, Coolio, Mickey Rourke, Michael Moore, Gérard Depardieu, Darren Aronofsky, Gillian Anderson, Kevin Spacey, Eric Cantona, Benicio del Toro, Tim Roth, Mads Mikkelsen, Jesse Eisenberg, Alexander Payne, Meg Ryan, Stellan Skarsgård, Willem Dafoe, Woody Harrelson and many others.

By 2001, the European Film Association made the Sarajevo Film Festival one of the eleven festivals that could nominate a film for the award of "Europe's Best Short Film". The 2001 winner of the Sarajevo Film Festival, Danis Tanović's No Man's Land, went on to win an Oscar in the United States. In 2004, the Best Movie Award was named the "Heart of Sarajevo".

Beginning with the 13th Sarajevo Film Festival in 2007 and in cooperation with the Berlin International Film Festival and Berlinale Talent Campus, the Sarajevo Talent Campus has been added to the festival. In 2014, the Sarajevo Talent Campus got renamed to "Talents Sarajevo". Talents Sarajevo is an educational and creative platform for up and coming young film professionals, and has eventually come to be revered as the most prestigious film training event in the region.

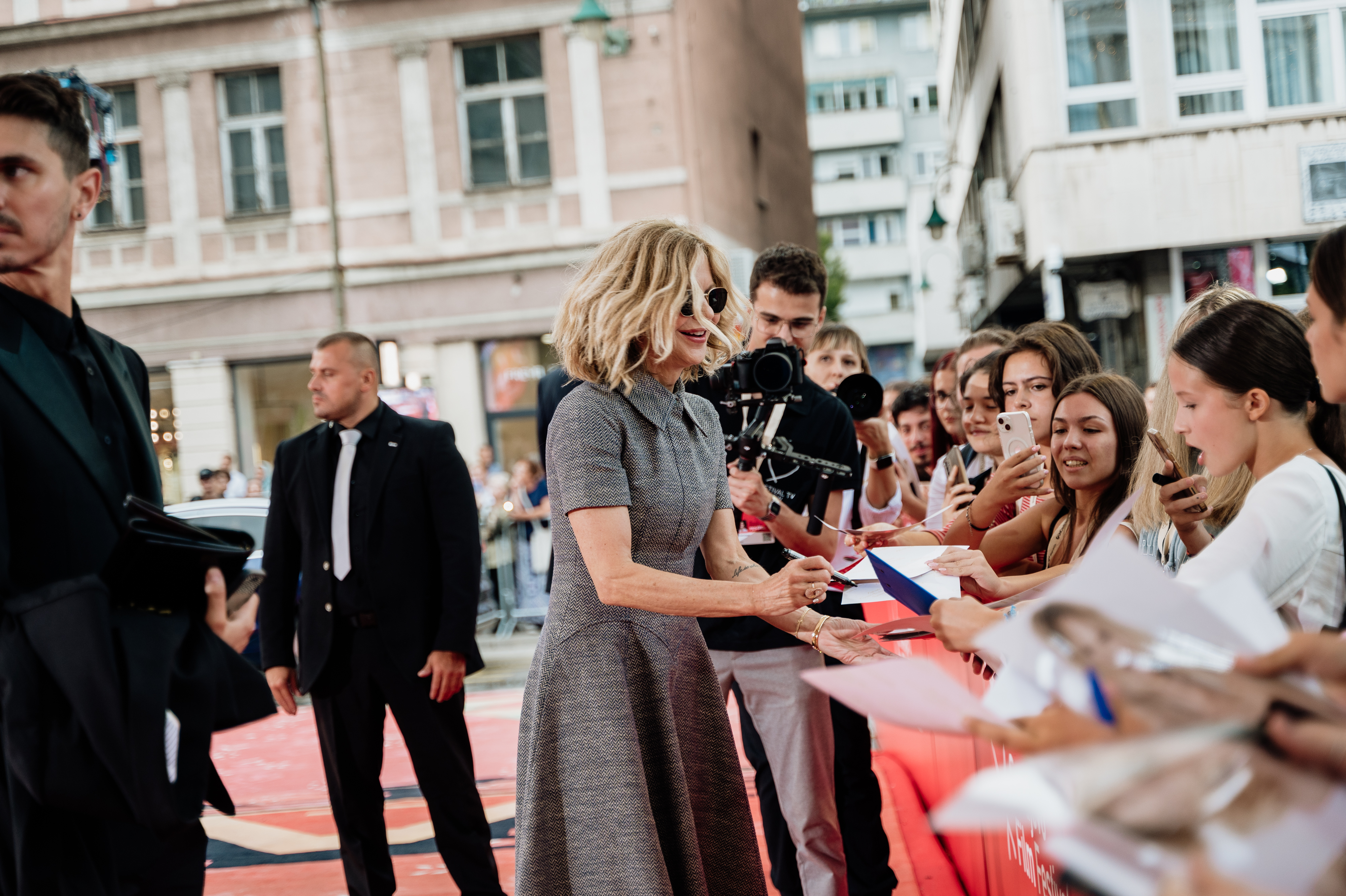
Meg Ryan greeting fans at the 2024 Sarajevo Film Festival

The festival also features CineLink, a year-long project development program resulting in an annual co-production market during the festival dates. The CineLink Market each year presents about 10 finest regional projects for feature-length fiction films, also offering festival guests a special opportunity to meet with the assembled regional industry, with emphasis on young filmmakers, producers and directors presenting their latest projects, productions and works in progress, with highlights of the regional production presented to international distributors, TV-buyers and festival programmers, making CineLink the most important international market place for new features from Southeastern Europe.

The first edition of CineLink, which was part of the 9th Sarajevo Film Festival, was held in 2003. Of the 91 entries from across the region, a three-member jury, Philippe Bober, Behrooz Hashemian and Čedomir Kolar, producers whose films have won awards at all the major international film festivals such as Cannes, Venice, Rotterdam and Berlin, chose six winning films, and the winners were: The Abandoned - Zlatko Topčić, Bosnian Pot - Vedran Fajković, Slowly - Nikola Mišić, Totally Personal - Nedžad Begović, Roses for Tosca - Branko Đurić, Simona Stražisar and Last Day - Namik Kabil.

In 2019, the Academy of Motion Picture Arts and Sciences awarded the Sarajevo Film Festival the status of the Academy Award qualifying film festival in the Short Film category. Short films that win the Heart of Sarajevo Award and the nomination for the European Film Academy (EFA) short film award at the Sarajevo Film Festival will be eligible for consideration in the Animated Short Film and Live Action Short Film category of the Academy Awards without the standard theatrical run, provided that they otherwise comply with the Academy rules.

== Festival programmes and awards ==
=== Programs ===
- Competition (feature, short and documentary and student film)
- CineLink Industry Days
- Talents Sarajevo
- In Focus
- Kinoscope
- Tribute to
- Open Air
- Summer Screen
- European Shorts
- Children's Program
- TeenArena
- Avant Premieres
- Operation Kino
- Dealing with the past
- Human Rights Day
- Sarajevo Film Festival Partnert Presents (Doha Film Institute)
- BH Film

=== Awards ===
- Heart of Sarajevo for Best Feature Film
- Special Jury Prize
- Heart of Sarajevo for Best Actor
- Heart of Sarajevo for Best Actress
- Heart of Sarajevo for Best Short Film
- Heart of Sarajevo for Best Documentary Film
- Special Jury Prize for Documentary Film
- Hearts of Sarajevo for TV Series
- Human Rights Award
- Honorary Heart of Sarajevo
- Ivica Matić Award
- CineLink Female Voices Award:

It was conceived and launched with the Slovenian Film Center in 2022. The United Nations in Bosnia and Herzegovina joined in 2024 as a co-founder, with support from the UN Secretary-General's Peacebuilding Fund (PBF) project "Women Lead the Way towards Peace and Security in Bosnia and Herzegovina". It provides support to in-development projects in the CineLink Co-Production Market and CineLink Drama that are headed by women producers or directors, giving them stronger visibility and financial backing to help bring their work to completion.

- Special Youth Perspectives Award: It was introduced with the Council of Europe in 2025 and was presented at the 31st edition of the festival.
- Prix Cineplexx: It was introduced in partnership with Cineplexx in 2026 with the 32nd edition of the festival. It is awarded to the best film in the Open Air Premiere program and is chosen by the festival audience. The award carries a total value of 20,000 euros, split into 15,000 euros’ worth of Cineplexx marketing‑campaign services to boost the winning film’s theatrical release, plus 5,000 euros in cash given directly to the film’s producer.

== Talents Sarajevo ==
Talents Sarajevo is a program launched in 2007, under the name Sarajevo Talent Campus, in co-operation with the Berlin International Film Festival and the Berlinale Talent Campus. Talents Sarajevo is an educational and networking platform for emerging film talents from Southeastern Europe (Azerbaijan, Bosnia and Herzegovina, Bulgaria, Croatia, Greece, Hungary, Kosovo, Moldova, Montenegro, North Macedonia, Romania, Slovenia, Serbia and Turkey). Each year, more than two hundred applications are received, and only eighty are carefully chosen to attend a six-day training led by some of the most prominent film professionals in the world. In addition to meeting other filmmakers and film professionals, young filmmakers are introduced to the work of established film professionals, informed about current trends and issues in the industry, and introduced to the international filmmaking community.

== Gallery ==
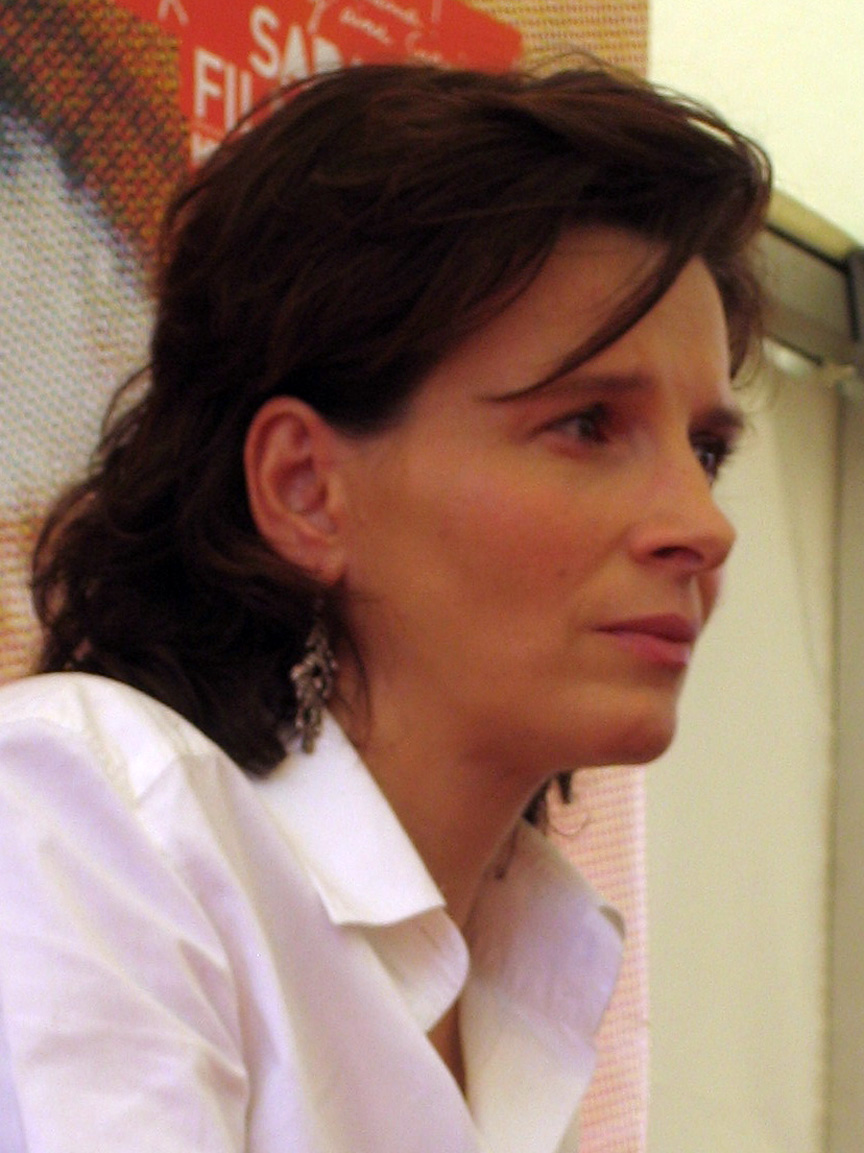
Juliette Binoche at the 2007 Sarajevo Film Festival

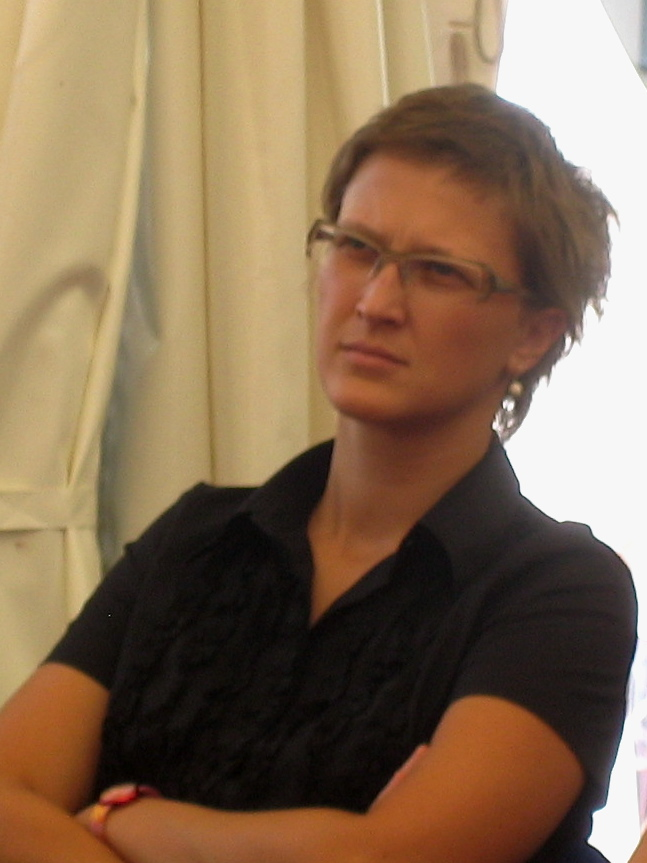
Jasmila Žbanić at the 2007 Sarajevo Film Festival

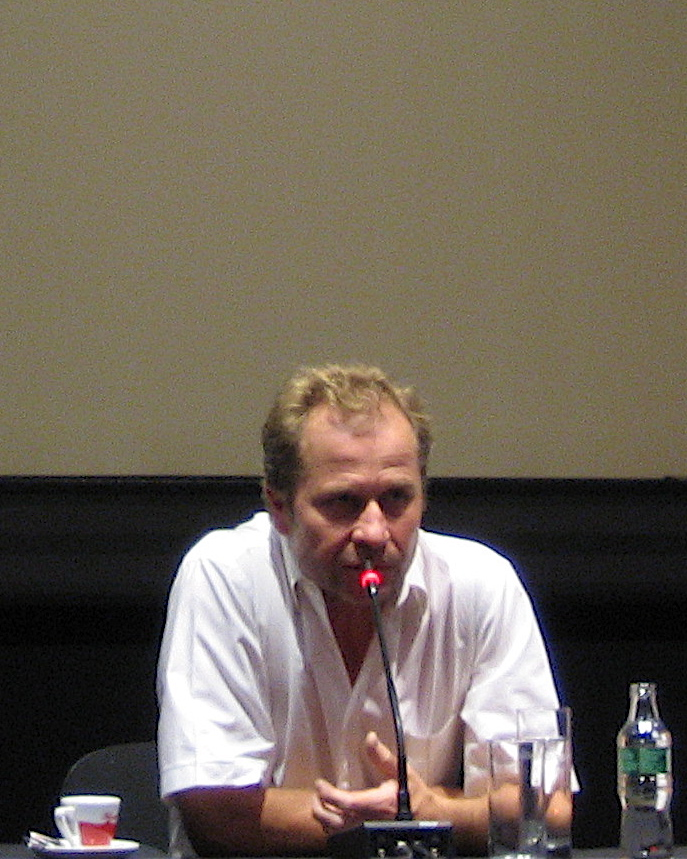
Ulrich Seidl at the 2007 Sarajevo Film Festival

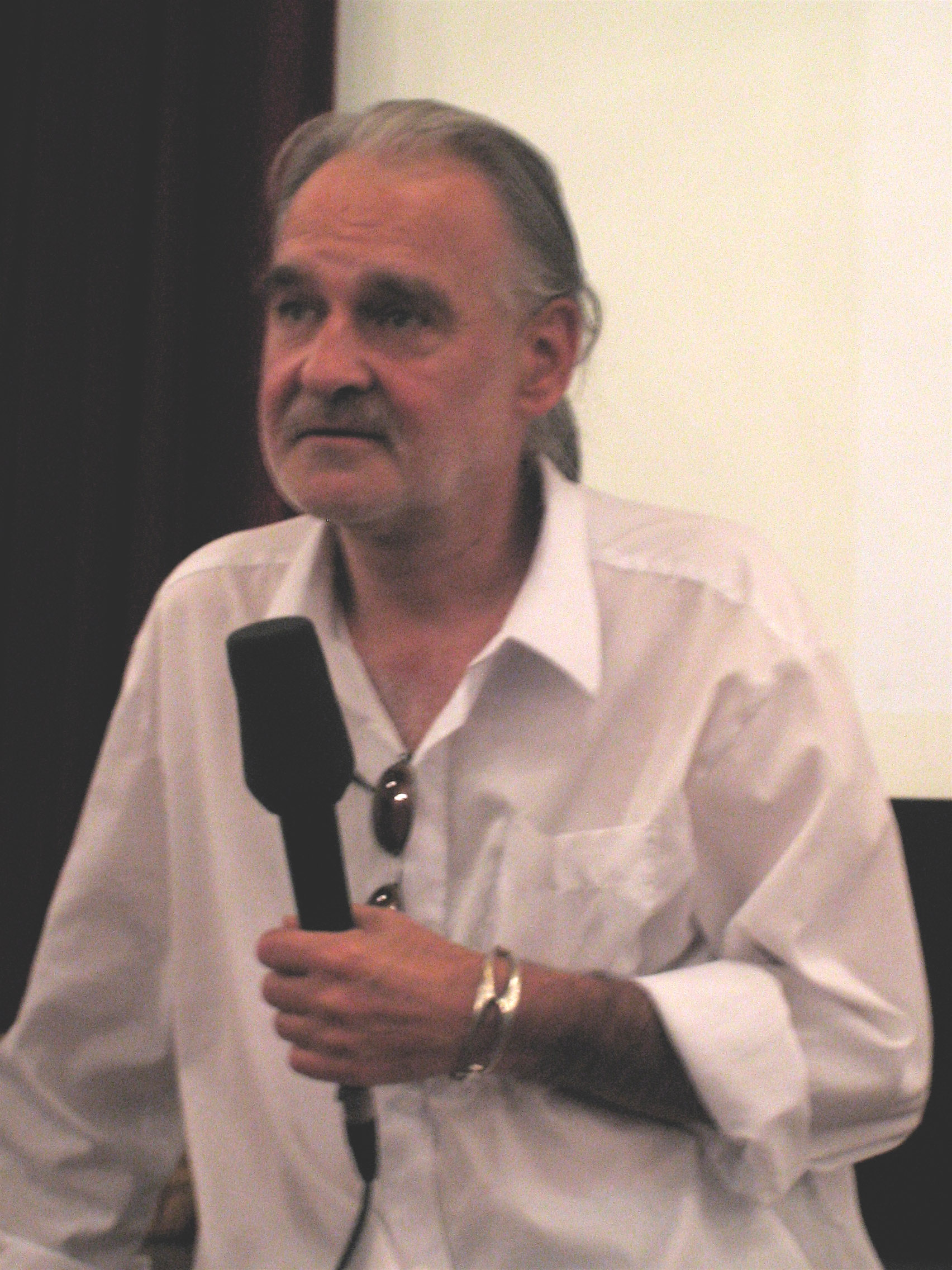
Béla Tarr at the 2007 Sarajevo Film Festival

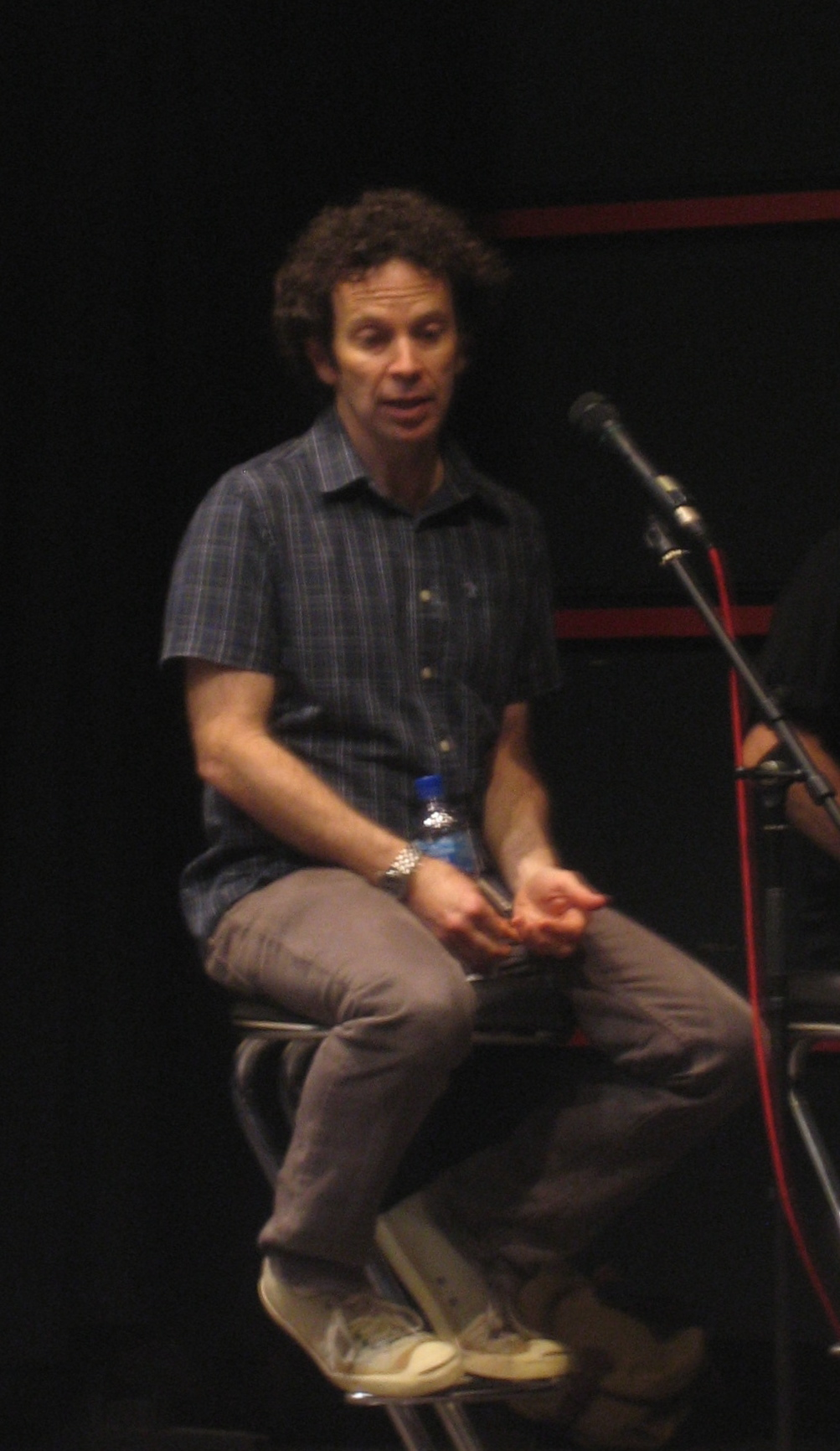
Charlie Kaufman at the 2008 Sarajevo Film Festival

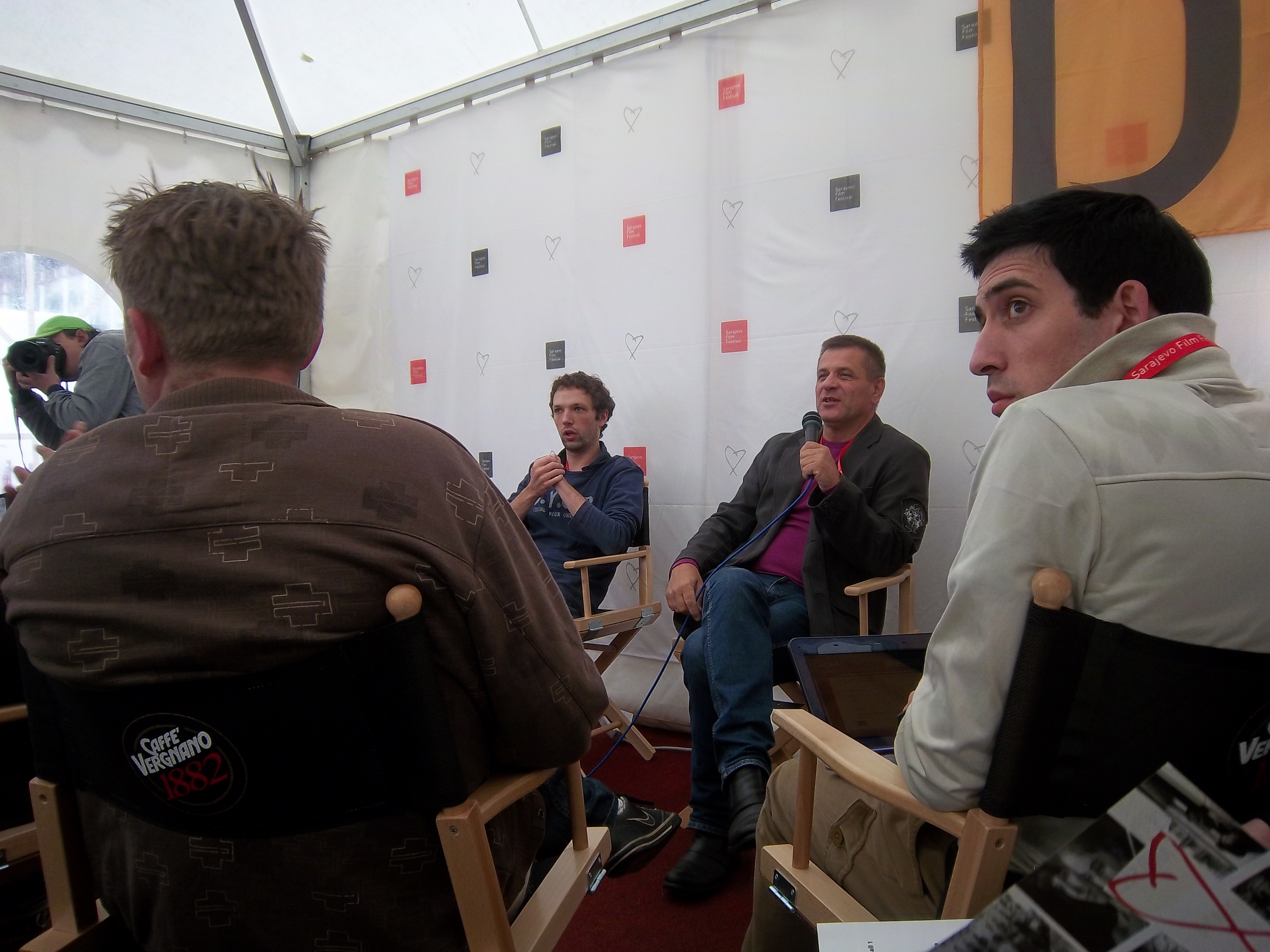
Docucorner of the 2011 Sarajevo Film Festival

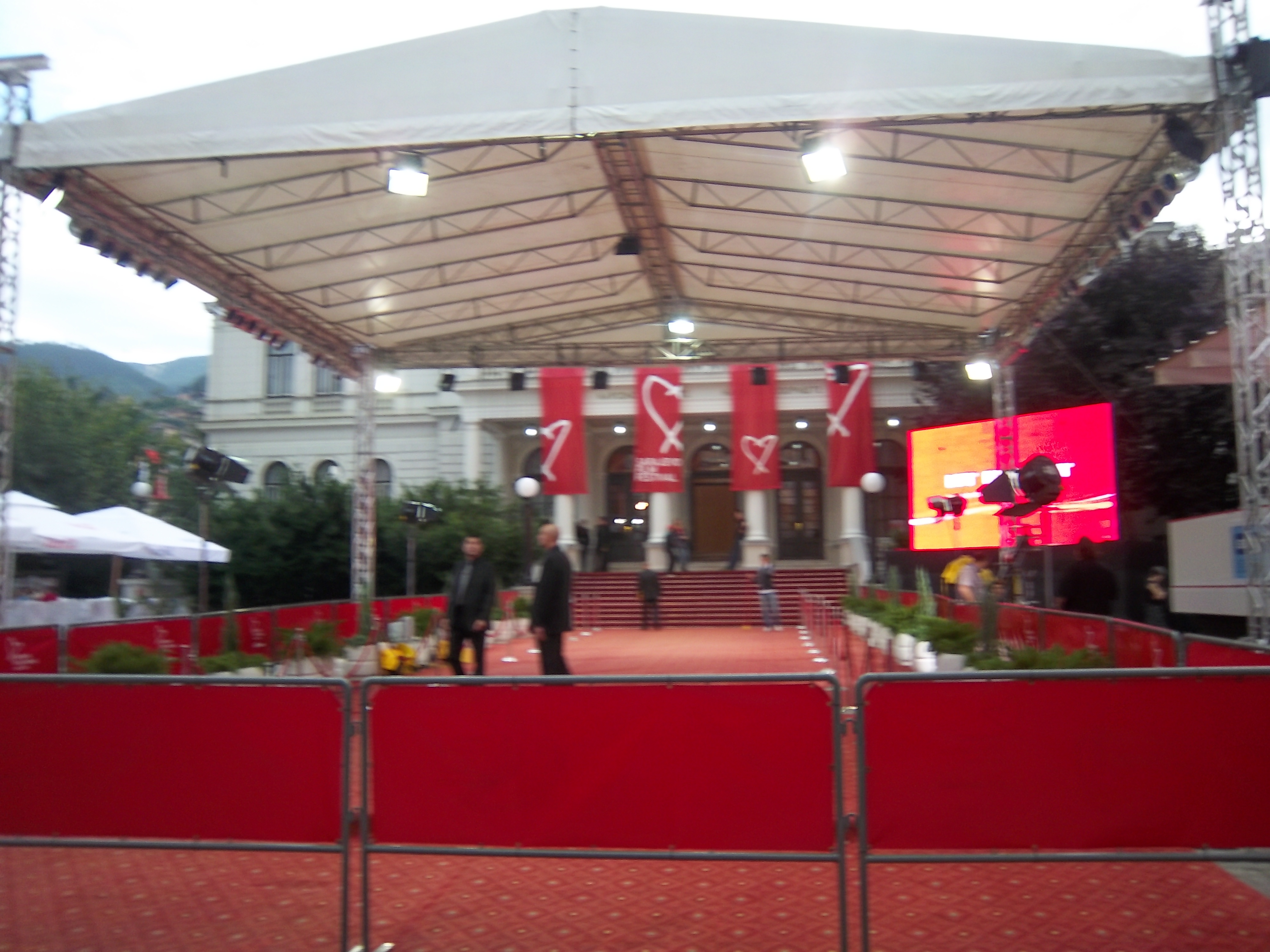
Red carpet of the 2011 Sarajevo Film Festival in front of the National Theatre

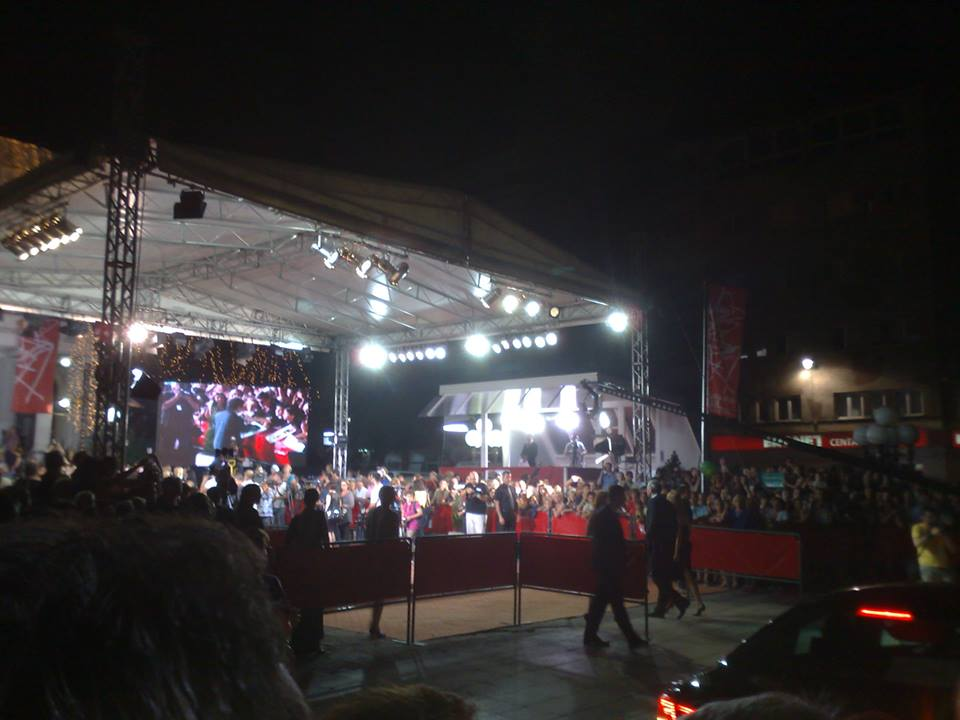
2014 Sarajevo Film Festival

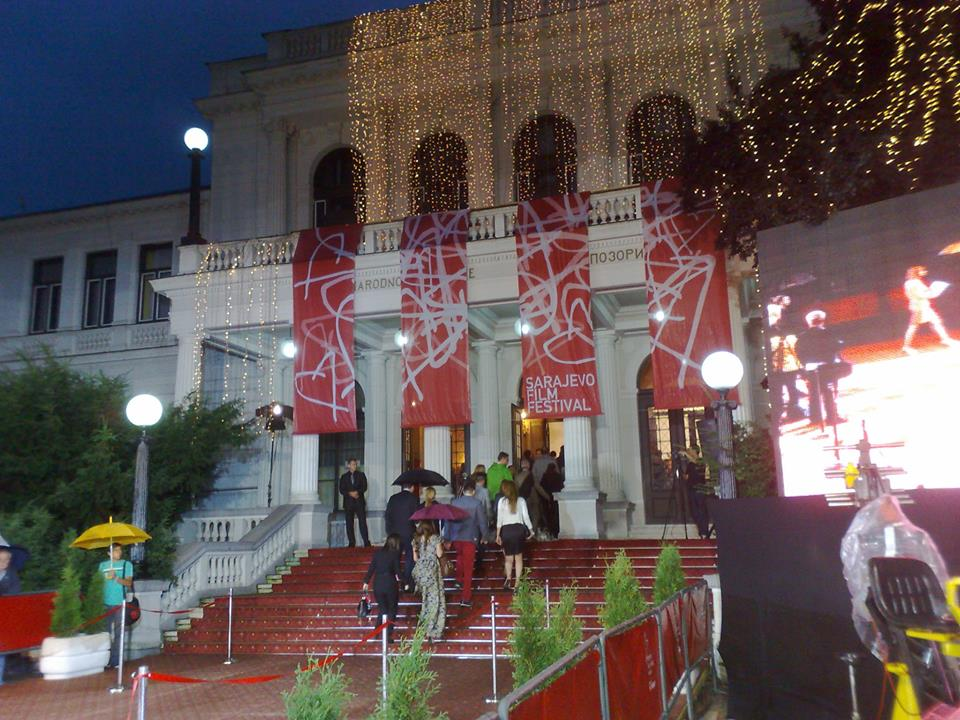
At the festival, 2014

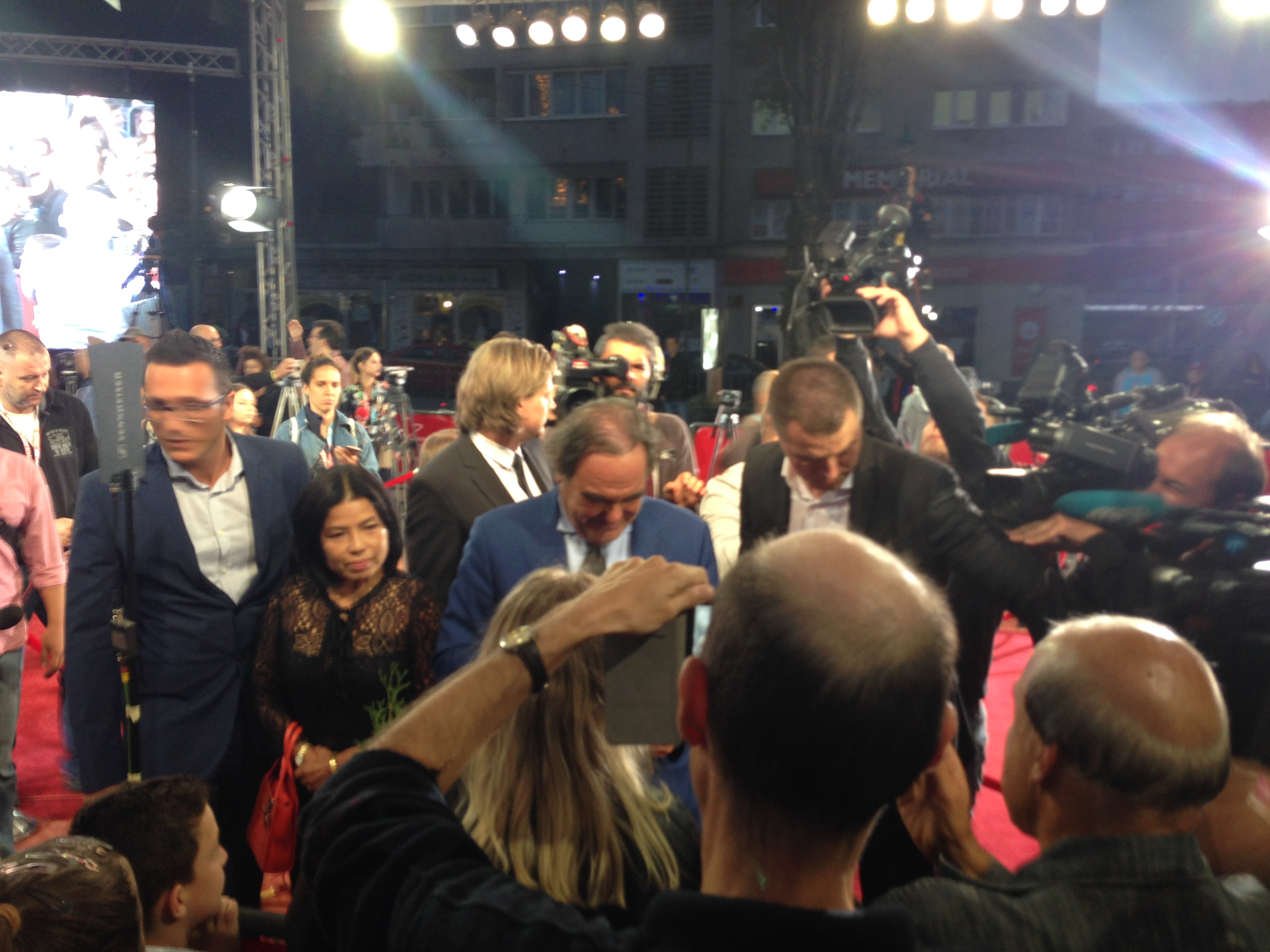
Oliver Stone at the 2017 Sarajevo Film Festival

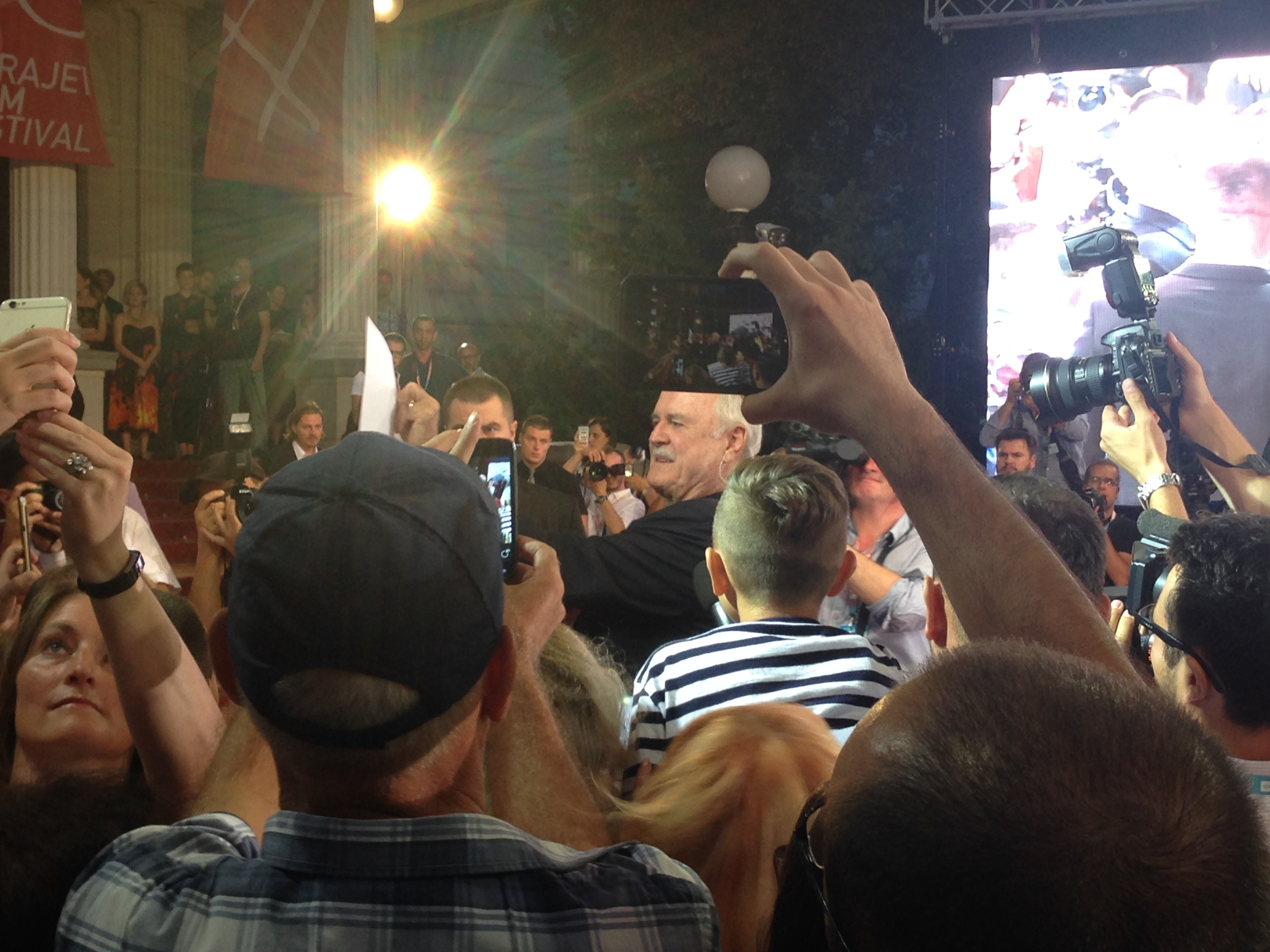
John Cleese at the 2017 Sarajevo Film Festival

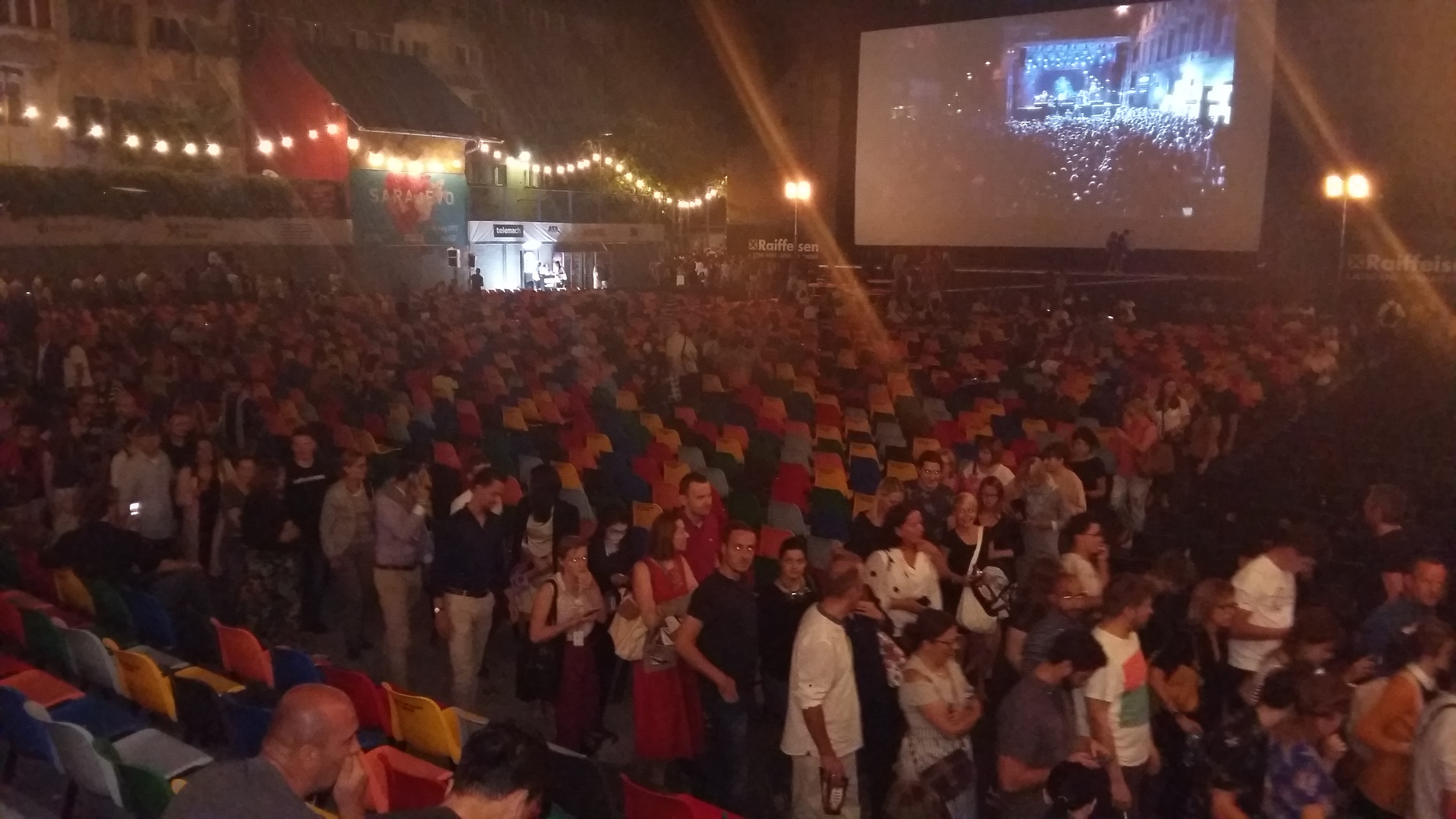
The 2017 Open Air Cinema

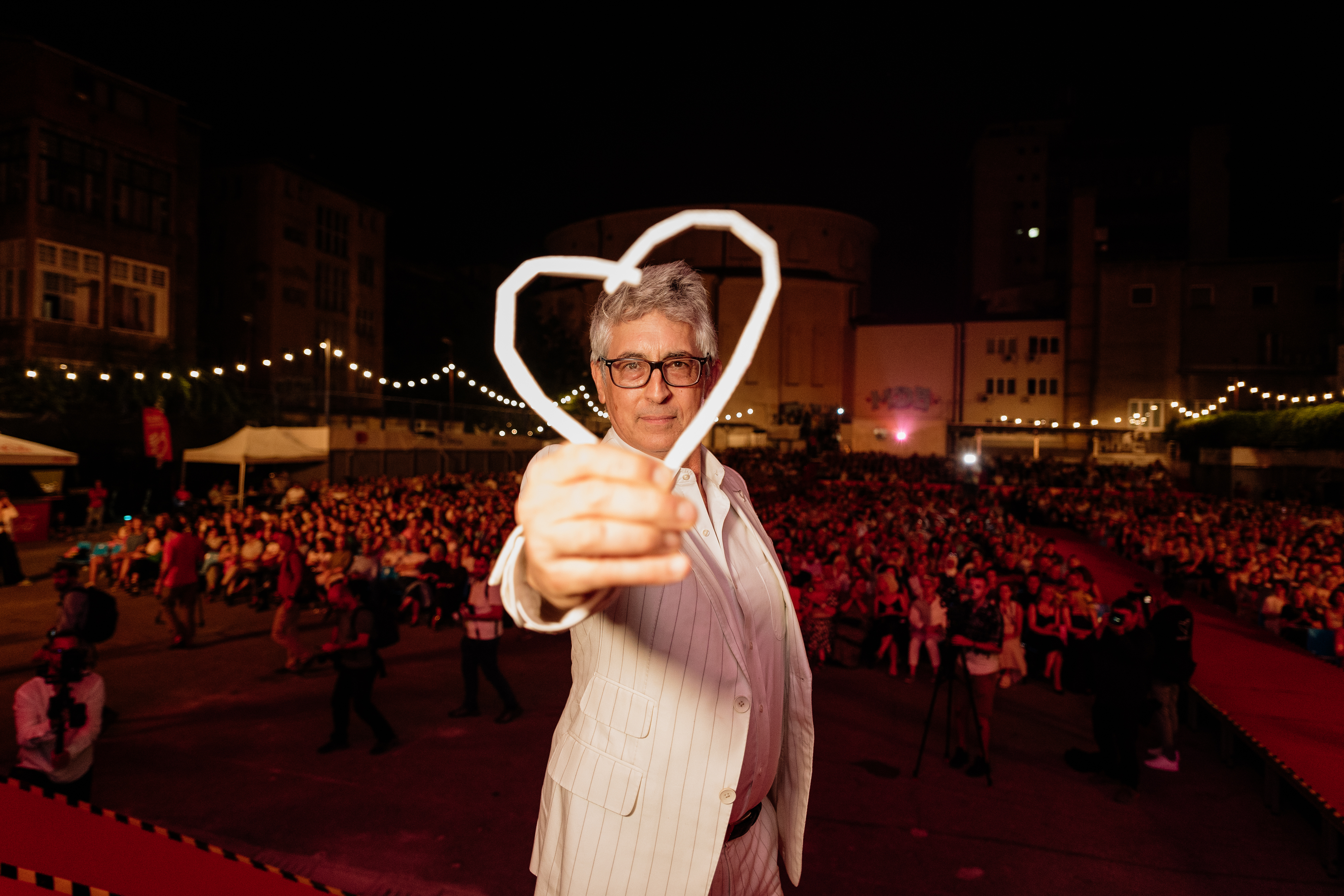
Alexander Payne at the 2024 Sarajevo Film Festival

== See also ==
- Heart of Sarajevo
- Ivica Matić Award
- Bosnian-Herzegovinian Film Festival
- MESS (festival)
- List of Bosnia and Herzegovina films
- Cinema of Europe
- List of cinema of the world
- World cinema
